= Paul A. Chase =

American judge (1895–1963)

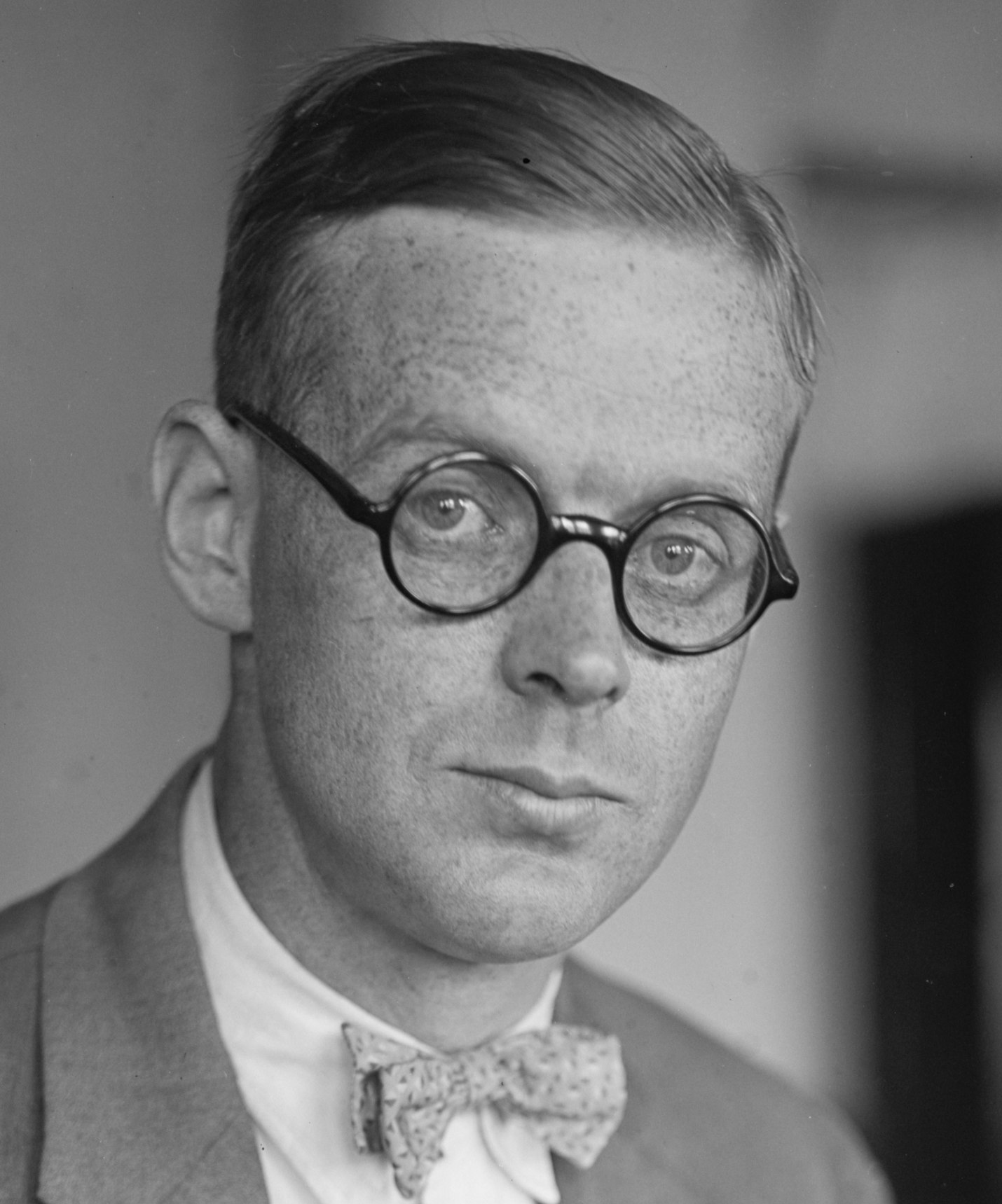
- Paul A. Chase in 1925

Associate Justice of the Vermont Supreme Court
- In office 1953–1956
- Preceded by: Stephen S. Cushing
- Succeeded by: James Stuart Holden

Chief Judge of the Vermont Superior Court
- In office March 1, 1953 – June 16, 1953
- Preceded by: Orrin B. Hughes
- Succeeded by: Benjamin N. Hulburd

Judge of the Vermont Superior Court
- In office 1948–1953
- Preceded by: Walter H. Cleary
- Succeeded by: Harold C. Sylvester

Chairman of the Vermont Public Service Commission
- In office 1947–1948
- Preceded by: Fletcher D. P. Plumley
- Succeeded by: James Stuart Holden

Member of the Vermont House of Representatives from Ludlow
- In office January 1947 – April 1947
- Preceded by: Henry D. Vail
- Succeeded by: Wallace C. Schinoski

President of the Vermont Bar Association
- In office 1945–1946
- Preceded by: Leonard F. Wing
- Succeeded by: Harold C. Sylvester

Personal details
- Born: November 13, 1895 Whitingham, Vermont
- Died: July 31, 1963 (aged 67) Townshend, Vermont
- Resting place: Morningside Cemetery, Brattleboro, Vermont
- Spouse: Doris Eleanor Dexter (m. 1926)
- Relations: Harrie B. Chase (brother)
- Children: 1
- Education: Amherst College (attended)
- Occupation: Attorney; Military officer Public official

Military service
- Allegiance: United States
- Branch/service: United States Army
- Years of service: 1918–19, 1942-1947 (Army); 1919–1923, 1934-1938, 1947-1948 (National Guard); 1938-1942 (Army Reserve)
- Rank: Colonel
- Battles/wars: World War I World War II
- Awards: Bronze Star Medal

Paul A. Chase (November 13, 1895 – July 31, 1963) was a Vermont military officer, attorney, and public official. He served as an associate justice of the Vermont Supreme Court from 1953 to 1956.

The son of a prominent attorney and brother of Harrie B. Chase, who served as a federal judge, Paul Chase was born in Whitingham, Vermont, and raised in Brattleboro. He attended Amherst College, served in the Army during World War I, and returned home to study law with his father and brother. After admission to the bar, Chase served in prominent government positions during the 1920s including state commissioner of taxes and special assistant to the United States Attorney General.

After practicing law in Vermont throughout the 1930s, and serving in the National Guard and organized Reserve, Chase returned to active duty for World War II and attained the rank of colonel as a member of the Judge Advocate General Corps. After service in the Pacific and with units in the United States, he returned to Vermont to resume practicing law. His post-war ascent was rapid and he moved quickly from member of the Vermont House of Representatives to Chairman of the Vermont Public Service Commission to Judge of the Vermont Superior Court.

In 1953, Chase was appointed an Associate Justice of the Vermont Supreme Court and he served until increasingly ill health forced him to retire in 1956. Chase died in Townshend, Vermont, and was buried in Brattleboro.

== Early life ==
Paul Addison Chase was born in Whitingham, Vermont, on November 13, 1895, the son of attorney Charles Sumner Chase and Carrie (Brigham) Chase. His siblings included Harrie B. Chase, who served on the Vermont Supreme Court and the United States Court of Appeals for the Second Circuit. Chase was raised in Brattleboro, and he graduated from Brattleboro High School in 1914. Chase attended Amherst College as a member of the class of 1918, and left during his junior year to join the United States Army for World War I.

== World War I ==
First assigned to the 151st Depot Brigade at Camp Devens, Massachusetts, after completing his initial training Chase was assigned to the 304th Infantry Regiment a subordinate command of the 76th Division. By September 1918, Chase was attending the signal school at the 1st Depot Division in France, where he was trained to lay telephone cable and install and operate field telephones and switchboards. Subsequently, assigned to the headquarters of the 148th Infantry Regiment, a unit of the 37th Division, he took part in combat during October and November, including the Battle of Saint-Mihiel, and fighting around Avocourt during the Meuse-Argonne Offensive.

Chase remained in Europe for post-war occupation duty, and was promoted to corporal in December 1918. He returned to the United States in April 1919, and was discharged at Camp Devens. After the war, he took part in organizing the American Legion in Vermont, and was the state organization's first finance officer.

Following his discharge from the Army, Chase joined the Vermont National Guard's 43rd Infantry Division. He was promoted to sergeant, and served until being discharged in 1923.

== Interwar career ==
After the war, Chase studied law with his father and brother. In January 1921, he was appointed assistant secretary of the Vermont Senate, and in March, he was elected Brattleboro's grand juror (prosecutor in the municipal court). Chase was admitted to the bar in 1922, and practiced as a member of his father's firm.

In February 1925, Chase was appointed as Vermont's Commissioner of Taxes. He served until July 1925, when he resigned in order to accept appointment as special assistant to John G. Sargent during Sargent's term as United States Attorney General. After Sargent left office at the end of Calvin Coolidge's presidency in 1929, Chase remained on the staff of Sargent's successor William D. Mitchell in order to facilitate the transition between Sargent and Mitchell.

In July 1930, Chase joined the Ludlow law firm of Sargent and William W. Stickney. He also joined the board of directors of the Ludlow Savings Bank and Trust Company, and later served as the bank's president. In 1934, Chase returned to the National Guard and was commissioned as a captain of Infantry. In 1938, he transferred his military membership to the Organized Reserve Corps, and he was commissioned as a captain in the Judge Advocate General Corps.

== World War II ==
During World War II, Chase was activated as a member of the 43rd Infantry Division staff, and took part in the unit's training at Camp Blanding, Florida, Camp Shelby, Mississippi, and in New Zealand. Assigned as the division's judge advocate, he was promoted to lieutenant colonel, and he served in the occupation of New Caledonia. When the 43rd Division moved on to occupy Guadalcanal and the Russell Islands, Chase was assigned to serve as judge advocate for all forces on New Caledonia, and he was promoted to colonel in June 1943.

In April 1944, Chase was assigned as judge advocate for the Boston-based 1st Service Command, the Army Service Forces unit that oversaw wartime personnel and logistics management for the New England Region. In May 1945, Chase was appointed to a two-year term as professor of military science and tactics at Norwich University. In May 1947, Chase was appointed to the military staff of Governor Ernest W. Gibson Jr. with the rank of colonel, and he served until becoming a judge in 1948.

== Post-war political and judicial service ==
In 1945, Chase was elected president of the Vermont Bar Association, and he completed the one-year term left vacant by the death of Leonard F. Wing. In January 1946 he was elected to the board of trustees of the Vermont Soldiers Home. In November 1946 Chase was the successful Republican nominee to represent Ludlow in the Vermont House of Representatives.

Chase was serving in the legislature in April 1947 and was chairman of the House Judiciary Committee when he was appointed to the Vermont Public Service Commission. He was selected to serve as the commission's chairman, and held the post until September 1948, when he was appointed a judge on the Vermont Superior Court. He advanced through seniority to become the chief judge in March 1953, and served on the court until June 1953.

In June 1953, Associate Justice Stephen S. Cushing resigned from the Vermont Supreme Court. Chase was appointed to the vacancy, in keeping with Vermont's tradition of promoting the chief judge of the Superior Court. In June 1956, news accounts indicated that Case and his wife were in ill health, and had gone to California to recuperate. Chase had not informed the governor or the chief justice of his location or the reasons for his absence, and the court's caseload backed up because Chase did not complete or submit the opinions assigned to him to author. As a result of Chase's absence, Chief Justice Olin M. Jeffords requested his resignation. Chase was initially resistant, and said he intended to return to work and seek appointment to a new two-year term in 1957. He later changed his mind, and he submitted his resignation in August 1956. He was succeeded on the court by James Stuart Holden.

== Awards ==
In November 1945, Chase's World War II service was recognized with award of the Bronze Star Medal, which was presented by Leonard Wing. In 1953, Chase received the honorary degree of Master of Arts from Amherst College.

== Retirement and death ==
In retirement, Chase was a resident of Newfane. He died at the hospital in Townshend on July 31, 1963, and was buried at Morningside Cemetery in Brattleboro.

== Family ==
In 1926, Chase married Doris Eleanor Dexter of Philadelphia. They were the parents of a son, Charles Dexter Chase (1927–1999).

== Sources ==
=== Newspapers ===
- "From the Boys in the Service: Recent Letters Descriptive of the Life of the Boys in Army and Navy". Brattleboro Daily Reformer. Brattleboro, VT. October 10, 1918 – via Newspapers.com.
- "From the Boys in the Service: Recent Letters Descriptive of the Life of the Boys in Army and Navy". Brattleboro Daily Reformer. Brattleboro, VT. October 25, 1918 – via Newspapers.com.
- "Corporal Chase Receives Discharge". Brattleboro Daily Reformer. Brattleboro, VT. April 11, 1919 – via Newspapers.com.
- "American Legion Post Organizes". Brattleboro Daily Reformer. Brattleboro, VT. September 5, 1919 – via Newspapers.com.
- "Governors' Messages: Retiring and Incoming Executives Address Legislature". Randolph Herald and News. Randolph, VT. January 13, 1921 – via Newspapers.com.
- "Result of the Vote for Town Officers". Brattleboro Daily Reformer. Brattleboro, VT. March 1, 1921 – via Newspapers.com.
- "Paul A. Chase Passes Bar Exams". Brattleboro Daily Reformer. Brattleboro, VT. October 6, 1922 – via Newspapers.com.
- "Paul A. Chase of Brattleboro to Succeed Col. F. B. Thomas as Tax Commissioner". Burlington Free Press. Burlington, VT. Vermont Press Bureau. January 13, 1925 – via Newspapers.com.
- "Photo Caption: Paul A. Chase of Brattleboro..." The News-Messenger. Fremont, OH. July 31, 1925 – via Newspapers.com.
- "Miss Dexter is Bride of Paul Addison Chase". Philadelphia Inquirer. Philadelphia, PA. November 28, 1926 – via Newspapers.com.
- "Chase Leaves Office of Attorney General to Join Sargent Firm". Hartford Courant. Hartford, VT. Associated Press. July 2, 1930 – via Newspapers.com.
- "New Military Science Head at Norwich: Col. Chase had 16 Months in South Pacific". Burlington Free Press. Burlington, VT. May 5, 1945 – via Newspapers.com.
- "Maj.-Gen. Leonard Wing Elected President of Vermont Bar Ass'n". Burlington Free Press. Burlington, VT. October 4, 1945 – via Newspapers.com.
- "Col. Paul A. Chase Appointed Trustee of Vt. Soldiers Home". Burlington Free Press. Burlington, VT. Morning Press Bureau. January 4, 1946 – via Newspapers.com.
- "Col. Paul A. Chase Commended by Army". Burlington Free Press. Burlington, VT. Morning Press Bureau. April 22, 1946 – via Newspapers.com.
- "Representatives Elected". Burlington Free Press. Burlington, VT. November 8, 1946 – via Newspapers.com.
- "Twelve State Board Chairmen Are Appointed". Burlington Free Press. Burlington, VT. May 6, 1947 – via Newspapers.com.
- "Sylvester Named Superior Judge; Cushing Resigns; Chase Elevated". Burlington Free Press. Burlington, VT. Morning Press Bureau. June 16, 1953 – via Newspapers.com.
- "Long Absent Justice Chase in California". Burlington Free Press. Burlington, VT. June 13, 1956 – via Newspapers.com.
- "Colleagues Request Chase's Resignation". Burlington Free Press. Burlington, VT. Morning Press Bureau. July 27, 1956 – via Newspapers.com.
- "Judge Holden's Elevation to High Bench Points Up Rapid Turnover on Vt. Court". Burlington Free Press. Burlington, VT. Morning Press Bureau. August 4, 1956 – via Newspapers.com.
- "Former Jurist Paul Chase Dies". Burlington Free Press. Burlington, VT. Associated Press. August 1, 1963 – via Newspapers.com.
- "Death Notice, Paul Addison Chase". Philadelphia Inquirer. Philadelphia, PA. August 2, 1963 – via Newspapers.com.

=== Internet ===
- Ballou, H. B. (Whitingham, VT Town Clerk) (November 13, 1895). "Vermont Vital Records, 1720-1908, Birth Entry for Paul Addison Chase". Ancestry.com. Provo, UT: Ancestry.com, LLC.
- Phillips, R. W. (Townshend, VT Town Clerk) (September 1, 1963). "Vermont Death Records, 1909-2008, Entry for Paul Addison Chase". Ancestry.com. Provo, UT: Ancestry.com, LLC.
- State of North Carolina (March 24, 1999). "Charles Dexter Chase in the North Carolina, Death Indexes, 1908-2004". Ancestry.com. Provo, UT: Ancestry.com, LLC.

=== Books ===
- Amherst College Board of Trustees (1953). Amherst College Bulletin: Annual Catalog, 1953-1954. Amherst, MA: Amherst College.
- Johnson, Herbert T. (Adjutant General of Vermont) (1927). Roster of Vermont Men and Women in the World War. Rutland, Vermont: Tuttle Company – via Ancestry.com.
- Vermont Bar Association (1963). Report of Proceedings of the Annual Meeting. Vol. 57. Montpelier, VT: Argus and Patriot Steam Book Press.
- National Guard Bureau (1943). Official National Guard Register. Washington, DC: U.S. Government Printing Office – via Ancestry.com.

=== Magazines ===
- "Col. Chase Decorated As Norwich Cadets Honor Gen. Wing". Norwich University Record. Northfield, VT: Norwich University. December 7, 1945.

Political offices
| Preceded by Stephen S. Cushing | Justice of the Vermont Supreme Court; 1953–1956 | Succeeded by James Stuart Holden |
