= Milford K. Smith =

American judge (1906–1984)

Milford K. Smith (February 25, 1906 – November 15, 1984) was a Vermont attorney, politician, and judge. He is most notable for his service as an associate justice of the Vermont Supreme Court from 1959 to 1976.

== Early life ==
Milford Knowles Smith was born in Albany, New York on February 25, 1906, the son of Dr. Ray E. Smith and Ethel (Burgess) Smith. He was raised and educated in Rutland, Vermont, and graduated from Rutland High School in 1924. He then attended the Tilton School in Tilton, New Hampshire and the University of Vermont before enrolling at Albany Law School, from which he received his LL.B. degree in 1930. Smith was a member of the Phi Delta Theta and Phi Alpha Delta fraternities.

== Start of career ==
Smith was admitted to the bar soon after his law school graduation, and began a practice in Rutland. A Republican, he became involved in politics and government as Rutland's city attorney, a post he held from 1930 to 1932 and 1940 to 1948. He was the judge of Rutland's municipal court from 1936 to 1937, and again from 1942 to 1944. He was elected to the Vermont Senate in 1950, and reelected in 1952. He served from 1951 until resigning in 1953 to accept an appointment as a judge.

== Judicial career ==
In 1953, the Vermont General Assembly elected Smith to fill a vacancy on the Vermont Superior Court. He served until 1959, and rose by seniority to become next in line for appointment as the court's chief judge.

In 1959, Chief Justice Walter H. Cleary and Associate Justice Charles Bayley Adams reached age 70, the mandatory retirement for judges in Vermont, and Associate Justice Benjamin N. Hulburd was promoted to chief justice. The state's longstanding tradition was to promote the chief judge of the superior court to the supreme court as vacancies arose. Because two supreme court vacancies occurred simultaneously in 1959, the legislature promoted Albert W. Barney Jr., the superior court's chief judge, and Smith, who was the next-senior superior court judge.

Smith served as an associate justice until retiring in 1976. He was succeeded by William C. Hill, who was serving as chief judge of the superior court.

== Other activities ==
A noted outdoors enthusiast, in addition to serving as president of the Vermont Fish and Game Club he was the longtime author of "Stray Shots and Short Casts", a column on hunting and fishing which was carried in the Rutland Herald. Smith also authored articles which were carried in Field & Stream, Vermont Life, and Trout Unlimited's Trout magazine. In addition, he served as a trustee of the American Museum of Fly Fishing.

Smith was also president of the Rutland Free Library Association and a trustee of the Rutland Historical Society.

== Retirement and death ==
In retirement, Smith continued to reside in Rutland. He was diagnosed with liver cancer in 1984, and died at his home in Rutland on November 15, 1984. He was buried at Evergreen Cemetery in Rutland.

== Honors and legacy ==
In 1967, Smith, James Stuart Holden, and Percival L. Shangraw were awarded Albany Law School's Trustees Gold Medal for distinguished public service. All three were ALS graduates, and at the time, Holden was chief justice of the Vermont Supreme Court and Smith and Shangraw were associate justices.

Smith accumulated over 600 precolonial Native American artifacts, and authored articles and presented lectures on the history of American Indians in Vermont. After his death, the Vermont Archaeology Heritage Center, an office of the state Agency of Commerce and Community Development, acquired these items. The Center now maintains them as the Judge Milford Smith Collection.

== Family ==
In 1942, Smith married Joyce M. Plunkett of Rutland; she was a graduate of Colby Junior College and the Traphagen School of Fashion in New York City. They were the parents of son Milford Knowles Smith Jr. and daughter Jane Atkinson Smith.

== Sources ==
=== Newspapers ===
- "Miss Joyce Plunkett Becomes the Bride of Milford K. Smith". Burlington Free Press. Burlington, VT. October 16, 1942 – via Newspapers.com.
- "15 State Senators Re-elected". Burlington Free Press. Burlington, VT. November 9, 1950 – via Newspapers.com.
- "Senators Elected". Burlington Free Press. Burlington, VT. November 5, 1952 – via Newspapers.com.
- "Smith is Elected as Superior Judge". Burlington Free Press. Burlington, VT. February 20, 1953 – via Newspapers.com.
- "40 Pct. Turnover Due on Vermont Supreme Court". Burlington Free Press. Burlington, VT. Morning Press Bureau. January 27, 1959 – via Newspapers.com.
- "Vt. Supreme Court Justices to be Honored in Albany". Bennington Banner. Bennington, VT. May 25, 1967 – via Newspapers.com.
- Donoghue, Mike (November 9, 1976). "High Court Nominees Sworn In". Burlington Free Press. Burlington, VT – via Newspapers.com.
- Melvin, Don (November 17, 1984). "Veteran Judge M. K. Smith Dies". Burlington Free Press. Burlington, VT – via Newspapers.com.
- "Obituary, Judge Milford K. Smith Sr". Burlington Free Press. Burlington, VT. November 17, 1984 – via Newspapers.com.

=== Magazines ===
- Partridge, Sanborn (Summer 1979). "Chronology, Rutland Historical Society". Rutland Historical Society Quarterly. Rutland, VT: Rutland Historical Society.

=== Internet ===
- "Vermont Archaeology Month" (PDF). historicsites.vermont.gov/. Montpelier, VT: State of Vermont. August 15, 2017.

=== Books ===
- The Red and White (1924) (PDF). Rutland, VT: Rutland High School. 1924.
- The Red and White (1927) (PDF). Rutland, VT: Rutland High School. 1927.

Political offices
| Preceded by Charles Bayley Adams | Justice of the Vermont Supreme Court; 1959–1976 | Succeeded by William C. Hill |
