= List of Albany Law School alumni =

This is a partial list of those who attended Albany Law School. Alumni are categorized by each alumnus or alumna's most distinguishing accomplishments.

== Academics ==
- Alicia Ouellette, professor at Albany Law School
- Russell Conwell, founder and first president of Temple University
- James A. MacAlister, former president of Drexel University
- Patricia Salkin, Dean and Professor of Law, Touro College Jacob D. Fuchsberg Law Center

== Judges ==
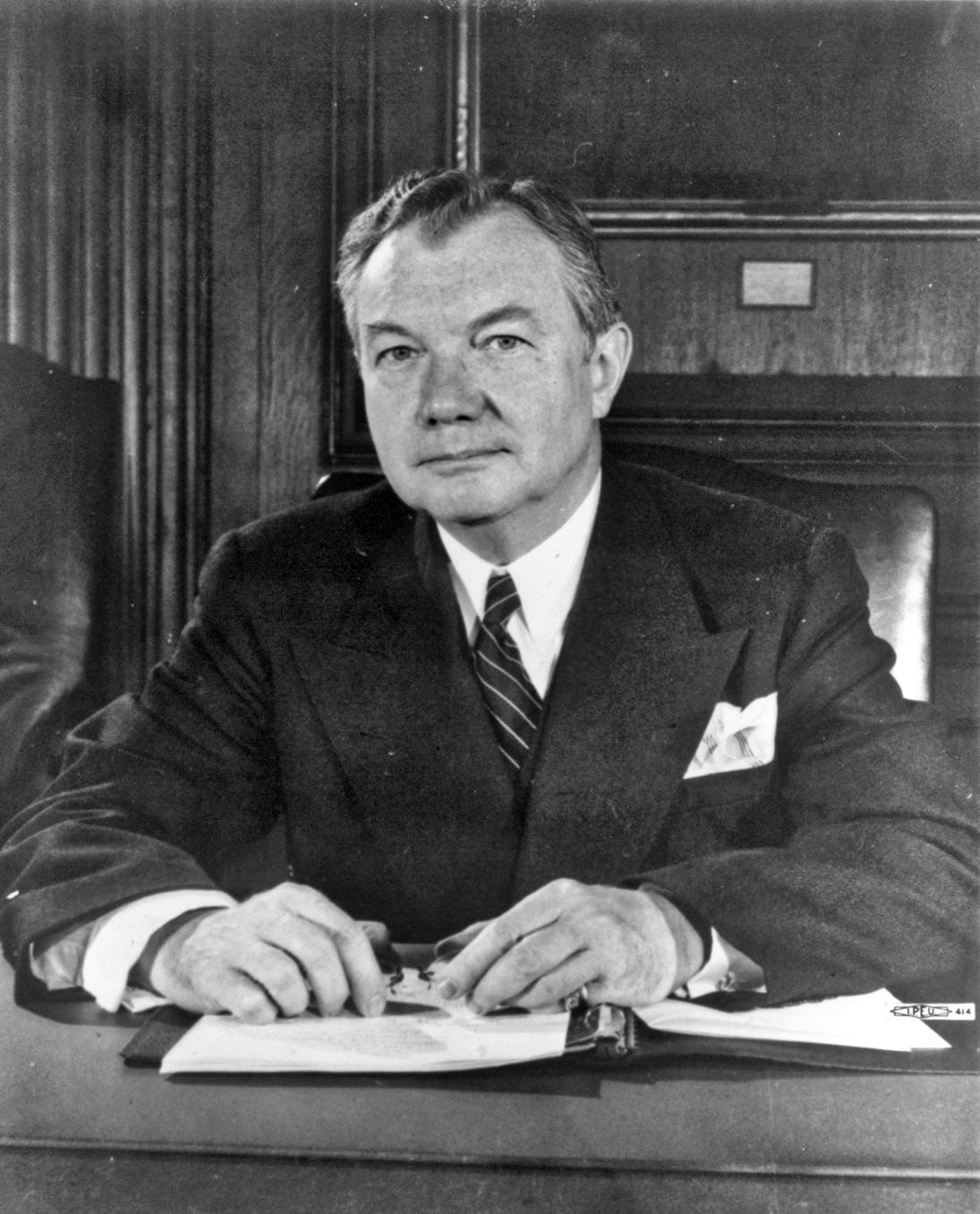
Justice Robert H. Jackson

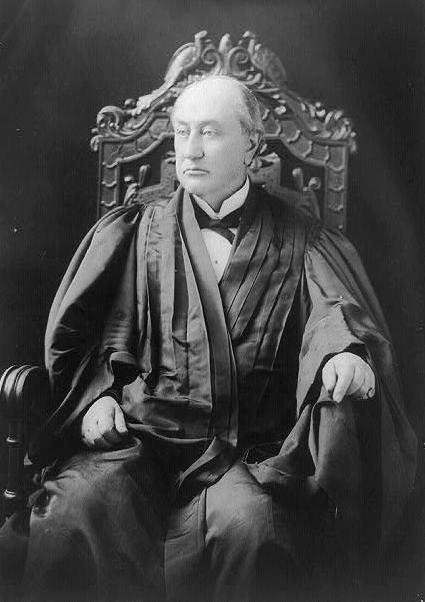
Justice David Josiah Brewer

- Orion M. Barber, Judge of the United States Court of Customs and Patent Appeals
- Francis Bergan, former associate Judge, New York State Court of Appeals
- David Josiah Brewer, former Associate Justice of the U.S. Supreme Court
- Anthony Brindisi, United States Representative and federal judge
- John B. Cassoday, former Chief Justice of the Wisconsin Supreme Court
- Amaro Cavalcanti, former justice of the Supreme Court of Brazil, former Justice of the International Court of Justice at the Hague, former mayor of Rio de Janeiro, author of Brazilian Constitution of 1891
- Lawrence H. Cooke, former Chief Judge of New York State
- Richard J. Daronco, former United States Judge for the Southern District of New York
- Richard K. Eaton, Judge, U.S. Court of International Trade
- Michael J. Garcia, associate Judge, New York Court of Appeals, former U.S. Attorney, Southern District of New York
- Domenick L. Gabrielli, associate Judge, New York Court of Appeals
- James Gibson, former associate Judge, New York State Court of Appeals
- Victoria A. Graffeo, former associate Judge, New York State Court of Appeals
- Warner A. Graham, Associate Justice of the Vermont Supreme Court
- James Stuart Holden, Judge of the United States District Court for the District of Vermont
- Robert H. Jackson, former U.S. Attorney General, Associate Justice of the U.S. Supreme Court and chief United States prosecutor at the Nuremberg Trials.
- John Franklin Kinney, County Court Judge, founding member of the Knights of Columbus and City of Rochester Bar Association.
- Moses A. Luce, Judge of the County Court of San Diego, Medal of Honor recipient
- James Loren Martin, Judge of the United States District Court for the District of Vermont
- Thomas James McAvoy, Senior United States Judge for the Northern District of New York
- David Myers, Justice of the Indiana Supreme Court
- Alton B. Parker, former Chief Judge of New York State; Candidate for President of the United States
- Percival L. Shangraw, Associate Justice of the Vermont Supreme Court (1958-1972), Chief Justice (1972-1974)
- Charles J. Siragusa, Judge in the U.S. District Court for the Western District of New York
- Milford K. Smith, Associate Justice of the Vermont Supreme Court
- Leslie Stein, associate Judge, New York Court of Appeals
- W. D. Storey, judge and district attorney in Santa Cruz County, California
- Owen P. Thompson, former judge of the Seventh Judicial District of Illinois
- Bartlett Tripp, former Chief Justice of the Dakota Territory, former United States Ambassador to Austria
- Irving G. Vann, former associate Judge, New York State Court of Appeals
- Wheelock G. Veazey, Vermont Supreme Court Justice, Interstate Commerce Commission member, Medal of Honor recipient

== Politicians ==
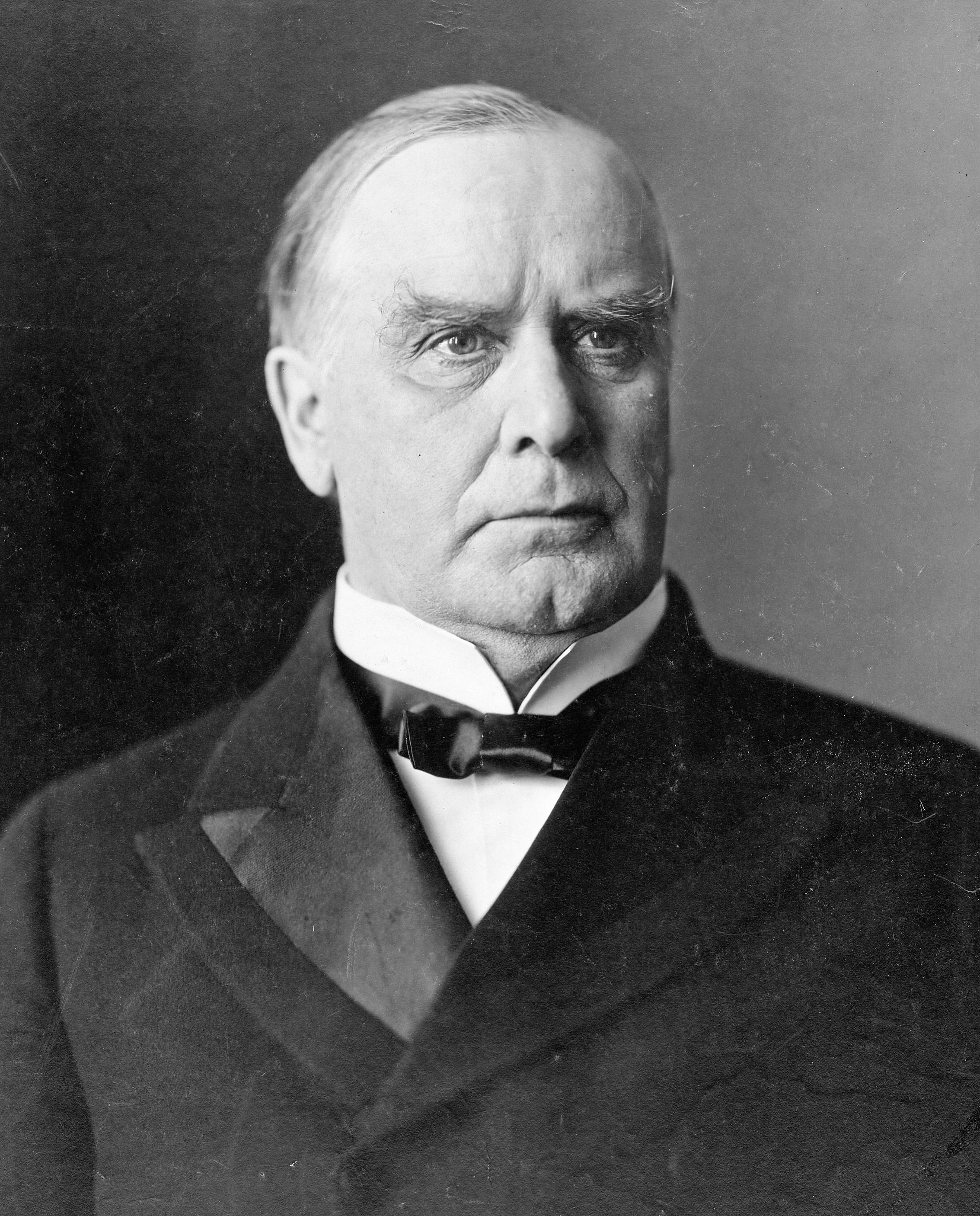
William McKinley, 25th President of the United States.

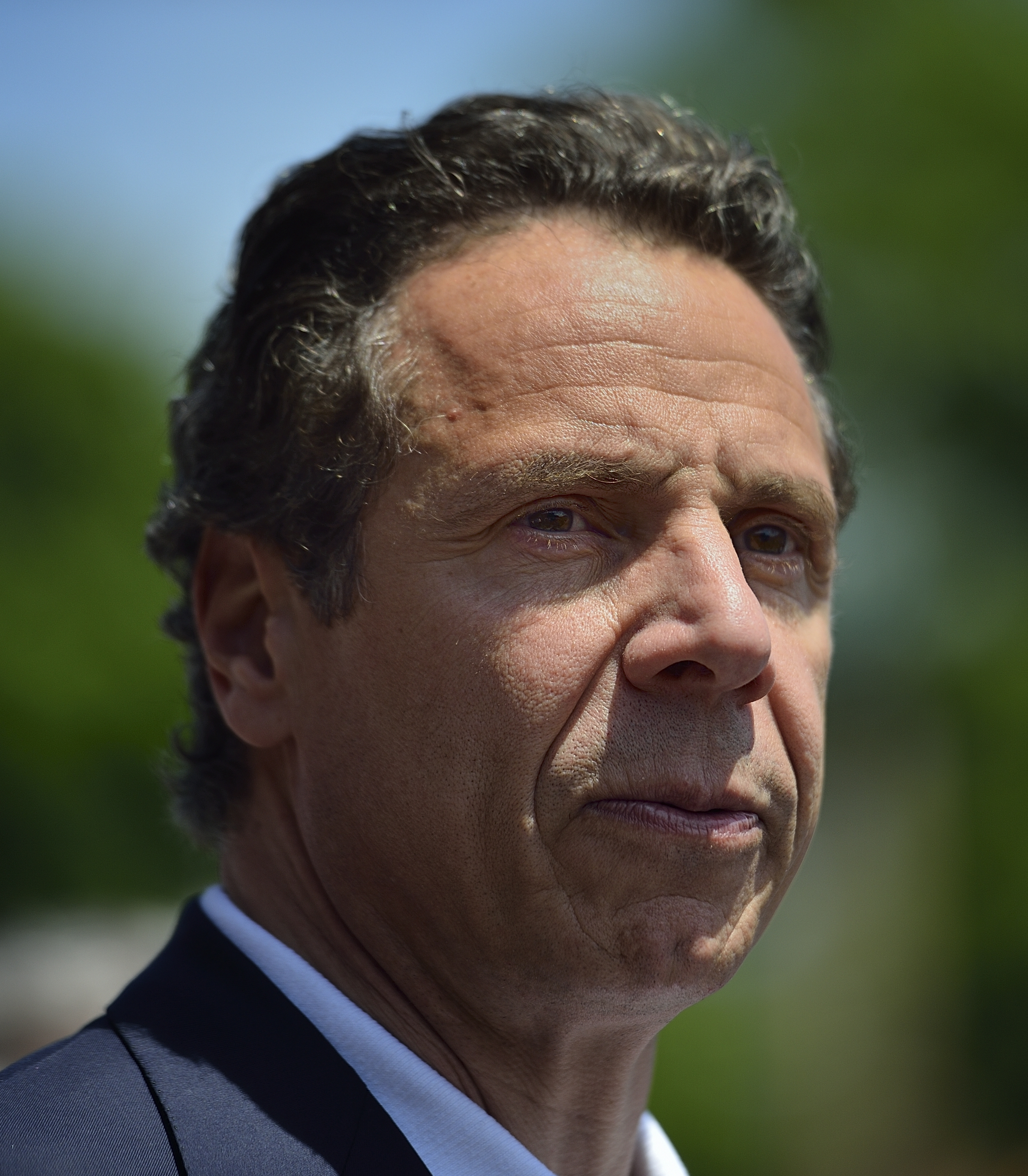
Andrew Cuomo, Governor of the State of New York.

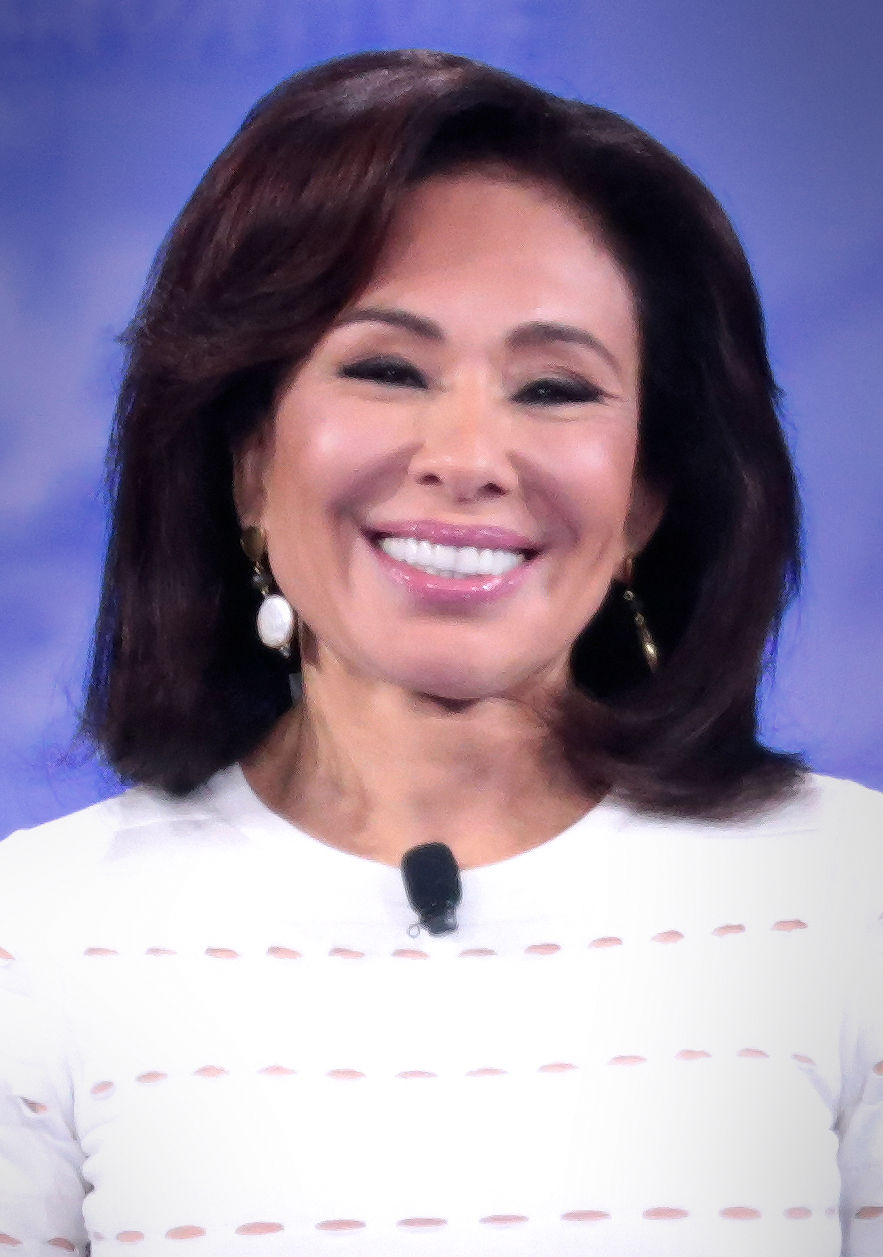
Jeanine Pirro

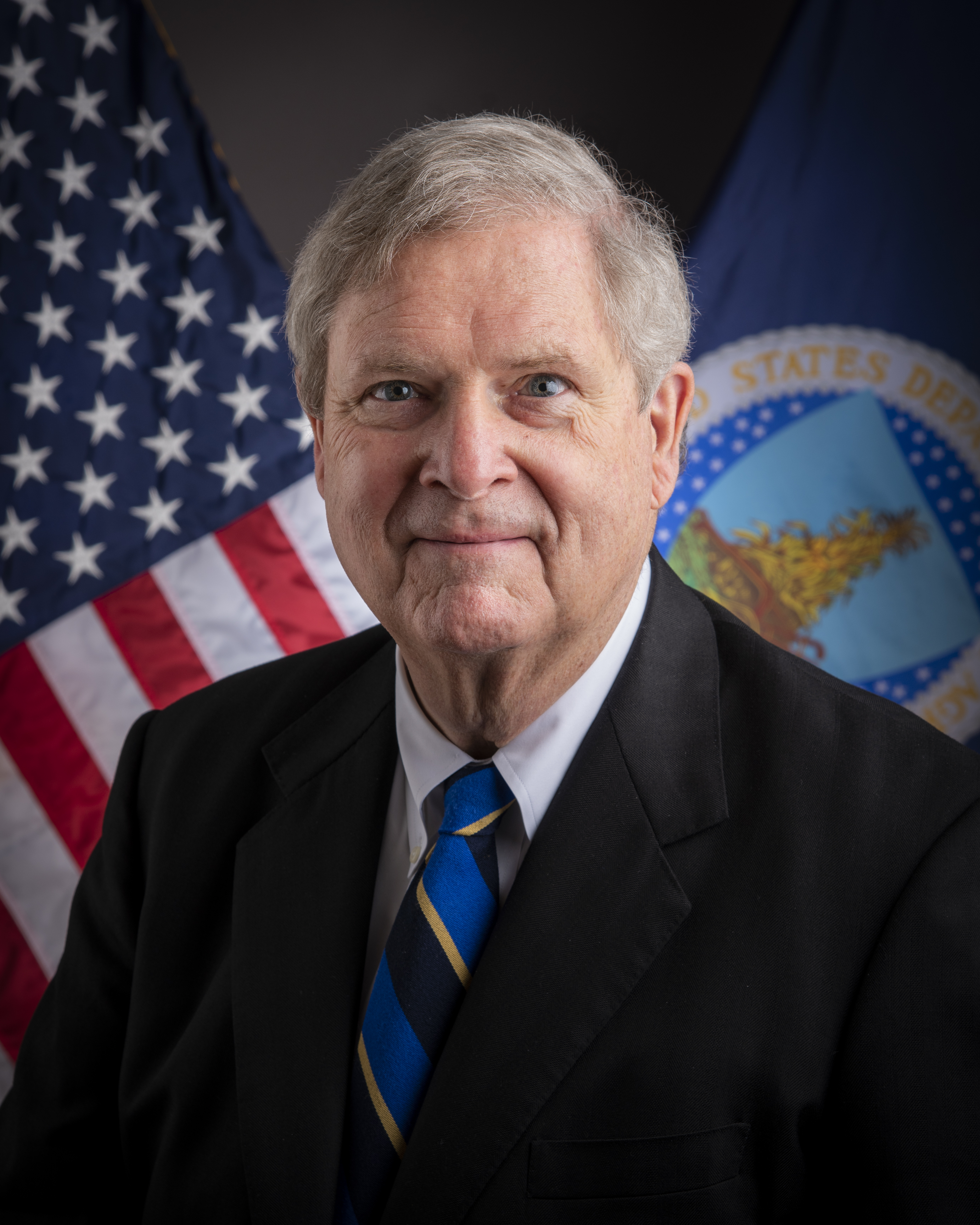
Governor Tom Vilsack in 2021.

- Warren M. Anderson, New York State Senate Majority Leader
- John Mosher Bailey, former U.S. Congressman
- Brian Barnwell, New York State Assembly
- James K. Batchelder, Speaker of the Vermont House of Representatives
- William Beidelman, former Mayor of Easton, Pennsylvania
- Stephen S. Blake, former New York State Assemblyman
- Alexander Campbell Botkin, Lieutenant Governor of Montana
- M. William Bray, Lieutenant Governor of New York
- Chauncey W. Brownell, President pro tempore of the Vermont State Senate, Secretary of State of Vermont
- William T. Byrne, former U.S. Congressman
- Kevin Cahill, New York State Assemblyman
- Joseph L. Carrigg, former U.S. Congressman
- W. Sterling Cole, former U.S. Congressman
- Edwin H. Conger, former U.S. Congressman and former Ambassador to Mexico
- Andrew Cuomo, former New York State Attorney General, former Governor of New York State.
- Jeremy Cooney, New York State Senator
- James H. Davidson, U.S. Representative from Wisconsin (1897–1913, 1917–1918).
- Nathan F. Dixon III, U.S. senator from Rhode Island
- Mary Donohue, former Lieutenant Governor of New York State
- Ralph A. Foote, Lieutenant Governor of Vermont
- Washington Gardner, former U.S Congressman and former Secretary of State of Michigan
- Henry R. Gibson, former U.S. Congressman
- Martin H. Glynn, former governor of the State of New York
- Roger W. Hulburd, Lieutenant Governor of Vermont
- Charles Kellogg, former New York state senator
- Carleton J. King, former U.S. Congressman
- Abraham Lansing, New York State Treasurer; State Senate. Delegate to International Conference for Codification of the Law of Nations
- Mike LiPetri, former New York State Assemblyman
- William Paine Lord, 9th Governor of Oregon
- David O'Brien Martin, former U.S. Congressman
- Joseph Homan Manley, leader of the Republican National Committee and Speaker of the Maine House of Representatives
- Robert C. McEwen, former U.S. Congressman
- William McKinley, 25th President of the United States
- William E. Miller, former U.S. Congressman, candidate for Vice President of the United States, and Chairman of the Republican National Committee
- John Morgan, former Wisconsin State Assemblyman
- Dalwin J. Niles, former Judge of the Fulton County Family Court and member of the New York State Senate
- Howard C. Nolan Jr., former member of the New York State Senate
- Edwin Sylvanus Osborne, former U.S. Congressman and Major General of the National Guard
- Amasa J. Parker Jr., former New York Assemblyman and Senator
- Frederick Walker Pitkin, 2nd Governor of Colorado
- Jeanine Pirro, former Westchester County District Attorney, television host, author, and former New York State judge and politician
- Harris M. Plaisted, former governor of Maine
- Redfield Proctor, former Governor of Vermont, Secretary of War, United States Senator
- John Raines, former U.S. Congressman, New York State Assemblyman, New York State Senator, and Acting Lieutenant Governor of New York
- Frederick M. Reed, Vermont Attorney General
- Joshua S. Salmon, represented the 4th congressional district of New Jersey from 1902 to 1903.
- John L. Sampson, former Chairman of Senate Judiciary Committee, New York State Senator
- Hiram Y. Smith, former U.S. Congressman
- Dean P. Taylor, former U.S. Congressman
- Michele Titus, New York State Assembly
- James Manning Tyler, U.S. Congressman from Vermont
- William Freeman Vilas, former U.S. Senator
- Tom Vilsack, U.S. Secretary of Agriculture, former governor of Iowa
- Mary Beth Walsh, New York State Assembly
- Lovely A. Warren, Mayor of Rochester, New York
- Frank L. Wiswall, New York State Assembly, New York State Senate
- Lee Zeldin, former U.S. Congressman

== Practitioners ==
- Stephen F. Brown, Union Army officer in the American Civil War
- James Campbell Matthews, First African American to graduate from law school in New York State
- Wheeler Hazard Peckham, former nominee to the Supreme Court of the United States
- David Soares, Albany County District Attorney
- Mark Zaid, national security law expert

== Other ==
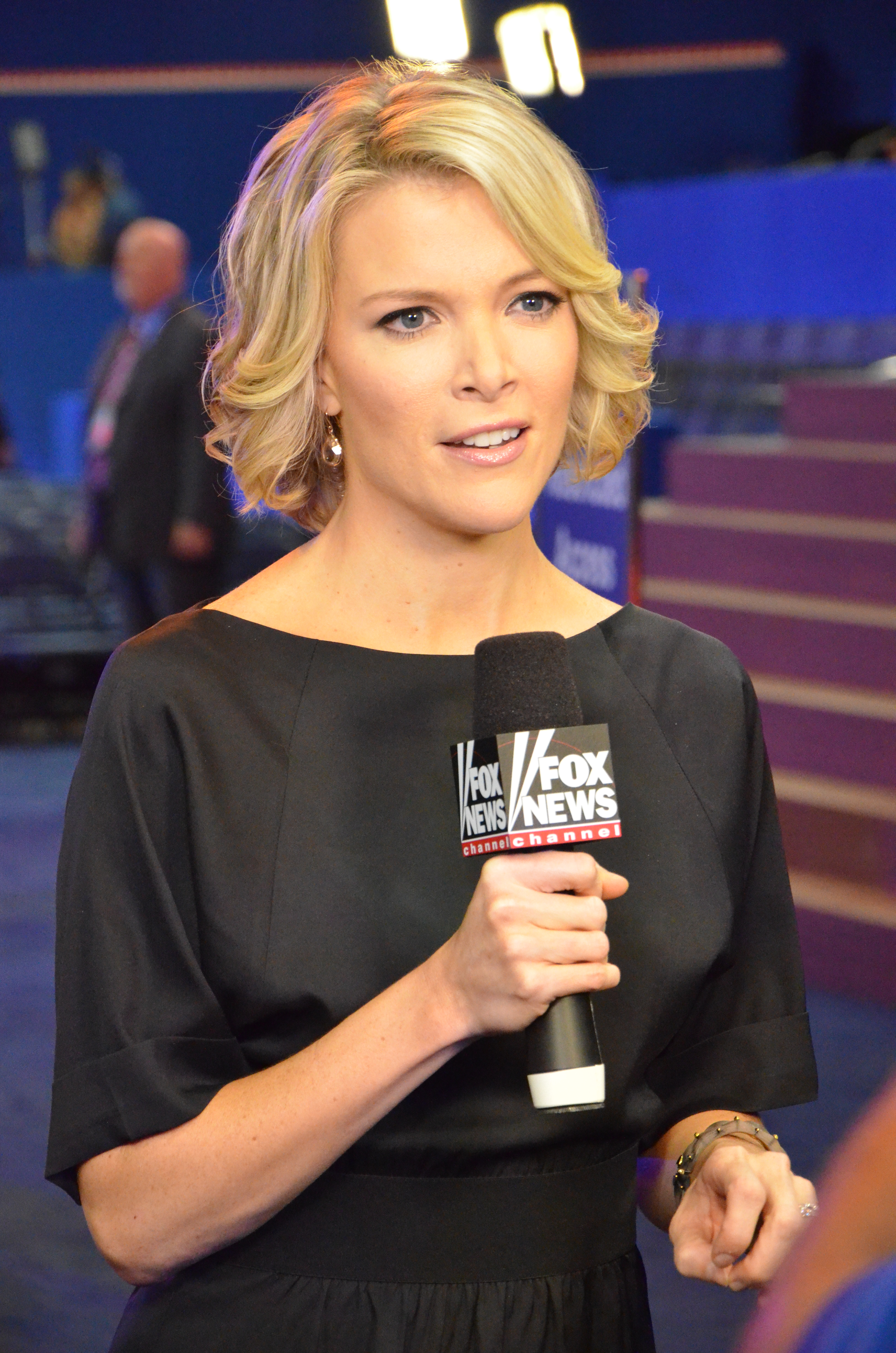
Megyn Kelly news anchor, Fox News Channel

- John Sanford Barnes, Navy officer, naval historian
- Jessica Bird, novelist
- Barry M. Costello, Navy admiral
- Charles Crozat Converse, composer
- Marvin Dana, author and magazine editor
- Kim Gannon, songwriter
- Thomas Hamlin Hubbard, attorney, business executive, Union Army officer who attained the rank of brigadier general brevet.
- Megyn Kelly, news anchor, Fox News Channel
- Barry Kramer, pro basketball player and jurist
- Richard Parsons, Chairman & former CEO of Time Warner; interim CEO of the Los Angeles Clippers
- George W. Peckham, entomologist
- Morris Silverman, philanthropist and businessman
- Kate Stoneman, first woman admitted to the New York State Bar
- Edward J. Westcott, Adjutant General of New York
