= William H. Taylor (judge) =

American judge (1863–1926)

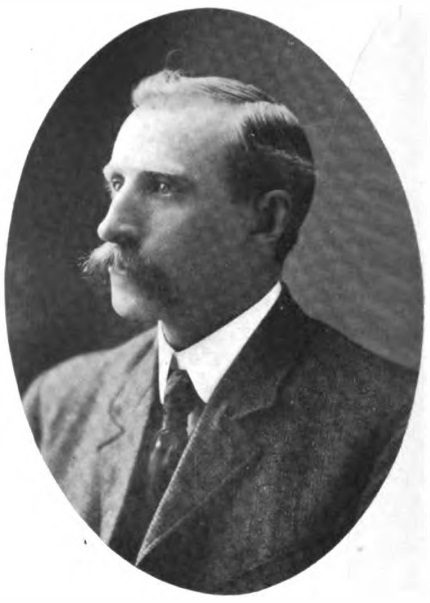
- Portrait of Taylor from the November 1906 edition of The Vermonter magazine.

Associate Justice of the Vermont Supreme Court
- In office 1913–1926
- Preceded by: George M. Powers
- Succeeded by: Frank L. Fish

Judge of the Vermont Superior Court
- In office 1907–1913
- Preceded by: None (position created)
- Succeeded by: Leighton P. Slack

Member of the Vermont Senate
- In office 1906–1907 Serving with Stephen D. Morse
- Preceded by: Leighton P. Slack, Herman P. Simpson
- Succeeded by: Edward T. Fairbanks, Joseph T. Gleason
- Constituency: Caledonia County

Member of the Vermont House of Representatives
- In office 1900–1902
- Preceded by: George L. Johnson
- Succeeded by: John A. Dixon
- Constituency: Hardwick

State's Attorney of Caledonia County, Vermont
- In office 1894–1898
- Preceded by: Henry C. Bates
- Succeeded by: Leighton P. Slack

Personal details
- Born: July 18, 1863 Wheelock, Vermont
- Died: March 27, 1926 (aged 62) Burlington, Vermont
- Resting place: Hardwick Center Cemetery, Hardwick, Vermont
- Spouse: Nettie I. Clark
- Children: 4
- Education: Dartmouth College
- Occupation: Lawyer, Judge

William H. Taylor (July 18, 1863 – March 27, 1926) was a Vermont attorney, politician, and judge. He was notable for his service as an associate justice of the Vermont Supreme Court from 1913 to 1926.

== Early life ==
William Henry Taylor was born in Wheelock, Vermont on July 18, 1863, the son of Benjamin Franklin Taylor and Amanda M. (Stetson) Taylor. He was raised in Wheelock and Hardwick, and graduated from Hardwick Academy in 1882. He then attended Dartmouth College, from which he graduated in 1886.

== Start of career ==
Taylor worked as a school teacher and administrator; he was principal of Hardwick Academy from 1886 to 1889, and school supervisor of Caledonia County from 1889 to 1891. From 1891 to 1906, Taylor was Caledonia County's examiner of teachers. He studied law with Henry Clay Ide and Wendell Phillips Stafford while working as an educator, and attained admission to the bar in 1892. He practiced in Hardwick as the partner of Walter A. Dutton, who served as a judge of the Vermont Superior Court and a member of the Vermont Public Service Commission.

== Continued career ==
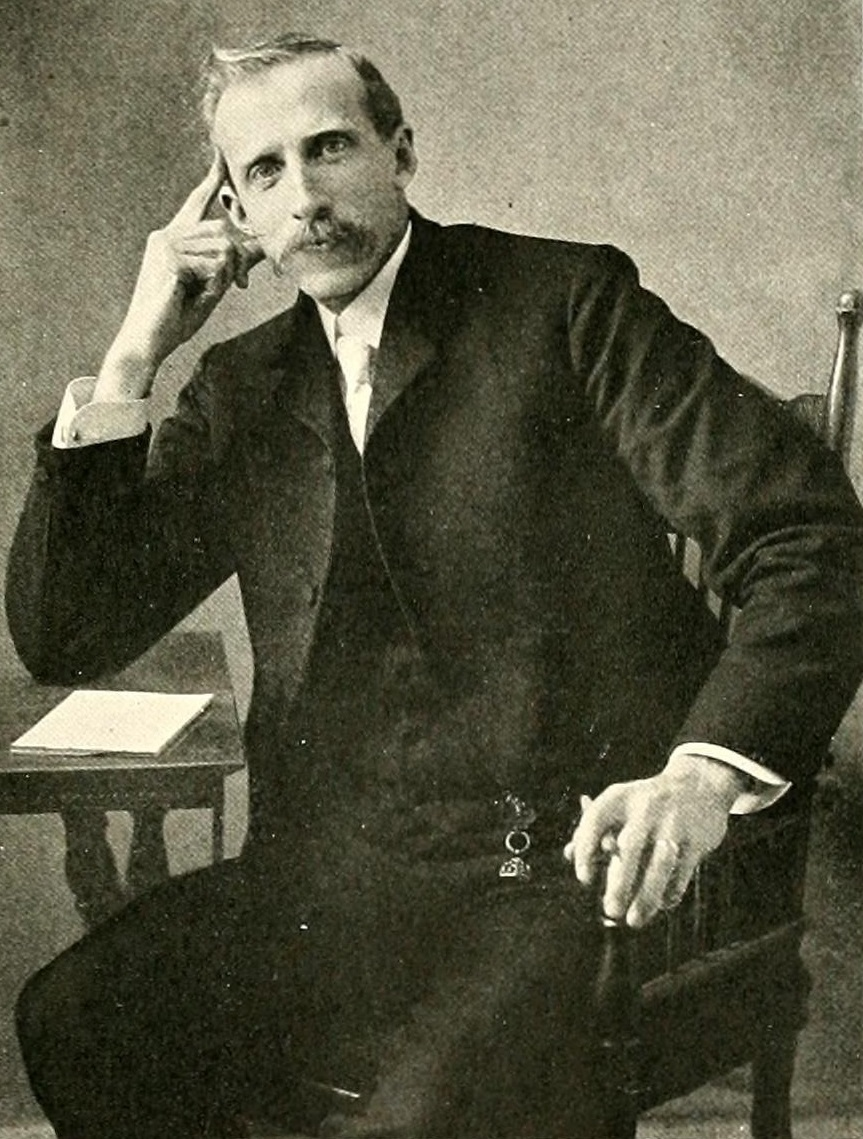
From 1904's Successful Vermonters; A Modern Gazetteer of Caledonia, Essex, and Orleans Counties

A Republican, Taylor served in local offices including president of Hardwick's village trustees. He was Caledonia County State's Attorney from 1894 to 1898. From 1900 to 1902 he was a member of the Vermont House of Representatives. From 1906 to 1907 he was a member of the Vermont Senate.

== Career as judge ==
In 1906, Taylor was appointed a judge of the Vermont Superior Court. He served until 1913, when he was appointed an associate justice of the Vermont Supreme Court. Associate Justice George M. Powers had been appointed Chief Justice, and Taylor was named to the position vacated by Powers.

Taylor remained on the state Supreme Court until his death, and was succeeded by Frank L. Fish.

== Death and burial ==
Taylor died at his son's home in Burlington on March 27, 1926. He was buried at Hardwick Center Cemetery in Hardwick.

== Family ==
In 1887, Taylor married Nettie I. Clark (1862–1930) of Hardwick. They were the parents of four children—Harold F. (1890–1941), Florence Mary (1894–1985), Mildred I. (1897–1982), and Cecyle A. (1901–1981).

== Sources ==
=== Books ===
- Bigelow, Walter J. (1919). Vermont, Its Government. Montpelier, VT: Historical Publishing Company.
- Jeffrey, William H. (1904). Successful Vermonters; A Modern Gazetteer of Caledonia, Essex, and Orleans Counties. East Burke, VT: Historical Publishing Company.
- Marquis, Albert Nelson (1909). Who's Who in New England. Vol. 1. Chicago, IL: A. N. Marquis.

=== Magazines ===
- Cummings, Charles R. (November 1906). "The New Judiciary System: The Board of Superior Judges; William H. Taylor". The Vermonter. White River Junction, VT: Chas. R. Cummings.

=== Newspapers ===
- "General Satisfaction". The Burlington Free Press. Burlington, Vermont. September 26, 1913 – via Newspapers.com.
- "Obituary: Judge William H. Taylor". The Burlington Free Press. Burlington, Vermont. March 29, 1926 – via Newspapers.com.
- "Throng Pay Tribute to Memory of Justice William H. Taylor". The Burlington Free Press. Burlington, Vermont. March 31, 1926 – via Newspapers.com.
- "Judge Fish to Succeed Taylor". The Burlington Free Press. Burlington, Vermont. April 1, 1926 – via Newspapers.com.
- "Mrs. Nettie Taylor Dies at Hardwick". The Burlington Free Press. Burlington, Vermont. October 22, 1920 – via Newspapers.com.
- "Obituary, Harold F. Taylor". The Burlington Free Press. Burlington, Vermont. October 24, 1941 – via Newspapers.com.
- "Obituary, Mildred Taylor". The Hardwick Gazette. Hardwick, Vermont. October 12, 1982 – via Newspapers.com.

=== Internet ===
- "1900 United States Federal Census, Entry for Mildred I. Taylor". Ancestry.com. Provo, UT: Ancestry.com LLC. 1900.
- Corley, Edward B. (City Clerk) (March 27, 1926). "Vermont Death Records, 1909-2008, Entry for William Henry Taylor". Ancestry.com. Provo, UT: Ancestry.com LLC.
- "Cecyle A. Taylor in the Vermont Marriage Records, 1909-2008". Ancestry.com. Provo, UT: Ancestry.com LLC. 1929.
- "Cecyle Raver in the U.S. Social Security Death Index, 1935-2014". Ancestry.com. Provo, UT: Ancestry.com LLC. 1981.
- Collier, Bridget A. (Town Clerk) (March 10, 1985). "Vermont Death Records, 1909-2008, Entry for Florence Mary Lane". Ancestry.com. Provo, UT: Ancestry.com LLC.

Political offices
Preceded by George M. Powers	Associate Justice of the Vermont Supreme Court; 1913–1926	Succeeded by Frank L. Fish
