= Leighton P. Slack =

American judge

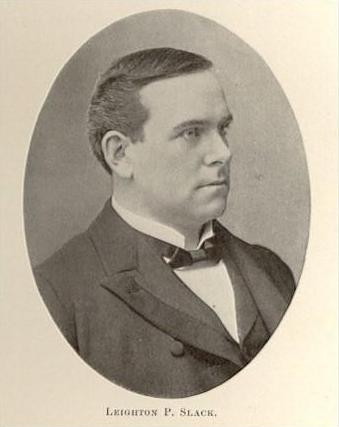
- From 1904's Successful Vermonters by William H. Jeffrey

Associate Justice of the Vermont Supreme Court
- In office 1919–1938
- Preceded by: Seneca Haselton
- Succeeded by: Allen R. Sturtevant

48th Lieutenant Governor of Vermont
- In office 1910–1912
- Governor: John A. Mead
- Preceded by: John A. Mead
- Succeeded by: Frank E. Howe

Member of the Vermont Senate from Caledonia County
- In office 1904–1906 Serving with Herman P. Simpson
- Preceded by: Preston H. Graves; Truman R. Stiles
- Succeeded by: William H. Taylor; Stephen D. Morse

State's Attorney of Caledonia County, Vermont
- In office 1898–1900
- Preceded by: William H. Taylor
- Succeeded by: David E. Porter

Personal details
- Born: June 18, 1867 Woodstock, Vermont, U.S.
- Died: March 31, 1938 (aged 70) Montpelier, U.S.
- Resting place: Durant Cemetery, Cabot
- Party: Republican
- Spouse: Leah Dwinnell (m. 1899-1938)
- Children: 1
- Education: Black River Academy, Ludlow, Vermont
- Profession: Lawyer

Leighton Prosper Slack (June 18, 1867 – March 31, 1938) was a Vermont attorney and judge. He served as the 48th lieutenant governor of Vermont from 1910 to 1912 and as a justice of the Vermont Supreme Court from 1914 until his death.

== Biography ==
Leighton Prosper Slack was born in Woodstock, Vermont on June 18, 1867. He graduated from Ludlow's Black River Academy and taught school while studying law.

Slack attained admission to the bar in 1892, and began to practice, first in Barre, and then in St. Johnsbury. While in St. Johsbury, he first practiced as the partner of Alexander Dunnett.

A Republican, Slack served as St Johnsbury's Village President, Caledonia County State's Attorney from 1898 to 1900 and a member of the Vermont Senate from 1904 to 1906.

In 1910, Slack won election as Lieutenant Governor. He served in this position from 1910 to 1912.

In 1913, Slack was appointed a judge of the Vermont Superior Court. He served until being named an associate justice of the Supreme Court in 1914. In January 1915, public outcry over the Vermont General Assembly's failure to reappoint longtime justices Loveland Munson and Seneca Haselton led to resignations and new appointments which returned Munson and Haselton to the bench. As part of this effort, Slack agreed to return to service as a superior court judge.

In 1919, Slack was again appointed an associate justice of the Vermont Supreme Court, and he relocated to Montpelier. Slack served on the court until his death.

During World War I Slack served as Chairman of Vermont's Committee on Public Safety, a board convened by the Governor to mobilize Vermont citizens and materiel for the war effort.

Slack was active in the Vermont and American Bar Associations and the Vermont Historical Society.

Justice Slack died in Montpelier on March 31, 1938.

Party political offices
Preceded by John A. Mead	Republican nominee for Lieutenant Governor of Vermont; 1910	Succeeded by Frank E. Howe
Political offices
Preceded by John A. Mead	Lieutenant Governor of Vermont; 1910–1912	Succeeded by Frank E. Howe
Preceded by Seneca Haselton	Associate Justice of the Vermont Supreme Court; 1919–1938	Succeeded by Allen R. Sturtevant
