= Albert W. Barney Jr. =

American judge from Vermont

Chief Justice of the Vermont Supreme Court
- In office 1974–1982
- Preceded by: James Stuart Holden
- Succeeded by: Franklin S. Billings Jr.

Associate Justice of the Vermont Supreme Court
- In office 1959–1974
- Preceded by: Charles Bayley Adams
- Succeeded by: Robert W. Larrow

Chief Judge of the Vermont Superior Court
- In office 1958–1959
- Preceded by: Percival L. Shangraw
- Succeeded by: Harold C. Sylvester

Judge of the Vermont Superior Court
- In office 1952–1958
- Preceded by: Orrin B. Hughes
- Succeeded by: Leonard W. Morrison

Judge of the Caledonia Municipal Court
- In office 1951–1952
- Preceded by: John Swainbank
- Succeeded by: Kyle T. Brown

Member of the Vermont House of Representatives from St. Johnsbury
- In office 1951–1953
- Preceded by: Fred W. Knowlton
- Succeeded by: Graham S. Newell

Personal details
- Born: October 23, 1920 St. Johnsbury, Vermont
- Died: May 10, 2010 (aged 89) St. Johnsbury, Vermont
- Resting place: Mount Pleasant Cemetery, St. Johnsbury, Vermont
- Education: Yale University; Harvard Law School
- Occupation: Attorney
- Known for: Presided over Vermont's last death penalty case

Military service
- Allegiance: United States
- Branch/service: United States Navy
- Years of service: 1942–1946
- Rank: Lieutenant
- Battles/wars: World War II

Albert Wilkins Barney Jr. (October 23, 1920 – May 10, 2010) was an American lawyer and judge. He became an associated justice of the Vermont Supreme Court in 1959. He became chief justice in 1974, and served until his retirement in 1982.

As a superior court judge, Barney presided over Vermont's last death penalty case in 1953.

== Early life and education ==
Barney was born in St. Johnsbury, Vermont to Albert Wilkins Barney Sr. and Marion Bisbee Barney. He graduated from St. Johnsbury Academy in 1938 and received his undergraduate degree from Yale University. During World War II, Barney served in the United States Navy. Barney owned a restaurant and received his law degree from the Harvard Law School.

== Judicial career ==
=== Lower courts ===
Barney was admitted to the bar in 1949. He served in the Vermont House of Representatives in 1951. Barney became a municipal court judge in 1951 and in 1952 was appointed a superior court judge.

=== State Supreme Court ===
In 1959, Barney was elected to the Vermont Supreme Court and in 1974, became chief justice. He retired from the bench in 1982.

== Death penalty case ==
When Barney was a state court judge, he presided over the trial of Donald DeMag. Convicted and given a death sentence, Demag was the last person to be executed in the electric chair before the state abolished the death penalty.

== Advocacy ==
Barney was active in the American Academy of Judicial Education. He was Chair, Conference of Chief Justices from 1981 to 1982 and a member of National Center for State Courts in 1981.

== Awards ==
In 1979, the American Judges Association presented Barney its Award of Merit which was given to a judge for outstanding contributions to the judiciary. This award is now called the Chief Justice Richard W. Holmes Award.

In 1997, Barney received the Dwayne B. Sherrer Alumni Distinguished Service Award from St. Johnsbury Academy.

== Later life ==
In the 1980s, Barney served regularly as a retired justice. Until 2006, he also continued to serve on the state supreme court.

== Personal life ==
Barney was married to his wife, Helen, for over 60 years. They had three daughters. Barney died at his home in St. Johnsbury on May 10, 2010.

== Selected quotes ==
In making any law work, it is necessary that it be accepted by the general public that this law is fair and necessary. ... The will of the people must be mixed into every decision of the court.

-Albert W. Barney, after being sworn in Chief Justice, 1974

It's not a job, It's such a responsibility.

-Albert W. Barney, after retiring as Chief Justice, 1982

== Succession ==
Legal offices
Preceded by Percival L. Shangraw	Chief Justice of the Vermont Supreme Court; 1974–1982	Succeeded by Franklin S. Billings, Jr.

== Sources ==
- Vermont Supreme Court Vermont Supreme Court Retrieved: 2010-05-15.
