= Percival L. Shangraw =

American judge (1897–1988)

Chief Justice of the Vermont Supreme Court
- In office 1972–1974
- Preceded by: James Stuart Holden
- Succeeded by: Albert W. Barney Jr.

Associate Justice of the Vermont Supreme Court
- In office 1958–1972
- Preceded by: Walter H. Cleary
- Succeeded by: Rudolph J. Daley

Chief Judge of the Vermont Superior Court
- In office 1956–1958
- Preceded by: James Stuart Holden
- Succeeded by: Albert W. Barney Jr.

Judge of the Vermont Superior Court
- In office 1951–1958
- Preceded by: Raymond L. Miles
- Succeeded by: Leonard W. Morrison

Member of the Vermont Senate
- In office January 1951 – February 1951 Serving with Ernest E. Perley
- Preceded by: Simon J. Godfrey, E. Frank Branon
- Succeeded by: Benjamin W. Fisher
- Constituency: Franklin County

Judge of the Franklin County, Vermont Municipal Court
- In office 1935–1947
- Preceded by: Albert W. Butler
- Succeeded by: Percy C. Warner

Personal details
- Born: August 6, 1897 Montgomery, Vermont, U.S.
- Died: December 18, 1988 (aged 91) St. Albans, Vermont, U.S.
- Resting place: Hillside Cemetery, Richford, Vermont, U.S.
- Party: Republican
- Spouse: Ruth Ardell Marvin (m. 1922)
- Children: 2
- Education: Albany Law School
- Occupation: Attorney

Percival L. Shangraw (August 6, 1897 – December 18, 1988) was a Vermont attorney and judge. He is notable for his service as an associate justice of the Vermont Supreme Court from 1958 to 1972, and chief justice from 1972 until 1974.

== Early life ==
Percival Lee Shangraw was born in Montgomery, Vermont on August 6, 1897, the son of Edward J. and Lillian (Murray) Shangraw. He was raised and educated in Richford, and graduated from Richford High School in 1916.

== Career ==
=== Military service ===
Shangraw joined the Vermont National Guard's 1st Infantry Regiment shortly before World War I. This unit was federalized as the 57th Pioneer Infantry Regiment, and completed its training at Camp Greene, North Carolina and Camp Wadsworth, South Carolina, and Shangraw advanced through the ranks to become sergeant major of his battalion. Upon arrival in France, the 57th Pioneer Infantry was designated to provide replacement troops for the 83rd Division, and Shangraw completed officer training and received a second lieutenant's commission in early September 1918. Shangraw was promoted to first lieutenant later that month, and was one of a small number of soldiers designated to reconstitute the regiment and prepare it for transfer to the front lines. The war ended before their training was complete, and Shangraw was with the regiment when it was discharged at Camp Devens, Massachusetts in August 1919.

During World War II, Shangraw was commissioned as a captain in the Vermont State Guard, which performed home guard duties while the Vermont National Guard served overseas. He commanded Company I, 3rd Battalion, which was based in St. Albans, and he was promoted to major before the end of the war.

=== Start of legal career ===
After his World War I service, Shangraw attended Albany Law School, from which he received his LL.B. degree in 1923. From 1923 to 1925, Shangraw was secretary for the Vermont Public Service Commission. He was admitted to the bar in 1925, and established a practice with offices in St. Albans and Richford. He was also a longtime vice president and director of the Richford Savings Bank. A Republican, from 1935 to 1947 he served as judge of the Franklin County municipal court.

In 1950, Shangraw was a successful candidate for the Vermont Senate. He served during the session of 1951, and resigned upon winning a Vermont General Assembly election for appointment as a judge of the Vermont Superior Court. He served until 1958, and advanced by seniority to become the chief judge.

=== Vermont Supreme Court ===
In 1958, Chief Justice Olin M. Jeffords retired from the Vermont Supreme Court. Associate Justice Walter H. Cleary was promoted to Chief Justice, and Shangraw was appointed to succeed Cleary, in keeping with the state's tradition of promoting the chief judge of the superior court to the supreme court as vacancies arose.

In 1972, Shangraw was promoted to chief justice, succeeding James Stuart Holden, who had been appointed to a federal judgeship. He served as chief justice until retiring in 1974, and was succeeded by Albert W. Barney Jr.

== Personal life, death, and legacy ==
In 1922, Shangraw married Ruth Ardell Marvin of Richford. They were the parents of two children, Richard and Norma Jean.

In retirement, Shangraw continued to reside in St. Albans, and continued to hear cases occasionally as a specially assigned judge in Vermont's courts until the mid-1980s. He died in St. Albans on December 18, 1988, and was buried at Hillside Cemetery in Richford.

In October 2014, the courthouse in St. Albans was named for Shangraw. A grandson and Franklin County's assistant judges took part in a ceremony which included the unveiling of a plaque bearing his name.

== Sources ==
=== Newspapers ===
- "High School Class Day Exercises". Burlington Free Press. Burlington, VT. June 9, 1916 – via Newspapers.com.
- "Richford: The Village News". Burlington Free Press. Burlington, VT. March 5, 1918 – via Newspapers.com.
- "St. Albans Guard Members Attend School at Barton". Burlington Free Press. Burlington, VT. February 27, 1945 – via Newspapers.com.
- "Justice Cleary Appointed Chief Justice of Vermont". Bennington Banner. Bennington, VT. Associated Press. February 28, 1958 – via Newspapers.com.
- "Shangraw is State's New Chief Justice". Bennington Banner. Bennington, VT. United Press International. January 22, 1972 – via Newspapers.com.
- "Chief Justice to Step Down". Burlington Free Press. Burlington, VT. Free Press Morning Bureau. January 5, 1974 – via Newspapers.com.
- "Obituary, Percival Lee Shangraw". Burlington Free Press. Burlington, VT. December 19, 1988 – via Newspapers.com.
- Monroe, Michelle (October 30, 2014). "County's courthouse named for Shangraw: Former chief justice resided in St. Albans". St. Albans Messenger. St. Albans, VT.

=== Internet ===
- Rounds, Henry Heath (Town Clerk, Richford, VT) (September 16, 1922). "Vermont Marriage Records, 1909-2008, Entry for Percival Lee Shangraw and Ruth Ardell Marvin". Ancestry.com. Provo, UT: Ancestry.com, LLC.

=== Books ===
- Johnson, Herbert T. (1927). Roster of Vermont Men and Women in the World War. Rutland, VT: The Tuttle Company, Marble City Press – via Ancestry.com.

Political offices
Preceded by Walter H. Cleary	Associate Justice of the Vermont Supreme Court; 1958–1972	Succeeded by Rudolph J. Daley
Preceded by James Stuart Holden	Chief Justice of the Vermont Supreme Court; 1972–1974	Succeeded by Albert W. Barney Jr.
