= Allen R. Sturtevant =

American judge (1879–1966)

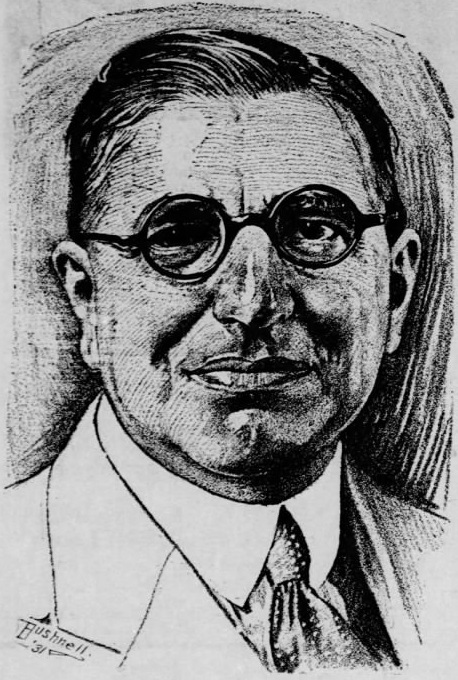
- Burlington Free Press, (Burlington, Vermont) August 31, 1931

Associate Justice of the Vermont Supreme Court
- In office April 1938 – October 1948
- Preceded by: Leighton P. Slack
- Succeeded by: Walter H. Cleary

Chief Judge of the Vermont Superior Court
- In office 1938–1938
- Preceded by: Alfred L. Sherman
- Succeeded by: Olin M. Jeffords

Judge of the Vermont Superior Court
- In office 1929–1938
- Preceded by: Frank D. Thompson
- Succeeded by: Samuel H. Blackmer

State's Attorney of Addison County, Vermont
- In office 1915–1921
- Preceded by: Frank W. Tuttle
- Succeeded by: George W. Stone

Personal details
- Born: August 27, 1879 Granville, New York
- Died: September 15, 1966 (aged 87) Fort Pierce, Florida
- Resting place: Riverview Memorial Park, Fort Pierce, Florida
- Party: Republican
- Spouse: Anna Bonner (m. 1904-1966, his death)
- Children: 3
- Education: University of Vermont; Lincoln-Jefferson College of Law
- Occupation: Attorney; Judge

Allen R. Sturtevant (August 27, 1879 – September 15, 1966) was a Vermont attorney and judge. His most notable work was as an associate justice of the Vermont Supreme Court from 1938 to 1948.

== Early life ==
Allen Robert Sturtevant was born in Granville, New York on August 27, 1879, the son of Royal W. and Susan V. (Oakes) Sturtevant. He was raised and educated in Granville and New Haven, Vermont, and was an 1897 graduate of Beeman Academy in New Haven. He received his Ph.B. from the University of Vermont in 1901. Sturtevant worked as a school teacher in locations including Manlius, New York and Lima, Indiana, and moved to Middlebury, Vermont in 1908.

== Career as an attorney ==
He studied law in Middlebury with Judge Charles I. Button and attorney Ira H. LaFleur, and worked as deputy clerk of the Addison County Court. In 1911, he received his LL.B. degree from Lincoln-Jefferson College of Law in Hammond, Indiana. Sturtevant was admitted to the bar later that year and began a practice in Middlebury. Sturtevant entered politics as a Republican, and served as Addison County State's Attorney from 1915 to 1921. From 1912 to 1929, Sturtevant was Middlebury's village attorney. He also became involved in banking, and was vice president of the Addison County Trust Company from 1926 to 1929. During the governorship of John E. Weeks, Sturtevant served as his executive clerk from 1927 to 1929.

== Judicial career ==
In 1929, Governor Weeks appointed Sturtevant a judge of the Vermont Superior Court. He served until 1938, and advanced through seniority to become the chief judge.

Sturtevant had been chief judge of the Superior Court for only a few months when Leighton P. Slack died. In April 1938, Sturtevant was appointed as an associate justice of the Vermont Supreme Court, filling the vacancy caused by Slack's death. He served until retiring on October 1, 1948, and was succeeded by Walter H. Cleary.

== Awards ==
In 1940, Sturtevant received the honorary degree of LL.D. from Middlebury College.

== Retirement and death ==
In retirement, Sturtevant was a resident of Fort Pierce, Florida. He died there on September 15, 1966, and was buried at Riverview Memorial Park in Fort Pierce.

== Family ==
On June 8, 1904, Sturtevant married Anna Bonner in New York City. They were the parents of three daughters: Viola, Margaret, and Anna.

== Sources ==
=== Books ===
- Marquis, Albert N. (1938). Who's Who in New England. Vol. 3. Chicago: A. N. Marquis Company.

=== Magazines ===
- Sturtevant, Allen R. (June 1, 1941). "Boon Murder Mystery". Middlebury College News Letter. Middlebury, Vermont: Middlebury College.

=== Newspapers ===
- "Allen R. Sturtevant, son of R. W. Sturtevant". Bridport Sun. Bridport, Vermont. January 23, 1902 – via Newspapers.com.
- "Allen R. Sturtevant is at home for vacation". Bridport Sun. Bridport, Vermont. July 23, 1903 – via Newspapers.com.
- "Allen R. Sturtevant of New Haven has entered the office of attorney Ira H. LaFleur and will study law". Middlebury Record. Middlebury, Vermont. October 15, 1908 – via Newspapers.com.
- "Allen R. Sturtevant has been appointed deputy clerk of Addison County". Bridport Sun. Bridport, Vermont. June 29, 1911 – via Newspapers.com.
- "Sturtevant Superior Judge". The Burlington Free Press. Burlington, Vermont. December 16, 1929 – via Newspapers.com.
- "Believers in Vermont: Allen Robert Sturtevant". The Burlington Free Press. Burlington, Vermont. August 31, 1931. p. 7 – via Newspapers.com.
- "Cushing for Superior Court". The Burlington Free Press. Burlington, Vermont. April 22, 1938 – via Newspapers.com.
- "Judge Cleary Will Take Seat on Vt. Supreme Ct. Today". The Burlington Free Press. Burlington, Vermont. Morning Press Bureau. October 1, 1948 – via Newspapers.com.
- "Judge Sturtevant Dies in Florida". The Burlington Free Press. Burlington, Vermont. September 17, 1966 – via Newspapers.com.

=== Internet ===
- "Allen R. Sturtevant in the Florida Death Index, 1877-1998". Ancestry.com. Lehi, Utah: Ancestry.com, LLC. September 15, 1966.

Political offices
Preceded by Leighton P. Slack	Associate Justice of the Vermont Supreme Court; 1938–1948	Succeeded by Walter H. Cleary
