= Benjamin N. Hulburd =

American judge (1898–1964)

Chief Justice of the Vermont Supreme Court
- In office 1959–1963
- Preceded by: Walter H. Cleary
- Succeeded by: James Stuart Holden

Associate Justice of the Vermont Supreme Court
- In office 1955–1959
- Preceded by: Olin M. Jeffords
- Succeeded by: Milford K. Smith

Judge of the Vermont Superior Court
- In office 1949–1955
- Preceded by: Samuel H. Blackmer
- Succeeded by: Natt L. Divoll Jr.

Member of the Vermont House of Representatives from Hyde Park
- In office 1949–1949
- Preceded by: Lula Fletcher Potter
- Succeeded by: O. H. Cook

Judge of the Probate Court for Lamoille County, Vermont
- In office 1941–1949
- Preceded by: Noyes G. Wood
- Succeeded by: Leon E. Ellsworth

State's Attorney for Lamoille County, Vermont
- In office 1928–1935
- Preceded by: Leon E. Ellsworth
- Succeeded by: Clifton G. Parker

Personal details
- Born: May 21, 1898 Hyde Park, Vermont, U.S.
- Died: April 9, 1964 (aged 65) Burlington, Vermont
- Resting place: Hyde Park Village Cemetery, Hyde Park Village, Vermont
- Party: Republican
- Spouse: Dorothy Elizabeth Poustie (m. 1928-1964, his death)
- Relations: Roger W. Hulburd (father)
- Children: 3
- Education: University of Vermont (BA); University of Wisconsin–Madison (MA); Harvard University (LLB)
- Profession: Attorney

Benjamin Noyes Hulburd (May 21, 1898 – April 9, 1964) was an American attorney, politician, and judge who served as an associate justice of the Vermont Supreme Court from 1955 to 1959, and chief justice from 1959 to 1963.

== Early life and education ==
Hulburd was born in Hyde Park, Vermont on May 21, 1898, the son of Roger W. Hulburd and Mabel Julia (Noyes) Hulburd. He graduated from the University of Vermont in 1920, and received his Master of Arts degree from the University of Wisconsin–Madison in 1924. In 1928, he received his LL.B. from Harvard Law School and was admitted to the bar.

== Career ==
Hulburd began a practice in Hyde Park in 1928. A Republican, he was elected state's attorney of Lamoille County soon after becoming a lawyer, and he served until 1935. Hulburd also served in local offices including school board member and village trustee. In 1940, Hulburd was elected Lamoille County Probate Judge, and he served from 1941 to 1949. In 1948, Hulburd was a delegate to the Republican National Convention. He was elected to the Vermont House of Representatives later that year, and he served during the session of 1949.

In 1949, Hulburd was appointed to the Vermont Superior Court. He served until 1955, and advanced through seniority to become the court's chief judge. In 1955, Hulburd was appointed as an associate justice of the Vermont Supreme Court, in keeping with Vermont's tradition of promoting the chief judge of the Superior Court. He succeeded Olin M. Jeffords, who was promoted to chief justice.

In 1959, Hulburd was appointed as Chief Justice, succeeding Walter H. Cleary. He served until retiring in 1963 because of ill health, and was succeeded by James Stuart Holden.

== Death ==
After joining the superior court, Hulburd became a resident of South Burlington, Vermont. He died in a Burlington, Vermont hospital on April 9, 1964, and was buried at Hyde Park Village Cemetery.

== Family ==
In 1928, Hulburd married Dorothy Elizabeth Poustie (1901–1968) of Cambridge, Massachusetts. They were the parents of sons Roger William (1930–1998) and George Poustie (b. 1932), and daughter Dale Elizabeth (b. 1932), the wife of Donald L. LeBlanc of Andover, Massachusetts.

== Sources ==
=== Newspapers ===
- "Benj. H. Hulburd Candidate for Post of Superior Judge". The Burlington Free Press. Burlington, VT. January 12, 1949 – via Newspapers.com.
- "Olin M. Jeffords Becomes State's 31st Chief Justice". The Burlington Free Press. Burlington, VT. February 18, 1955 – via Newspapers.com.
- "Dale Hubbard, Donald L. LeBlanc Married in St. Patrick's Chapel". The Burlington Free Press. Burlington, VT. August 29, 1955 – via Newspapers.com.
- "Retired State Chief Justice Hulburd Dies". The Burlington Free Press. Burlington, VT. April 10, 1964 – via Newspapers.com.

=== Books ===
- Armstrong, Howard E. (1959). Vermont Legislative Directory. Montpelier, VT: Vermont Secretary of State.

=== Internet ===
- Commonwealth of Massachusetts (1928). "Massachusetts Marriage Index, 1901-1955 and 1966-1970, Entries for Benjamin Noyes Hulburd and Dorothy Elizabeth Poustie". Ancestry.com. Provo, UT: Ancestry.com, LLC.
- Brown, Thelma K. (Assistant City Clerk, Burlington, VT) (April 10, 1964). "Vermont Death Records, 1909-2008, Entry for Benjamin N. Hulburd". Ancestry.com. Provo, UT: Ancestry.com, LLC.
- "Obituary, Donald L. LeBlanc". Chapman, Cole & Gleason. Mashpee, MA: Chapman Family Funeral Homes. August 4, 2012. Archived from the original on January 20, 2018.

Political offices
| Preceded by Olin M. Jeffords | Associate Justice of the Vermont Supreme Court; 1955–1959 | Succeeded by Milford K. Smith |
| Preceded by Walter H. Cleary | Chief Justice of the Vermont Supreme Court; 1959–1963 | Succeeded by James Stuart Holden |
