= Olin M. Jeffords =

American judge (1890–1964)

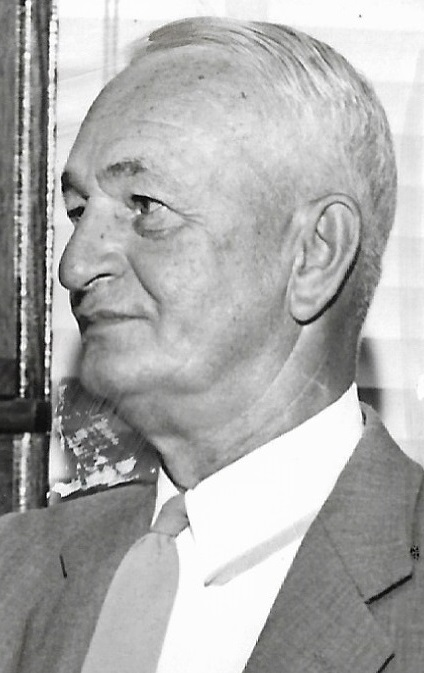
- Close up of Jeffords while taking the oath of office as chief justice in March 1955.

Chief Justice of the Vermont Supreme Court
- In office 1955–1958
- Preceded by: John C. Sherburne
- Succeeded by: Walter H. Cleary

Associate Justice of the Vermont Supreme Court
- In office 1938–1955
- Preceded by: Sherman R. Moulton
- Succeeded by: Benjamin N. Hulburd

Chief Judge of the Vermont Superior Court
- In office 1938–1938
- Preceded by: Allen R. Sturtevant
- Succeeded by: Walter H. Cleary

Judge of the Vermont Superior Court
- In office 1934–1938
- Preceded by: John C. Sherburne
- Succeeded by: Orrin B. Hughes

Personal details
- Born: Olin Merrill Jeffords; June 8, 1890; Enosburg Falls, Vermont
- Died: October 10, 1964 (aged 74); Rutland, Vermont
- Resting place: Missisquoi Cemetery; Enosburg Falls, Vermont
- Political party: Republican
- Spouse: Marion Hausman (m. 1928-1964, his death)
- Children: 2, including Jim Jeffords
- Education: Boston University Law School
- Occupation: Attorney; Judge

Olin Merrill Jeffords (June 8, 1890 – October 10, 1964) was an American attorney and judge who served as chief justice of the Vermont Supreme Court. He was the father of U.S. Senator Jim Jeffords.

== Biography ==
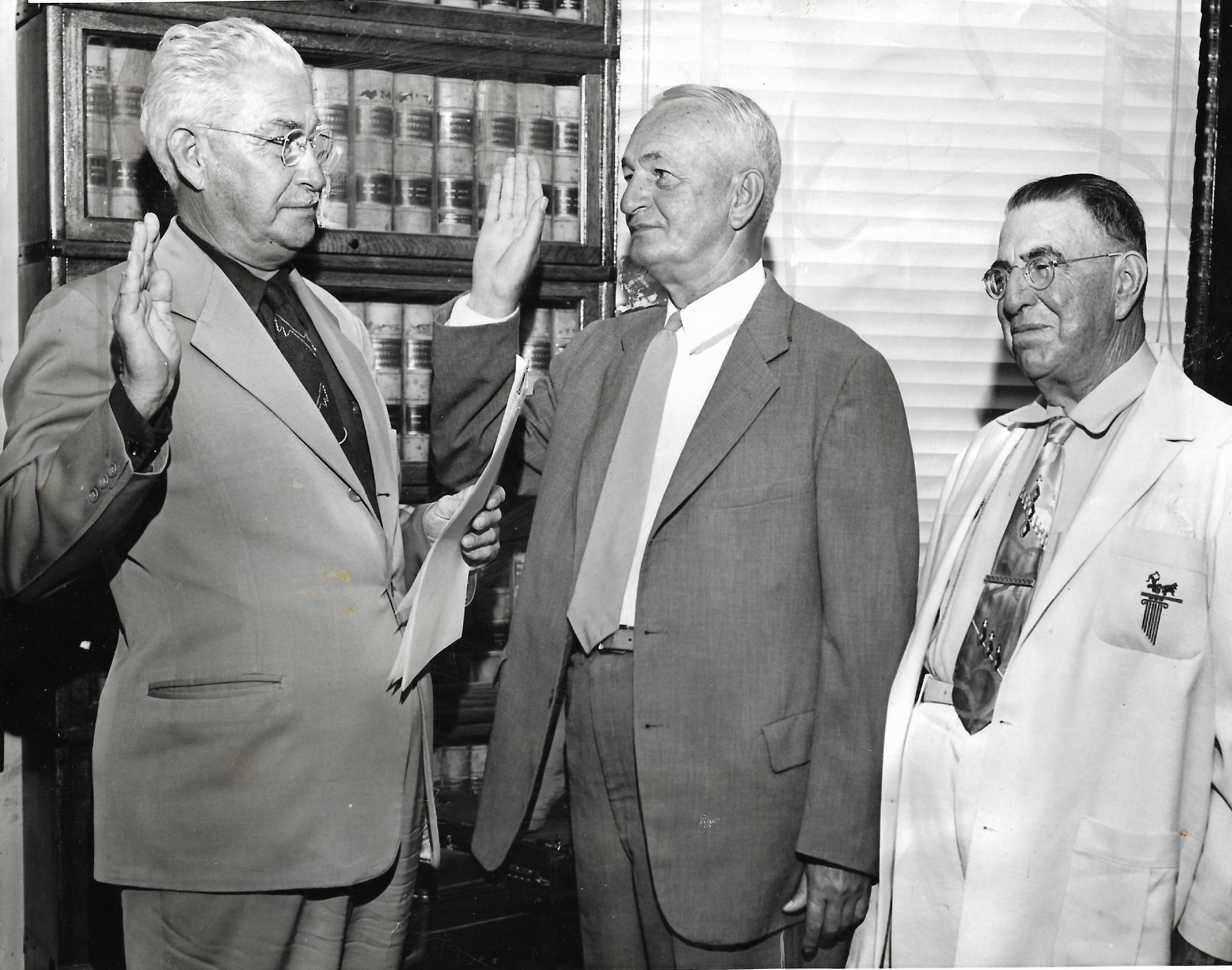
A vacationing Jeffords (center) takes the oath as chief justice from Florida judge Flem C. Dame (left) in March 1955. Retired Vermont Associate Justice Allen R. Sturtevant (right), serves as a witness.

Olin M. Jeffords was born in Enosburg Falls, Vermont on June 8, 1890, the son of James Merrill Jeffords (1863–1926) and Mary D. (Merrill) Jeffords (1849–1918). He graduated from Enosburg Falls High School in 1909 and Phillips Exeter Academy in 1911. Jeffords worked in his father's drug store until 1915, when he decided to attend law school. He graduated from Boston University Law School in 1918, was admitted to the bar, and became an attorney.

He practiced with Ropes & Gray in Boston, and then returned to Vermont to practice in Ludlow with the firm of William W. Stickney and John G. Sargent. He later moved to Rutland, where he continued to practice as a partner in a firm that grew to include several prominent attorneys, including Leonard F. Wing. A Republican, in 1934 Jeffords was appointed a Judge of the Vermont Superior Court. Jeffords rose by seniority to become the court's chief judge, a post he held briefly in 1938. Later in 1938, Jeffords was appointed an associate justice of the Vermont Supreme Court, in keeping with Vermont's tradition of promoting the chief judge of the Superior Court as Supreme Court vacancies arose. He filled the vacancy caused by the death of Chief Justice George M. Powers and promotion of Associate Justice Sherman R. Moulton to succeed Powers.

In 1955 Jeffords became Chief Justice of the Vermont Supreme Court, succeeding John C. Sherburne, who had retired. Jeffords served until resigning in 1958. He was succeeded by Walter H. Cleary.

== Death and burial ==
Jeffords died in Rutland on October 10, 1964. He was buried at Missisquoi Cemetery in Enosburg Falls.

== Awards and honors ==
In 1939 Jeffords was awarded the honorary degree of LL.D. from Boston University.

In 2006 James Jeffords established the Olin M. Jeffords Scholarship at Vermont Law School, which is intended to benefit students pursuing a career in public service.

== Family ==
In 1928 Jeffords married Marion Hausman (1895-1977). They were the parents of two children: Mary Jeffords Mills (1932-2009); and James Merrill Jeffords (1934-2014).
