= List of justices of the Vermont Supreme Court =

Following is a list of justices of the Vermont Supreme Court:

== Current membership ==
Title	Name	Joined the Court	Appointed by
Chief Justice	Paul L. Reiber	2003	Jim Douglas
Associate Justice	Harold Eaton Jr.	2014	Peter Shumlin
Associate Justice	Nancy Waples	2022	Phil Scott
Associate Justice	Christina Nolan	2026	Phil Scott
Associate Justice	Michael P. Drescher	2026	Phil Scott

== All justices ==
Judge	Began active service	Ended active service	Notes
Moses Robinson	1778; 1782; 1785	1780; 1783; 1788	Chief Judge.
John Shepardson	1778	1779	
John Fassett Jr.	1778	1785	
Thomas Chandler Jr.	1778	1778	
John Throop	1778	1780	
Paul Spooner	1779	1788	Chief Judge in 1784.
Increase Moseley	1780	1780	
Elisha Payne	1781	1782	Chief Judge; removed from the court by the dissolution of the union with towns in New Hampshire in February 1782 and replaced by Moses Robinson.
Jonas Fay	1781	1782	
Simeon Olcott	1782	1782	
Peter Olcott	1782	1784	
Thomas Porter	1783	1785	
Nathaniel Niles	1784	1787	
Nathaniel Chipman	1786; 1789; 1796; 1813	1786; 1790; 1796; 1814	Removed in 1786 by reduction of the court to three judges. Chief Judge from 1789 to 1790, in 1796, and from 1813 to 1814.
Luke Knowlton	1786	1786	Removed by reduction of the court to three judges.
Stephen R. Bradley	1788	1788	
Noah Smith	1789; 1798	1790; 1800	
Samuel Knight	1789	1793	Chief Judge from 1791 to 1793.
Elijah Paine	1791	1793	
Isaac Tichenor	1791	1795	Chief Judge from 1794 to 1795.
Lot Hall	1794	1800	
Enoch Woodbridge	1794	1800	Chief Judge from 1798 to 1800.
Israel Smith	1797	1797	Chief Judge.
Jonathan Robinson	1801	1806	Chief Judge.
Royall Tyler	1801	1812	Chief Judge from 1807 to 1812.
Stephen Jacob	1801	1802	
Theophilus Harrington	1803	1812	
Jonas Galusha	1807	1808	
David Fay	1809	1812	
Daniel Farrand	1813	1814	
Jonathan Hatch Hubbard	1813	1814	
Asa Aldis	1815	1815	Chief Judge.
Richard Skinner	1815; 1823	1816; 1828	Chief Judge in 1816, and from 1823 to 1828.
James Fisk	1815	1816	
William A. Palmer	1816	1816	
Dudley Chase	1817	1820	Chief Judge.
Joel Doolittle	1817; 1824	1822; 1824	
William Brayton	1817	1821	
Cornelius P. Van Ness	1821	1822	Chief Judge.
Charles K. Williams	1822; 1829	1823; 1845	Chief Judge from 1834 to 1845
Asa Aikens	1823	1824	
Samuel Prentiss	1825	1829	Chief Judge in 1829.
Titus Hutchinson	1825	1833	Chief Judge from 1830 to 1833.
Stephen Royce	1825; 1829	1826; 1851	Chief Judge from 1846 to 1851.
Bates Turner	1827	1828	
Ephraim Paddock	1828	1830	
John C. Thompson	1830	1830	
Nicholas Baylies	1831	1833	
Samuel S. Phelps	1831	1837	
Jacob Collamer	1834	1841	
John Mattocks	1834	1835	
Isaac F. Redfield	1836	1859	Chief Judge from 1852 to 1859.
Milo Lyman Bennett	1838; 1852	1849; 1858	
William Hebard	1842; 1844	1842; 1844	
Daniel Kellogg	1843; 1845	1843; 1850	
Hiland Hall	1846	1849	
Charles Davis	1846	1847	
Luke P. Poland	1848; 1857	1849; 1864	Chief Judge from 1860 to 1864.
Pierpoint Isham	1851	1856	
Asa O. Aldis	1857	1864	
John Pierpoint	1857	1882	Chief Judge from 1865 to 1882.
James Barrett	1857	1880	
Loyal C. Kellogg	1859	1866	
Asahel Peck	1860	1874	
Herman R. Beardsley	1865	1865	
William C. Wilson	1865	1869	
Benjamin H. Steele	1865	1869	
John Prout	1867	1869	
Hoyt Henry Wheeler	1869	1878	
Homer Elihu Royce	1870	1890	Chief Judge from 1882 to 1890
Timothy P. Redfield	1870	1884	
Jonathan Ross	1870	1899	Chief Judge from 1890 to 1899
H. Henry Powers	1874	1890	
Walter C. Dunton	1877	1879	
Wheelock G. Veazey	1879	1889	
Russell S. Taft	1880	1902	Chief Judge from 1899 to 1902
John W. Rowell	1882	1913	Chief Judge/Chief Justice from 1902 to 1913
William H. Walker	1884	1887	
James Manning Tyler	1887	1908	
Loveland Munson	1890	1917	Chief Justice from 1915 to 1917.
Henry R. Start	1890	1905	
Laforrest H. Thompson	1890	1900	
John H. Watson	1899	1929	Chief Justice from 1917 to 1929.
Wendell Phillips Stafford	1900	1904	
Seneca Haselton	1902; 1908	1906; 1919	
George M. Powers	1904; 1909	1906; 1938	Chief Justice from 1913 to 1915, and from 1929 to 1938.
Willard W. Miles	1905; 1917	1906; 1923	
William H. Taylor	1913	1926	
Leighton P. Slack	1914; 1919	1915; 1938	
Robert E. Healy	1914	1915	
Fred M. Butler	1923	1926	
Frank L. Fish	1926	1927	
Sherman R. Moulton	1926	1949	Chief Justice from 1939 to 1949.
Harrie B. Chase	1927	1929	
Julius A. Willcox	1929	1931	
Frank D. Thompson	1929	1937	
Warner A. Graham	1931	1934	
John C. Sherburne	1934	1955	Chief Justice from 1949 to 1955.
John S. Buttles	1937	1949	
Allen R. Sturtevant	1938	1948	
Olin M. Jeffords	1938	1958	Chief Justice from 1955 to 1958.
Walter H. Cleary	1948	1958	Chief Justice from 1958 to 1959.
Charles Bayley Adams	1949	1959	
Samuel H. Blackmer	1949	1951	
Stephen S. Cushing	1952	1953	
Paul A. Chase	1953	1956	
Benjamin N. Hulburd	1955	1963	Chief Justice from 1959 to 1963.
James Stuart Holden	1956	1972	Chief Justice from 1963 to 1972.
Percival L. Shangraw	1958	1974	Chief Justice from 1972 to 1974.
Albert W. Barney Jr.	1959	1982	Chief Justice from 1974 to 1982.
Milford K. Smith	1959	1976	
Harold C. Sylvester	1963	1964	
F. Ray Keyser Sr.	1964	1975	
Rudolph J. Daley	1972	1980	
Robert W. Larrow	1974	1981	
Franklin S. Billings Jr.	1975	1984	Chief Justice from 1983 to 1984.
William C. Hill	1976	1987	
Wynn Underwood	1981	1984	
Louis P. Peck	1981	1990	
Frederic W. Allen	1984	1997	Chief Justice from 1984 to 1997.
Ernest W. Gibson III	1983	1997	
Thomas L. Hayes	1985	1987	
John Dooley (judge)	1987	2017	
Frank G. Mahady	1987	1988	Appointed but never confirmed by the Senate; withdrew his confirmation request on April 3, 1988.
James L. Morse	1988	2003	
Denise R. Johnson	1990	2011	First woman to serve on the court.
Jeffrey Amestoy	1997	2004	Chief Justice from 1997 to 2004.
Marilyn Skoglund	1997	2019	
Paul Reiber	2003	Present	Chief Justice since 2004.
Brian L. Burgess	2005	2013	
Beth Robinson	2011	2021	Confirmed to be a Judge on the United States Court of Appeals for the Second Circuit.
Geoffrey Crawford	2013	2014	Confirmed to be a Judge on the United States District Court for the District of Vermont.
Harold Eaton Jr.	2014	Present	
Karen Carroll	2017	2025	
William D. Cohen	2019	2025	
Nancy Waples	2022	Present	
Christina Nolan	2026	Present	
Michael P. Drescher	2026	Present	
