= William H. Walker (Vermont judge) =

American judge (1832–1896)

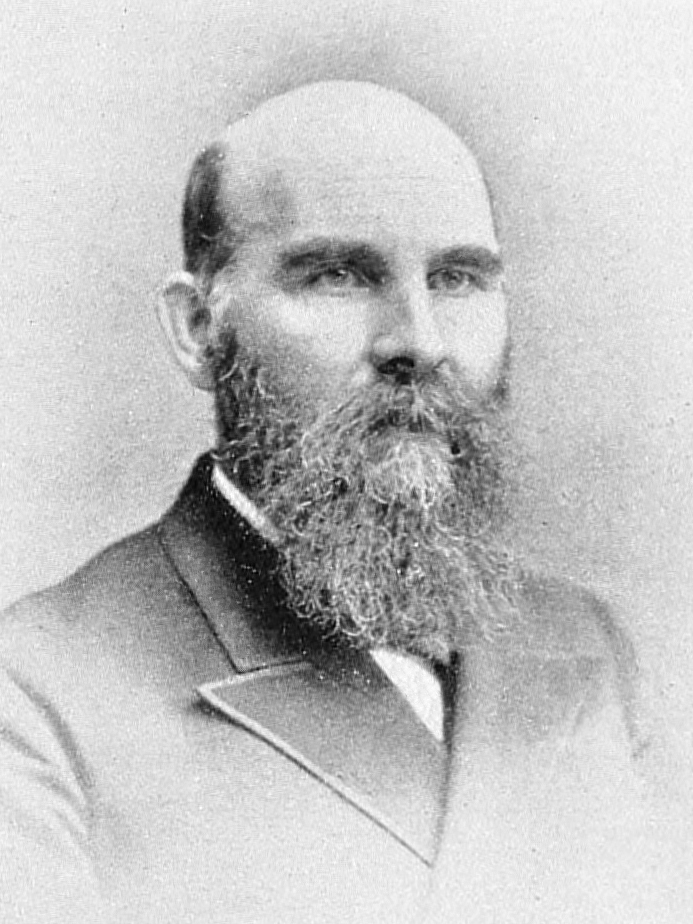
From 1894's Men of Vermont Illustrated

William H. Walker (February 2, 1832 – August 11, 1896) was a Vermont attorney and judge. He was notable for his service as an associate justice of the Vermont Supreme Court from 1884 to 1887.

== Biography ==
William Harris Walker was born in Windham, Vermont on February 2, 1832, the son of Ephraim and Linda (Harris) Walker. He was raised in Londonderry, and attended Leland & Gray Academy in Townshend and Black River Academy in Ludlow. Walker then began his college education at Middlebury College, from which he graduated in 1858. While attending college, Walker taught school in Orleans, Massachusetts and served as principal of West River Academy in South Londonderry, Vermont. In 1857, Walker served as Assistant Secretary of the Vermont Senate. After graduation, Walker was principal of the academy in Little Falls, New York, and began the study of law with Arphaxed Loomis. In 1860 he moved to Ludlow, where he completed his law studies in the office of Frederick C. Robbins and attained admission to the bar in 1861.

In addition to establishing a successful law practice in Ludlow, Walker was active in civic causes. He was a trustee of Middlebury College, and served as president of the board of trustees at Black River Academy. In August 1862, Walker enlisted for the American Civil War as a member of the Union Army's 16th Vermont Infantry. He was commissioned as a captain and selected to command the regiment's Company C, but an attack of typhoid fever followed by a lengthy convalescence led to his discharge in October.

A Republican, Walker served in the Vermont House of Representatives in 1865 and 1866. From 1867 to 1868 he was a member of the Vermont Senate. From 1874 to 1876, Walker served as State's Attorney of Windsor County. In 1878, he was elected Windsor County probate judge, and he served until becoming a member of the Vermont Supreme Court.

Walker served in the Vermont House again in 1884, and was chairman of the judiciary committee. Later that year he was appointed an associate justice of the Vermont Supreme Court, and he served until ill health forced him to resign in 1887.

== Death and burial ==
Walker died in Ludlow on August 11, 1896. He was buried at Pleasant View Cemetery in Ludlow.

== Family ==
In 1859, Walker married Ann Eliza Taylor of Ludlow, the daughter of Ardain G. Taylor and Ruth G. (Pettigrew) Taylor. They were the parents of a son, Frank Ardain Walker (1860-1917).

== Legacy ==
The bridge at Main and Elm streets in Ludlow, the village's primary intersection, is named the William H. Walker bridge.

== Sources ==
=== Books ===
- Aldrich, Lewis Cass; Holmes, Frank R. (1891). History of Windsor County, Vermont. Syracuse, NY: D. Mason & Co. p. 842.
- Tucker, Rebecca Woodbury (2000). Cemetery Inscriptions in Ludlow, Vermont. Ludlow, VT: R. W. Tucker.
- Ullery, Jacob G. (1894). Men of Vermont Illustrated. Brattleboro, VT: Transcript Publishing Company.
- Wiley, Edgar J. (1917). Catalogue of Officers and Students of Middlebury College. Middlebury, VT: Middlebury College.

=== Newspapers ===
- Fortin, Aiyana (January 18, 2017). "Walker Bridge will be closing this June". Vermont Journal. Ludlow, VT.

Political offices
Preceded by Timothy P. Redfield	Justice of the Vermont Supreme Court; 1884–1887	Succeeded by James Manning Tyler
