= Walter H. Cleary =

American judge (1887–1974)

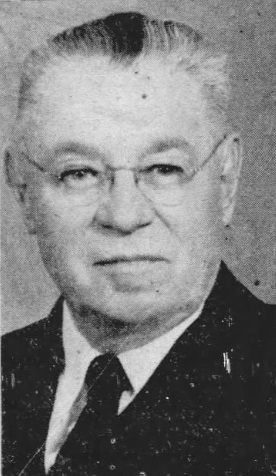
- The Newport Daily Express, February 28, 1958

Chief Justice of the Vermont Supreme Court
- In office 1958–1959
- Preceded by: Olin M. Jeffords
- Succeeded by: Benjamin N. Hulburd

Associate Justice of the Vermont Supreme Court
- In office 1948–1958
- Preceded by: Allen R. Sturtevant
- Succeeded by: Percival L. Shangraw

Chief Judge of the Vermont Superior Court
- In office 1938–1948
- Preceded by: Olin M. Jeffords
- Succeeded by: Charles Bayley Adams

Judge of the Vermont Superior Court
- In office 1934–1938
- Preceded by: Fred G. Bicknell
- Succeeded by: Orrin B. Hughes

Personal details
- Born: November 17, 1887 Lyndonville, Vermont, U.S.
- Died: April 12, 1974 (aged 86) Newport, Vermont, U.S.
- Resting place: St. Elizabeth's Cemetery, Lyndonville, Vermont, U.S.
- Party: Republican
- Spouse: Arlene M. Decoteau (m. 1922)
- Children: 2
- Education: Middlebury College; Boston University School of Law
- Profession: Attorney

Walter Henry Cleary (November 17, 1887 – April 12, 1974) was a Vermont attorney and judge. His career was most notable for his service as an associate justice of the Vermont Supreme Court from 1948 to 1958, and chief justice from 1958 to 1959.

== Early life ==
Cleary was born in Lyndonville, Vermont on November 17, 1887, the son of John and Mary Louise (McArthur) Cleary. He was educated in Lyndonville, and graduated from Lyndon Institute in 1906. Cleary was a 1911 graduate of Middlebury College (A.B.) (Phi Beta Kappa, Delta Upsilon, Phi Delta Phi), and taught at the Mitchell School in Billerica, Massachusetts from 1911 to 1913. He was a 1915 graduate of Boston University School of Law (LL.B.).

== Early career ==
Cleary practiced law in Newport. A Republican, from 1916 to 1934 he was a U.S. Commissioner, empowered to conduct initial hearings on cases including illegal entry into the United States and Prohibition Amendment violations. He was Newport's city attorney from 1922 to 1934, and was president of the Vermont Bar Association from 1932 to 1933. Cleary was president of the National Bank of Newport from 1933 to 1934.

In addition to his career as an attorney, Cleary was a trustee of Middlebury College, Saint Michael's College, Lyndon Institute and the Vermont State Library. He was a longtime member of St. Mary Star of the Sea Catholic Church in Newport. Cleary was also active in the Knights of Columbus, and held several leadership roles at the local and state level.

== Career as judge ==
In 1934, Cleary was appointed a judge of the Vermont Superior Court. He advanced through seniority to become the court's chief judge in 1938, and served in this position until 1948.

In 1948, Cleary was appointed an associate justice of the Vermont Supreme Court, replacing Allen R. Sturtevant, who had retired. He served until 1958, when he was appointed to replace Olin M. Jeffords as chief justice. He held this post until retiring in March 1959, which was required because he had reached the mandatory retirement age of 70. He was succeeded as chief justice by Benjamin N. Hulburd.

== Awards ==
Cleary received the honorary degree of LL.D. from the College of the Holy Cross in 1943. In 1950, he was awarded an honorary J.S.D. from Suffolk University Law School. He was awarded an LL.D. from Saint Michael's College in 1958.

== Death and burial ==
Cleary died at a nursing home in Newport on April 12, 1974. He was buried at St. Elizabeth's Cemetery in Lyndonville.

== Family ==
In 1917, Cleary married Arlene M. Decoteau. They were the parents of a son, John McArthur Cleary (1918–1984), an editorial writer for the Hartford Times, and a daughter, Louise Ellen (1920–2006), the wife of Charles Horvath.

== Sources ==
=== Books ===
- Armstrong, Howard E. (1951). Vermont Legislative Directory. Montpelier, VT: Vermont Secretary of State.
- Romig, Walter (1947). The American Catholic Who's Who. Vol. 7. Grosse Point, MI: Walter Romig.
- Wiley, Edgar J. (1917). Catalogue of Officers and Students of Middlebury College. Middlebury, VT: Middlebury College.

=== Newspapers ===
- "Gov. Johnson Names Cleary Supreme Court Chief Justice". Burlington Free Press. Burlington, VT. Morning Press Bureau. February 28, 1958 – via Newspapers.com.
- "Vt. Chief Justice to receive honorary Degree from SMC". Burlington Free Press. Burlington, VT. May 28, 1958 – via Newspapers.com.
- "Vt. Supreme Court Convenes March Term Wednesday". Burlington Free Press. Burlington, VT. Morning Press Bureau. March 3, 1959 – via Newspapers.com.
- "Judge Cleary Dies, Was Chief Justice". Burlington Free Press. Burlington, VT. April 13, 1974 – via Newspapers.com.

Political offices
Preceded by Allen R. Sturtevant	Associate Justice of the Vermont Supreme Court; 1948–1958	Succeeded by Percival L. Shangraw
Preceded by Olin M. Jeffords	Chief Justice of the Vermont Supreme Court; 1958–1959	Succeeded by Benjamin N. Hulburd
