= James Stuart Holden =

American judge

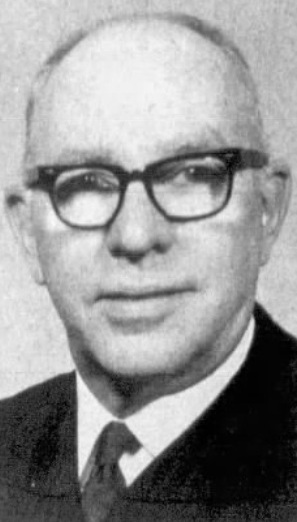
- Bennington Banner, November 12, 1971

Senior Judge of the United States District Court for the District of Vermont
- In office January 29, 1984 – November 18, 1996

Chief Judge of the United States District Court for the District of Vermont
- In office 1972–1983
- Preceded by: Bernard Joseph Leddy
- Succeeded by: Albert Wheeler Coffrin

Judge of the United States District Court for the District of Vermont
- In office November 30, 1971 – January 29, 1984
- Appointed by: Richard Nixon
- Preceded by: James L. Oakes
- Succeeded by: Franklin S. Billings Jr.

Chief Justice of the Vermont Supreme Court
- In office 1963–1972
- Preceded by: Benjamin N. Hulburd
- Succeeded by: Percival L. Shangraw

Associate Justice of the Vermont Supreme Court
- In office 1956–1963
- Preceded by: Paul A. Chase
- Succeeded by: Harold C. Sylvester

Judge of the Vermont Superior Court
- In office 1949–1956
- Preceded by: Henry F. Black
- Succeeded by: F. Ray Keyser Sr.

Chairman of the Vermont Public Service Commission
- In office 1948–1949
- Preceded by: Paul A. Chase
- Succeeded by: N. Henry Press

State's Attorney of Bennington County, Vermont
- In office 1947–1948
- Preceded by: William T. Jerome Jr.
- Succeeded by: Waldo C. Holden

Personal details
- Born: January 29, 1914 Bennington, Vermont, US
- Died: November 18, 1996 (aged 82) Longwood, Florida, US
- Resting place: Park Lawn Cemetery, Bennington, Vermont
- Party: Republican
- Spouse: Helen Elizabeth Vetal (m. 1941)
- Children: 3
- Parent(s): Edward Henry Holden; Mary Anstiss (Thayer) Holden
- Education: Dartmouth College (A.B.); Albany Law School (LL.B.)
- Profession: Attorney

James Stuart Holden (January 29, 1914 – November 18, 1996) was an American attorney and judge. He served as an associate justice and chief justice of the Vermont Supreme Court and later as a judge of the United States District Court for the District of Vermont.

== Early life ==
Born in Bennington, Vermont, Holden received an A.B. degree from Dartmouth College in 1935 and an LL.B. from Albany Law School in 1938. He was in private practice in Bennington from 1938 to 1941.

== Military service ==
Holden was in the United States Army during World War II, serving from 1941 to 1945, achieving the rank of major while serving in the Pacific Theater as a member of the 43rd Infantry Division's 172nd Infantry Regiment. He remained in the military after the war, and was executive officer of the Vermont Army National Guard's 1st Battalion, 172nd Infantry Regiment until resigning in 1948. In 1949, he was appointed inspector general of the National Guard's 43rd Infantry Division and promoted to lieutenant colonel. He resigned again in 1950.

== Continued career ==
He returned to private practice in Bennington from 1945 to 1948, and was also state's attorney of Bennington County from 1947 to 1948. He was Chairman of the Vermont Public Service Commission from 1948 to 1949.

== State judge ==
Holden was a judge of the Vermont Superior Court from 1949 to 1956, and then succeeded Paul A. Chase as an associate justice of the Vermont Supreme Court. He served until 1963, when he succeeded Benjamin N. Hulburd as chief justice. He was succeeded by Harold C. Sylvester, and served as chief justice until 1972, when he was succeeded by Percival L. Shangraw.

== Federal judicial service ==
On November 11, 1971, Holden was nominated by President Richard Nixon to a seat on the United States District Court for the District of Vermont vacated by Judge James L. Oakes. Holden was confirmed by the United States Senate on November 23, 1971, and received his commission on November 30, 1971. He served as Chief Judge from 1972 to 1983, assuming senior status on January 29, 1984. Holden served in that capacity until his death.

== Death and burial ==
Holden died in Longwood, Florida on November 18, 1996.

Legal offices
Preceded by James L. Oakes	Judge of the United States District Court for the District of Vermont; 1971–1984	Succeeded by Franklin S. Billings Jr.
Preceded by Bernard Joseph Leddy	Chief Judge of the United States District Court for the District of Vermont; 1972–1983	Succeeded by Albert Wheeler Coffrin
