= Ludlow (village), Vermont =

Ludlow, Vermont
- Village
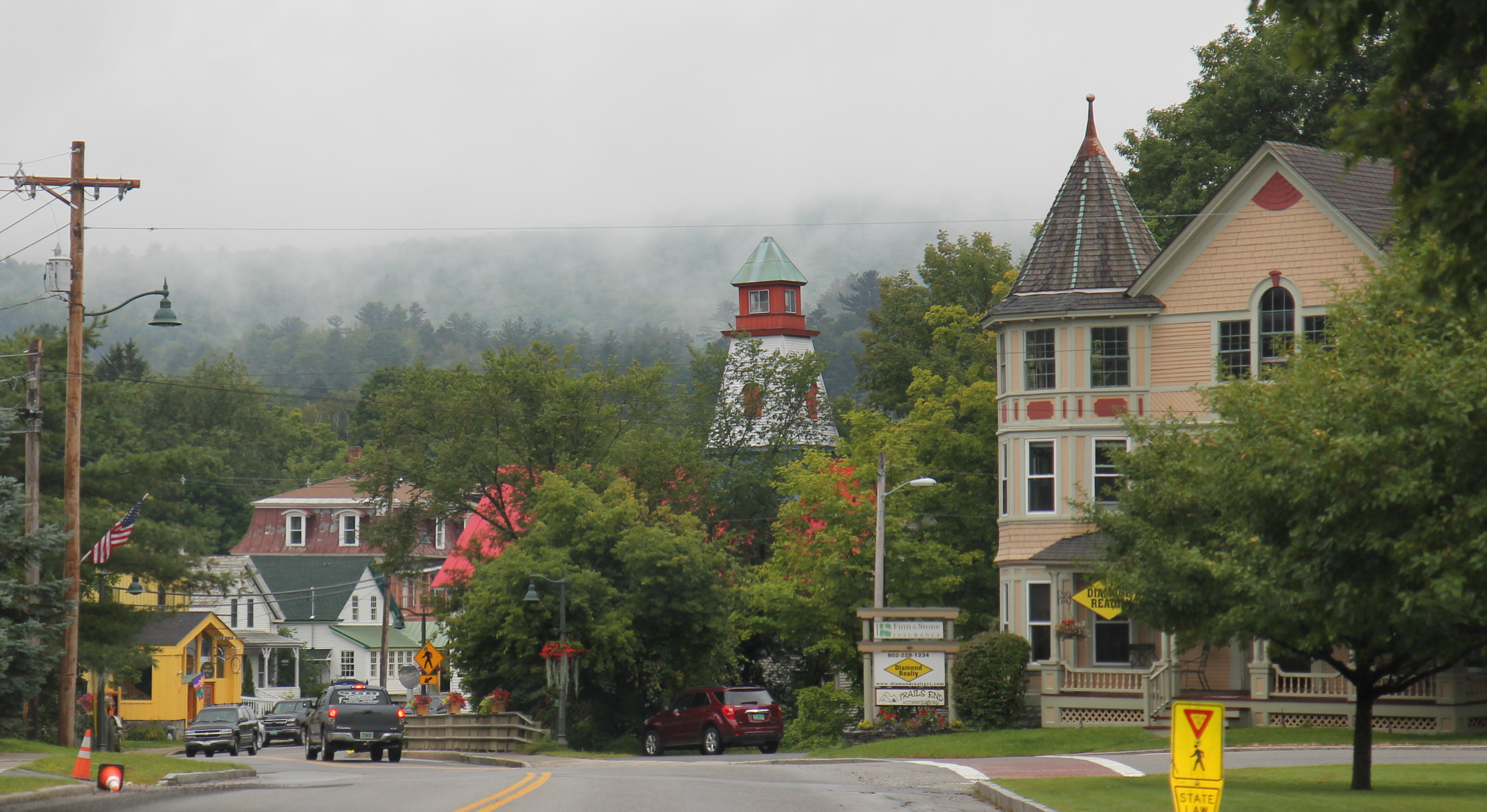
- Downtown in 2014

- Location in Windsor County and the state of Vermont
- Coordinates: 43°23′50″N 72°41′39″W
- Country: United States
- State: Vermont
- County: Windsor
- Town: Ludlow

Area
  - Total: 1.36 sq mi (3.52 km^{2})
  - Land: 1.34 sq mi (3.47 km^{2})
  - Water: 0.019 sq mi (0.05 km^{2})
- Elevation: 1,027 ft (313 m)

Population (2020)
  - Total: 773
  - Density: 577/sq mi (222.8/km^{2})
- Time zone: UTC-5 (Eastern (EST))
  - Summer (DST): UTC-4 (EDT)
- ZIP code: 05149
- Area code: 802
- FIPS code: 50-41200
- GNIS feature ID: 2378312
- Website: www.ludlow.vt.us

Ludlow is an incorporated village within the town of Ludlow, Windsor County, Vermont, United States. It is sometimes called Ludlow Village, to distinguish it from the surrounding town of the same name. The population was 773 at the 2020 census.

== History ==
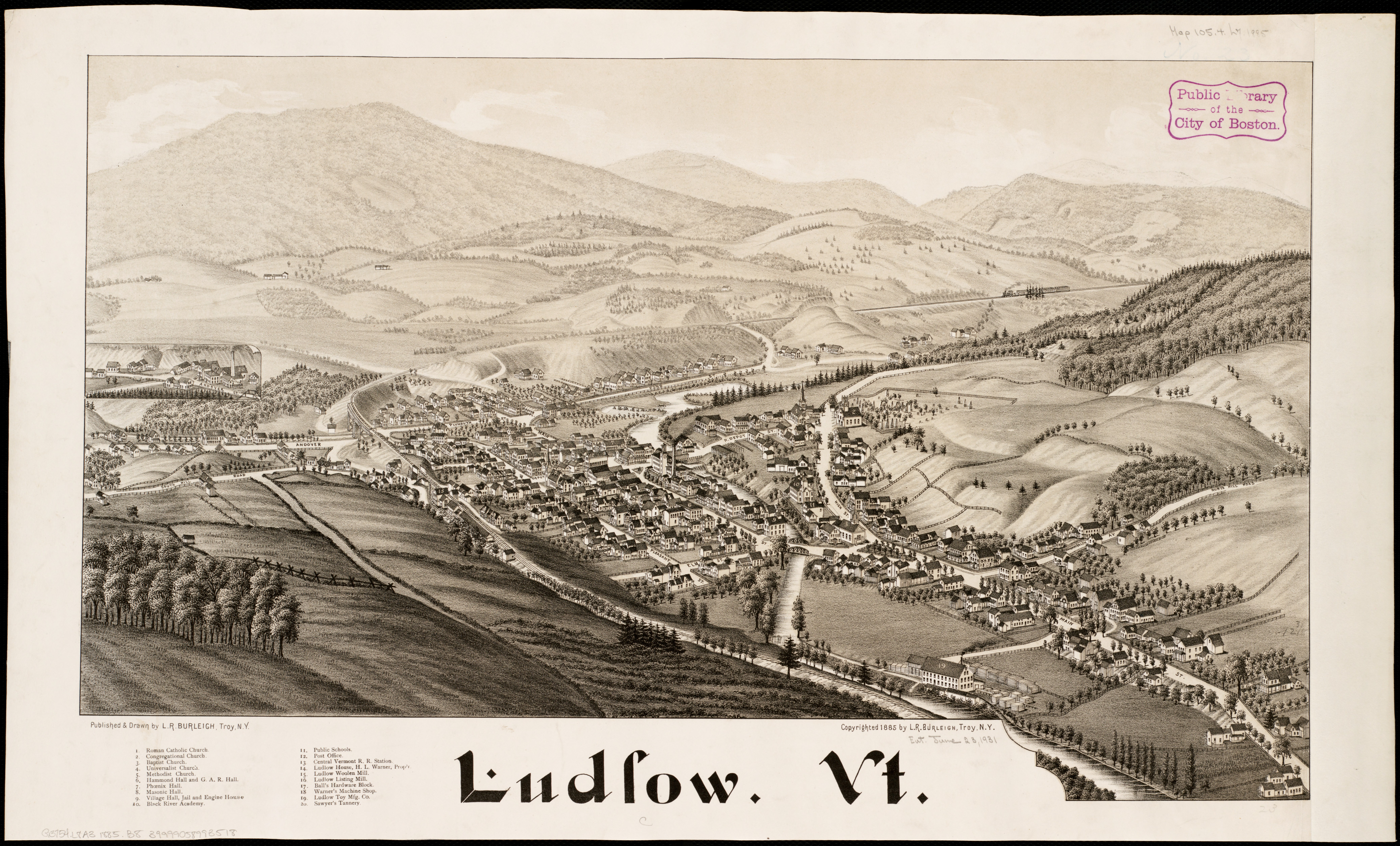
Lithograph of Ludlow from 1885 by L.R. Burleigh with a list of landmarks

Ludlow Woolen Mills is a prominent feature of the village and its history. The mill was first built for woolen manufacture in 1834 and operated until 1837, when the business failed in the economic panic of that year. After sitting vacant for a time, it was sold and had resumed operation by 1853. The mill complex, by then including a machine shop, sawmill, and boardinghouse, changed hands again in 1856 and 1864. The original building, which was five stories tall, burned in 1865 and was rebuilt as the three-story brick building that remains today. By 1885 it was known as the "Ludlow Woolen Company" and included sections for spinning, carding, weaving, dressing, finishing and dyeing wool. In 1899, it employed 130 people and produced 150,000 yards of wool cloth annually. Early in the 20th century the mill took the name "Verd Mont Mills Company", but later it was called the "Gaymont Woolen Mill". General Electric acquired it in 1952 and retained ownership until 1976.

Black River Academy was chartered in Ludlow in 1835 and operated as a school, serving as the Town of Ludlow's public high school until 1938, when a new school was built. The original academy building burned early in the school's history, and the school operated in a church for 44 years until a new school building was built in 1888. Notable alumni of the Black River Academy include U.S. President Calvin Coolidge; Rotary founder Paul P. Harris; John Garibaldi Sargent, who was U.S. Attorney General during Coolidge's presidency; and Vermont governor William W. Stickney. After the school closed, the Richardsonian school building was used for a time and run by Harriet Fife Bostock as a convalescent home. Since 1972 it has housed the Black River Academy Museum and Historical Society, a museum of local history.

Part of the village was listed on the National Register of Historic Places in 2007 as the Ludlow Village Historic District. The district includes 26 contributing properties over an area of 9 acres (36,000 m^{2}). The district is located along a section of Main Street (Vermont Route 103) and Depot Street and includes the former Ludlow Woolen Mills (now housing a condominium and several retail businesses), post office, meeting hall, Black River Academy, fire house, and several churches, businesses, and residences.

== Geography ==
According to the United States Census Bureau, the village has a total area of 1.4 square miles (3.5 km^{2}), all land.

== Demographics ==
Historical population
Census	Pop.	Note	%±
1880	1,179		—
1890	1,081		−8.3%
1900	1,454		34.5%
1910	1,621		11.5%
1920	1,732		6.8%
1930	1,642		−5.2%
1940	1,780		8.4%
1950	1,678		−5.7%
1960	1,658		−1.2%
1970	1,508		−9.0%
1980	1,352		−10.3%
1990	1,123		−16.9%
2000	958		−14.7%
2010	811		−15.3%
2020	773		−4.7%
U.S. Decennial Census

At the census of 2000, there were 958 people, 437 households, and 221 families residing in the village. The population density was 707.2 people per square mile (274.0/km^{2}). There were 731 housing units at an average density of 539.6/sq mi (209.1/km^{2}). The racial makeup of the village was 97.70% White, 0.31% Black or African American, 0.10% Native American, 0.42% Asian, 0.52% from other races, and 0.94% from two or more races. Hispanic or Latino of any race were 0.31% of the population.

There were 437 households, out of which 20.8% had children under the age of 18 living with them, 38.7% were married couples living together, 9.4% had a female householder with no husband present, and 49.4% were non-families. 40.7% of all households were made up of individuals, and 16.9% had someone living alone who was 65 years of age or older. The average household size was 2.06 and the average family size was 2.79.

In the village, the population was spread out, with 19.3% under the age of 18, 6.8% from 18 to 24, 29.4% from 25 to 44, 21.5% from 45 to 64, and 23.0% who were 65 years of age or older. The median age was 42 years. For every 100 females, there were 83.5 males. For every 100 females age 18 and over, there were 82.3 males.

The median income for a household in the village was $29,698, and the median income for a family was $40,703. Males had a median income of $31,250 versus $20,455 for females. The per capita income for the village was $19,824. About 6.7% of families and 9.5% of the population were below the poverty line, including 9.1% of those under age 18 and 7.9% of those age 65 or over.

== Notable people ==
- Paul A. Chase, Associate Justice of the Vermont Supreme Court
- Ida May Fuller, first recipient of a Social Security check
- Joseph F. Radigan, United States Attorney for Vermont
- John G. Sargent, United States Attorney General
- Hiland J. Spaulding, Wisconsin state legislator
- William W. Stickney, Governor of Vermont
- William H. Walker, Associate Justice of the Vermont Supreme Court
- Julius A. Willcox, Associate Justice of the Vermont Supreme Court

== Images ==
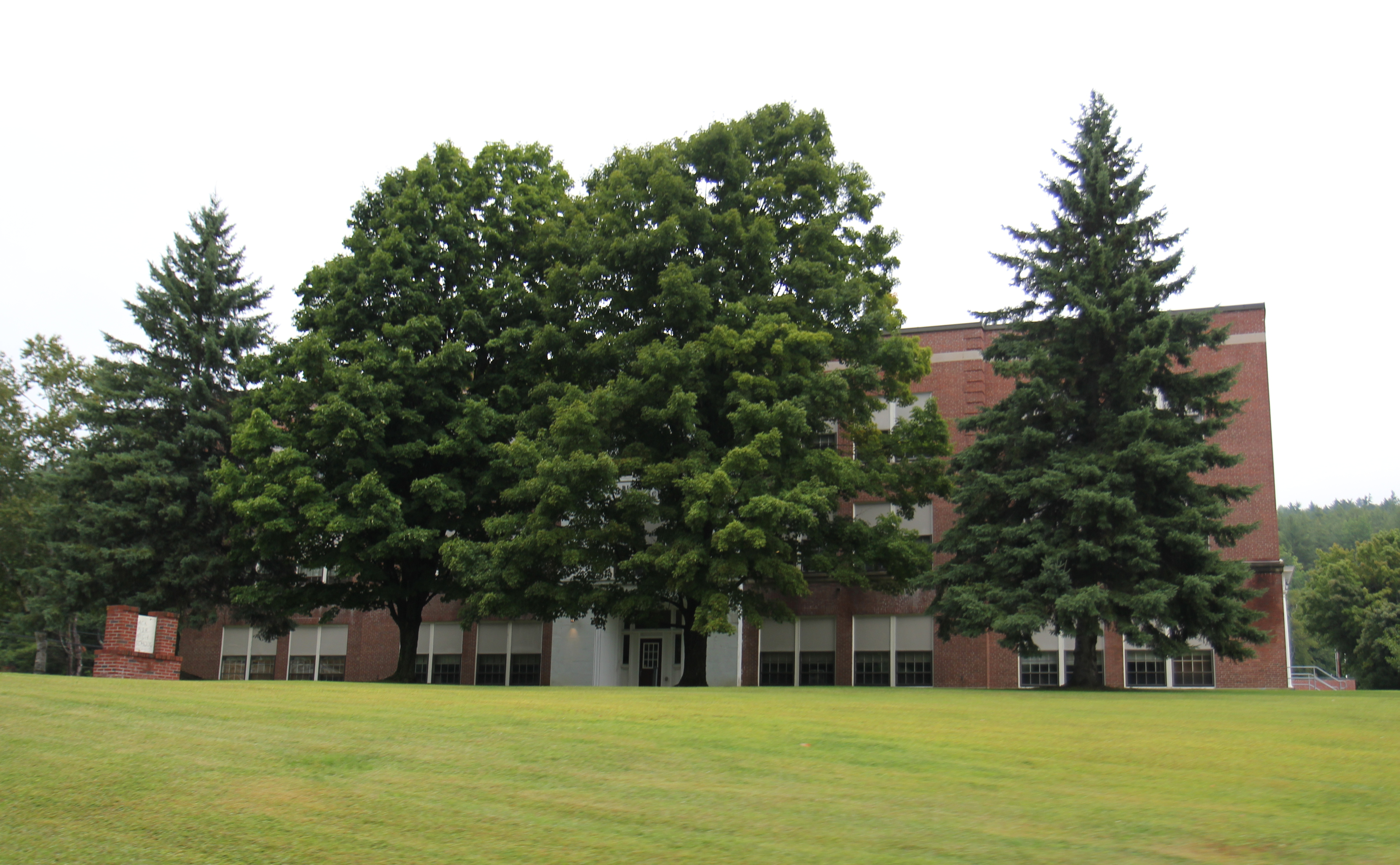
Black River High School in Ludlow

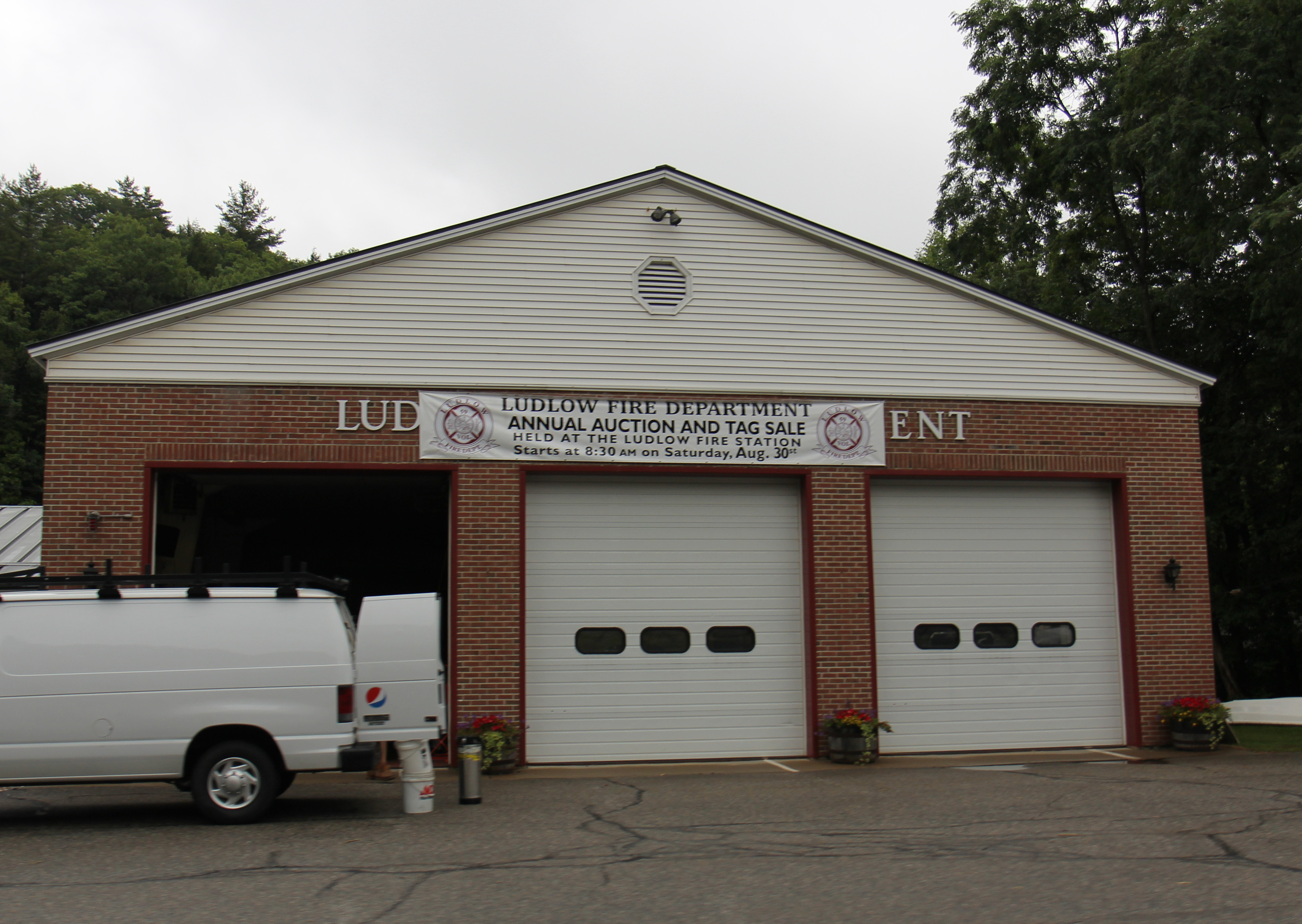
Fire Department
