= Vermont Public Utility Commission =

U.S. state government agency

The Vermont Public Utility Commission (formerly known as the Vermont Public Service Board) is a government agency of the State of Vermont that supervises the rates, quality of service, and overall financial management of public utilities in Vermont. Established under Title 30 of the Vermont Statutes Annotated, the Commission exercises quasi-judicial oversight of electric, natural gas, telecommunications, and private water companies. The commission also serves as the franchising authority for cable television systems in Vermont. In addition, the Commission reviews environmental and economic impacts of proposals to purchase energy supply or build new energy facilities; monitors the safety of hydroelectric dams; evaluates the financial aspects of nuclear plant decommissioning and radioactive waste storage; reviews rates paid to independent power producers; and oversees the statewide Energy Efficiency Utility programs.
The Commission comprises a chairman and two Commissioners, all of whom are nominated by the Vermont Judicial Nominating Board, appointed by the Governor of Vermont and confirmed by the Vermont Senate. The chairman and Commissioners serve staggered six-year terms. The commission's office is located at 112 State Street in Montpelier, Vermont.

The current chairman is Edward McNamara (term expires 2029).
Current Commissioners are Margaret Cheney (term expires 2025) and Riley Allen (term expires 2027).

== New name ==
The Public Service Board name changed in 2017 to the Public Utility Commission effective July 1, 2017. The new name more clearly reflects its existing statutory responsibilities and clarifies the difference between the commission and the separate state agency known as the Vermont Public Service Department.
