= Judiciary of Vermont =

Courts of U.S. state

The Judiciary of Vermont is the state court system of Vermont, charged with Vermont law.

== Vermont Constitution ==
The Vermont courts are established in the Vermont Constitution in sections 28-41 (Judiciary Department). The justices of the Vermont Supreme Court and judges of all lower courts except assistant judges and probate judges serve for six-year terms, which are renewable following a majority retention vote in the Vermont General Assembly.

All Vermont Constitution provides for a mandatory retirement of Supreme Court justices and lower court judges at 90 years of age, as prescribed by law by the General Assembly, or if the General Assembly has not so provided by law at the age of 70 or at the end of the term of election during which they attain the age of 70. The constitution also provides that justices and judges be given a pension as provided by law and that the chief justice "may from time to time appoint retired justices and judges to special assignments as permitted under the rules of the Supreme Court."

== Supreme Court ==
The Vermont Supreme Court is the state supreme court, based in the state capital of Montpelier. Because Vermont has no intermediate appellate courts, it is the sole state appellate court, mainly hearing appeals on questions of law from lower courts, although there are a few instances in which the Court has original jurisdiction. The Supreme Court also is responsible for administration of the Vermont court system; it makes state court procedural rules.

The Supreme Court is established in the Vermont Constitution which provides in section 29 that the court shall consist of a chief justice and four associate justices and in section 30 that:

The Supreme Court shall exercise appellate jurisdiction in all cases, criminal and civil, under such terms and conditions as it shall specify in rules not inconsistent with law. The Supreme Court shall have original jurisdiction only as provided by law, but it shall have the power to issue all writs necessary or appropriate in aid of its appellate jurisdiction. The Supreme Court shall have administrative control of all the courts of the state, and disciplinary authority concerning all judicial officers and attorneys at law in the State.

As of 2023, the chief justice was paid $201,150 and the associate justices were paid $191,977 annually.

== Superior Court ==
The state constitution provides for the creation of lower courts that may have original and appellate jurisdiction and be divided into geographical and functional divisions, "as provided by law or by judicial rules adopted by the Supreme Court not inconsistent with law." The state constitution also provides that state courts may act as both courts of law and courts of equity.

=== History ===
Prior to 2010, the state court system consisted of a number of courts, each exercising jurisdiction in one of the fourteen Vermont counties.

- Superior Courts: exercised exclusive jurisdiction over most civil cases, including torts and lawsuits over small claims of $5000 or less. Superior courts also reviewed decisions of lower courts and appeals to administrative agency decisions. Three judges, a presiding judge and two assistant judges sat on each Superior Court. The assistant judges (or side judges) are elected county officials, who sat with the judge in certain cases and are responsible for non-judicial county affairs as well, an unusual system unique to Vermont.
- District Courts: heard almost all criminal cases and a few civil cases, including civil suspension of driver's licenses and fish and wildlife, traffic ticket, and municipal ordinance violations. There were seventeen District Court judges: one in each county except for Chittenden County (the most populous in the state), which had six.
- Family Courts: heard family law matters, including marriage (divorce, annulment, desertion, and separation); child support; parentage; domestic violence and orders of protection for domestic abuse victims; juveniles (delinquency, abuse and neglect) and commitments to the Vermont State Hospital, the state psychiatric hospital.

In 2010 the court system was integrated. The criminal, civil, family and environmental courts became part of a new Superior Court. The Probate Court was merged with the family court in February 2011 and all applicable county employees became state employees.

=== Present Superior Court ===
The Superior Court is the current statewide trial level court of Vermont and consists of forty judges. It sits in each of the fourteen counties and consists of five divisions. The civil, criminal, family, and probate divisions sit in each county, while the environmental division exercises statewide jurisdiction. The Chief Judge of the Superior Court is responsible for assigning judges to sit in specific divisions and counties, usually for a period of one year beginning in September. In larger jurisdictions, such as Chittenden County, judges may hear cases in only one division, while judges assigned to smaller counties may sit in multiple divisions. Judges are not required to reside in the county that they sit in and many commute to their assigned courthouse from their hometowns.

=== Environmental Division ===
The Environmental Division is a specialized court dealing with environmental law. The Court hears appeals from municipal boards and commissions and appeals from Act 250 decisions as well as cases from the Agency of Natural Resources, Natural Resource Board, and municipal enforcement. There are two Environmental Court judges on the court, which hear cases from across the state.

=== Current Superior Court Judges ===
As of November 2025
Name	Date of Appointment	Term Ends	Appointed by:	Law School
Thomas Zonay	2007-03-01 2021 (as Chief Judge)	2031	Douglas	Vermont
Cortland Corsones	2007-03-01	2029	Douglas	Cornell
Timothy Tomasi	2010-12-30	2031	Douglas	Columbia
Alison Arms	2011-08-18	2029	Shumlin	Denver
Thomas Walsh	2011-12-12 (Environmental Division)	2032	Shumlin	Vermont
Kevin Griffin	2013-01-04	2031	Shumlin	New England Law
John Valente	2015-09-04	2032	Shumlin	Suffolk
Kristen Schoonover	2015-09-10	2029	Shumlin	San Francisco
Michael Kainen	2016-01-12	2029	Shumlin	Vermont
Mary Morrissey	2016-02-05	2029	Shumlin	New Hampshire
Michael Harris	2016-03-11	2032	Shumlin	Wisconsin
John Pacht	2016-04-01	2028	Shumlin	Hofstra
David Fenster	2016-12-28	2028	Shumlin	Yeshiva
Elizabeth Mann	2016-12-28	2031	Shumlin	Vermont
John Treadwell	2017-11-11	2030	Scott	Wisconsin
David Barra	2018-02-21	2032	Scott	Georgetown
Megan Shafritz	2018-03-21	2031	Scott	Pennsylvania
Vacant		2030		
Kerry McDonald-Cady	2019-10-30	2028	Scott	Vermont
Howard Kalfus	2021-06-23	2031	Scott	Suffolk
Heather Gray	2022-01-03	2027	Scott	None/Clerkship
Elizabeth Novotny	2022-01-03	2027	Scott	Suffolk
Justin Jiron	2022-01-03	2029	Scott	Albany
Daniel Richardson	2022-04-26	2027	Scott	Vermont
Jennifer Barrett	2022-09-23	2027	Scott	New Hampshire
Robert Katims	2023-04-14	2028	Scott	Vermont
Vacant		2031		
Rory Thibault	2023-06-09	2029	Scott	Vermont
Alexander Burke	2023-11-17	2029	Scott	American
Susan McManus	2023-11-17	2029	Scott	Vermont
Benjamin Battles	2023-12-12	2032	Scott	Brooklyn
Rachel Malone	2023-12-12	2032	Scott	Georgetown
Navah Spero	2023-12-21	2029	Scott	George Washington
Kate Gallagher	2024-03-01	2029	Scott	George Washington
Joseph McLean	2024-07-29 (Environmental Division)	2028	Scott	Vermont
Laura Rowntree	2024-12-20	2028	Scott	Fordham
Dana DiSano	2024-12-20	2030	Scott	Florida
Bonnie Badgewick	2025-01-06	2030	Scott	Suffolk
Timothy Doherty	2025-01-07	2030	Scott	Yale
Colin Owyang	2025-10-06	2031	Scott	Michigan

==== Vacancies and Pending Nominations ====
Vacator	Date of Appointment	Reason	Vacancy Date	Next Retention	Nominee	Nomination Date	Nominee Law School
H. Dickson Corbett	2023-04-14	Death	2026-07-02	2031			
Lisa Warren	2019-10-25	Retirement	2026-09-01	2030			

=== Probate courts ===
Probate Courts deal with probate, wills and testamentary trusts, adoptions, guardianship, emancipation of minors, uniform gifts to minors, and name changes. There are 18 Probate Court judges, elected for four-year terms; Probate Court judges need not be attorneys. The clerk of the probate court is appointed. A typical salary for the judge is $51,542.40. A typical salary for the clerk is $30,721.60.

== Vermont Judicial Bureau ==
The Vermont Judicial Bureau is a specialized court with subject matter jurisdiction over civil violations of Vermont law and municipal ordinances. The Judicial Bureau operates under the supervision of the Vermont Supreme Court. Appeals from the Judicial Bureau are heard by the Criminal Division of the Vermont Superior Court. Appeals filed by the State are heard on the record. Appeals filed by a defendant may be on the record, de novo by judge, or de novo by jury at the option of the defendant. The Judicial Bureau operates under the Vermont Rules of Civil Procedure, in particular V.R.C.P. 80.6.

Civil violations include an array of decriminalized conduct involving operation of motor vehicles (traffic), hunting/fishing/trapping, possession of alcohol/tobacco/marijuana, hazing, lead paint abatement, unreasonable noise, animal cruelty, etc. Police officers, municipal officials designated by the legislative body of a municipality, county state's attorneys, the state attorney general, and certain other state executive branch officials have authority to prosecute civil violations. Defendants typically conduct their own defense, but may hire attorney at their own expense.

Pre-trial motions and discovery are not allowed, unless permission has been granted by a judicial officer. At the merits hearing, both parties may call witnesses and offer exhibits. Witnesses may be compelled to appear by subpoena. The burden of proof is on the State or municipality to prove the alleged violation by clear and convincing evidence, meaning the truth of the facts asserted is highly probable. This burden is higher than the ordinary civil burden of proof by a preponderance of the evidence, but lower than the criminal burden of proof beyond a reasonable doubt. If the State or municipality meets its burden of proof, the assessed penalties may include a fine, demerit points or suspension of a driver license or fish & wildlife license, and community service.

Merits hearings and motion hearings are conducted throughout the State by various judicial officers, including a statewide Chief Hearing Officer, a statewide Hearing Officer, and several county Assistant Judges. Contempt hearings are conducted by Hearing Officers. Hearing Officers also sit in the Vermont Superior Court by special assignment. Hearing Officers are members of the Vermont Bar appointed by the Chief Superior Court Judge. Assistant Judges are citizens elected in their respective county of residence. The Judicial Bureau has one Clerk. The Clerk supervises the Court Operations Manager and a statewide administrative staff at the courthouse in White River Junction.

== Budget ==
The judiciary system budget was approximately $78.5 million in 2026.

== See also ==
- Government of Vermont
- Impeachment in Vermont
