= Vermont Bar Association =

U.S. state voluntary bar association

- Formation: September 1878; 148 years ago
- Type: Legal Society
- Headquarters: Montpelier, Vermont
- Location: United States
- Website: http://www.vtbar.org

The Vermont Bar Association (VBA) is a voluntary bar association for the state of Vermont.

== History ==
Founded in September 1878 in Montpelier, the Vermont Bar Association remains the only professional organization for lawyers, judges, paralegals and law students in Vermont.

== Presidents ==
The first president of the Vermont Bar Association was Edward J. Phelps. Past presidents of the Vermont Bar Association include prominent judges, political leaders, military leaders and diplomats. The presidents of the Vermont Bar Association have included:

- 1878 Edward John Phelps
- 1879 Luke P. Poland
- 1880 Walter C. Dunton
- 1881 Daniel Roberts
- 1882 James Barrett
- 1883 Benjamin F. Fifield
- 1884 Aldace F. Walker
- 1885 George N. Dale
- 1886 Charles H. Heath
- 1887 Roswell Farnham
- 1888 Philip K. Gleed
- 1889 Laforrest H. Thompson
- 1890 Henry R. Start
- 1891 Joel C. Baker
- 1892 Levant M. Read
- 1893 Charles M. Wilds
- 1894 William B. C. Stickney
- 1895 Charles A. Prouty
- 1896 Eleazer L. Waterman
- 1897 Charles P. Hogan
- 1898 Wendell P. Stafford
- 1899 Charles Hial Darling
- 1900 Jonathan Ross
- 1901 John Young
- 1902 John H. Senter
- 1903 Wilder L. Burnap
- 1904 William W. Stickney
- 1905 H. Henry Powers
- 1906 Fred M. Butler
- 1907 Alexander Dunnett
- 1908 James K. Batchelder
- 1909 Chauncey G. Austin
- 1910 James Manning Tyler
- 1911 Rufus E. Brown
- 1912 Clarke C. Fitts
- 1913–1914 John W. Rowell
- 1915 Charles D. Watson
- 1916 John W. Gordon
- 1917 George B. Young
- 1918 Robert E. Healy
- 1919 John G. Sargent
- 1920 Marvelle C. Webber
- 1921 John W. Redmond
- 1922 Edwin W. Lawrence
- 1923 Warren R. Austin
- 1924 Stanley C. Wilson
- 1925 J. Rolf Searles
- 1926 S. Hollister Jackson
- 1927 James K. Batchelder (acting)
- 1927 Walter S. Fenton
- 1928 George M. Hogan
- 1929 Homer L. Skeels
- 1930 Bert L. Stafford
- 1930 George L. Hunt
- 1931 Guy M. Page
- 1932 Walter H. Cleary
- 1933 Fred E. Gleason
- 1934 Collins M. Graves
- 1935 J. Ward Carver
- 1936 Charles F. Black
- 1937 Arthur L. Graves
- 1938 James Patrick Leamy
- 1939 Neil D. Clawson
- 1940 Sherman R. Moulton
- 1940 Horace H. Powers
- 1941 Joseph A. McNamara
- 1942 Deane C. Davis
- 1943 Frank E. Barber
- 1944 A. Pearley Feen
- 1945 Leonard F. Wing
- 1945 Paul A. Chase
- 1946 Harold C. Sylvester
- 1947 Harold I. O’Brien
- 1948–1949 Osmer C. Fitts
- 1949–1950 Norton Barber
- 1951–1952 William H. Edmunds
- 1952–1953 F. Ray Keyser Sr.
- 1954–1955 William H. Adams
- 1955–1956 R. Clarke Smith
- 1956–1957 Henry F. Black
- 1957–1958 Sterry R. Waterman
- 1959–1960 Clifton G. Parker
- 1960–1961 A. Luke Crispe
- 1962–1963 J. Boone Wilson
- 1963–1964 Christopher A. Webber
- 1966–1967 Louis G. Whitcomb
- 1967–1968 Hilton A. Wick
- 1968–1969 J. Malcolm Williams
- 1969–1970 Robert K. Bing
- 1970–1971 John D. Carbine
- 1971–1972 James L. Oakes
- 1972–1973 Ralph A. Foote
- 1973–1974 Peter P. Plante
- 1974–1975 John H. Downs
- 1975–1976 James S. Brock
- 1976–1977 Clarke A. Gravel
- 1977–1978 James T. Haugh
- 1978–1979 John M. Dinse
- 1979–1980 Chester S. Ketcham
- 1980–1981 Harvey B. Otterman Jr.
- 1981–1982 Wynn Underwood
- 1982–1983 Donald H. Hackel
- 1983–1984 Joseph E. Frank
- 1984–1985 Leonard F. Wing Jr.
- 1985–1986 John G. Kristensen
- 1986–1987 John B. Webber
- 1987–1988 Ellen Mercer Fallon
- 1988–1989 John A. Dooley
- 1989–1990 Douglas Richards
- 1990–1991 Edwin H. Amidon Jr.
- 1991–1992 Ellen Holmes Maloney
- 1992–1993 Michael B. Clapp
- 1993–1994 William J. Reedy
- 1994–1995 Jan S. Eastman
- 1995–1996 Peter W. Hall
- 1996–1997 Joan Loring Wing
- 1997–1998 Wendy Morgan
- 1998–1999 Emily S. Davis
- 1999–2000 Jon R. Eggleston
- 2000–2001 Dorothy Helling
- 2001–2002 Matthew Valerio
- 2002–2003 Donald Rendall Jr.
- 2003–2004 Anna Saxman
- 2004–2005 Thomas Zonay
- 2005–2006 James Gallagher
- 2006–2007 Samuel Hoar Jr.
- 2007–2008 S. Stacy Chapman III
- 2008–2009 Douglas L. Molde
- 2009–2010 Eileen M. Blackwood
- 2010–2011 Therese M. Corsones
- 2011–2012 James F. Carroll
- 2012–2013 Amber L. Barber
- 2013–2014 David R. Fenster
- 2014–2015 Daniel P. Richardson
- 2015–2016 Jennifer R. Emens-Butler
- 2016–2017 Michael E. Kennedy
- 2018–2019 Gary L. Franklin
- 2019–2020 Elizabeth F. Novotny
- 2020–2021 Elizabeth A. Kruska
- 2021–2022 Robert E. Fletcher
- 2022–2023 Andrew Manitsky
- 2023–2024 Judith L. Dillon
- 2024–2026 Joshua R. Diamond
- 2026–Present Jordana M. Levine
