= Willard W. Miles =

American judge (1845–1926)

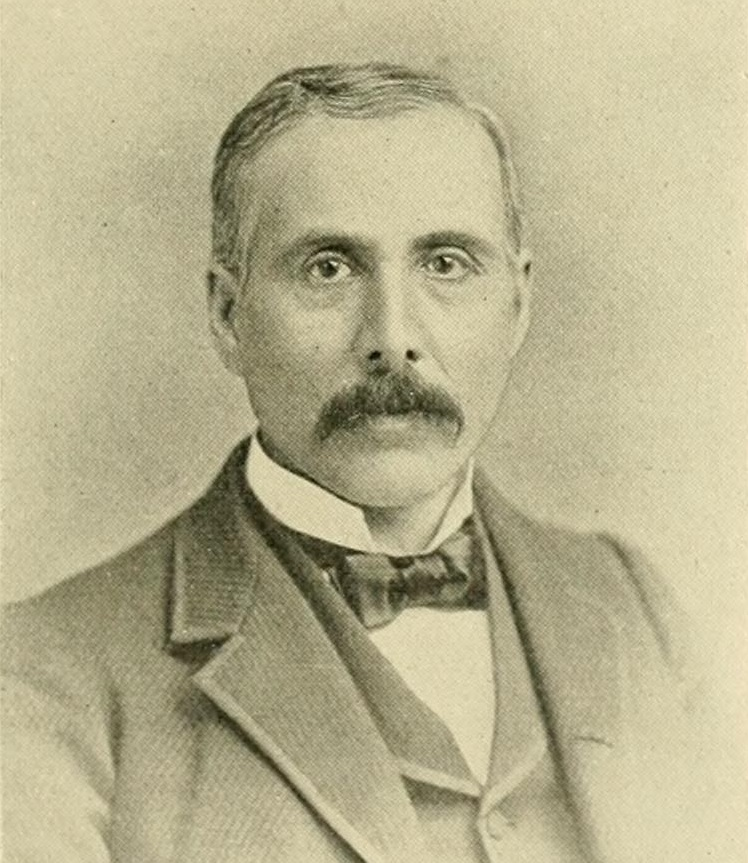
- From 1894's Men of Vermont Illustrated

Associate Justice of the Vermont Supreme Court
- In office 1917–1923
- Preceded by: John H. Watson
- Succeeded by: Fred M. Butler
- In office 1905–1906
- Preceded by: Henry R. Start
- Succeeded by: None (position eliminated)

Chief Judge of the Vermont Superior Court
- In office 1909–1917
- Preceded by: George M. Powers
- Succeeded by: Eleazer L. Waterman

Judge of the Vermont Superior Court
- In office 1906–1917
- Preceded by: None (position created)
- Succeeded by: Stanley C. Wilson

Member of the Vermont Senate
- In office 1894–1896 Serving with Charles L. Erwin
- Preceded by: Josiah Grout, Amory Davison
- Succeeded by: Joseph B. Holton, William E. Curtis
- Constituency: Orleans County

State's Attorney of Orleans County, Vermont
- In office 1890–1894
- Preceded by: Frank E. Alfred
- Succeeded by: Orien S. Annis

Member of the Vermont House of Representatives
- In office 1904–1904
- Preceded by: Harley T. Seaver
- Succeeded by: James E. Turnbull
- Constituency: Barton
- In office 1878–1880
- Preceded by: Charles C. Hoyt
- Succeeded by: Richard B. Skinner
- Constituency: Craftsbury
- In office 1872–1874
- Preceded by: Enoch Rowell
- Succeeded by: John F. Tenney
- Constituency: Albany

Personal details
- Born: February 6, 1845 Albany, Vermont, U.S.
- Died: May 13, 1926 (aged 81) Barton, Vermont, U.S.
- Resting place: Welcome O. Brown Cemetery, Barton, Vermont, U.S.
- Party: Republican
- Spouse: Ellen M. Dow (m. 1872)
- Relations: Frank D. Thompson (son in law)
- Children: 4
- Profession: Attorney

Willard W. Miles (February 6, 1845 – May 13, 1926) was a Vermont attorney and judge. He was most notable for his service as an associate justice of the Vermont Supreme Court from 1905 to 1906, and again from 1917 to 1923.

== Early life ==
Willard Wesbery Miles was born in Albany, Vermont on February 6, 1845, the son of Orin and Eunice (Clark) Miles. He was educated in Albany, and attended academies in Barnston and Hatley, Quebec.

== Start of career ==
Miles taught school in Albany and Craftsbury, and studied law with attorneys Charles I. Vail and William W. Grout. He was admitted to the bar in 1872, and practiced in Albany and Craftsbury. A Republican, he held local office in both towns, including serving as school superintendent in Albany in 1867 and Craftsbury in 1876, and Craftsbury Town Clerk from 1875 to 1881. From 1872 to 1874 he represented Albany in the Vermont House of Representatives, and he represented Craftsbury in the Vermont House from 1878 to 1880.

In 1881, he moved to Barton, where he practiced law in partnership with Grout. When Grout retired in 1888 in order to devote full time to his duties as a member of the United States House of Representatives, Miles continued the practice on his own.

From 1890 to 1894, Miles served as State's Attorney of Orleans County, and from 1894 to 1896 he represented Orleans County in the Vermont Senate.

In 1904, Miles was elected to represent Barton in the Vermont House; when Clarke C. Fitts resigned as a Representative to become Vermont Attorney General, Miles took his place as chairman of the House Judiciary Committee.

== Career as a judge ==
Miles served in the Vermont House until 1905, when he was appointed as an associate justice of the Vermont Supreme Court. He served until 1906, when a newly–enacted law reduced the size of the court and eliminated his seat.

When his position on the Supreme Court was eliminated, Miles was appointed a judge of the Vermont Superior Court. He served in this position until 1917, when he was again appointed to the state Supreme Court. He served as an associate justice until 1923, when he retired. He was succeeded on the court by Fred M. Butler.

== Retirement and death ==
In retirement, Miles continued to reside in Barton. He died there on May 13, 1926, and was buried at Welcome O. Brown Cemetery in Barton.

== Family ==
In 1872, Miles married Ellen M. Dow. They were the parents of daughters Ida M. (1873–1969), Mabel A. (1875–1940), and Dorothy E. (1895–1895), and son Orin L. (1879–1888).

Mabel Augusta Miles was the wife of Frank D. Thompson (1876–1940), who served as an associate justice of the Vermont Supreme Court. Thompson was the son of Laforrest H. Thompson, who also served on the state Supreme Court.

== Sources ==
=== Books ===
- Baldwin, Frederick W. (1886). Biography of the Bar of Orleans County, Vermont. Montpelier, VT: Vermont Watchman and State Journal Press. p. 263.
- Carleton, Hiram (1903). Genealogical and Family History of the State of Vermont. New York, NY: Lewis Publishing Company. ISBN 9780806347943.
- Dodge, Prentiss Cutler (1912). Encyclopedia of Vermont Biography. Burlington, VT: Ullery Publishing Company. p. 88.

=== Magazines ===
- Forbes, Charles S. (January 1906). "Judge W. W. Miles". The Vermonter. White River Junction, VT: Charles R. Cummings.
- "Death Notice, Frank Dutton Thompson" (PDF). The Scroll of Phi Delta Theta. Menasha, WI: Phi Delta Theta Fraternity. September 1940.

=== Newspapers ===
- "W. W. Miles Made Judge". Burlington Free Press. Burlington, VT. November 30, 1905 – via Newspapers.com.
- "Judge Hall Coming Here". Bennington Banner. Bennington, VT. November 27, 1906 – via Newspapers.com.
- "John H. Watson Is New Chief Justice". Bennington Banner. Bennington, VT. January 19, 1917 – via Newspapers.com.
- "Judge Butler Is Elected To Supreme Bench". Burlington Free Press. Burlington, VT. January 23, 1923 – via Newspapers.com.

=== Internet ===
- Boyko, Janice (2007). "Welcome O. Brown Cemetery, Barton, Orleans Co., Vermont". Vermont Northeast Kingdom Genealogy. Simsbury, CT: Januce Boyko.
- Buckley, Cornelius (Town Clerk) (May 13, 1926). "Vermont Death Records 1909-2008, Entry for Willard W. Miles". Ancestry.com. Provo, UT: Ancestry.com, LLC.

Political offices
Preceded by Henry R. Start	Associate Justice of the Vermont Supreme Court; 1905–1906	Succeeded by None (position eliminated)
Preceded by John H. Watson	Associate Justice of the Vermont Supreme Court; 1917–1923	Succeeded by Fred M. Butler
