= Stephen Cushing =

Stephen Cushing may refer to:

- Stephen B. Cushing (1812–1868), American lawyer and politician.
- Stephen S. Cushing (1884–1957), Vermont attorney, businessman, judge, and politician
