= Fred M. Butler =

American judge (1854–1932)

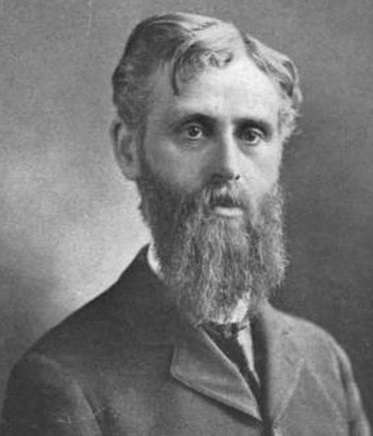
- From 1899's Book of Biographies of Rutland County, Vermont

Associate Justice of the Vermont Supreme Court
- In office 1923–1926
- Preceded by: Willard W. Miles
- Succeeded by: Sherman R. Moulton

Chief Judge of the Vermont Superior Court
- In office 1921–1923
- Preceded by: Zed S. Stanton
- Succeeded by: George M. Powers

Judge of the Vermont Superior Court
- In office 1909–1923
- Preceded by: George M. Powers
- Succeeded by: Frank D. Thompson

Member of the Vermont Senate
- In office 1908–1909 Serving with Walter F. Scott, Eugene McIntyre, William Franklin Walker
- Preceded by: Henry Otis Carpenter, Dan Demin Burditt, John Emory Buxton, William H. Rowland
- Succeeded by: Henry B. Barden, Henry L. Clark, Samuel R. Hitchcock, Egbert Clayton Tuttle
- Constituency: Rutland County

President of the Vermont Bar Association
- In office 1906–1907
- Preceded by: H. Henry Powers
- Succeeded by: Alexander Dunnett

Personal details
- Born: May 28, 1854 Jamaica, Vermont, U.S.
- Died: December 24, 1932 (aged 78) Rutland, Vermont, U.S.
- Resting place: Evergreen Cemetery, Rutland, Vermont, U.S.
- Party: Republican
- Spouse: Lillian Harriet Holton (m.
- Children: 5
- Profession: Attorney

Fred M. Butler (May 28, 1854 – December 24, 1932) was a Vermont attorney and judge. He is notable for his service as an associate justice of the Vermont Supreme Court from 1923 to 1926.

== Early life ==
Fred Mason Butler was born in Jamaica, Vermont on May 28, 1854, the son of Aaron Mason Butler (1815–1886) and Emeline (Muzzy) Butler (d. 1877). He was educated in the public schools of Jamaica, and graduated from Leland and Gray Seminary in Townshend.

Butler had started his legal studies in the Jamaica office of Jonathan G. Eddy while still at Leland & Gray. After graduation, he continued studying law under his uncle in the same Jamaica office that included Hoyt Henry Wheeler and Eleazer L. Waterman. He was admitted to the bar in 1877, after which he moved to Rutland.

== Start of career ==
Butler established a law practice in Rutland, first in partnership with Joel C. Baker, then with Lyman W. Redington, and finally with Thomas W. Moloney. From 1906 to 1907, Butler was president of the Vermont Bar Association, and he was succeeded by Alexander Dunnett. He was also involved in several businesses; he was a member of the board of directors of the Baxter National Bank and Rutland Railway Light & Power Company, and was an original incorporator of the State Mutual Fire Insurance Company.

Active in politics and government as a Republican, Butler served as a delegate to numerous city, county, and state party conventions. He also served in local office including grand juror (1882–84), city attorney (1884-89), and judge of the Rutland city court (1889–95). In 1908 he was elected to the Vermont Senate.

Butler was an active leader of the Baptist church. He was a member of First Baptist Church in Rutland, and served as president of the state Baptist convention from 1909 to 1910.

== Judicial career ==
In 1908, the Vermont General Assembly enacted a law expanding the Vermont Supreme Court from four justices to five. The appointment as an associate justice went to George M. Powers, who was serving as a judge of the Vermont Superior Court, and had been an associate justice prior to the passage of a previous law reducing the size of the state Supreme Court. Butler was selected for the resulting vacancy on the Vermont Superior Court, and resigned from the State Senate in January 1909 in order to accept. He continued to serve on this court until 1923. From 1921 to 1923, Butler served as chief judge, having succeeded Zed S. Stanton.

In 1923, associate justice Willard W. Miles retired from the state Supreme Court. Butler was appointed to fill the vacancy, and he served until 1926, when he retired. He was succeeded by Sherman R. Moulton.

== Retirement and death ==
Butler died in Rutland on December 24, 1932. He was buried at Evergreen Cemetery in Rutland.

== Family ==
In 1875, Butler married Lillian Harriet Holton (1852-1935), a resident of Bangor, New York. They were the parents of three daughters: Anza Lillian (1876-1933) was the wife of Wallace W. Nichols of Rutland; Helen Maria (1885-1981), the wife of John A. Barney of Rutland; and Florence Muzzy (1892-1973), the wife of Leon E. Ellsworth of Enosburg Falls and Roy S. Woodward of Waterville. A son was born in 1879 and died in 1880. Another son, Aaron Mason Butler, was born and died in 1891.

Butler's siblings included Edgar M. Butler (1857-1928), who served as a member of the Vermont Senate.

== Sources ==
=== Newspapers ===
- "Rutland Matters: Fred M. Butler". Burlington Free Press. Burlington, VT. May 4, 1891 – via Newspapers.com.
- "Demise of Alexander Dunnett". The Evening Argus. Montpelier, VT. September 15, 1920. p. 4 – via Newspapers.com.
- "Butler Elected Judge on the 15th Ballot". Spirit of the Age. Woodstock, VT. January 30, 1909 – via Newspapers.com.
- "Five Ballots on Sheriff". Burlington Free Press. Burlington, VT. July 6, 1910 – via Newspapers.com.
- "Julius Willcox Appointed Judge". St. Johnsbury Republican. St. Johnsbury, VT. August 27, 1921 – via Newspapers.com.
- Vermont Press Bureau (January 23, 1923). "Judge Butler is Elected to Supreme Bench". Burlington Free Press. Burlington, VT – via Newspapers.com.
- "Judge Butler to Leave Bench". Burlington Free Press. Burlington, VT. October 20, 1926 – via Newspapers.com.
- "Moulton Now on Supreme Bench". Burlington Free Press. Burlington, VT. October 22, 1926 – via Newspapers.com.
- "Judge Fred M. Butler of Rutland Dies After Long Legal Career". Burlington Free Press. Burlington, VT. December 27, 1932 – via Newspapers.com.
- "Judge Butler Buried". Springfield Republican. Springfield, MA. Associated Press. December 29, 1932 – via GenealogyBank.com.

=== Books ===
- Carleton, Hiram (1903). Genealogical and Family History of the State of Vermont. Vol. II. New York, NY: Lewis Historical Publishing Company.
- Cutter, William Richard (1913). New England Families, Genealogical and Memorial. Vol. 2. New York, NY: Lewis Historical Publishing Company.
- Dodge, Prentiss Cutler (1912). Encyclopedia of Vermont Biography. Burlington, VT: Ullery Publishing Company. p. 90.
- Vermont General Assembly (1898). Acts and Resolves Passed by the General Assembly of the State of Vermont. Burlington, VT: Free Press Publishing.
- Vermont General Assembly (1908). Journal of the Senate of the State of Vermont. St. Albans, VT: St. Albans Messenger Company.

=== Internet ===
- Howard, Luke (Jamaica, Vermont Town Clerk (November 24, 1875). "Vermont Vital Records, 1720-1908, Marriage Record for Fred M. Butler and Lillian H. Holton". Ancestry.com. Provo, UT: Ancestry.com LLC.
- Brown, I. M.(Rutland, Vermont Town Clerk (February 9, 1880). "Vermont Vital Records, 1720-1908, Death Record for Unnamed Son of Fred M. Butler and Lillian H. Holton". Ancestry.com. Provo, UT: Ancestry.com LLC.
- Whittier, H. B. (Rutland, Vermont City Clerk) (April 15, 1908). "Vermont Vital Records, 1909-2008, Marriage Record for Helen Maria Butler and John Amherst Barney". Ancestry.com. Provo, UT: Ancestry.com LLC.
- Smith, Elsie C. (Cambridge, Vermont Town Clerk) (September 16, 1917). "Vermont Vital Records, 1909-2008, Marriage Record for Florence Muzzy Butler and Leon Edgar Ellsworth". Ancestry.com. Provo, UT: Ancestry.com LLC.
- Crowther, Nita S. (Rutland, Vermont Assistant City Clerk) (January 1, 1933). "Vermont Death Records, 1909-2008, Entry for Fred Mason Butler". Ancestry.com. Provo, UT: Ancestry.com LLC.
- Eastman, Thelma W. (Rutland, Vermont Assistant City Clerk) (September 1, 1933). "Vermont Death Records, 1909-2008, Entry for Mrs. Anza Nichols". Ancestry.com. Provo, UT: Ancestry.com LLC.
- Eastman, Thelma W. (Rutland, Vermont Assistant City Clerk) (September 1, 1935). "Vermont Death Records, 1909-2008, Entry for Lillian Harriet Holton Butler". Ancestry.com. Provo, UT: Ancestry.com LLC.
- Mander, Sydney C. (Morristown, Vermont Town Clerk) (December 31, 1973). "Vermont Death Records, 1909-2008, Entry for Florence E. Woodward". Ancestry.com. Provo, UT: Ancestry.com LLC.
- Hackett, Mary E. (Rutland, Vermont Assistant City Clerk) (January 28, 1981). "Vermont Death Records, 1909-2008, Entry for Helen Maria Butler Barney". Ancestry.com. Provo, UT: Ancestry.com LLC.
- "Past Presidents of the Vermont Bar Association" (PDF). Vtbar.org. Montpelier, VT: Vermont Bar Association. 2013.

Political offices
Preceded by Willard W. Miles	Justice of the Vermont Supreme Court; 1923–1926	Succeeded by Sherman R. Moulton
