= Clarke C. Fitts =

American politician

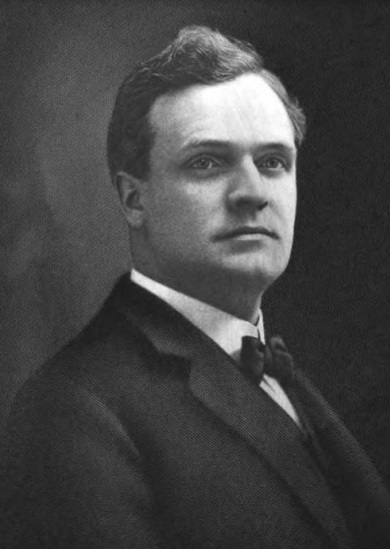

3rd Vermont Attorney General
- In office 1904–1908
- Governor: Charles J. Bell (1904–1906); Fletcher D. Proctor (1906–1908)
- Preceded by: Daniel Buck (1795); None (office abolished 1797–1904)
- Succeeded by: John G. Sargent

Member of the Vermont House of Representatives from Brattleboro
- In office 1904–1904
- Preceded by: James Conland
- Succeeded by: Ernest Willard Gibson

State's Attorney of Windham County, Vermont
- In office 1894–1896
- Preceded by: Zina H. Allbee
- Succeeded by: Charles Henry Robb

Personal details
- Born: October 17, 1870 Wardsboro, Vermont, U.S.
- Died: December 20, 1916 (aged 46) Watertown, Massachusetts, U.S.
- Resting place: Morningside Cemetery, Brattleboro, Vermont, U.S.
- Party: Republican
- Spouse(s): Harriet Lyon (m. 1893; died 1897) Maud Emerson (m. 1903)
- Children: 4
- Profession: Attorney

Clarke Cushing Fitts (October 17, 1870 – December 20, 1916) was an American attorney and businessman. He served as the first Vermont Attorney General following the reestablishment of the office in 1904.

== Early life ==
Clarke Cushing Fitts was born in Wardsboro, Vermont on October 17, 1870. He attended Leland and Gray Seminary and graduated from Brattleboro High School in 1886. He studied law at the Brattleboro firm of Waterman, Martin and Hitt, and was admitted to the bar in 1891, a few days after his twenty-first birthday.

== Career ==
A Republican, Fitts served as State's Attorney of Windham County from 1894 to 1896. In 1901 he was offered appointment to a federal judgeship in Nome, Alaska, but he declined.

In the early 1900s Fitts served on the Vermont Library Commission, including service as the commission's Chairman.

In 1904 the Vermont General Assembly passed a bill to reestablish the office of Attorney General, which had been abolished in 1797. Fitts, then a member of the Vermont House of Representatives and chairman of its Judiciary Committee, won the legislative election to the office. He was reelected by popular vote in 1906, and served From October, 1904 to October, 1908.

Fitts was President of the Vermont Bar Association in 1912 and 1913, and also served as a Vice President of the American Bar Association.

In addition to his legal practice, Fitts was involved in several businesses, and was a director of the National Life Insurance Company, Connecticut River Power Company, People's National Bank, Brattleboro Savings Bank, New England Power Company, and Hooker, Corser and Mitchell, a manufacturer of heavy duty work clothing and children's play clothes.

== Death and burial ==
Fitts died at the home of relatives in Watertown, Massachusetts on December 20, 1916, following an illness and unsuccessful surgery. He was entombed in a mausoleum at Brattleboro's Morningside Cemetery.

== Family ==
Fitts was married twice. In 1893 he married Harriet Lyon of Londonderry, Vermont (1868–1897). In 1903 he married Maud Emerson (1870–1940) of Brattleboro. With his first wife, Fitts had two sons, Robert and Stanley. His children with his second wife included son Osmer and daughter Miriam.

Party political offices
New title	Republican nominee for Vermont Attorney General; 1906	Succeeded by John G. Sargent
Legal offices
Preceded by None	Vermont Attorney General; 1904-1908	Succeeded by John G. Sargent
