= Frank D. Thompson =

American judge (1876–1940)

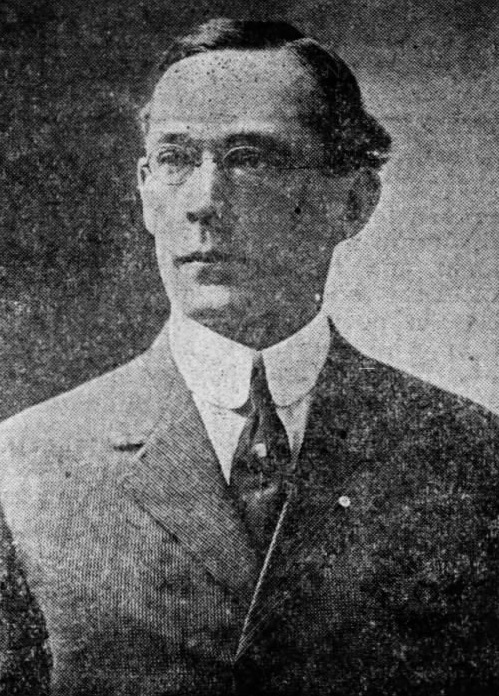
- From May 22, 1912 Thompson for Congress newspaper advertisement

Associate Justice of the Vermont Supreme Court
- In office 1929–1937
- Preceded by: George M. Powers
- Succeeded by: John S. Buttles

Chief Judge of the Vermont Superior Court
- In office 1929–1929
- Preceded by: Julius A. Willcox
- Succeeded by: Warner A. Graham

Judge of the Vermont Superior Court
- In office 1923–1929
- Preceded by: Fred M. Butler
- Succeeded by: Allen R. Sturtevant

Member of the Vermont House of Representatives from Barton
- In office 1923–1923
- Preceded by: Charles A. Barrows
- Succeeded by: John Howard Bartlett

State's Attorney of Orleans County, Vermont
- In office 1918–1921
- Preceded by: Colby Stoddard
- Succeeded by: Albert W. Farman

Judge of the Municipal Court of Orleans County, Vermont
- In office 1910–1915
- Preceded by: Henry B. Cushman
- Succeeded by: Henry B. Cushman

State's Attorney of Caledonia County, Vermont
- In office 1904–1906
- Preceded by: Melvin G. Morse
- Succeeded by: Guy W. Hill

Personal details
- Born: April 9, 1876 Irasburg, Vermont, U.S.
- Died: June 12, 1940 (aged 64) Barton, Vermont
- Resting place: Welcome O. Brown Cemetery, Barton, Vermont
- Party: Republican
- Spouse: Mabel Miles (m. 1900–1940, his death)
- Parent(s): Laforrest H. Thompson; Mary Eliza (Dutton) Thompson
- Relatives: Willard W. Miles (father in law)
- Education: Boston University School of Law
- Profession: Attorney

Frank D. Thompson (April 9, 1876 – June 12, 1940) was a Vermont attorney and judge. He is most notable for his service as an associate justice of the Vermont Supreme Court from 1929 to 1937.

== Early life ==
Frank Dutton Thompson was born in Irasburg, Vermont, on April 9, 1876, the son of Laforrest H. Thompson and Mary Eliza (Dutton) Thompson. Laforrest Thompson was a prominent lawyer, politician and judge, and he served as President of the Vermont Senate and an associate justice of the Vermont Supreme Court.

Frank Thompson graduated from St. Johnsbury Academy in 1894, and attended the University of Vermont from 1894 to 1895. He then studied law with Wendell Phillips Stafford, after which he enrolled at Boston University School of Law, from which he graduated with an LL.B. degree in 1899. After attaining admission to the bar in 1899, Thompson practiced law in St. Johnsbury, Vermont until moving to Barton in 1906.

== Political career ==
A Republican, Thompson became active in local and state politics. He served as state's attorney for Caledonia County from 1904 to 1906. After moving to Barton, he served as judge of the Orleans County municipal court from 1910 to 1915. Thompson was a candidate for the Republican nomination for the United States House of Representatives from Vermont's 2nd congressional district in 1912, but withdrew before the nominating convention in favor of incumbent Frank Plumley, who was renominated and reelected. He was a Theodore Roosevelt delegate to the 1912 Republican National Convention, but declined to support the Progressive Party after the convention and switched his backing to the incumbent president, William Howard Taft. In addition to service as a village trustee and village attorney, Thompson became active in several businesses, including service on the board of directors of the Barton Savings Bank and Trust Company and Barton's Marl Products Company.

Thompson served on the Vermont Board of Bar Examiners from 1916 to 1919. In 1918 he was an unsuccessful candidate for the Republican nomination for state's attorney of Orleans County. When the incumbent died, Thompson was appointed to fill the vacancy, and he served until 1921. From 1919 until 1923, Thompson served as reporter of decisions for the Vermont Supreme Court. In 1920, he ran unsuccessfully for the Republican nomination to represent Barton in the Vermont House of Representatives. He won the seat in 1922, and was serving in 1923 when he was selected for a judgeship.

== Judicial career ==
In 1923, Thompson was appointed as a judge of the Vermont Superior Court. He advanced through seniority to become the chief judge, and continued to serve until 1929. In December 1929, he was named an associate justice of the Vermont Supreme Court, succeeding George M. Powers, who had been promoted to chief justice. Thompson held this position until retiring in 1937 because of ill health, and was succeeded by John S. Buttles.

== Honors ==
In 1934, Thompson received the honorary degree of LL.D. from the University of Vermont.

== Death and burial ==
In retirement, Thompson was a resident of Barton. He died in Barton on June 12, 1940. He was buried at Welcome O. Brown Cemetery in Barton.

== Family ==
In 1900, Thompson married Mabel Miles, the daughter of Willard W. Miles, who served as an associate justice of the Vermont Supreme Court. They had no children.

== Sources ==
=== Newspapers ===
- "F. D. Thompson for Republican Ticket". Burlington Daily News. Burlington, VT. August 1, 1912 – via Newspapers.com.
- "Stoddard Re-nominated". Orleans County Monitor. Barton, VT. September 11, 1918 – via Newspapers.com.
- "State's Attorney: Frank D. Thompson Appointed in Orleans County". The Caledonian-Record. St. Johnsbury, VT. October 15, 1918 – via Newspapers.com.
- "Thompson Made Supreme Court Reporter". Orleans County Monitor. Barton, VT. April 23, 1919 – via Newspapers.com.
- "Barrows Wins in Barton". Orleans County Monitor. Barton, VT. September 15, 1920 – via Newspapers.com.
- "Farman Wins for State's Attorney". Orleans County Monitor. Barton, VT. September 15, 1920 – via Newspapers.com.
- "Judge Butler is Elected to Supreme Bench". The Burlington Free Press. Burlington, VT. January 23, 1923 – via Newspapers.com.
- "Shields Reporter of Decisions". The Burlington Free Press. Burlington, VT. February 16, 1923 – via Newspapers.com.
- "Weeks Names Powers Chief Justice, Thompson Associate". The Burlington Free Press. Burlington, VT. December 14, 1929 – via Newspapers.com.
- "Sophie Kerr Given Degree at Vermont". Oakland Tribune. Oakland, CA. Associated Press. June 18, 1934 – via Newspapers.com.
- "Justice Thompson Not a Candidate for Re-election". The Burlington Free Press. Burlington, VT. January 13, 1937 – via Newspapers.com.
- "Buttles Elevated to Supreme Court and Adams is Made Superior Judge". The Burlington Free Press. Burlington, VT. January 22, 1937 – via Newspapers.com.
- "Frank D. Thompson, Former Supreme Court Justice, Dies". The Burlington Free Press. Burlington, VT. June 14, 1940 – via Newspapers.com.
- "Funeral of Justice Thompson". The Burlington Free Press. Burlington, VT. June 17, 1940 – via Newspapers.com.

=== Books ===
- Baldwin, Frederick W. (1916). History of Bank of Orleans. Burlington, VT: Free Press Printing Company.
- Marquis, Albert Nelson (1916). Who's Who in New England (2 ed.). Chicago, IL: A. N. Marquis. p. 1061.
- Myrick, Rawson C. (1931). Vermont Legislative Directory. Montpelier, VT: Vermont Secretary of State.
- Ullery, Jacob G. (1894). Men of Vermont Illustrated. Brattleboro, VT: Transcript Publishing Company.

Political offices
Preceded by George M. Powers	Justice of the Vermont Supreme Court; 1929–1937	Succeeded by John S. Buttles
