= John H. Downs =

American politician (1919–2011)

Member of the Vermont House of Representatives
- In office 1961–1965

Personal details
- Born: November 12, 1919 Arlington, Massachusetts, U.S.
- Died: June 28, 2011 (aged 91) Williston, Vermont, U.S.
- Education: Yale College; Harvard Law School

John H. Downs (November 12, 1919 – June 28, 2011) was an American politician. He served as a member of the Vermont House of Representatives, where he chaired the Ways and Means committee. He was a long time resident of St. Johnsbury, Vermont.

== Education ==
Downs was a graduate of Yale University and Harvard Law School.

== Career ==
Downs worked as a lawyer at the law firm of Downs Rachlin Marting PLLC and was elected to be the Caledonia County's state attorney in the early 1950s. He served two terms as a Vermont state representative. After serving in the state house he was a delegate to the 1964 Republican National Convention and later switched parties and served as a delegate to the 1968 Democratic National Convention and the 1972 Democratic National Convention.

He served as the chair of the Vermont Bar Association from 1974 to 1975.
