= Senator Dart =

Senator Dart may refer to:

- Tom Dart (born 1962), Illinois State Senate
- William A. Dart (1814–1890), New York State Senate
- Justus Dartt (1836–1912), Vermont State Senate
