= Justice Start =

Justice Start may refer to:

- Charles M. Start (1839–1919), chief justice of the Minnesota Supreme Court
- Henry R. Start (1845–1905), associate justice of the Vermont Supreme Court
