= John C. Sherburne =

American judge (1883–1959)

Chief Justice of the Vermont Supreme Court
- In office 1949–1955
- Preceded by: Sherman R. Moulton
- Succeeded by: Olin M. Jeffords

Associate Justice of the Vermont Supreme Court
- In office 1934–1949
- Preceded by: Warner A. Graham
- Succeeded by: Samuel H. Blackmer

Chief Judge of the Vermont Superior Court
- In office 1931–1934
- Preceded by: Warner A. Graham
- Succeeded by: John S. Buttles

Judge of the Vermont Superior Court
- In office 1926–1934
- Preceded by: Warner A. Graham
- Succeeded by: Olin M. Jeffords

Member of the Vermont Senate from Orange County
- In office 1921–1923
- Preceded by: Clinton Adams
- Succeeded by: Edna Beard

State's Attorney of Orange County, Vermont
- In office 1917–1921
- Preceded by: Frank S. Williams
- Succeeded by: Millward C. Taft

Personal details
- Born: August 31, 1883 Pomfret, Vermont, U.S.
- Died: June 30, 1959 (aged 75) Randolph, Vermont, U.S.
- Resting place: South View Cemetery, Randolph, Vermont, U.S.
- Party: Republican
- Spouse: Alice Charlotte McIntyre (m. 1913)
- Children: 2
- Education: University of Vermont; Wadham College of Oxford University
- Profession: Attorney

John C. Sherburne (August 31, 1883 – June 30, 1959) was a Vermont attorney and judge. His career was most notable for his service as an associate justice of the Vermont Supreme Court from 1934 to 1949, and the court's Chief Justice from 1949 to 1955.

== Early life ==
John Calvin Sherburne was born in Pomfret, Vermont on August 31, 1883, the son of John C. and Cynthia E. (Giddlings) Sherburne. The elder John C. Sherburne held several local offices in Pomfret, and served as a member of the Vermont House of Representatives.

The younger John Sherburne was educated in Pomfret, and graduated from Woodstock High School. He then attended the University of Vermont, from which he graduated in 1904. Sherburne was a member of Delta Psi and Phi Beta Kappa. From 1904 to 1907 he studied at Wadham College of Oxford University as a Rhodes Scholar, the first Vermonter to attain this distinction.

During the summer breaks from his university courses, Sherburne studied law in the Bethel office of Hunton and Stickney. Upon returning to the United States, he settled in Randolph, where he was admitted to the bar and began a practice.

== Start of career ==
In addition to practicing law, Sherburne was a referee in bankruptcy from 1908 to 1916. A Republican in politics, from 1917 to 1921 he was State's Attorney of Orange County. In 1920, he was elected to the Vermont Senate, and he served one term. From January 1923 to April 1926, he was Secretary of Civil and Military Affairs (chief assistant) during the governorships of Redfield Proctor Jr. and Franklin S. Billings.

== Judicial career ==
In April, 1926, Sherburne was appointed a judge of the Vermont Superior Court. In 1934, he was appointed an associate justice of the Vermont Supreme Court, filling the vacancy left by the death of Warner A. Graham. He was appointed Chief Justice in 1949, filling the vacancy created by the retirement of Sherman R. Moulton, and was succeeded as an associate justice by Samuel H. Blackmer. Sherburne served as chief justice until retiring in 1955, and was succeeded by Olin M. Jeffords.

== Honors ==
In 1919, Sherburne received the honorary degree of LL.D. from the University of Vermont.

== Death and burial ==
Sherburne died at his home in Randolph on June 30, 1959, as the result of injuries he sustained after a fall down the stairs while moving a suitcase in preparation for a trip to visit his sister in Connecticut. He was buried at South View Cemetery in Randolph.

== Family ==
On May 1, 1913, Sherburne married Alice Charlotte McIntyre (1885–1962). They were the parents of two children, son Henry M. and daughter Frances E.

== Sources ==
=== Books ===
- Dodge, Prentiss Cutler (1912). Encyclopedia of Vermont Biography. Burlington, VT: Ullery Publishing Company. p. 311.
- McIntire, R. H. (1949). The MacIntyre, McIntyre and McIntire Clan of Scotland, Ireland, Canada, and New England. Baltimore, MD: Robert Harry McIntire. ISBN 9780608318028.
- Stone, Arthur F. (1929). The Vermont of Today. Vol. III. New York, NY: Lewis Historical Publishing Company.

=== Newspapers ===
- "North Pomfret: John C. Sherburne". Spirit of the Age. Woodstock, VT. October 1, 1904 – via Newspapers.com.
- "Pomfret: John C. Sherburne". Spirit of the Age. Woodstock, VT. July 22, 1905 – via Newspapers.com.
- "They Are Elevated". Burlington Free Press. Burlington, VT. February 8, 1934 – via Newspapers.com.
- "Judge S. H. Blackmer is Elevated Today". Burlington Free Press. Burlington, VT. April 1, 1949 – via Newspapers.com.
- "UVM Honorary Degrees Are Awarded To 5". Burlington Free Press. Burlington, VT. June 21, 1949 – via Newspapers.com.
- "Olin M. Jeffords becomes State's 31st Chief Justice". Burlington Free Press. Burlington, VT. February 18, 1955 – via Newspapers.com.
- "John Sherburne, Former Chief Justice, Dies". Burlington Free Press. Burlington, VT. July 1, 1959 – via Newspapers.com.
- "Obituary, Alice M. Sherburne". Burlington Free Press. Burlington, VT. December 4, 1962 – via Newspapers.com.

=== Internet ===
- Frink, E. H. (Randolph, VT Town Clerk) (July 2, 1959). "Vermont Death Records, 1909-2008, Entry for John Calvin Sherburne". Ancestry.com. Provo, UT: Ancestry.com, LLC.
- Frink, E. H. (Randolph, VT Town Clerk) (January 2, 1963). "Vermont Death Records, 1909-2008, Entry for Alice Charlotte Sherburne". Ancestry.com. Provo, UT: Ancestry.com, LLC.

Political offices
Preceded by Warner A. Graham	Associate Justice of the Vermont Supreme Court; 1934–1949	Succeeded by Samuel H. Blackmer
Preceded by Sherman R. Moulton	Chief Justice of the Vermont Supreme Court; 1949–1955	Succeeded by Olin M. Jeffords
