= Samuel H. Blackmer =

American judge (1902–1951)

Samuel Howard Blackmer (March 2, 1902 – December 25, 1951) was a Vermont attorney, politician, and judge. He was appointed as an associate justice of the Vermont Supreme Court in 1949, and served until his death.

== Early life ==
Blackmer was born in Bennington, Vermont on March 2, 1902, the son of Samuel Huling Blackmer and Fanny (Abbott) Blackmer. He attended the schools of Bennington, and in 1920 he graduated from the Hotchkiss School in Lakeville, Connecticut. He graduated from Yale University with a Bachelor of Arts degree in 1924, and was a member of Zeta Psi and Delta Sigma Rho. In 1927, Blackmer received his LL.B. degree from Harvard Law School, where he was a member of the Lincoln's Inn Society. He was admitted to the bar in 1927, and practiced in Bennington as the partner of Judge William J. Meagher, who had married Fanny Blackmer after the 1911 death of Samuel Huling Blackmer.

== Early career ==
A Republican, Blackmer served as an Old Bennington village trustee from 1927 to 1938. He served as a justice of the peace from 1929 to 1938, and was Bennington's municipal court judge from 1929 to 1932. from 1933 to 1935 he represented Bennington in the Vermont House of Representatives. He served as State's Attorney of Bennington County from 1935 to 1937.

During the governorship of George Aiken, Blackmer served as his executive clerk from 1937 to 1938.

== Judicial career ==
In 1938, Aiken appointed Blackmer a judge of the Vermont Superior Court. He rose through seniority to become the court's chief judge, and served until 1949. In April 1949, Blackmer was named as an associate justice of the Vermont Supreme Court, filling the vacancy created when John C. Sherburne was promoted to chief justice. Blackmer served on the Supreme Court until his death, and was succeeded by Stephen S. Cushing.

== Death and burial ==
Blackmer died unexpectedly of a heart attack in Bennington on December 25, 1951. He was buried at Old Bennington Cemetery.

== Family ==
On July 20, 1925, Blackmer married Katrina Roosevelt Schuyler, the daughter of Marie Louise (Nelson) Schuyler (b. 1865) and the Reverend Philip Schuyler (1861-1942), a member of New York's prominent Schuyler family. They were the parents of a daughter, Patricia Ann (1927-1998).

== Legacy ==
The Samuel H. Blackmer Memorial Library was incorporated in August 1952. It was established in the Bennington County Courthouse, and included the books from Blackmer's personal law library, as well as an endowment from his family.

== Sources ==
=== Books ===
- Armstrong, Howard E. (1951). Vermont Legislative Directory and State Manual. Montpelier, VT: Vermont Secretary of State.
- Howes, Durward (1938). America's Young Men. Vol. 3. Los Angeles, CA: Richard Blank Publishing Company.
- Stone, Arthur F. (1929). The Vermont of Today, with its Historic Background, Attractions and People. Vol. III. New York, NY: Lewis Historical Publishing Company.
- Vermont Bar Association (1952). Report of Proceedings of the Annual Meeting. Vol. 46. Montpelier, VT: Argus and Patriot Steam Book Press.

=== Newspapers ===
- "John C. Sherburne Elected Chief Justice of Vt.; Chief Superior Judge Blackmer is Elevated to a Seat in Supreme Court". Burlington Free Press. Burlington, VT. April 2, 1949 – via Newspapers.com.
- "Judge Blackmer, 49, Dies; Was Youngest High Court Justice". Burlington Free Press. Burlington, VT. December 26, 1951 – via Newspapers.com.
- "Emerson's Appointments". Burlington Free Press. Burlington, VT. January 12, 1952 – via Newspapers.com.

=== Internet ===
- Cassano, Lynn M. (1990). "Samuel H. Blackmer (1902-1951) in the Bennington, Vermont Cemetery Inscriptions". Ancestry.com. Proro, UT: Ancestry.com, LLC.
- Lettre, Cassandra J. (Assistant Bennington, VT Town Clerk) (May 13, 1998). "Vermont, Death Records, 1909-2008 for Patricia Blackmer Thibodeau". Ancestry.com. Proro, UT: Ancestry.com, LLC.

=== Magazines ===
- Morehouse, Clifford P. (April 1, 1942). "Death Notice: Canon Philip Schuyler". The Living Church. Milwaukee, WI: Morehouse-Gorham Co.
- Vermont Library Association (1970). "Law Libraries". Vermont Libraries. Vol. 1. Montpelier, VT: Vermont Department of Libraries.

Political offices
Preceded by John C. Sherburne	Justice of the Vermont Supreme Court; 1949–1951	Succeeded by Stephen S. Cushing
