= Alexander Dunnett =

American politician

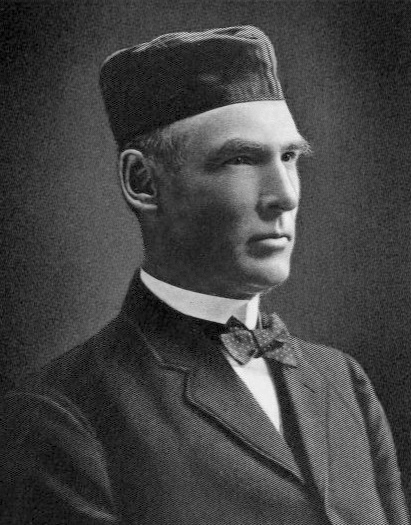
- From Volume 5 (1923) of Vermont, The Green Mountain State

United States Attorney for the District of Vermont
- In office 1906–1915
- President: Theodore Roosevelt; William Howard Taft; Woodrow Wilson
- Preceded by: James Loren Martin
- Succeeded by: Vernon A. Bullard

President of the Vermont Bar Association
- In office 1907–1908
- Preceded by: Fred M. Butler
- Succeeded by: James K. Batchelder

Member of the Vermont Senate from Caledonia County
- In office 1900–1901 Serving with Gilbert M. Campbell
- Preceded by: Harry Blodgett; Thomas B. Hall
- Succeeded by: Truman R. Stiles; Preston H. Graves

State's Attorney of Caledonia County, Vermont
- In office 1886–1890
- Preceded by: Marshall Montgomery
- Succeeded by: Harry Blodgett

Personal details
- Born: November 29, 1852 Peacham, Vermont
- Died: September 14, 1920 (aged 67) Groton, Vermont
- Resting place: Hillside Cemetery, Ryegate, Vermont
- Party: Republican
- Spouse(s): Ella J. White (m. 1879, d. 1881); Sarah M. Town (m. 1884, d. 1888); Ella Chalmers (m. 1890)
- Children: 1
- Education: Randolph Normal School; Boston University School of Law
- Profession: Attorney

Alexander Dunnett (November 29, 1852 - September 14, 1920) was an attorney and politician from Vermont. A Republican, he was most notable for his service as State's Attorney of Caledonia County (1886–1890), a member of the Vermont Senate (1900–1901), and United States Attorney for the District of Vermont (1906–1915).

== Early life ==
Alexander Dunnett was born in Peacham, Vermont on November 29, 1852, the son of Andrew and Christianne (Galbraith) Dunnett. He was raised and educated in Peacham and Ryegate, and attended McIndoes Academy and Newbury Seminary. While a teenager, Dunnett was working on a railroad construction crew when a large stone fell on him. He sustained a crushed pelvis, and doctors feared he would not survive. Dunnett recovered, but the effects of the injury resulted in a unique gait when he walked and the carrying of one shoulder lower than the other. He graduated from the Randolph Normal School (now Vermont Technical College) in 1874, and taught school while studying law with attorney Nelson L. Boyden of Randolph. Dunnett then attended courses at Boston University School of Law to complete his legal education, and attained admission to the bar in 1877.

== Start of career ==
Dunnett practiced in Ryegate before relocating to St. Johnsbury, where he practiced law with various partners at different times, including Albro F. Nichols, Leighton P. Slack, Charles E. Leslie, and Charles A. Shields.

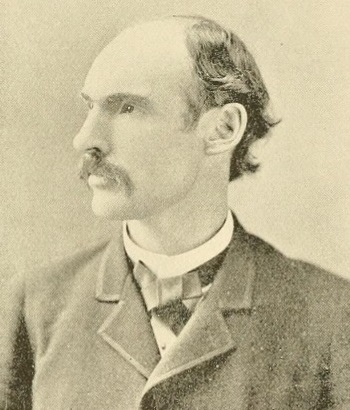
From 1894's Men of Vermont Illustrated

A Republican, while living in Ryegate, Dunnett served as school superintendent and town meeting moderator. After moving to St. Johnsbury, he was chosen to moderate its town meeting for several years. Dunnett served as State's Attorney for Caledonia County from 1896 to 1900. In addition, he was the longtime chairman of the Caledonia County Republican Committee, and served as chairman of the Vermont Republican Party's 1900 convention.

== Later career ==
From 1900 to 1901 he represented Caledonia County in the Vermont Senate. From 1906 to 1915, Dunnett was United States Attorney for the District of Vermont. He was President of the Vermont Bar Association from 1907 to 1908.

During the 1912 campaign for president, William Howard Taft campaigned in St. Johnsbury, and Dunnett was chosen to make the speech that introduced him. In 1914, Dunnett was a candidate for the Republican U.S. House nomination in Vermont's 2nd District. Porter H. Dale won on the 21st ballot at the state party convention, and went on to win the general election. In 1916, Dunnett was an alternate delegate to the Republican National Convention.

Dunnett was a Freemason, and was also active as a Royal Arch Mason and a member of the Knights Templar.

== Death and burial ==
Dunnett suffered from kidney disease in his later years, and became ill while attending the 1920 Republican National Convention, where he delivered a seconding speech in support of Calvin Coolidge for vice president. He died at his summer home on Lake Groton in Groton, Vermont on September 14, 1920. Dunnett was buried at Hillside Cemetery in Ryegate.

== Honors ==
Dunnett was a longtime member of the Norwich University board of trustees, and vice president of the university corporation. In 1917, NU awarded him the honorary degree of Master of Science.

== Family ==
Dunnett was married three times. In 1879, he married Ella J. White, who died in 1881. In 1884, he married Sarah M. Town, who died in 1888. In 1890, Dunnett married Ella Chalmers, the widow of Reverend John R. Chalmers of St. Johnsbury. With his first wife, Dunnett was the father of son Jim A. Dunnett, who was born and died in 1881.

== Sources ==
=== Newspapers ===
- "Alex. Dunnett Has Been Called Upon To Part With His Little Boy". St. Johnsbury Index. St. Johnsbury, VT. September 30, 1881 – via Newspapers.com.
- "President Taft: St. Johnsbury's Guest for a Few Hours This Afternoon". St. Johnsbury Republican. St. Johnsbury, VT. October 6, 1912 – via Newspapers.com.
- "Porter H. Dale Wins". Orleans County Monitor. Barton, VT. September 9, 1914 – via Library of Congress: Chronicling America; Historic American Newspapers.
- "Norwich University: Honorary Degree of Master of Science Conferred On Alexander Dunnett". St. Johnsbury Republican. St. Johnsbury, VT. September 26, 1917 – via Newspapers.com.
- "Demise of Alexander Dunnett". The Evening Argus. Montpelier, VT. September 15, 1920 – via Newspapers.com.
- "Old Norwich Overflowing: Buildings of University at Northfield Taxed to Utmost; Pres. Plumley Spoke Feelingly To-Day of Death of Alexander Dunnett". Barre Daily Times. Barre, VT. September 16, 1920 – via Newspapers.com.
- "Many Notables Pay Tribute to Mr. Dunnett". The Weekly Caledonian. St. Johnsbury, VT. September 22, 1920 – via Newspapers.com.
- "Interesting Events in the Life of the Late Alexander Dunnett". St. Johnsbury Republican. St. Johnsbury, VT. January 26, 1921 – via Newspapers.com.

=== Books ===
- Carleton, Hiram (1903). Genealogical and Family History of the State of Vermont. New York, NY: Lewis Publishing Company. ISBN 9780806347943.
- Crockett, Walter Hill (1923). Vermont, the Green Mountain State. New York, NY: Century History Company.
