= Charles H. Stearns =

American businessman and politician

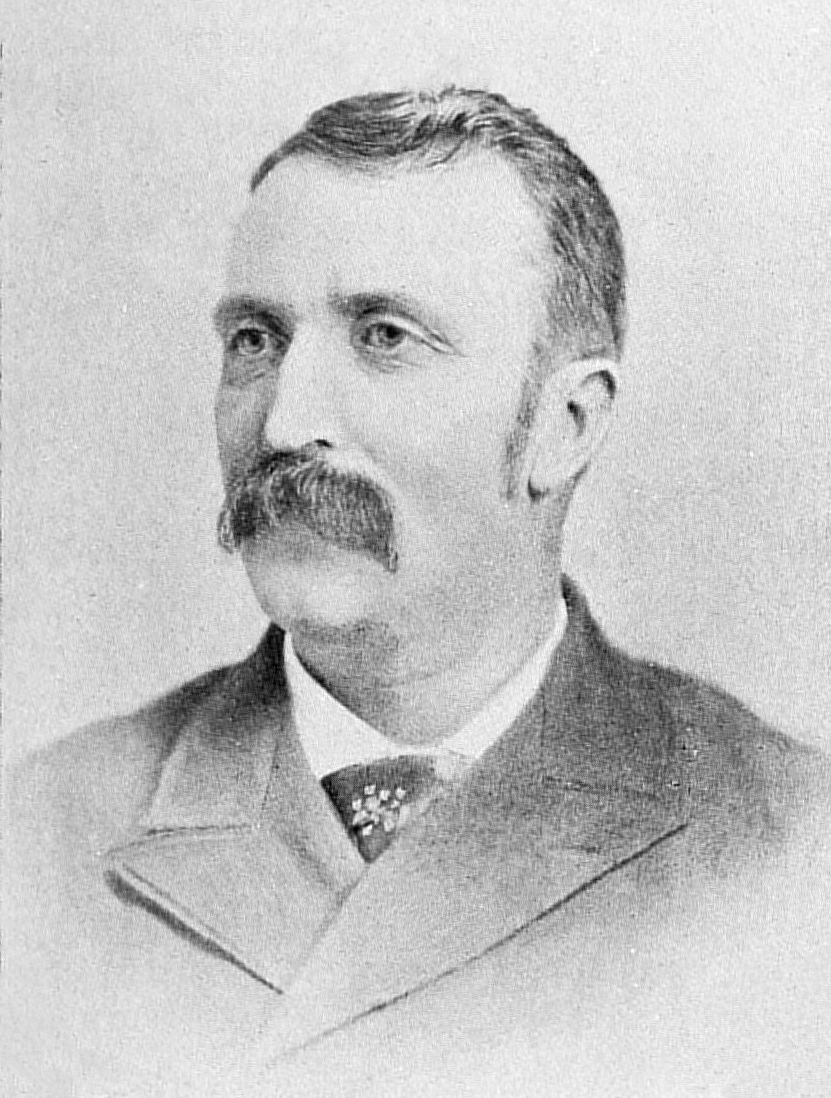

45th Lieutenant Governor of Vermont
- In office October 5, 1904 – October 3, 1906
- Governor: Charles J. Bell
- Preceded by: Zed S. Stanton
- Succeeded by: George H. Prouty

Member of the Vermont Senate from Lamoille County
- In office October 5, 1898 – October 2, 1900
- Preceded by: Roger W. Hulburd
- Succeeded by: Paphro D. Pike

Member of the Vermont House of Representatives from Johnson
- In office October 6, 1886 – October 2, 1888
- Preceded by: Sumner A. Andrews
- Succeeded by: Isaac L. Pearl

Personal details
- Born: February 7, 1854 Johnson, Vermont, US
- Died: October 12, 1936 (aged 82) Medfield, Massachusetts, US
- Resting place: Lamoille View Cemetery, Johnson, Vermont
- Party: Republican
- Spouse: Viola A. Hall (m. 1876-1926, her death)
- Children: 1
- Education: Vermont Seminary, Montpelier, Vermont
- Profession: Businessman

Charles Henry Stearns (February 7, 1854 – October 12, 1936) was a businessman and politician who served as 45th lieutenant governor of Vermont for one term.

== Early life ==
Charles Henry Stearns was born in Johnson, Vermont, on February 7, 1854. He was educated in Johnson and graduated from the State Normal School (later Johnson State College and now Northern Vermont University) and Vermont Seminary in Montpelier.

== Business career ==
Stearns joined his family's business manufacturing butter tubs and other wood products, and eventually expanded the company into other areas of the lumber business, including logging lands in Canada. He also became active in other enterprises, including a dry goods store and a granite quarry and stone products business. He also served as a director and president of the Union Bank and Trust Company of Morrisville.

== Political career ==
Stearns was active in government and politics, including service as chairman of the Lamoille County Republican Committee, and Johnson Town Treasurer. He was elected to the Vermont House of Representatives from 1886 to 1888 and the Vermont Senate from 1898 to 1890. In 1904 he was elected lieutenant governor, serving until 1906.

== Family ==
In 1876, Stearns married Viola A. Hall of Johnson. They were the parents of a son, C. Arthur Stearns.

== Death and burial ==
Stearns died in Medfield, Massachusetts, on October 12, 1936. He was buried in Johnson's Lamoille View Cemetery.

== Legacy ==
C. H. Stearns Company is still active in Johnson as a convenience store and gas station, and one of his partnerships, Parker and Stearns, still operates as a construction supply and equipment business.

Stearns Hall at Johnson State College is named after him.

Party political offices
Preceded by Zed S. Stanton	Republican nominee for Lieutenant Governor of Vermont; 1904	Succeeded by George H. Prouty
Political offices
Preceded by Zed S. Stanton	Lieutenant Governor of Vermont; 1904–1906	Succeeded by George H. Prouty
