= John S. Buttles =

American judge (1877–1949)

John S. Battles
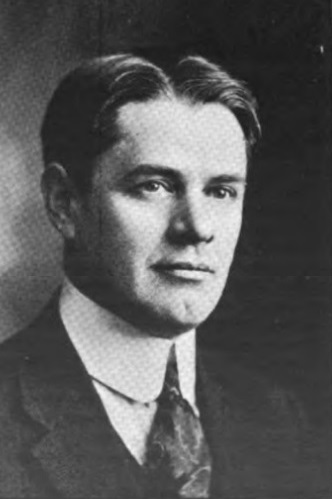
- From 1919's Vermont, Its Government, by Walter J. Bigelow

Associate Justice of the Vermont Supreme Court
- In office 1937–1949
- Preceded by: Frank D. Thompson
- Succeeded by: Charles Bayley Adams

Chief Judge of the Vermont Superior Court
- In office 1934–1937
- Preceded by: John C. Sherburne
- Succeeded by: Alfred L. Sherman

Judge of the Vermont Superior Court
- In office 1926–1937
- Preceded by: Sherman R. Moulton
- Succeeded by: Charles Bayley Adams

Vermont Commissioner of Industries
- In office 1919–1926
- Preceded by: Robert W. Simonds
- Succeeded by: Clarence R. White

Personal details
- Born: January 20, 1877 Troy, New York, U.S.
- Died: May 18, 1949 (aged 72) Rutland, Vermont, U.S.
- Resting place: Pine Hill Cemetery, Brandon, Vermont, U.S.
- Party: Republican
- Spouse(s): Marilla J. Whitcomb (m. 1901); Marion E. Seager (m. 1914)
- Children: 1
- Education: University of Vermont; New York Law School
- Profession: Attorney

Military service
- Service: Vermont Volunteer Militia
- Years of service: 1917–1919
- Rank: Captain
- Unit: 1st Regiment, Vermont Volunteer Militia
- Commands: Company C, 1st Regiment, Vermont Volunteer Militia
- Wars: World War I

John S. Buttles (January 20, 1877 – May 18, 1949) was an American attorney and judge. He served as an associate justice of the Vermont Supreme Court from 1937 to 1949.

== Early life ==
John Stephen Buttles was born in Troy, New York on January 20, 1877, the son of Hiram S. and Sybil G. (Selleck) Buttles. He was raised in Brandon, Vermont, and graduated from Brandon High School in 1893. He received a Ph.B. degree from the University of Vermont in 1897, and was a member of Kappa Sigma and Phi Beta Kappa. He taught school in Rutland, Massachusetts, and then began attendance at New York Law School, from which he received an LL.B. degree in 1900. Buttles was admitted to the bar, and worked as an attorney for the New York Life Insurance Company in New York City, Dubuque, Iowa, and Chicago until returning to Vermont in 1905.

== Continued career ==
Buttles settled first in Rutland, and later in Brandon, and became a partner in the law practice of Ebenezer J. Ormsbee. A Republican, he served in several local offices, including assistant judge of Rutland's city court, and Brandon's town meeting moderator and grand juror (city court prosecutor). In 1916, he was an unsuccessful candidate for the Republican nomination for State's Attorney of Rutland County.

During World War I, Buttles served in Company C, 1st Regiment of the Vermont Volunteer Militia, the organization formed to perform home guard duties while soldiers of the Vermont National Guard were activated for overseas duty. Commissioned as a first lieutenant in 1917, he was promoted to captain and company commander in December 1918.

In 1918, Buttles was elected to the Vermont House of Representatives. He was serving in the House in April 1919, when he was appointed Vermont's Commissioner of Industries. He served as commissioner until 1926, when he was appointed to the bench.

== Judicial career ==
In November 1926, Buttles resigned as Commissioner of Industries in order to accept appointment as a judge of the Vermont Superior Court. He served until 1937, and advanced through seniority to become the court's chief judge.

In January 1937, Buttles was appointed as an associate justice of the Vermont Supreme Court, replacing Frank D. Thompson, who had retired. He served on the court until retiring in January 1949, and was succeeded by Charles Bayley Adams.

== Death and burial ==
Buttles died at the hospital in Rutland on May 19, 1949. He was buried at Pine Hill Cemetery in Brandon.

== Family ==
On May 28, 1901, Buttles married Marilla J. Whitcomb (1878–1911). In 1914, Buttles married Marion E. Seager (1875–1951). With his first wife, Buttles was the father of a son, Robert S. Buttles (1904–1982).

== Sources ==
=== Newspapers ===
- "School Notes". Brandon Union. Brandon, VT. April 28, 1893 – via Newspapers.com.
- "LL.B. for 135 Young Men: Commencement Exercises of the New York Law School Held in Carnegie Hall". Brooklyn Daily Eagle. Brooklyn, NY. June 15, 1900 – via Newspapers.com.
- "John S. Buttles, of this town..." Brandon Union. Brandon, VT. May 31, 1901 – via Newspapers.com.
- "City News: Mrs. Dora M. Whitcomb and Daughter". The Burlington Free Press. Burlington, VT. February 24, 1905 – via Newspapers.com.
- "John S. Buttles, attorney of Rutland City, has been elected assistant judge of the city court". Brandon Union. Brandon, VT. April 2, 1909 – via Newspapers.com.
- "Obituary, Mrs. John S. Buttles". The Burlington Free Press. Burlington, VT. March 18, 1911 – via Newspapers.com.
- "Town Talk: Attorney John S. Buttles". The Burlington Free Press. Burlington, VT. November 16, 1914 – via Newspapers.com.
- "Poulin Renominated". The Burlington Free Press. Burlington, VT. September 14, 1916 – via Newspapers.com.
- "Brandon Gets Volunteer Co". The Burlington Free Press. Burlington, VT. July 2, 1917 – via Newspapers.com.
- "Brandon: Election Passes Off Quietly". The Burlington Free Press. Burlington, VT. March 6, 1918 – via Newspapers.com.
- "House of Representatives: Members–Elect to the Popular Branch of Next Legislature". Bethel Courier. Bethel, VT. December 19, 1918 – via Newspapers.
- "Brandon: John S. Buttles Now Captain of Co. C, Succeeding F. P. Johnson". The Burlington Free Press. Burlington, VT. December 23, 1918 – via Newspapers.com.
- "John S. Buttles for Commissioner of Industries". Burlington Daily News. Burlington, VT. April 3, 1919 – via Newspapers.com.
- "Names Buttles Superior Judge". The Burlington Free Press. Burlington, VT. November 5, 1926 – via Newspapers.com.
- "Adams Superior Judge; Buttles to Supreme Bench". The Burlington Free Press. Burlington, VT. January 22, 1937 – via Newspapers.com.
- "Vermont Legislature Elects Miles Judge". North Adams Transcript. North Adams, MA. Associated Press. January 21, 1949 – via Newspapers.com.
- "Many Attend Rites for Justice Battles". The Burlington Free Press. Burlington, VT. May 24, 1949 – via Newspapers.com.
- "Mrs. Marion Buttles, Widow of Supreme Court Justice, Dies". The Burlington Free Press. Burlington, VT. January 18, 1951 – via Newspapers.com.

=== Books ===
- University of Vermont (1901). General Catalogue of the University of Vermont. Burlington, VT: Burlington Free Press Association. p. 185.

=== Magazines ===
- University of Vermont (1899). "Members". Phi Beta Kappa: Alpha of Vermont, 1848–1898. Burlington, VT: Burlington Free Press Association.
- Warner, George W. (July 1894). "Initiates, 1893–94". Caduceus of Kappa Sigma. Vol. 9. Philadelphia, PA: G. W. Warner.
- Covington, J. Harry (November 1897). "Personals: Alpha–Lambda". Caduceus of Kappa Sigma. Vol. 12. Easton, MD: J. H. Covington.

=== Internet ===
- Allen, Charles E. (May 28, 1901). "Vermont Vital Records, 1720–1908, Marriage Record for John S. Buttles and Marilla J. Whitcomb". Ancestry.com. Provo, UT: Ancestry.com, LLC.
- Battles, Henry P. (June 10, 1949). "Vermont Death Records, 1909-2008, Entry for John Stephen Buttles". Ancestry.com. Provo, UT: Ancestry.com, LLC.
- "Robert S. Buttles in the U.S., Social Security Death Index, 1935–2014". Ancestry.com. Provo, UT: Ancestry.com, LLC. December 3, 1982.

Political offices
Preceded by Frank D. Thompson	Associate Justice of the Vermont Supreme Court; 1937–1949	Succeeded by Charles Bayley Adams
