= Zed S. Stanton =

American attorney and judge (1848–1921)

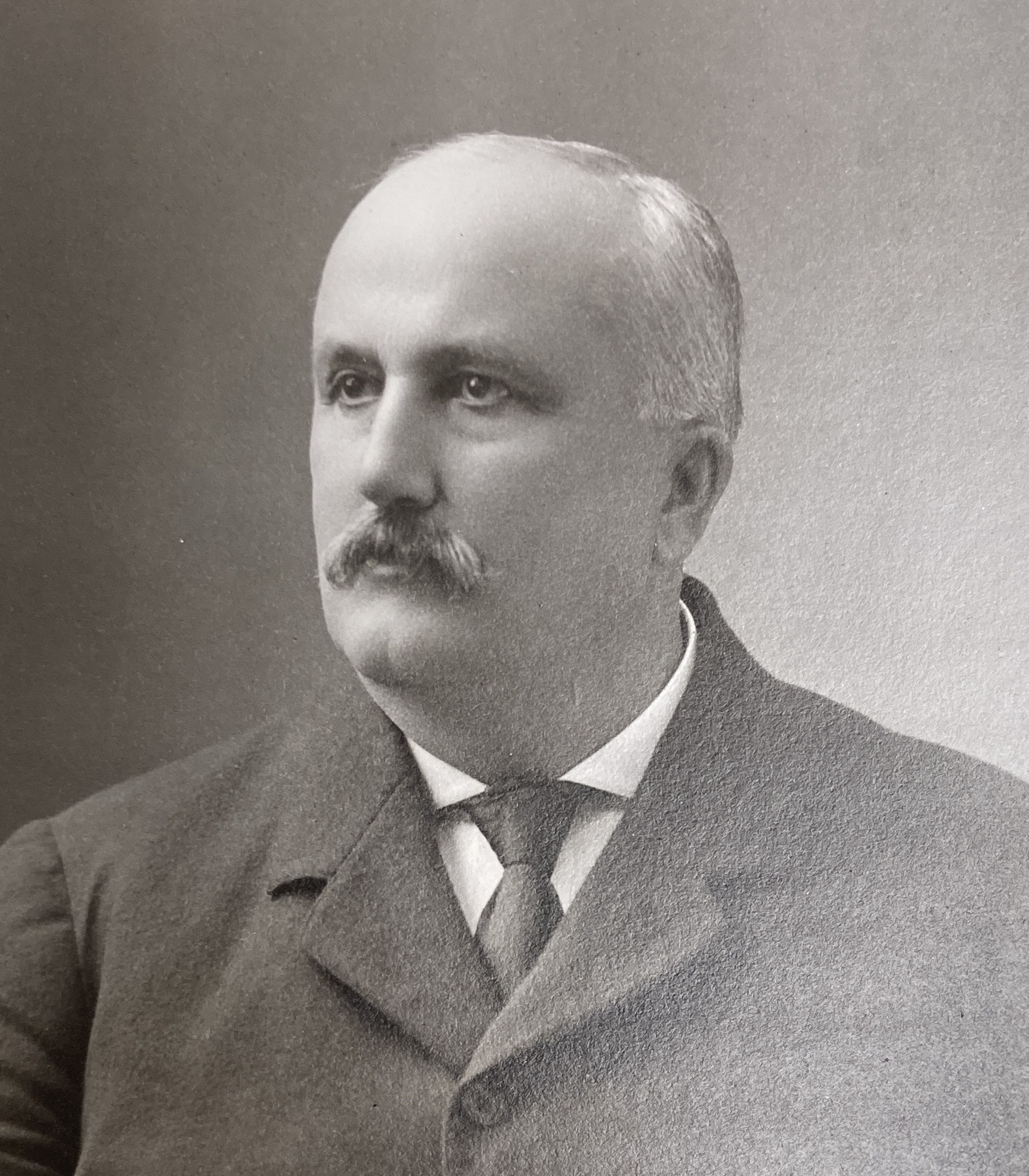
- Stanton in 1900

Chief Judge of the Vermont Superior Court
- In office 1919–1921
- Preceded by: Eleazer L. Waterman
- Succeeded by: Fred M. Butler

Judge of the Vermont Superior Court
- In office 1908–1921
- Preceded by: William H. Taylor
- Succeeded by: Julius A. Willcox

Lieutenant Governor of Vermont
- In office 1902–1904
- Governor: John G. McCullough
- Preceded by: Martin F. Allen
- Succeeded by: Charles H. Stearns

Member of the Vermont Senate from Washington County
- In office 1900–1902 Serving with Joseph A. DeBoer
- Preceded by: Edmund W. Slayton, Christopher C. Putnam Jr.
- Succeeded by: Nelson D. Phelps, William B. Mayo, George F. Sibley

Member of the Vermont Railroad Commission
- In office 1896–1898 Serving with Olin Merrill, Frank Kenfield
- Preceded by: Olin Merrill, Orion M. Barber, Charles J. Bell
- Succeeded by: David J. Foster, Alfred E. Watson, John D. Miller

State's Attorney of Washington County, Vermont
- In office 1890–1896
- Preceded by: Edward W. Bisbee
- Succeeded by: Fred A. Howland

Member of the Vermont House of Representatives from Roxbury
- In office 1884–1888
- Preceded by: George A. Young
- Succeeded by: Ira H. Fiske

Assistant Judge of Washington County, Vermont
- In office 1884–1888 Serving with William Fisher
- Preceded by: James A. Coburn, Jonathan H. Hastings
- Succeeded by: Ira S. Dwinell, Horace W. Lyford

Personal details
- Born: May 1, 1848 Roxbury, Vermont, US
- Died: August 15, 1921 (aged 73) Roxbury, Vermont, US
- Party: Republican
- Spouse: Jennie S. (Smith) Walbridge
- Children: 1
- Profession: Attorney

Zedekiah Silloway Stanton (May 1, 1848 – August 15, 1921) was an attorney and judge who served as the 44th lieutenant governor of Vermont from 1902 to 1904.

== Early life ==
Zed S. Stanton was born in Roxbury, Vermont, on May 1, 1848, the son of George B. Stanton and Lucretia Silloway. He was educated in Roxbury and graduated from Northfield High School. Stanton worked for the Vermont Central Railroad and taught school for several years. He then studied law with Congressman Frank Plumley and two other local lawyers, was admitted to the bar in 1880, and became an attorney in Roxbury.

== Political career ==
Stanton was active in the Republican Party and served in several local offices, including Justice of the Peace, Town Meeting Moderator, Town Clerk and Treasurer, School Superintendent, and school board member. He also served as Washington County Assistant Judge from 1884 to 1888.

He was elected to the Vermont House of Representatives in 1884 and 1886. From 1890 to 1896 he was Washington County State's Attorney; he was succeeded by Fred A. Howland. He served as a state Railroad Commissioner from 1896 to 1898 and was Commission Chairman from 1897 to 1898. Stanton won election to the Vermont Senate in 1900. In 1902 he won election as Lieutenant Governor and served until 1904. Because a Local Option candidate made the election a three-way race Stanton with 47.2% did not receive the popular vote majority required by the Vermont constitution, so he was officially chosen by the state legislature.

In 1908 Stanton was narrowly defeated for the Republican nomination for Governor by George H. Prouty.

== Later career ==
After losing the nomination for Governor Stanton was elected by the Vermont Assembly to serve as a Judge of the Superior Court, filling the vacancy created when Chief Judge Seneca Haselton was appointed to the Vermont Supreme Court and the other Superior judges advanced in seniority. He remained on the bench until his death, and attained by seniority the position of chief judge of the Superior Court. He was succeeded as chief judge by Fred M. Butler, who later served as an associate justice of the Vermont Supreme Court. He was succeeded as a judge on the Superior Court by Julius A. Willcox, who also later served on the Vermont Supreme Court.

== Death and burial ==
Stanton died in Roxbury on August 15, 1921.

== Other ==
In 1895 Stanton received an honorary master's degree from Norwich University.

Party political offices
Preceded by Martin F. Allen	Republican nominee for Lieutenant Governor of Vermont; 1902	Succeeded by Charles H. Stearns
Political offices
Preceded by Martin F. Allen	Lieutenant Governor of Vermont; 1902–1904	Succeeded by Charles H. Stearns
