= Charles Bayley Adams =

American judge (1887–1961)

Charles Bayley Adams (September 2, 1887 – February 6, 1961) was a Vermont politician, judge and attorney who served as President of the Vermont State Senate and a justice of the Vermont Supreme Court.

== Early life ==
Charles Bayley Adams was born in Randolph, Vermont on September 2, 1887, a son of Jairus B. Adams and Effie (Thurston) Adams. He was educated in the public schools of Randolph, and graduated from the State Normal School in Randolph in 1905 and Montpelier Seminary in 1907.

Adams received his bachelor of laws degree from the University of Maine School of Law in 1913 and settled in Waterbury, Vermont, where he established a law practice.

== Start of career ==
A Republican, Adams served in local offices including town lister (1917–1918), and town clerk and village clerk (1919 – 1937). From 1920 to 1926 he served as Washington County State's Attorney.

Adams was elected to the Vermont Senate in 1930 and served two terms, 1931 to 1935. From 1933 to 1935 he was the Senate's President Pro Tem.

In 1934 Adams was elected to the Vermont House of Representatives. He was reelected in 1936, and served from 1935 until 1937, when he resigned.

== Judicial career ==
Adams resigned from the House to accept appointment as a Judge of the Vermont Superior Court, where he served from 1937 to 1949.

In 1949 Adams was elevated to the Vermont Supreme Court, succeeding the retiring John S. Buttles, and he served as an associate justice until retiring in 1959.

== Death and burial ==
Adams died in Burlington on February 9, 1961. He was buried at Hope Cemetery in Waterbury.

== Family ==
In 1916, Adams married Jeanette Metzger of Randolph. They were the parents of two children, Charles and Catherine.

Adams' son Charles J. Adams served as Vermont Attorney General from 1962 to 1963.

Political offices
Preceded by William H. Wills	President pro tempore of the Vermont Senate; 1933 – 1935	Succeeded by William H. Wills
Preceded by John S. Buttles	Associate Justice of the Vermont Supreme Court; 1949 – 1959	Succeeded by Albert W. Barney Jr.
