= James K. Batchelder =

American lawyer and politician

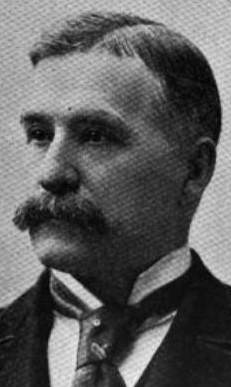

James Kendrick Batchelder (1842–1925) was a Vermont lawyer and politician.

Batchelder was born on November 10, 1842, in Peru, Vermont, the son of Ira K. and Nancy (Barnard) Batchelder.

Batchelder attended Burr and Burton Seminary and attended Middlebury College, where he became a member of Chi Psi, graduating in 1864 with an A.B. He attended Albany Law School and was admitted to the bar at Bennington in 1866.

He married Alta Parsons on October 27, 1868, in Arlington, Vermont.

Batchelder served as state's attorney for Bennington County from 1874-1884. He was a Republican presidential elector in 1880 and served as vice president of the Vermont Bar Association in 1888. He practiced in Arlington until 1884 and from 1884 in Bennington. He was a member of the firm Batchelder & Bates with his partner Edward Louis Bates.

Batchelder served five terms in the Vermont House of Representatives, including a term as Speaker from 1884-1886.

From 1908 to 1909, he was President of the Vermont Bar Association, succeeding Alexander Dunnett. Batchelder lost bids for governor of Vermont in 1886 and 1910.

He died on November 29, 1925, in Manchester, Vermont.

Political offices
Preceded by James Loren Martin	Speaker of the Vermont House of Representatives; 1884–1886	Succeeded by Josiah Grout
