= Eleazer L. Waterman =

American judge

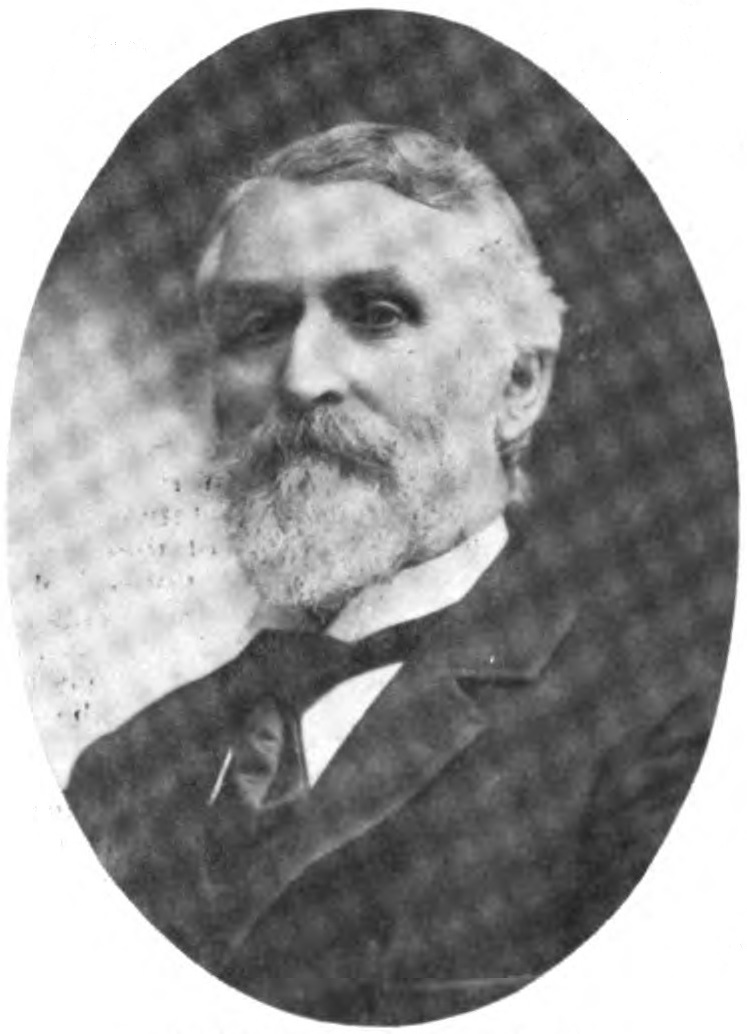
- from The Vermonter magazine. November 1906.

Chief Judge of the Vermont Superior Court
- In office 1917–1919
- Preceded by: Willard W. Miles
- Succeeded by: Zed S. Stanton

Judge of the Vermont Superior Court
- In office 1906–1919
- Preceded by: None (Position created)
- Succeeded by: Sherman R. Moulton

Member of the Vermont House of Representatives from Brattleboro
- In office 1900–1901
- Preceded by: Kittredge Haskins
- Succeeded by: James Conland

Judge of the Vermont Probate Court for the Marlboro District
- In office 1896–1906
- Preceded by: Royall Tyler Jr.
- Succeeded by: Anthony Franz Schwenk

President of the Vermont Bar Association
- In office 1896–1897
- Preceded by: Charles A. Prouty
- Succeeded by: Charles P. Hogan

Member of the Vermont State Senate from Windham County
- In office 1876–1878 Serving with Oscar E. Butterfield
- Preceded by: George Howe, A. A. Wyman
- Succeeded by: D. P. Webster, A. B. Franklin

State's Attorney of Windham County, Vermont
- In office 1872–1874
- Preceded by: Kittredge Haskins
- Succeeded by: Oscar E. Butterfield

Member of the Vermont House of Representatives from Wilmington
- In office 1867–1869
- Preceded by: Henry Whitney
- Succeeded by: Oscar E. Butterfield

Personal details
- Born: Eleazer Lee Waterman; July 25, 1839 Jamaica, Vermont
- Died: December 23, 1929 (aged 90) Brattleboro, Vermont
- Resting place: Morningside Cemetery; Brattleboro, Vermont
- Party: Republican
- Spouse: Jane E. Bemis (m. 1864-1929, his death)
- Children: 6
- Profession: Attorney

Eleazer Lee Waterman (July 25, 1839 - December 23, 1929) was a Vermont attorney, politician and judge. He was most notable for his service as a judge of the Vermont Superior Court (1906-1919) and as the court's chief judge (1917-1919).

A native of Jamaica, Vermont, Waterman graduated from Leland & Gray Seminary in Townshend, Vermont, studied law, and was admitted to the bar in 1863. He practiced in Wilmington before returning to Jamaica, and he later relocated to Brattleboro. A Republican, he served terms in the Vermont House of Representatives, Vermont Senate, and as State's Attorney of Windham County.

Waterman's judicial career began with election as a judge of Vermont's probate court, a position he held from 1896 to 1906. In 1906 he was appointed to a newly-created seat on the Vermont Superior Court, where he served until retiring in 1919. From 1917 until his retirement, Waterman was the court's chief judge.

In retirement, Waterman lived in Brattleboro. He died there on December 23, 1929, and was buried at Morningside Cemetery in Brattleboro.

== Early life ==
Eleazer L. Waterman was born in Jamaica, Vermont, on July 25, 1839, the son of Chandler and Polly (Thayer) Waterman. He was educated in the public schools of Jamaica and graduated from Leland & Gray Seminary in Townshend, Vermont. Waterman then studied law with the Jamaica firm of Butler and Wheeler; the firm's senior partner was the uncle of Judge Fred M. Butler, and the junior partner was Hoyt Henry Wheeler. Waterman was admitted to the bar in 1863.

== Start of career ==
Waterman began a law practice in Wilmington, Vermont, which he maintained until 1870. A Republican, he represented Wilmington in the Vermont House of Representatives in 1867 and 1868. Waterman moved back to Jamaica in 1870, and, in 1872, he was elected to a two-year term as State's Attorney of Windham County. In 1876, he was elected to represent Windham County in the Vermont Senate, and was selected to serve as chairman of the Senate's Judiciary Committee.

In 1886, Waterman relocated to Brattleboro, where he established a law firm in partnership with James Loren Martin and George B. Hitt. After Hitt's 1899 death, the firm continued as Waterman & Martin. This partnership continued until 1906, when Martin was appointed as Vermont's U.S. District Court Judge. Among the attorneys who studied law under Waterman and Martin were Ernest Willard Gibson and Herbert G. Barber.

Waterman developed a reputation as a skilled attorney of superior integrity, which resulted in his 1891 appointment as a special master to ascertain the facts in a highly publicized lawsuit involving the Vermont Copper Company.

Later that year, Waterman received an appointment from the United States Attorney General to take testimony and ascertain the facts of American Civil War claims against the federal government from residents of several southern and border states, including Mississippi, Arkansas, and Missouri.

== Later career ==
In 1896, Waterman was elected judge of the probate court for Windham County's Marlboro District, and he remained on the bench until 1906. From 1896 to 1897, Waterman served as president of the Vermont Bar Association. In 1896, the Central Vermont Railroad entered receivership. In 1899, Waterman was appointed as the special master to oversee its sale. The railroad was foreclosed on, and Waterman completed the transaction, after which the new owners reorganized the company as the Central Vermont Railway. In 1900, he was elected to the Vermont House as the representative from Brattleboro, and was chosen as chairman of the House Judiciary Committee. Waterman was long affiliated with the Jamaica Savings Bank and Brattleboro Savings Bank, including service as president of each.

In 1906, Waterman was appointed president of the Brattleboro and Whitehall Railroad, which had once been part of the Central Vermont system. Later in 1906, a reorganization of the state's courts created three new judgeships on the Vermont Superior Court. Though he was close to 70 years old, Waterman was a consensus choice among members of the Vermont General Assembly for one of the seats. Despite his advanced age, Waterman remained on the bench until 1919, when he declined reappointment and retired. From 1917 until 1919, Waterman was the Superior Court's Chief Judge. During his time on the Superior Court, Waterman was frequently called on to sit as an associate justice of the Vermont Supreme Court if other justices recused themselves or were otherwise unavailable.

== Retirement and death ==
In retirement, Waterman continued to reside in Brattleboro and declined frequent requests for his services, including invitations to carry out temporary assignments as a special master, referee, and mediator. He died in Brattleboro on December 23, 1929 and was buried at Morningside Cemetery in Brattleboro.

== Honors ==
In 1917, Waterman received the honorary degree of LL.D. from Middlebury College.

== Family ==
In 1864, Waterman married Jane E. Bemis (1840-1931) of Windham. They were the parents of six children: Hugh A.; Halbert Lee; Mabel J., the wife of Dr. Daniel P. Webster; Alice Maud; Ethel L., the wife of Charles A. Boyden; and Ernest J.

== Sources ==
=== Books ===
- Cabot, Mary Rogers (1922). Annals of Brattleboro, 1681-1895. Vol. II. Brattleboro, VT: E.L. Hildreth & Co.
- Child, Hamilton (1884). Gazetteer and Business Directory of Windham County, Vt., 1724-1884. Syracuse, NY: Syracuse Journal.
- Crockett, Walter Hill (1923). Vermont, the Green Mountain State. Vol. 5. New York, NY: Century History Company.
- Fifield, James Clark (1918). The American Bar: Contemporary Lawyers of the United States and Canada. Minneapolis, MN: James C. Fifield Company. p. 670.

=== Newspapers ===
- Orange County Chancery Court (March 13, 1891). "Legal Notice: Francis M. F. Cazin vs. Smith Ely, Vt. Copper Mining Company and others". Bradford, VT. The United Opinion – via Newspapers.com.
- "Chester: E. W. Gibson". Springfield Reporter. Springfield, VT. January 13, 1899 – via Newspapers.com.
- "E. L. Waterman President: Annual Meeting of Brattleboro & Whitehall Railroad Co". Bennington Banner. Bennington, VT. May 29, 1906 – via Newspapers.com.
- "E. L. Waterman, 90, Brattleboro, Dies". Rutland Herald. Rutland, VT. December 24, 1929 – via Newspapers.com.
- "Brattleboro Pays Judge Last Honors". Rutland Herald. Rutland, VT. December 27, 1929 – via Newspapers.com.
