= Justus Dartt =

American politician

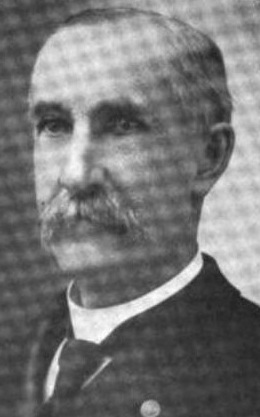
Justus Dartt, Vermont Senate President and Commissioner of Education

Justus Dartt (February 17, 1836 – July 1, 1912) was a Vermont farmer, educator, and politician who served as President of the Vermont State Senate and state Commissioner of Education.

== Biography ==
Justus Dartt was born in Weathersfield, Vermont on February 17, 1836. He was educated at Springfield Wesleyan Seminary and Newbury Seminary, afterward becoming a teacher and farmer in Wethersfield.

Dartt enlisted for the Civil War. He was commissioned a Second Lieutenant in Company D, 9th Vermont Infantry and served with the regiment during its entire term of service.

After the war Dartt resumed farming, teaching, and school administration in Wethersfield and served in several local offices. A Republican, Dartt served in the Vermont House of Representatives in 1874, 1878 and 1880.

In 1880 Dartt was appointed state Commissioner of Education, and he held the post until 1888. In 1882 he was elected to one term in the Vermont Senate, and he served as Senate President.

Dartt became a resident of Springfield in 1883. In 1902 Dartt was returned to the Vermont House of Representatives, serving two terms. In 1904 Dartt introduced a bill allowing women's suffrage, which nearly passed the House.

Dartt was again elected to the Vermont House in 1910.

Justus Dartt died in Springfield on July 1, 1912, and is buried in Springfield's Summer Hill Cemetery.

Political offices
Preceded by Philip K. Gleed	President pro tempore of the Vermont State Senate; 1882–1883	Succeeded by Laforrest H. Thompson
