= Laforrest H. Thompson =

American judge (1848–1900)

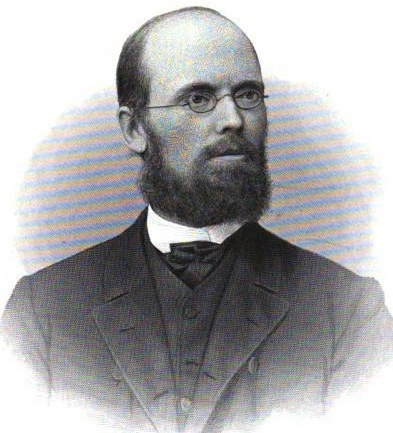
- From 1886's Biography of the Bar of Orleans County, Vermont

Associate Justice of the Vermont Supreme Court
- In office 1890–1900
- Preceded by: H. Henry Powers
- Succeeded by: Wendell Phillips Stafford

Member of the Vermont House of Representatives
- In office 1890–1890
- Preceded by: Homer H. Somers
- Succeeded by: John L. Dodge
- Constituency: Irasburg

President pro tempore of the Vermont Senate
- In office 1884–1886
- Preceded by: Justus Dartt
- Succeeded by: Henry C. Bates

Member of the Vermont Senate
- In office 1884–1886 Serving with Sydney B. Fletcher
- Preceded by: Walter Denison Crane
- Succeeded by: Wilbur Fisk Templeton
- Constituency: Orleans County

Member of the Vermont House of Representatives
- In office 1880–1884
- Preceded by: Zuar Eldridge Jameson
- Succeeded by: Elijah J. Powell
- Constituency: Irasburg

Probate Judge of Orleans County, Vermont
- In office 1876–1881
- Preceded by: Edward A. Stewart
- Succeeded by: Orlo H. Austin

State's Attorney of Orleans County, Vermont
- In office 1874–1876
- Preceded by: Walter D. Crane
- Succeeded by: William R. Rowell

Personal details
- Born: January 6, 1848 Bakersfield, Vermont, U.S.
- Died: June 22, 1900 (aged 52) Irasburg, Vermont, U.S.
- Resting place: Irasburg Cemetery, Irasburg, Vermont, U.S.
- Party: Republican
- Spouse(s): Mary Eliza Dutton (m. 1869); Helen C. Kinney (m. 1881)
- Children: 7 (including Frank D. Thompson)
- Education: Kimball Union Academy
- Profession: Attorney

Laforrest H. Thompson (January 6, 1848 – June 22, 1900) was a Vermont attorney and politician who served as President of the Vermont Senate and a Justice of the Vermont Supreme Court.

== Biography ==
Laforrest Holman Thompson was born in Bakersfield, Vermont, on January 6, 1848. He was educated at Kimball Union Academy, taught school while studying law, was admitted to the bar in 1871, and opened a practice in Irasburg.

A Republican, Thompson served as Orleans County State's Attorney from 1874 to 1876, and county Judge of Probate from 1876 to 1881.

In 1880 and 1882 Thompson was Irasburg's member of the Vermont House of Representatives. In 1884 Thompson was elected to the Vermont Senate. He served one term, 1884 to 1886, and was the Senate's President Pro Tem.

In 1890 Thompson was again elected to the Vermont House of Representatives. Later in 1890 he was appointed to the Vermont Supreme Court, on which he served until his death.

Thompson died in Irasburg on June 22, 1900. He is buried in Irasburg Cemetery, Plot 350, Row U 32a.

Thompson's son Frank D. Thompson also served on the Vermont Supreme Court. Frank Thompson was married to Mabel Miles, whose father Willard W. Miles was also an associate justice of the Vermont Supreme Court.

Political offices
Preceded by Justus Dartt	President pro tempore of the Vermont Senate; 1884 – 1886	Succeeded by Henry C. Bates
