= George M. Powers =

American judge (1861–1938)

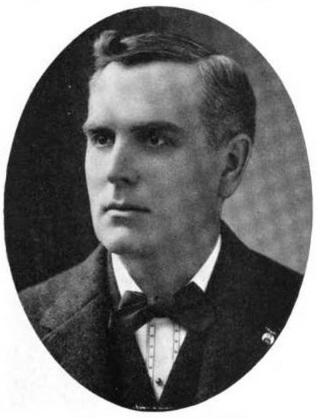
- From the June 1904 edition of The Vermonter magazine

Chief Justice of the Vermont Supreme Court
- In office 1929–1938
- Preceded by: John H. Watson
- Succeeded by: Sherman R. Moulton
- In office 1913–1915
- Preceded by: John W. Rowell
- Succeeded by: Loveland Munson

Associate Justice of the Vermont Supreme Court
- In office 1915–1929
- Preceded by: Leighton P. Slack
- Succeeded by: Frank D. Thompson
- In office 1909–1913
- Preceded by: None (position created)
- Succeeded by: William H. Taylor
- In office 1904–1906
- Preceded by: Wendell Phillips Stafford
- Succeeded by: None (position eliminated)

Judge of the Vermont Superior Court
- In office 1906–1909
- Preceded by: None (position created)
- Succeeded by: Fred M. Butler

State's Attorney of Lamoille County, Vermont
- In office 1888–1890
- Preceded by: Wallace H. Parker
- Succeeded by: Joel W. Page Jr.

Personal details
- Born: December 19, 1861 Hyde Park, Vermont, U.S.
- Died: June 24, 1938 (aged 76) Morrisville, Vermont, U.S.
- Resting place: Pleasant View Cemetery, Morrisville, Vermont, U.S.
- Party: Republican
- Spouse: Gertrude Woodbury (m. 1893)
- Children: 3
- Relatives: H. Henry Powers (father); Urban A. Woodbury (father in law)
- Education: University of Vermont (BA, MA)
- Profession: Attorney

George M. Powers (December 19, 1861 – June 24, 1938) was a Vermont attorney, politician, and judge. He was most notable for his service as an associate justice of the Vermont Supreme Court from 1904 to 1906, and again from 1909 to 1913, and chief justice from 1913 to 1915 and 1929 until his death.

== Early life ==
George McClellan Powers was born in Hyde Park, Vermont on December 19, 1861, the son of H. Henry Powers and Caroline (Waterman) Powers. Henry Powers was a prominent attorney who served as an associate justice of the Vermont Supreme Court and a member of the United States House of Representatives.

George Powers was raised in Morrisville, Vermont, and graduated from Peoples Academy. He served as a messenger for the Vermont Senate in 1872 and 1874. Powers received his Bachelor of Arts degree from the University of Vermont in 1883. In 1886, he received his Master of Arts degree from UVM. Powers studied law with his father and Philip K. Gleed, attained admission to the bar in 1886, and began to practice in Morrisville.

== Early career ==
A Republican, Powers was Assistant Clerk of the Vermont House of Representatives during the sessions of 1884, 1886, and 1888. From 1888 to 1890 he served as State's Attorney for Lamoille County. He served as Secretary of the Vermont Senate in 1890, 1892, and 1894. From 1902 to 1904 he was the Reporter of Decisions for the Vermont Supreme Court.

== Career as a judge ==
In 1904, Powers was appointed an associate justice of the Vermont Supreme Court, replacing Wendell Phillips Stafford, who had resigned in order to accept an appointment as a federal judge. Powers served until 1906, when his position was eliminated after a newly enacted law reduced the size of the court.

Powers served as a judge of the Vermont Superior Court from 1906 to 1909, when he was again appointed to the Supreme Court, and was succeeded on the Superior Court by Fred M. Butler. In 1909, he received the honorary degree of LL.D. from the University of Vermont. In 1913, Powers was appointed to succeed John W. Rowell as Chief Justice, and he served until 1915, when he was replaced by Loveland Munson.

Powers was re-appointed as an associate justice of the Vermont Supreme Court in 1915, and served until 1929, when he was again appointed Chief Justice following the death of John H. Watson. Powers served as chief justice until his death, and was succeeded by Sherman R. Moulton.

== Death and burial ==
Powers died in Morrisville on June 24, 1938. He was buried at Pleasant View Cemetery in Morrisville.

== Family ==
Powers was married to Gertrude Woodbury (1872–1962), the daughter of Governor Urban A. Woodbury. Their children included one son and two daughters; Horace Henry, Mildred Dorothy, and Elizabeth Lillian.

== Sources ==
=== Newspapers ===
- "Judge George M. Powers". Burlington Free Press. Burlington, VT. June 4, 1904 – via Newspapers.com.
- "H. Henry Powers Dies". Middlebury Register. Middlebury, VT. December 12, 1913 – via Newspapers.com.
- "Chief Justice Powers Died at Age of 76". Burlington Free Press. Burlington, VT. June 25, 1938 – via Newspapers.com.
- "Tribute Paid Chief Justice George Powers". Burlington Free Press. Burlington, VT. June 28, 1938 – via Newspapers.com.
- "Vermont Judge's Widow Succumbs". Orlando Sentinel. Orlando, FL. Associated Press. December 31, 1962 – via Newspapers.com.

=== Magazines ===
- Forbes, C. S. (June 1904). "Vermont Men of Today: George M. Powers". The Vermonter. St. Albans, VT: Charles S. Forbes.

=== Books ===
Dodge, Prentiss Cutler (1912). Encyclopedia of Vermont Biography. Burlington, VT: Ullery Publishing Company. p. 90.

- Marquis, Albert Nelson (1916). Who's Who in New England. Vol. 2. Chicago, IL: A. N. Marquis. p. 869.
- University of Vermont (1886). Catalogue of the University of Vermont. Burlington, VT: Burlington Free Press Association.
- University of Vermont (1905). The University of Vermont: The Centennial Anniversary of the Graduation of the First Class. Burlington, VT: Burlington Free Press.

=== Internet ===
- "Gertrude Woodbury Powers in the U.S. Social Security Applications and Claims Index, 1936-2007". Ancestry.com. Provo, UT: Ancestry.com, LLC.

Political offices
Preceded by Wendell Phillips Stafford	Associate Justice of the Vermont Supreme Court; 1904–1906	Succeeded by None (Position eliminated)
Preceded by None (Position created)	Associate Justice of the Vermont Supreme Court; 1909–1913	Succeeded by William H. Taylor
Preceded by John W. Rowell	Chief Justice of the Vermont Supreme Court; 1913–1915	Succeeded by Loveland Munson
Preceded by Loveland Munson	Associate Justice of the Vermont Supreme Court; 1915–1929	Succeeded by Frank D. Thompson
Preceded by John H. Watson	Chief Justice of the Vermont Supreme Court; 1929–1938	Succeeded by Sherman R. Moulton
