= John G. Sargent =

53rd U.S. Attorney General

John Sargent
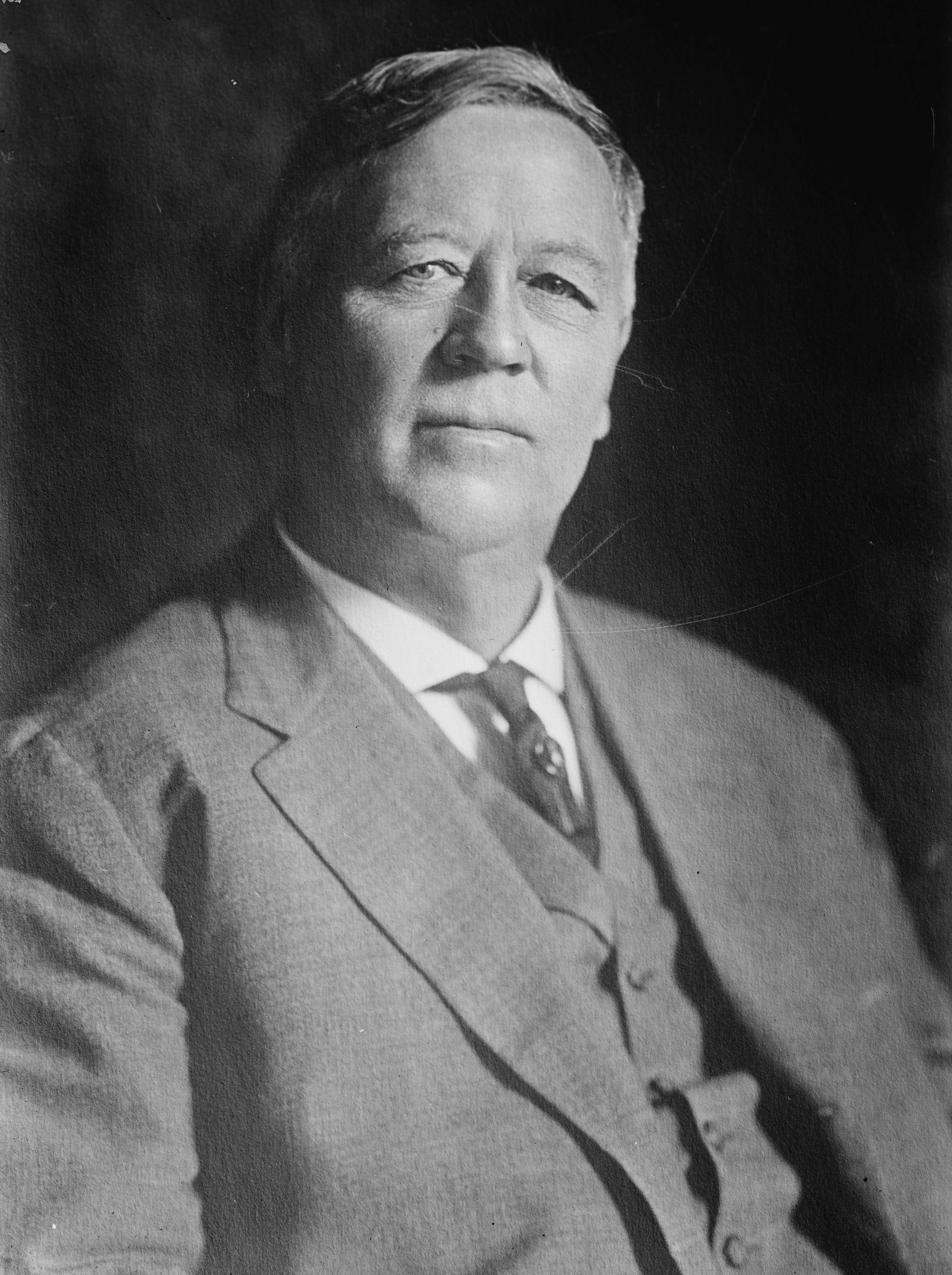

53rd United States Attorney General
- In office March 7, 1925 – March 4, 1929
- President: Calvin Coolidge
- Preceded by: Harlan Stone
- Succeeded by: William Mitchell

Attorney General of Vermont
- In office October 8, 1908 – October 3, 1912
- Governor: George H. Prouty; John A. Mead
- Preceded by: Clarke C. Fitts
- Succeeded by: Rufus E. Brown

Personal details
- Born: John Garibaldi Sargent; October 13, 1860 Ludlow, Vermont, U.S.
- Died: March 5, 1939 (aged 78) Ludlow, Vermont, U.S.
- Party: Republican
- Spouse: Mary Lorraine Gordon (m. 1887)
- Children: 1
- Education: Tufts University (BA)

John Garibaldi Sargent (October 13, 1860 – March 5, 1939) was an American lawyer and government official. He served as United States Attorney General during the administration of President Calvin Coolidge.

== Biography ==
John G. Sargent was born in Ludlow, Vermont on October 13, 1860, the son of John Henmon Sargent and Ann Eliza Hanley. He graduated from Black River Academy, and received his Bachelor of Arts degree from Tufts College in 1887. Sargent was married to the former Mary Lorraine Gordon on August 4, 1887. They had a daughter, Gladys Gordon Sargent.

Sargent studied law at a firm in Ludlow, was admitted to the bar in 1890, and became a partner in the firm of William W. Stickney, a cousin of Calvin Coolidge. Among the prospective attorneys who studied under Sargent and Stickney were Julius A. Willcox, who later served as an associate justice of the Vermont Supreme Court, and Joseph F. Radigan, who served as Vermont's United States Attorney from 1961 to 1969.

In addition to practicing law, Sargent was active in the insurance business, served as President of the Ludlow Savings Bank, and was a member of the board of directors of several railroads and other corporations.

A Republican, he served as Windsor County State's Attorney from 1898 to 1900. Sargent was Secretary of Civil and Military Affairs (chief assistant) for Stickney during Stickney's term as Governor of Vermont from 1900 to 1902.

From 1908 to 1912 Sargent was Vermont Attorney General. In 1912, Sargent received an honorary master's degree from Tufts.

In 1925, President Coolidge's nominee for Attorney General, Charles B. Warren, was rejected by the United States Senate. Coolidge then nominated Sargent, whom he had known since childhood. Sargent was confirmed unanimously, and served until March 4, 1929.

After leaving office, Sargent returned to practicing law; he brought into the firm as a partner Paul A. Chase, who had served as his special assistant while he was U.S. Attorney General. He was also Chairman of the Vermont Commission on Uniform State Laws, and a trustee of the Black River Academy.

Sargent died in Ludlow on March 5, 1939, and was buried at the Pleasant View Cemetery in Ludlow, Vermont.

John G. Sargent's honors included honorary LL.D. degrees from Tufts, Norwich University, Middlebury College, and Dartmouth College.

Party political offices
| Preceded by Clarke C. Fitts | Republican nominee for Vermont Attorney General; 1908, 1910 | Succeeded by Rufus E. Brown |
Legal offices
| Preceded by Harlan Fiske Stone | U.S. Attorney General; Served under: Calvin Coolidge; 1925–1929 | Succeeded by William DeWitt Mitchell |
| Preceded by Clarke C. Fitts | Vermont Attorney General; 1908-1912 | Succeeded by Rufus E. Brown |
