= Sherman R. Moulton =

American judge (1876–1949)

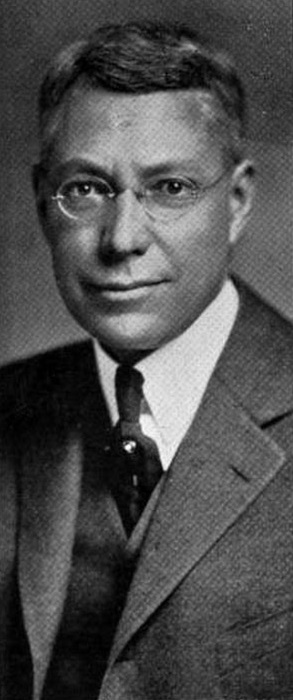
- From 1919's Vermont, Its Government by Walter J. Bigelow

Chief Justice of the Vermont Supreme Court
- In office July, 1938 – February, 1949
- Preceded by: George M. Powers
- Succeeded by: John C. Sherburne

Associate Justice of the Vermont Supreme Court
- In office October, 1926 – July, 1938
- Preceded by: Fred M. Butler
- Succeeded by: Olin M. Jeffords

Chief Judge of the Vermont Superior Court
- In office April, 1926 – October, 1926
- Preceded by: Frank L. Fish
- Succeeded by: Harrie B. Chase

Judge of the Vermont Superior Court
- In office February, 1919 – October, 1926
- Preceded by: Eleazer L. Waterman
- Succeeded by: John S. Buttles

Member of the Vermont Senate from Chittenden County
- In office January, 1919 – February, 1919 Serving with Frank Slater Jackson, Henry W. Tracy, Martin S. Vilas
- Preceded by: Donly C. Hawley, Heman Holmes Wheeler, Martin S. Vilas, Hamilton S. Peck
- Succeeded by: William B. McKillip

Personal details
- Born: June 10, 1876 New York City, New York
- Died: June 16, 1949 (aged 73) Burlington, Vermont
- Resting place: Moulton Cemetery; Randolph, Vermont
- Party: Republican
- Spouse: Stella Platt (m. 1906-1949, his death)
- Children: 1
- Education: Dartmouth College; Harvard Law School
- Occupation: Attorney; Judge

Sherman R. Moulton (June 10, 1876 – June 16, 1949) was a Vermont attorney and judge. He is most notable for his service as an associate justice of the Vermont Supreme Court (1926-1939) and as Chief Justice (1939-1949).

== Early life ==
Sherman Roberts Moulton was born in New York City on June 10, 1876, the son of Annie Jane Roberts and Clarence Freeman Moulton. He was raised in Randolph, Vermont, and graduated from Randolph High School. Moulton was an 1898 graduate of Dartmouth College, and in 1901 he received his LL.B. from Harvard Law School. He completed his legal training with attorney Joseph D. Denison of Randolph, and attained admission to the bar in October 1901.

== Start of career ==
Moulton was an attorney for the Rutland Railroad from 1902 to 1903, and then worked as an associate at the Townsend & Avery firm in New York City. In 1910, Moulton was one of the founding partners of Cowles, Moulton, & Stearns, a law firm located in Burlington, Vermont. He left the firm in 1912, and established a Burlington office in which he was the principal. Moulton was active in politics as a Republican; he was a member of the Burlington Republican Committee from 1910 to 1912, and was chairman beginning in 1911. From 1911 to 1913, and again from 1915 to 1916, he served as Burlington's grand juror, responsible for pursuing prosecutions in the city court.

== Continued career ==
From 1915 to 1917, Moulton was executive clerk and legal advisor to Governor Charles W. Gates. During World War I, Moulton served as a member of Vermont's Public Safety Committee, the body formed to coordinate the state government's wartime planning and actions. In 1918, Moulton was elected to the Vermont Senate, and he served in January, 1919. In addition, he served as reporter of decisions for the Vermont Supreme Court.

== Judicial career ==
In February, 1919, Moulton was appointed as a judge of the Vermont Superior Court, succeeding Eleazer L. Waterman. He served until 1926 and advanced through seniority to chief judge. In October 1926, he succeeded Fred M. Butler as an associate justice of the Vermont Supreme Court. In July 1938, Moulton was appointed as chief justice of the state Supreme Court, succeeding George M. Powers. He was succeeded as an associate justice by Olin M. Jeffords. Moulton served as chief justice until retiring in February 1949. He was succeeded as chief justice by associate justice John C. Sherburne.

== Death and burial ==
Moulton died in Burlington on June 16, 1949. He was buried at Moulton Cemetery in Randolph.

== Honors ==
Moulton received the honorary degree of LL.D. from Boston University in 1941, and an honorary D.C.L. from the University of Vermont in 1945.

== Family ==
In 1906, Moulton married Stella Platt (1880-1966) of Burlington. They were the parents of a son, Horace (1907-1991), who became a successful corporate attorney.

== Sources ==
=== Books ===
- Bigelow, Walter J. (1919). Vermont, Its Government. Montpelier, VT: Historical Publishing Company.
- Dodge, Prentiss Cutler (1912). Encyclopedia of Vermont Biography. Burlington, VT: Ullery Publishing Company. p. 272.
- Marquis, Albert N. (1948). Who's Who in America. Vol. 9–10. Chicago, IL: A. N. Marquis.

=== Newspapers ===
- "Moulton Elected Superior Judge". Burlington Free Press. Burlington, VT. January 30, 1919 – via Newspapers.com.
- "Moulton Now on Supreme Bench". Burlington Free Press. Burlington, VT. October 22, 1926 – via Newspapers.com.
- "Sherman R. Moulton Made Chief Justice". Burlington Free Press. Burlington, VT. July 9, 1938 – via Newspapers.com.
- "Olin M. Jeffords Elevated". Burlington Free Press. Burlington, VT. September 24, 1938 – via Newspapers.com.
- "Chief Justice Sherman Moulton Resigns After 22 Years on Supreme Court Bench". Burlington Free Press. Burlington, VT. February 25, 1949 – via Newspapers.com.
- "John C. Sherburne Elected Chief Justice of Vt". Burlington Free Press. Burlington, VT. April 2, 1949 – via Newspapers.com.
- "Former Chief Justice Moulton Dies Suddenly". Burlington Free Press. Burlington, VT. June 17, 1949 – via Newspapers.com.
- "Final Tribute Paid to leading Vt. Jurist". Burlington Free Press. Burlington, VT. June 20, 1949 – via Newspapers.com.
- "Funerals Arranged: Mrs. Stella P. Moulton". Burlington Free Press. Burlington, VT. August 5, 1966 – via Newspapers.com.
- "Horace P. Moulton, 83, Ex-A.T.& T. Counsel". New York Times. New York, NY. June 20, 1991.

Party political offices
Preceded by Charles D. Watson	Democratic nominee for Secretary of State of Vermont; 1906	Succeeded by James F. Higgins
Political offices
Preceded by Fred M. Butler	Associate Justice of the Vermont Supreme Court; 1926–1938	Succeeded by Olin M. Jeffords
Preceded by George M. Powers	Chief Justice of the Vermont Supreme Court; 1938–1949	Succeeded by John C. Sherburne
