= Stephen S. Cushing =

American judge (1884–1957)

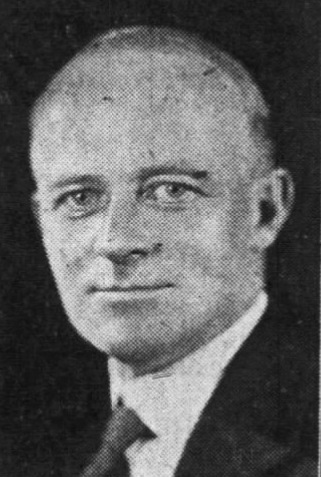
- Rutland Herald, January 15, 1937

Associate Justice of the Vermont Supreme Court
- In office 1952–1953
- Preceded by: Samuel H. Blackmer
- Succeeded by: Paul A. Chase

Chief Judge of the Superior Court
- In office 1949–1952
- Preceded by: Samuel H. Blackmer
- Succeeded by: Orrin B. Hughes

Judge of the Vermont Superior Court
- In office 1938–1952
- Preceded by: Samuel H. Blackmer
- Succeeded by: Orrin B. Hughes

Personal details
- Born: March 20, 1884 Nashua, New Hampshire, US
- Died: September 23, 1957 (aged 73) St. Albans, Vermont, US
- Resting place: Greenwood Cemetery, St. Albans, Vermont, US
- Party: Republican
- Spouse: Bessie Morton (m. 1912–1957)
- Children: 1
- Education: Dartmouth College; Middlebury College
- Profession: Attorney

Stephen S. Cushing (March 20, 1884 – September 23, 1957) was a Vermont attorney, businessman, judge, and politician. He was a veteran of World War I, and his most notable government service was as an associate justice of the Vermont Supreme Court from 1952 to 1953.

== Early life ==
Stephen Salisbury Cushing was born in Nashua, New Hampshire, on March 20, 1884, the son of George R. and Catherine (Moran) Cushing. He graduated from Laconia High School in 1902. Cushing then attended Dartmouth College, from which he graduated with a Bachelor of Science degree in 1906. After college, he moved to Vermont to teach school and study law, first with Alfred A. Hall, and then with Lee Stephen Tillotson. He was admitted to the bar in 1909, and practiced in Newport, Vermont, until 1910, when he relocated to St. Albans. He received a Master of Arts degree from Middlebury College in 1916.

== Early career ==
A Republican, Cushing served as City Attorney of St. Albans from 1912 to 1915, and State's Attorney of Franklin County from 1914 to 1916. He also served terms as a member of the St. Albans school board and the board's chairman, as well as a justice of the peace and a member of the city council. From 1912 to 1921, Cushing served as a clerk for the legislative revision staff of the Vermont General Assembly.

== Military service ==
Cushing was a longtime member of the Vermont National Guard. He enlisted in Company B, 1st Vermont Infantry Regiment in 1906, and he advanced to corporal before receiving his commission as a second lieutenant. After settling in St. Albans, he transferred his military membership to Company L. In the years prior to World War I, he advanced through the ranks to major, and served in positions including aide-de-camp to the adjutant general and judge advocate of the Vermont National Guard. Cushing served on active duty for the War Department as the U.S. Property and Disbursing Officer for Vermont and military aide to the governor, assisting to demobilize the National Guard following its Mexican border service during the Pancho Villa Expedition. During World War I, he joined the office of the Army's Provost Marshal General, and his responsibilities included implementation of the Selective Service Act of 1917. After the war he was one of the organizers of the American Legion in Vermont, and was a member of the Military Order of Foreign Wars and the Forty and Eight.

== Continued career ==
Cushing served on the staff of the Vermont General Assembly as legislative draftsman from 1921 to 1931. He was also active in several businesses, including managing the L. J. Morton store in St. Albans, and a vice president of the Franklin County Savings Bank and Trust Company and the St. Albans Cooperative Savings and Loan Association. In 1926, he received his qualification as a certified public accountant. From 1931 to 1932 he served on the Vermont Public Service Commission, and from 1932 to 1938 he was the commission's chairman. He received the honorary degree of LL.D. from Norwich University in 1934.

== Judicial career ==
In April 1938, Cushing was appointed a judge of the Vermont Superior Court. He advanced by seniority to become the chief judge in 1949, and he served on the court until 1952.

In January 1952, Cushing was appointed as an associate justice of the Vermont Supreme Court, filling the vacancy caused by the death of Samuel H. Blackmer. He remained on the court until June 1953, when he resigned because of ill health, and was succeeded by Paul A. Chase.

== Death and burial ==
He died in St. Albans on September 23, 1957. He was buried at Greenwood Cemetery in St. Albans.

== Family ==
In 1912, Cushing married Bessie Morton of St. Albans (1883–1961), the daughter of Leonard J. and Emma Morton. They were the parents of a son, Morton (1921–1963).

== Sources ==
=== Newspapers ===
- "Former Justice Stephen S. Cushing Dies In St. Albans Hospital at 73". The Burlington Free Press. Burlington, Vermont. September 24, 1957 – via Newspapers.com.
- "Obituary, Mrs. Bessie M. Cushing". The Burlington Free Press. Burlington, Vermont. October 3, 1961 – via Newspapers.com.
- "Morton Cushing of St. Albans Takes Own Life". The Burlington Free Press. Burlington, Vermont. January 22, 1963 – via Newspapers.com.

=== Books ===
- Cushing, John T.; Stone, Arthur F.; Sheldon, Harold P. (1928). Vermont in the World War: 1917–1919. Burlington, Vermont: Free Press Printing Company.
- State of Vermont (1918). Reports of State Officers, Departments and Institutions. Rutland, Vermont: The Tuttle Company.
- State of Vermont (1920). Reports of State Officers, Departments and Institutions. Rutland, Vermont: The Tuttle Company.
- Vermont General Assembly (1917). Journal of the Senate of the State of Vermont. Montpelier, Vermont: Capital City Press.
- Vermont Secretary of State (1917). Vermont Legislative Directory. Montpelier, Vermont: Vermont Secretary of State.
- Vermont Secretary of State (1937). Vermont Legislative Directory. Montpelier, Vermont: Vermont Secretary of State.

Political offices
Preceded by Samuel H. Blackmer	Justice of the Vermont Supreme Court; 1952–1953	Succeeded by Paul A. Chase
