= Wendell Phillips Stafford =

American judge

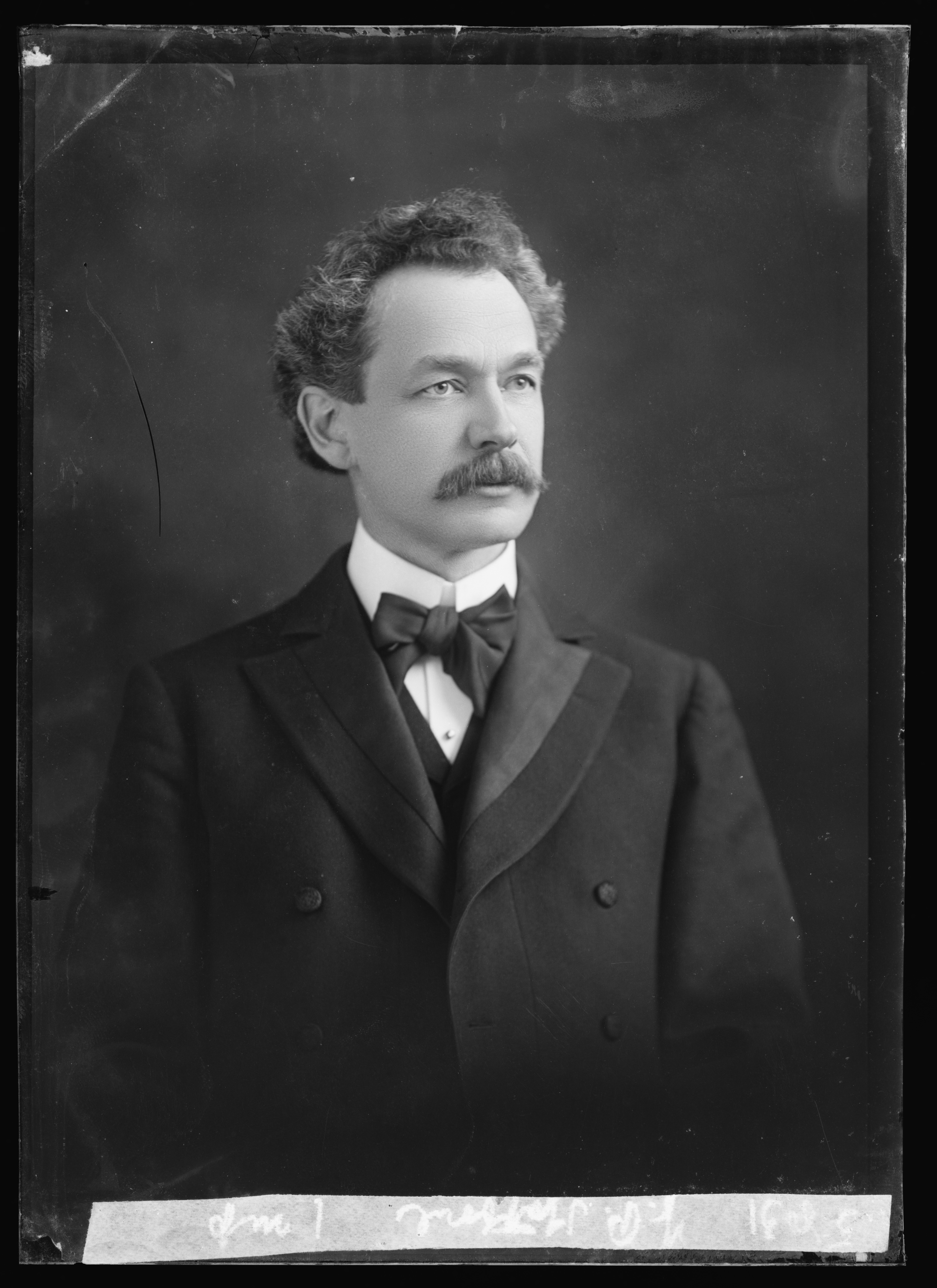
- Stafford c. 1905. C. M. Bell Collection, Library of Congress.

Associate Justice of the Supreme Court of the District of Columbia
- In office June 1, 1904 – May 4, 1931
- Appointed by: Theodore Roosevelt
- Preceded by: Jeter Connelly Pritchard
- Succeeded by: F. Dickinson Letts

Associate Justice of the Vermont Supreme Court
- In office 1900–1904
- Preceded by: Laforrest H. Thompson
- Succeeded by: George M. Powers

Member of the Vermont House of Representatives from St. Johnsbury
- In office 1892–1894
- Preceded by: Francis Walker
- Succeeded by: John Calvin Clark

Personal details
- Born: Wendell Phillips Stafford; May 1, 1861 Barre, Vermont, US
- Died: April 21, 1953 (aged 91) Washington, D.C.
- Resting place: Mount Pleasant Cemetery; St. Johnsbury, Vermont, US
- Party: Republican
- Spouse: Florence S. Goss (m. 1886–1949)
- Children: 2
- Education: Boston University School of Law (LL.B.)
- Profession: Attorney

Wendell Phillips Stafford (May 1, 1861 – April 21, 1953) was an American attorney and jurist. He was most notable for his service as an Associate Justice of the Vermont Supreme Court and as an Associate Justice of the Supreme Court of the District of Columbia.

== Early life and education ==
Born in Barre, Vermont, Stafford was the son of Franklin Stafford and Sarah (Noyes) Stafford. He attended the public schools of Barre and graduated from Barre Academy in 1878. Stafford graduated from St. Johnsbury Academy in 1880, and received a Bachelor of Laws from Boston University School of Law in 1883. He was admitted to the bar, and began to practice in St. Johnsbury, Vermont in partnership with Henry Clay Ide. Among the prospective attorneys who studied law in their office was William H. Taylor, who later served as an associate justice of the Vermont Supreme Court.

== Career ==
Stafford was a member of the Vermont House of Representatives in 1892. He was the Reporter of Decisions for the Supreme Court of Vermont from 1896 to 1900. He was an associate justice of the Vermont Supreme Court from 1900 to 1904, succeeding Laforrest H. Thompson. He resigned to accept appointment as a federal judge, and was succeeded by George M. Powers.

== Federal judicial service ==
Stafford received a recess appointment from President Theodore Roosevelt on June 1, 1904, to an Associate Justice seat on the Supreme Court of the District of Columbia (now the United States District Court for the District of Columbia) vacated by Associate Justice Jeter Connelly Pritchard. He was nominated to the same position by President Roosevelt on December 6, 1904. He was confirmed by the United States Senate on December 13, 1904, and received his commission the same day. His service terminated on May 4, 1931, due to his retirement. Stafford was active in Washington civic life, and one of the few white members of the local chapter of the NAACP. The Stafford, an apartment building in Washington, was named for Stafford by its builder, a friend and fellow Vermont native.

=== Other service ===
Stafford was a professor of law at Georgetown Law School and George Washington University. In 1901, Stafford received the honorary degree of Master of Arts from Dartmouth College. In 1907, he received an honorary LL.D. from Georgetown.

== Career as author ==
Stafford was also a poet, and his published works include: North Flowers (1902); Dorian Days (1909); and The Land We Love (1916).

== Death and burial ==
Stafford died at his home in Washington, D.C., on April 21, 1953. He was buried at Mount Pleasant Cemetery in St. Johnsbury.

== Family ==
In 1886, Stafford married Florence S. Goss of St. Johnsbury. They were the parents of two sons. Edward was a Washington, DC attorney and the husband of Marie Peary, daughter of Josephine Diebitsch Peary and Robert Peary. Robert Burns Stafford was born in 1894 and died in 1901.

Legal offices
Preceded by Jeter Connelly Pritchard	Associate Justice of the Supreme Court of the District of Columbia; 1904–1931	Succeeded by F. Dickinson Letts
