= Henry R. Start =

American judge

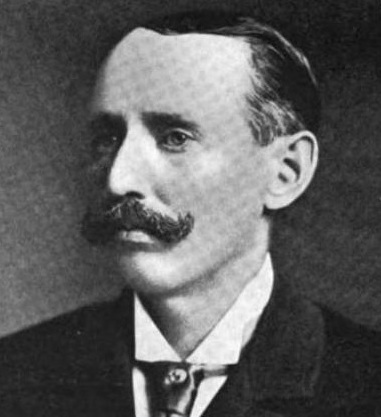

Associate Justice of the Vermont Supreme Court
- In office 1890–1905
- Preceded by: Homer E. Royce
- Succeeded by: Willard W. Miles

Speaker of the Vermont House of Representatives
- In office 1890–1890
- Preceded by: Josiah Grout
- Succeeded by: Hosea A. Mann Jr.

Member of the Vermont House of Representatives
- In office 1890–1890
- Preceded by: John A. Perkins
- Succeeded by: Oakley Brigham
- Constituency: Bakersfield

Member of the Vermont Senate
- In office 1880–1882 Serving with A. Wellington Woodworth, Alfred G. Safford
- Preceded by: Albert Sowles, E. Henry Powell, Chester K. Leach
- Succeeded by: Edward G. Greene, Daniel Moren, Horace Baxter
- Constituency: Franklin County

State's Attorney of Franklin County, Vermont
- In office 1876–1878
- Preceded by: George W. Newton
- Succeeded by: Charles P. Hogan

Personal details
- Born: December 28, 1845 Bakersfield, Vermont, U.S.
- Died: November 7, 1905 (aged 59) Bakersfield, Vermont, U.S.
- Resting place: Maple Grove Cemetery, Bakersfield, Vermont, U.S.
- Party: Republican
- Spouse: Ellen S. Houghton (m. 1869)
- Relations: Charles M. Start (brother)
- Children: 4
- Profession: Attorney

Military service
- Allegiance: United States (Union)
- Service: Union Army
- Years of service: 1865
- Rank: Private
- Unit: Company A, 3rd Vermont Volunteer Infantry Regiment
- Wars: American Civil War

Henry R. Start (December 28, 1845 – November 7, 1905) was a Vermont lawyer, judge, and politician who served as Speaker of the Vermont House of Representatives and an associate justice of the Vermont Supreme Court.

== Biography ==
Start was born in Bakersfield, Vermont, on December 28, 1845, the son of Simeon Gould and Mary Sophia (Barnes) Start. He attended Bakersfield and Barre Academies. His older brother Charles M. Start served as chief justice of the Minnesota Supreme Court.

He joined the Union Army in 1865, near the end of the Civil War, and served in Company A, 3rd Vermont Volunteer Infantry.

Discharged in July 1865, he returned to Franklin County and read law under M. R. Tyler. He was admitted to the bar in St. Albans in 1867. Start commenced practice in Bakersfield and formed a partnership, Cross & Start, with A. P. Cross of St. Albans.

A Republican, he served as State's Attorney for Franklin County from 1876 to 1878.

Start served in the Vermont Senate in 1880 and served on the Judiciary committee and as chairman of the joint standing committee on the reform school.

He was a Trustee of the Vermont Reform School from December 1880 to December 1888.

Start served as a presidential elector in the election of 1888, and cast his ballot for Benjamin Harrison.

In 1890 Start served in the Vermont House of Representatives. He was elected Speaker, but resigned after being elected an associate justice of the Vermont Supreme Court.

Start served on the court until his death. He died at his home in Bakersfield on November 7, 1905 and was buried in Bakersfield's Maple Grove Cemetery. He was succeeded on the Vermont Supreme Court by Willard W. Miles.

== Family ==
He was a Congregationalist. He married Ellen S. Houghton on June 10, 1869. Their children included Simeon Gould (b. 1870), Guy H. (b. 1873), Mabel (b. 1878), and Burdette (b. 1885).
