= James Loren Martin =

American judge

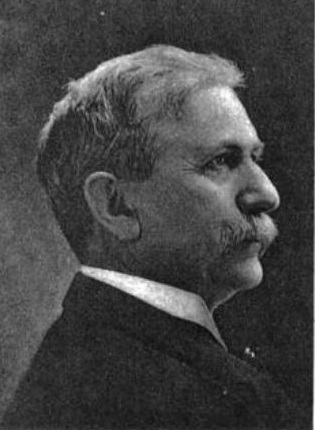
- From Volume 2 (1922) of Annals of Brattleboro, 1681-1895

Judge of the United States District Court for the District of Vermont
- In office October 20, 1906 – January 14, 1915
- Appointed by: Theodore Roosevelt
- Preceded by: Hoyt Henry Wheeler
- Succeeded by: Harland Bradley Howe

United States Attorney for the District of Vermont
- In office 1898–1906
- Appointed by: William McKinley
- Preceded by: John H. Senter
- Succeeded by: Alexander Dunnett

Member of the Vermont House of Representatives from Brattleboro
- In office 1892–1893
- Preceded by: Oscar A. Marshall
- Succeeded by: George A. Hines

Speaker of the Vermont House of Representatives
- In office 1878–1882
- Preceded by: John Wolcott Stewart
- Succeeded by: James K. Batchelder

Member of the Vermont House of Representatives from Londonderry
- In office 1874–1882
- Preceded by: Emery L. Harrington
- Succeeded by: Addison E. Cudworth

State's Attorney of Windham County, Vermont
- In office 1876–1877
- Preceded by: Oscar E. Butterfield
- Succeeded by: Edgar W. Stoddard

Personal details
- Born: September 13, 1846 Landgrove, Vermont
- Died: January 14, 1915 (aged 68) Montpelier, Vermont
- Resting place: Morningside Cemetery; Brattleboro, Vermont
- Party: Republican
- Spouse(s): Delia E. Howard (m. 1869-1881, her death); Jessie Lillie Dewey (m. 1884-1915, his death)
- Children: 6
- Education: Albany Law School (LL.B.)
- Profession: Attorney

James Loren Martin (September 13, 1846 – January 14, 1915) was an American lawyer, politician, and United States federal judge. The notable positions in which he served during his career included State's Attorney of Windham County, Vermont, Speaker of the Vermont House of Representatives, United States Attorney for the District of Vermont, and United States District Judge of the United States District Court for the District of Vermont.

== Early life ==
Martin was born in Landgrove, Vermont. The son of James and Lucy (Gray) Martin, he began paying for his own tuition at age 14 by working in a chair factory, producing maple sugar, and clearing land. His education included the schools of Landgrove and the academies of Londonderry, Vermont and Marlow, New Hampshire. He taught school in Londonderry and Winhall, Vermont, and studied law with Hoyt Henry Wheeler before attending Albany Law School, from which he graduated with a Bachelor of Laws in 1869. He practiced law, first in Londonderry, and later in Brattleboro, Vermont, where he purchased the practice of Charles N. Davenport.

== Career ==
A Republican, he was State's Attorney for Windham County, Vermont from 1876 to 1877. He served in the Vermont House of Representatives from 1874 to 1882 (from Londonderry) and 1892 (from Brattleboro). From 1878 to 1882, he was Speaker of the House.

Martin was state tax commissioner in 1888, 1890 to 1892, and 1894. He served as United States Attorney for the District of Vermont beginning in 1898, succeeding John H. Senter. He served until 1906, and was succeeded by Alexander Dunnett.

Martin was a longtime member of Brattleboro's school board, and served on the board of directors of several corporations, including Vermont Mutual Fire Insurance, American Fidelity Company, National Life Insurance Company, and the Holden & Martin lumber company.

== Federal judicial service ==
On October 20, 1906, Martin received a recess appointment to the United States District Court for the District of Vermont from President Theodore Roosevelt, filling the position vacated by Judge Hoyt Henry Wheeler. Formally nominated to the same position by President Roosevelt on December 3, 1906, he was confirmed by the United States Senate on December 11, 1906, and received his commission the same day.

== Death and burial ==
Martin remained on the court until his death. He died at the train station in Montpelier, Vermont after suffering a heart attack on January 14, 1915, aged 68. He was buried at Morningside Cemetery in Brattleboro.

== Honors ==
Martin received an honorary Master of Arts degree from Dartmouth College in 1882. In 1914, he received an honorary LL.D. from Middlebury College.

== Family ==
In 1869, Martin married Delia E. Howard, who died in 1881. They were the parents of three children—Jimmie (1873-1880), an unnamed son who was born and died in 1877, and Delia (1881-1882). In 1884, he married Jessie Lillie Dewey. They were the parents of three daughters—Margaret, Helen, and Katharine.

== Sources ==
=== Books ===
- Dodge, Prentiss Cutler (1912). Encyclopedia of Vermont Biography. Burlington, VT: Ullery Publishing Company.
- Fleetwood, Frederick G., Secretary of State (1902). Vermont Legislative Directory. Montpelier, VT: Vermont Watchman Co.

=== Newspapers ===
- "Judge J. L. Martin: Commission Signed by President Roosevelt Received Monday". Vermont Phoenix. Brattleboro, VT: Library of Congress. October 26, 1906 – via Chronicling America: Historic Newspapers.
- "John H. Senter Dropped Dead". Barre Daily Times. Barre, VT. January 21, 1916 – via Newspapers.com.
- "Funeral of Judge Martin". The Barre Daily Times. Barre, VT: Library of Congress. January 18, 1915 – via Chronicling America: Historic Newspapers.
- "Demise of Alexander Dunnett". The Evening Argus. Montpelier, VT. September 15, 1920 – via Newspapers.com.

=== Magazines ===
- "Death Notice, James L. Martin". Dartmouth Alumni Magazine. Vol. 7. Hanover, NH: Dartmouth College. 1915.

== External sources ==
- Catalogue of Officers and Students of Middlebury College, 1917
- General Catalogue of Dartmouth College and the Associated Schools 1769-1900, 1900

Political offices
Preceded by John Wolcott Stewart	Speaker of the Vermont House of Representatives; 1878–1884	Succeeded by James K. Batchelder
Legal offices
Preceded by John H. Senter	United States Attorney for the District of Vermont; 1896–1906	Succeeded by Alexander Dunnett
Preceded by Hoyt Henry Wheeler	Judge of the United States District Court for the District of Vermont; 1906–1915	Succeeded by Harland Bradley Howe
