= H. Henry Powers =

American judge

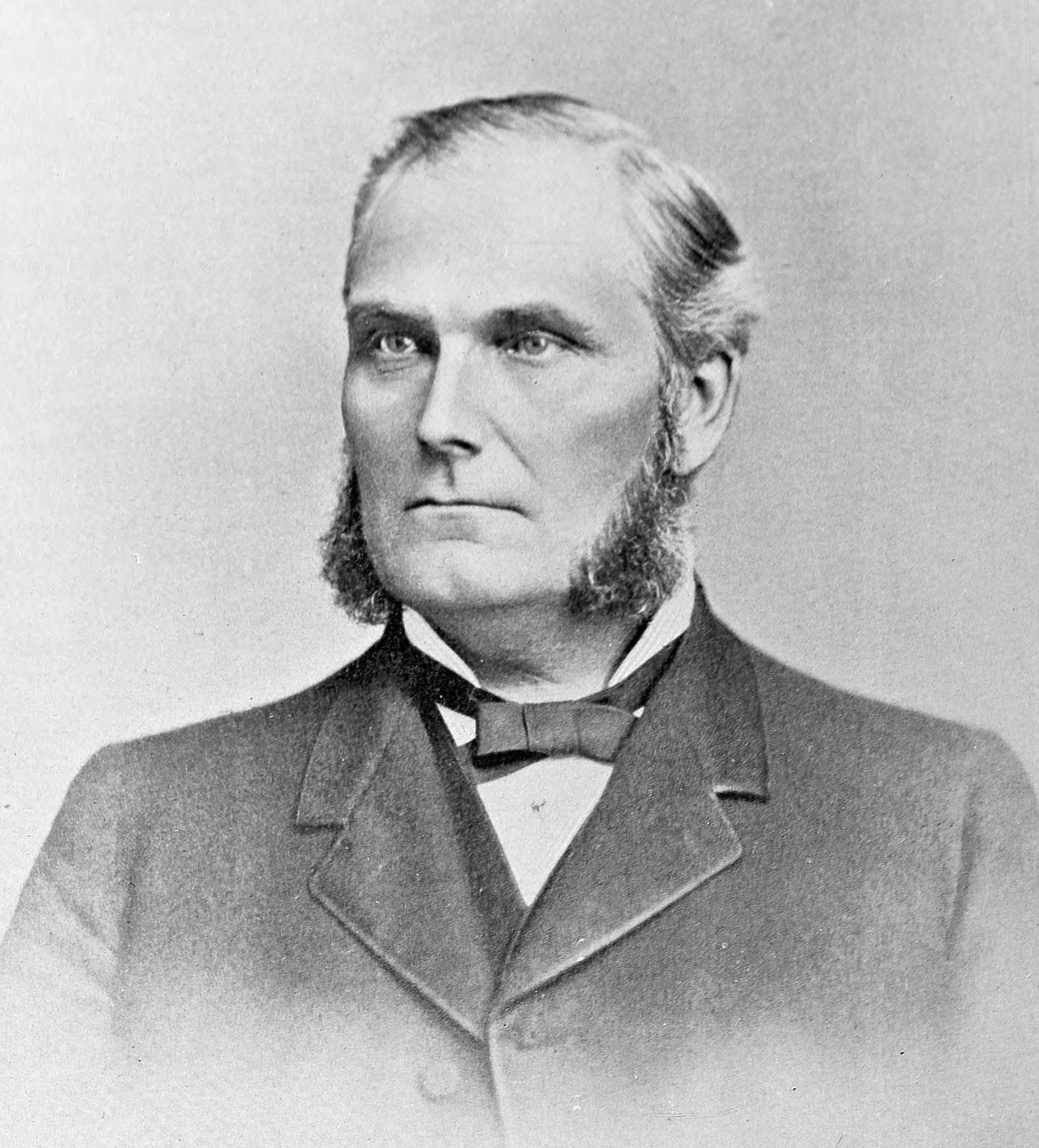

Member of the United States House of Representatives from Vermont's 1st district
- In office March 4, 1891 – March 3, 1901
- Preceded by: John Wolcott Stewart
- Succeeded by: David J. Foster

Associate Justice of the Vermont Supreme Court
- In office 1874–1890
- Preceded by: Asahel Peck
- Succeeded by: Laforrest H. Thompson

Speaker of the Vermont House of Representatives
- In office October 7, 1874 – November 24, 1874
- Preceded by: Franklin Fairbanks
- Succeeded by: Josiah Grout

Member of the Vermont House of Representatives from Morristown
- In office October 7, 1874 – November 24, 1874
- Preceded by: Rev. G. W. Bailey
- Succeeded by: Alden Darling

Member of the Vermont Senate from Lamoille County
- In office 1872–1874
- Preceded by: Asa R. Camp
- Succeeded by: Carroll S. Page

State's Attorney of Lamoille County, Vermont
- In office 1861–1862
- Preceded by: Reuben C. Benton
- Succeeded by: Philip K. Gleed

Member of the Vermont House of Representatives from Morristown
- In office 1858–1859
- Preceded by: Harrison Ferrin
- Succeeded by: Thomas Gleed

Personal details
- Born: May 29, 1835 Morristown, Vermont, U.S.
- Died: December 8, 1913 (aged 78) Morristown, Vermont
- Resting place: Pleasant View Cemetery, Morristown, Vermont
- Party: Republican
- Spouse: Caroline Waterman Powers
- Children: 2 (including George M. Powers)
- Education: University of Vermont
- Profession: Attorney

Horace Henry Powers (May 29, 1835 – December 8, 1913) was an American lawyer, judge and politician. He was most notable for his service as an Associate Justice of the Vermont Supreme Court and a U.S. Representative from Vermont (1891–1901).

A native of Morristown, Vermont, Powers received bachelor's (1855) and master's (1858) degrees from the University of Vermont, studied law, and became an attorney in Hyde Park before later returning to Morristown. Powers became active in politics as a Republican, and served in the Vermont House of Representatives (1858-1859), as State's Attorney of Lamoille County, Vermont (1861–1862), and the Vermont Senate (1872–1874). Powers returned to the Vermont House in 1874 and was elected to serve as Speaker of the House, but he resigned in order to accept appointment as an associate justice of the Vermont Supreme Court, where he served from 1874 to 1890.

In 1890, Powers was elected to the United States House of Representatives. He was reelected four times and served from March 4, 1891 to March 3, 1901. During his final three terms, Powers was chairman of the Committee on Pacific Railroads. He was an unsuccessful candidate for renomination in 1900, and resumed practicing law in Morristown.

Powers died in Morristown on December 8, 1913. He was buried at Pleasant View Cemetery in Morristown.

== Early life ==
H. Henry Powers was born in Morristown, Vermont on May 29, 1835, the son of Dr. Horace Powers and Love E. (Gilman) Powers. He graduated from Morristown's People's Academy and received a Bachelor of Arts degree from the University of Vermont (UVM) in 1855. Powers graduated Phi Beta Kappa from UVM and was initiated into Delta Psi. He earned his Master of Arts degree from UVM in 1858. Powers taught school in Huntingdon, Quebec and Hyde Park, Vermont, then studied law, first with Thomas Gleed of Morristown, and later with Child & Ferrin of the village of Hyde Park. He attained admission to the bar in 1858 and practiced first in Hyde Park, and later in Morristown.

== Start of career ==
He served as a member of the Vermont House of Representatives in 1858. Powers was the Lamoille County State's Attorney in 1861 and 1862. He served as a member of the council of censors in 1869, and was a member of the State constitutional convention in 1870.

Powers served in the Vermont State Senate in 1872 and 1873. In 1874, he was again a member of the Vermont House and served as Speaker.

Powers served as an associate justice of the Vermont Supreme Court from December 1874 to December 1890. He was a trustee of the University of Vermont from 1883 until his death. He was also a member of the Lamoille County Bank board of directors from 1888 until his death.

== U.S. Congressman ==
Powers was elected as a Republican to the Fifty-second United States Congress and to the four succeeding Congresses, serving from March 4, 1891 until March 3, 1901. He served as chairman of the Committee on Pacific Railroads from the Fifty-fourth through Fifty-sixth Congresses. Powers was a delegate to the 1892 Republican National Convention.

In 1896, Powers sponsored a controversial bill that would have allowed the Central Pacific Railroad to obtain a 75-year delay in paying off a 30-year-old debt to the government. The bill inspired a campaign of opposition led by publisher William Randolph Hearst and his employees, journalists Ambrose Bierce and Frank Norris. In one article about the Powers Bill, Bierce memorably wrote that while the handsome Powers might not be qualified to serve as chairman of the Pacific Railroads committee, he was certainly qualified to head the "Committee on Visible Virtues." In January, 1897 the Powers Bill was defeated 168 to 102.

Powers was an unsuccessful candidate for renomination in 1900. After leaving Congress, he resumed the practice of law in Morrisville, Vermont, and was chief counsel for the Rutland Railroad.

== Personal life ==
Powers married Caroline Waterman on October 11, 1858. They were the parents of two children, Carrie L. and George M. George M. Powers also served as the state's attorney of Lamoille County, Vermont, and an associate justice and chief justice of the Vermont Supreme Court. George Powers was the husband of Gertrude Francis Woodbury, whose father was Governor Urban A. Woodbury.

== Death and legacy ==
Powers died in Morristown on December 8, 1913. He was interred at Pleasant View Cemetery in Morristown. In 1896, Norwich University awarded Powers the honorary degree of LL.D. The Horace Henry Powers House in Morrisville is listed on the National Register of Historic Places.

U.S. House of Representatives
Preceded by John W. Stewart	Member of the U.S. House of Representatives from Vermont's 1st congressional district March 4, 1891 – March 3, 1901	Succeeded by David J. Foster
