= Ploof v. Putnam =

1908 American tort law case

- Court: Supreme Court of Vermont
- Full case name: Ploof v. Putnam
- Decided: October 2, 1908

Court membership
- Chief judge: John W. Rowell
- Associate judges: Loveland Munson, John H. Watson, Seneca Haselton, and George M. Powers

Ploof v. Putnam, 81 Vt. 471 (1908), was a case decided by the Vermont Supreme Court in 1908. The case touched on the defense of necessity in tort law and is studied throughout law schools in the United States.

== Background ==
The Ploofs were an indigent French Canadian family who lived and worked on a boat that traveled Lake Champlain. They earned a living transporting firewood and were well known among the communities near Lake Champlain, as they had been accused of stealing from vacation homes around the lake. Indeed, they had come to be known as the "pirates" of Lake Champlain.

In 1904, the Ploofs were sailing on Lake Champlain when a nor'easter struck, threatening to sink the boat and injure the Ploof family. To save the boat and his family from harm, Sylvester Ploof moored his boat to the dock at Henry Putnam's vacation home on Birch Island. After doing so, Putnam's caretaker, Albert Williams, unmoored the Ploof boat, allowing it to be dashed against the shore, destroying the boat and its contents. The Ploof family was injured, too. Ploof sued Putnam for his servant's actions.

== Decision ==
Loveland Munson wrote for the majority. He reasoned that, in general, "necessity...will justify entries upon land and interference with personal property that would otherwise have been trespasses." Munson emphasized that necessity applies with extra force when human life is at stake. He determined that, given the emergency of the nor'easter, Ploof did not have a duty to find somewhere else to moor, even if it would have been safe to do so. Finally, the Court concluded that Putnam could be held liable for his servant's actions under respondeat superior.

== Aftermath ==
In the subsequent trial in 1909, Ploof won and was awarded $650 in damages. Putnam brought two more appeals to the Vermont Supreme Court before Ploof could collect the judgment. Despite the win, the Ploofs' lives remained largely the same as before. They purchased another boat and continued to live and work on Lake Champlain. They continued living in shanties on the shore occasionally and had run-ins with the law. Because of their disfavored status, they were targeted by the Eugenics Survey of Vermont. Sylvester Ploof died in 1922.

The case was "essentially just a local annoyance for [Putnam]," who was very wealthy. He died in 1938, leaving an estate worth approximately $16,500,000.
