= Senator Munson =

Senator Munson may refer to:

- Dave Munson (born 1942), South Dakota State Senate
- Donald F. Munson (born 1937), Maryland State Senate
- Loveland Munson (1843–1921), Vermont State Senate
- Oliver Munson (1856–1933), Wisconsin State Senate
