= Elliot M. Sutton =

American politician from Vermont (1841–1908)

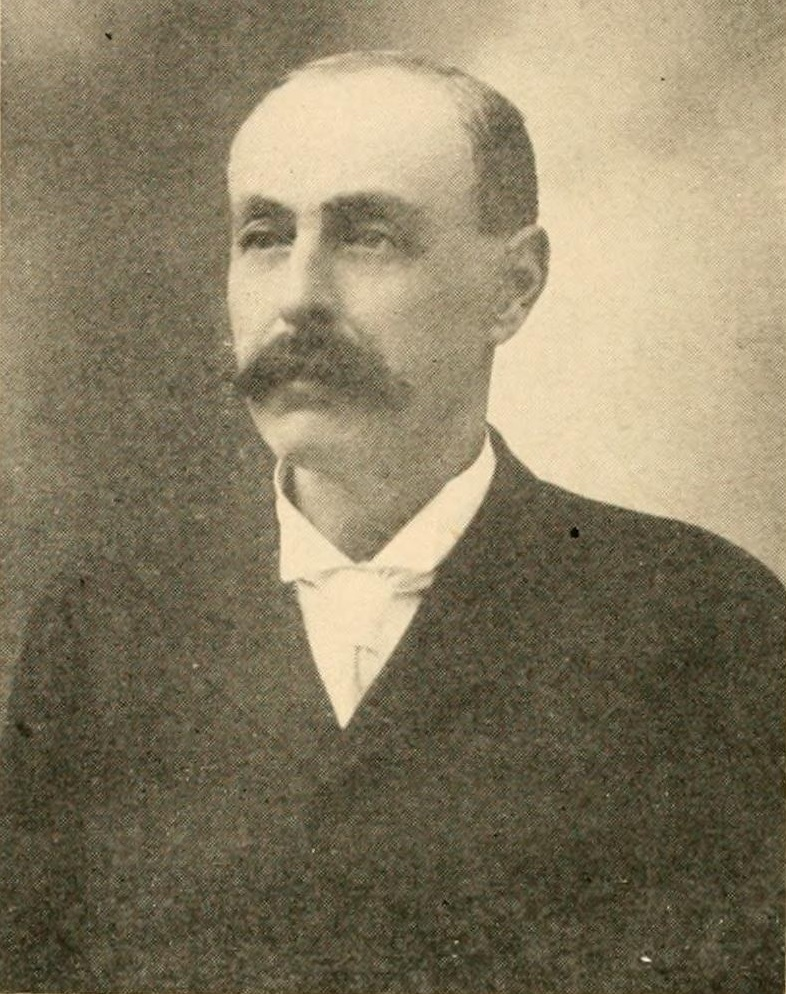
- From 1903's Vermont, A Souvenir of its Government, 1902-1903

Member of the Vermont Senate from Chittenden County
- In office October 1, 1902 – October 5, 1904 Serving with Chauncey W. Brownell, Charles J. Russell
- Preceded by: William H. H. Varney, Rufus E. Brown, William J. Fuller
- Succeeded by: Calvin S. Isham, Charles S. Ashley

Mayor of Burlington, Vermont
- In office April 4, 1898 – April 3, 1899
- Preceded by: Hamilton S. Peck
- Succeeded by: Robert Roberts

President of the Burlington, Vermont Board of Aldermen
- In office April 4, 1887 – April 2, 1888
- Preceded by: E. J. Booth
- Succeeded by: E. J. Booth

Member of the Burlington, Vermont Board of Aldermen
- In office April 5, 1886 – April 2, 1888
- Preceded by: J. W. Goodell
- Succeeded by: J. W. Goodell
- Constituency: Ward 5
- In office April 6, 1874 – April 3, 1876
- Preceded by: G. S. Appleton (from South Ward)
- Succeeded by: E. R. Hard
- Constituency: Ward 5

Personal details
- Born: October 13, 1841 Oxford, Connecticut
- Died: March 5, 1908 (aged 66) Johnson, Vermont
- Resting place: Lakeview Cemetery, Burlington, Vermont
- Party: Democratic
- Spouse(s): Martha O'Brien (m. 1863-1884, div.); Hattie L. (Ballou) Hurlburt (m. 1886-1907, div.)
- Children: 1
- Profession: Businessman

Elliot M. Sutton (October 13, 1841 – March 5, 1908) was a Vermont businessman and politician. A Democrat, among the offices in which he served was mayor of Burlington (1898-1899) and member of the Vermont Senate (1902-1904).

== Early life ==
Elliot M. Sutton (sometimes spelled "Elliott" and frequently abbreviated E. M. Sutton) was born in Oxford, Connecticut, on October 13, 1841. His family moved to Burlington, Vermont in 1850, and Sutton was educated in the public schools of Burlington and Burlington High School.

Sutton was working as a photographer when he registered for the Union Army draft during the American Civil War. (Note: Obituaries and some other biographical sources indicate that Sutton served in the Union Army, but provide no pertinent details. A thorough search of relevant sources shows his name is not included in muster rolls, payrolls, pension records, or any other Civil War-era military documents.) In 1864, he moved to South Carolina, where he purchased a plantation and lived for a year.

By 1865, Sutton had returned to Burlington, where he owned and operated a restaurant, the City Coffee House. He was later involved in several other business ventures, including owning apartments and commercial buildings, working as a real estate broker, and operating a lumber dealership. He also took part in civic activities, including joining the volunteer fire department's Hook and Ladder Company Number 1, of which he served as auditor. Sutton later sponsored another fire company, which was christened E. M. Sutton Hose Company in his honor.

== Anti-prohibition activist ==
Sutton was both a supporter of the Temperance movement and an opponent of Prohibition. He was investigated on several occasions for violating Vermont's law prohibiting the sale and consumption of alcohol. In August 1867, the city constable searched his home and confiscated three pints of whiskey. Sutton defended himself in a trial before the city recorder and won a dismissal of the charges and return of his liquor.

In January 1869, he was found guilty on four counts of selling liquor at the City Coffee House, and paid an $80 fine. In February 1869, he was convicted of one count, and fined $20. In May 1869, he was again charged for violating the law, and the charges were dismissed. In October 1869, he once again faced charges for selling alcohol at his restaurant. He pleaded guilty and was fined $20.

In August 1873, law enforcement officers searched his home in the early morning hours and discovered a workman leaving the premises with two jugs of liquor. Upon entering Sutton's basement, they found him packing bottles of whiskey for transport and observed him emptying a washtub and another container. Police seized bottles and other supplies and equipment. In January 1874, police again searched Sutton's home, but found nothing incriminating.

In 1882, Sutton paid a $50 fine after pleading guilty to five counts of illegally selling liquor. In 1889, a search of his barn uncovered a secret tunnel with a concealed entrance in the cellar, which led to a hidden storage room. Authorities discovered several containers of high wines, as well as bottles, coloring, flavoring, and other ingredients, all of which they seized. As Vermont began to market itself as a tourist destination, the prohibition on alcohol sales was subject to lax enforcement. For example, by the 1890s Urban A. Woodbury, the owner of Burlington's Van Ness House hotel, was openly serving alcohol.

== Political career ==
=== Early activity ===
Sutton developed an interest in worker's rights. He was a member of Burlington's first Workingmen's Union, and served as its president. In September 1867 he was appointed to a committee that attempted to enlarge the organization, first to the rest of Chittenden County, and then statewide.

In the 1860s, Sutton became active in local politics and government as a Democrat, and took part in several of the party's local and state nominating caucuses and conventions. He also served for several years as chairman of the Burlington and Chittenden County Democratic Committees.

In 1874, Sutton was nominated for alderman from Burlington's fifth ward. He won the March election with 212 votes to 170 for Republican candidate S. M. Pope. He was nominated for reelection to a two-year term in 1876. In the general election, Republican E. R. Hard won with 205 votes to 202 for Sutton. He ran again in 1877, and was defeated by Archibald Taylor, 217 to 183.

In 1884, Sutton was again a candidate for alderman, and lost to Republican J. W. Goodell, 235 to 214. In March 1886, he was elected again to the board of aldermen, receiving 292 votes to 191 for J. W. Goodell. In September 1886, Sutton was an unsuccessful candidate for the Vermont Senate, placing fourth in the race for three at-large seats.

In March 1887, Sutton was an unsuccessful candidate for mayor, losing to Republican William W. Henry by a vote of 1084 to 769. In April 1887, he was elected president of the board of aldermen. He completed his term as alderman and board president in April 1888. In 1890, Sutton was the Democratic nominee for mayor and lost to William A. Crombie, 1041 votes to 817. In April 1893, the board of aldermen elected Sutton as street commissioner and he served until May 1896.

In June 1893, Sutton was appointed as U.S. Inspector of Chinese Immigration for Vermont, a position created as part of the Geary Act. He succeeded John Halstead and was based in Richford, near the Canadian border. He served until June 1897, when the position was discontinued.

=== Mayor of Burlington ===
Sutton was the Democratic nominee for mayor in March 1898, and defeated Republican Hamilton S. Peck by a vote of 1351 to 1312. His term was marked by a contentious relationship with Burlington's Republicans, who opposed many of his initiatives, including suing to prevent the police chief Sutton appointed from assuming his duties. Sutton's appointment was overturned and the previous chief resumed serving. In March 1899, Sutton was defeated for reelection by Republican Robert Roberts, 1491 to 1464.

Later in 1899, Sutton spoke publicly in opposition to the court decision concerning the chief of police, and was indicted for defaming the Vermont Supreme Court. His appeals against the indictment were overruled in 1901 and the case was remanded for trial. Motions and appeals kept the case active until March 1904, when the State's Attorney of Washington County declined to prosecute and the charge was dismissed.

=== State Senate ===
In 1902, Sutton was one of the Democratic nominees for Chittenden County's three at-large seats in the Vermont Senate. In the September general election, Democrats in Chittenden County were aided by the anti-establishment Republican supporters of Percival W. Clement and succeeded in electing Sutton, who was the third-place finisher. He served one term, October 1902 to October 1904. Sutton was a member of the committees on elections and railroads, and chairman of the committee on printing. He was not a candidate for reelection.

== Death and burial ==
In the last three years of his life, Sutton was often in ill health and was cared for by his daughter. He died at her home in Johnson, Vermont on March 5, 1908. Sutton was buried at Lakeview Cemetery in Burlington.

== Family ==
In 1863, he married Martha O'Brien of Burlington. Sutton paid a $7 fine in early 1882 after pleading guilty to assaulting her. She sued for divorce on the grounds of intolerable cruelty, won her case in late 1882 and received both a divorce and the right to resume using her maiden name. In 1886, Sutton married Hattie L. (Ballou) Hurlburt of Worcester, Massachusetts. They were married until September 1907, when Elliot Sutton obtained a divorce on the grounds of desertion.

In January 1884, Sutton had a daughter, Inez, with Alice Guyette. Inez May Sutton (1884-1916) graduated from Edmunds High School in 1902 and became a teacher. In 1905, she married Dr. Lyndhurst P. Holcomb of Johnson. They were the parents of a son, Harold (1906-1976).

== Sources ==
=== Newspapers ===
- "The Department of the South". Burlington Free Press. Burlington, VT. March 11, 1864. p. 2 – via Newspapers.com.
- "Proceedings of the City Council". Burlington Daily Times. Burlington, VT. November 28, 1865. p. 4 – via Newspapers.com.
- "City Coffee House". Burlington Daily Times. Burlington, VT. January 19, 1866. p. 4 – via Newspapers.com.
- "Every Man His Own Lawyer". Burlington Times. Burlington, VT. August 24, 1867. p. 1 – via Newspapers.com.
- "Workingmen's Union Working Committee". Burlington Times. Burlington, VT. September 21, 1867. p. 2 – via Newspapers.com.
- "Workingmen's Union". Burlington Sentinel. Burlington, VT. August 14, 1868. p. 3 – via Newspapers.com.
- "City Court: E. M. Sutton". Burlington Free Press. Burlington, VT. January 22, 1869. p. 3 – via Newspapers.com.
- "Justice Court: E. M. Sutton". Burlington Free Press. Burlington, VT. February 19, 1869. p. 3 – via Newspapers.com.
- "Choosing Delegates to the Temperance Convention". Burlington Free Press. Burlington, VT. February 25, 1869. p. 3 – via Newspapers.com.
- "Before Judge Shaw". Burlington Free Press. Burlington, VT. May 4, 1869. p. 3 – via Newspapers.com.
- "The Democrats of Chittenden County". Burlington Free Press. Burlington, VT. June 30, 1869. p. 3 – via Newspapers.com.
- "Chittenden County Court: Elliot M. Sutton". Burlington Free Press. Burlington, VT. October 4, 1869. p. 3 – via Newspapers.com.
- "Democratic Convention". Argus and Patriot. Montpelier, VT. June 23, 1870. p. 3 – via Newspapers.com.
- "Building -- E. M. Sutton". Burlington Free Press. Burlington, VT. October 8, 1870. p. 3 – via Newspapers.com.
- "Hook and Ladder Company". Burlington Free Press. Burlington, VT. January 3, 1872. p. 3 – via Newspapers.com.
- "The Liquor Law". Burlington Free Press. Burlington, VT. August 12, 1873. p. 3 – via Newspapers.com.
- "Search was Made". Burlington Free Press. Burlington, VT. January 13, 1874. p. 3 – via Newspapers.com.
- "Lawrence Barnes for Mayor". Rutland Daily Globe. Rutland, VT. February 27, 1874. p. 3 – via Newspapers.com.
- "City Elections: The Results for Alderman". Burlington Free Press. Burlington, VT. March 4, 1874. p. 3 – via Newspapers.com.
- "Democratic Caucus". Burlington Free Press. Burlington, VT. June 20, 1874. p. 3 – via Newspapers.com.
- "Democratic City Nominations". Burlington Sentinel. Burlington, VT. February 23, 1876. p. 3 – via Newspapers.com.
- "City Election: Sweeping Republican Victory". Burlington Free Press. Burlington, VT. March 8, 1876. p. 3 – via Newspapers.com.
- "The Firemen's Parade". Burlington Free Press. Burlington, VT. October 6, 1876. p. 3 – via Newspapers.com.
- "City Election: Ward Five". Burlington Free Press. Burlington, VT. March 6, 1877. p. 3 – via Newspapers.com.
- "Come to Grief". Burlington Free Press. Burlington, VT. March 29, 1882. p. 3 – via Newspapers.com.
- "Domestic Secular News: E. M. Sutton". Vermont Chronicle. Bellows Falls, VT. April 7, 1882. p. 3 – via Newspapers.com.
- "Chittenden County Court: Sutton vs. Sutton". Burlington Free Press. Burlington, VT. October 5, 1882. p. 3 – via Newspapers.com.
- "Our City Election was the Most Lively We Have had in Some Years". Burlington Clipper. Burlington, VT. March 6, 1884. p. 3 – via Newspapers.com.
- "Marriages: E. M. Sutton and Hattie L. Hurlburt". The Rural Vermonter. Montpelier, VT. May 28, 1886. p. 3 – via Newspapers.com.
- "Our City Election". Burlington Free Press. Burlington, VT. March 3, 1886. p. 1 – via Newspapers.com.
- "Chittenden County Democratic Town Committees". Burlington Independent. Burlington, VT. August 6, 1886. p. 1 – via Newspapers.com.
- "The Vote for State Senators". Burlington Clipper. Burlington, VT. September 23, 1886. p. 3 – via Newspapers.com.
- "Burlington's New City Government". St. Albans Messenger. St. Albans, VT. April 5, 1887. p. 2 – via Newspapers.com.
- "The City Government". Burlington Free Press. Burlington, VT. April 3, 1888. p. 1 – via Newspapers.com.
- "Chittenden County Democratic Convention". Burlington Independent. Burlington, VT. July 6, 1888. p. 5 – via Newspapers.com.
- "Found at Last: E. M. Sutton's Hiden Cellar Discovered". Burlington Free Press. Burlington, VT. March 29, 1889. p. 4 – via Newspapers.com.
- "City Election". Burlington Independent. Burlington, VT. March 7, 1890. p. 5 – via Newspapers.com.
- "Election of City Officials: E. M. Sutton". Burlington Free Press. Burlington, VT. April 4, 1893. p. 5 – via Newspapers.com.
- "E. M. Sutton Appointed Commissioner of Immigration". Burlington Free Press. Burlington, VT. June 9, 1893. p. 5 – via Newspapers.com.
- "Personal Mention: E. M. Sutton". Burlington Free Press. Burlington, VT. May 2, 1896. p. 5 – via Newspapers.com.
- "General Vermont News: E. M. Sutton". The Vermont Sun. St. Albans, VT. June 5, 1897. p. 2 – via Newspapers.com.
- "Sutton Triumphant". Burlington Free Press. Burlington, VT. March 2, 1898. p. 5 – via Newspapers.com.
- "Smith Gets the Decision". Barre Evening Telegram. Barre, VT. January 26, 1899. p. 4 – via Newspapers.com.
- "City Elections". The Chelsea Herald. Randolph, VT. March 9, 1899. p. 1 – via Newspapers.com.
- "Indictment of Ex-Mayor Sutton by Washington County Grand Jury". Burlington Free Press. Burlington, VT. October 10, 1899. p. 5 – via Newspapers.com.
- "Case of E. M. Sutton was Remanded for Trial". Montpelier Evening Argus. Montpelier, VT. November 27, 1901. p. 4 – via Newspapers.com.
- "Fusion in Burlington". The Boston Globe. Boston, MA. September 3, 1902. p. 2 – via Newspapers.com.
- "The County Ticket (1902)". Burlington Free Press. Burlington, VT. September 5, 1902. p. 2 – via Newspapers.com.
- "Case Against E. M. Sutton Nol Prossed". Burlington Free Press. Burlington, VT. March 3, 1904. p. 2 – via Newspapers.com.
- "The County Ticket". Burlington Free Press. Burlington, VT. September 8, 1904. p. 1 – via Newspapers.com.
- "Divorce E. M. Sutton". Burlington Daily News. Burlington, VT. September 29, 1907. p. 6 – via Newspapers.com.
- "Death of E. M. Sutton". Burlington Daily News. Burlington, VT. March 5, 1908. p. 1 – via Newspapers.com.
- "The Late E. M. Sutton". Burlington Daily News. Burlington, VT. March 9, 1908. p. 6 – via Newspapers.com.
- "Death or Mrs. L. P. Holcomb". Morrisville Messenger. Morrisville, VT. May 3, 1916. p. 4 – via Newspapers.com.
- "Obituary, Howard Elliott Holcomb". Burlington Free Press. Burlington, VT. August 19, 1976. p. 2B – via Newspapers.com.

=== Internet ===
- "Vermont Vital Records, 1720-1908, Marriage Entry for Elliot M. Sutton and Martha O'Brien". Ancestry.com. Lehi, UT: Ancestry.com, LLC. May 7, 1863.
- "U.S. Civil War Draft Registrations Records, 1863-1865, Entry for Elliot M. Sutton". Ancestry.com. Lehi, UT: Ancestry.com, LLC. May 31, 1863.
- "Vermont Vital Records, 1720-1908, Marriage Entry for Inez M. Sutton and Lyndhurst P. Holcomb". Ancestry.com. Lehi, UT: Ancestry.com, LLC. May 27, 1905.
- Vermont State Archives & Records Administration. "1903: Regulating the Traffic in Intoxicating Liquor". sos.vermont.gov. Montpelier, VT: Vermont Secretary of State.

=== Books ===
- Manual of the Legislature of Vermont. Montpelier, VT: Vermont Secretary of State. 1902 – via Internet Archive.
