= Charles H. Heath =

American politician (1829–1889)

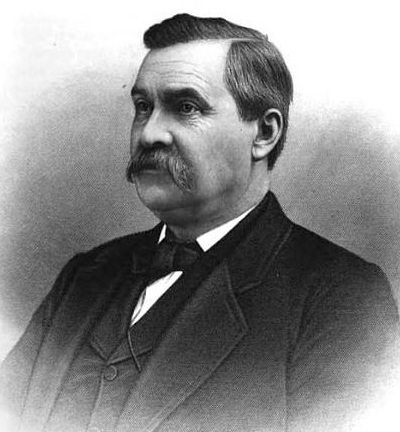
- From 1889's Gazetteer of Washington County, Vt., 1783-1889

President pro tempore of the Vermont Senate
- In office 1870–1872
- Preceded by: George N. Dale
- Succeeded by: Lyman G. Hinckley

Member of the Vermont Senate from Washington County
- In office 1868–1872 Serving with Jasper H. Orcutt, Charles Dewey (1868); Charles Dewey, Jonathan H. Hastings (1869); Jonathan H. Hastings, Heman Carpenter (1870–1872)
- Preceded by: William W. Henry, Jasper H. Orcutt, Charles Dewey
- Succeeded by: Heman Carpenter, Clark King

State's Attorney of Washington County, Vermont
- In office 1862–1864
- Preceded by: Homer W. Heaton
- Succeeded by: Heman Carpenter

Personal details
- Born: November 4, 1829 Woodbury, Vermont, U.S.
- Died: July 12, 1889 (aged 59) Barre, Vermont, U.S.
- Resting place: Green Mount Cemetery, Montpelier, Vermont, U.S.
- Party: Republican
- Spouse: Sarah Elizabeth Putnam (m. 1859–1889, his death)
- Education: University of Vermont (A.B., A.M.)
- Occupation: Attorney

Charles H. Heath (November 4, 1829 – July 12, 1889) was a Vermont politician and attorney who served as President of the Vermont Senate.

== Biography ==
Charles Henry Heath was born in Woodbury, Vermont on November 4, 1829. He graduated from the University of Vermont (UVM) with an AB in 1854 and received an AM from UVM in 1857. Heath taught and served as a school principal in Morrisville while studying law, attained admission to the bar in 1858, and began a practice in Plainfield. Among the prospective attorneys who studied under Heath was Stephen C. Shurtleff.

A Republican, Heath served as Washington County State's Attorney from 1862 to 1864. He served in the Vermont Senate for three terms beginning in 1868, and was Senate President from 1870 to 1872.

From 1870 to 1871 Heath was a member of the state Board of Agriculture. He was a trustee of the state library beginning in 1872 and Goddard Seminary from 1875. From 1887 to 1888 Heath was President of the Vermont Bar Association.

After serving in the State Senate, Heath relocated to Montpelier, where he practiced law until his death. He died in Barre on July 12, 1889. He was buried at Green Mount Cemetery in Montpelier.

Political offices
| Preceded by George N. Dale | President pro tempore of the Vermont Senate; 1870 – 1872 | Succeeded by Lyman G. Hinckley |
