= Lyman G. Hinckley =

Lieutenant Governor of Vermont

30th Lieutenant Governor of Vermont
- In office October 8, 1874 – October 5, 1876
- Governor: Asahel Peck
- Preceded by: Russell S. Taft
- Succeeded by: Redfield Proctor

President pro tempore of the Vermont Senate
- In office 1872–1874
- Preceded by: Charles H. Heath
- Succeeded by: Redfield Proctor

Member of the Vermont Senate from Orange County
- In office 1872–1874 Serving with William R. Shedd
- Preceded by: Heman A. White; Harry H. Niles
- Succeeded by: John W. Rowell; William T. George

Member of the Vermont House of Representatives from Chelsea
- In office 1878–1882
- Preceded by: Burnham Martin
- Succeeded by: Joseph P. Tracy
- In office 1868–1870
- Preceded by: Carlos Moore
- Succeeded by: William Hebard
- In office 1862–1864
- Preceded by: William F. Dickinson
- Succeeded by: William Hebard

Personal details
- Born: April 13, 1832 Post Mills, Vermont, U.S.
- Died: December 26, 1887 (aged 55) Boston, Massachusetts U.S.
- Resting place: Highland Cemetery, Chelsea, Vermont
- Party: Republican
- Spouse: Mary Sybil Henry (m. 1861-1874, her death)
- Relations: William Wirt Henry (brother-in-law); George Albert Clough (brother-in-law)
- Children: 1
- Education: Dartmouth College (BA)
- Profession: Attorney; Public official

Military service
- Allegiance: United States (Union)
- Service: Vermont Militia
- Years of service: 1865–1866
- Rank: First Lieutenant
- Unit: 2nd Brigade, 1st Division
- Wars: American Civil War

Lyman Gillett Hinckley (April 13, 1832 – November 26, 1887) was a lawyer and politician who served as the 30th lieutenant governor of Vermont from 1874 to 1876.

== Early life ==
Lyman Gillett Hinckley was born in the Post Mills area of Thetford, Vermont on April 13, 1832, a son of Lyman Hinckley and Phebe (Gillett) Hinckley. His father was a noted anti-slavery activist and served in local offices including assistant judge of the Orange County court.

Hinckley attended the schools of Thetford and graduated from Thetford Academy in 1851. In 1852, he began attendance at Dartmouth College while teaching school and selling books and newspaper subscriptions door-to-door to pay his tuition. He graduated in 1856, and moved to Chelsea. Hinckley studied law with William Hebard and Burnham Martin and was admitted to the bar in 1860. Hinckley did not actively practice law, preferring instead to concentrate on his duties as county clerk.

== Political career ==
A Republican, from 1856 to 1859 he was Assistant Clerk of the Vermont House of Representatives, and he was Clerk of Orange County, Vermont from 1860 until his death. Hinckley served as a Town of Chelsea Justice of the Peace and Town Meeting Moderator, also serving in the Vermont House of Representatives from 1862 to 1864 and 1868 to 1870. After the October 1864 St. Albans Raid, the northernmost action of the American Civil War, Vermont created a militia division to aid in border security. Hinckley joined the 2nd Brigade as judge advocate with the rank of first lieutenant, and he served from April 1865 until the militia was discharged in 1866.

From 1872 to 1874 he served in the Vermont Senate and was chosen to serve as President pro tem. He was then elected Lieutenant Governor and served one term, 1874 to 1876. In 1878 and 1880 he returned to the Vermont House of Representatives.

== Death and burial ==
Hinckley died suddenly on November 26, 1887 while in Boston to visit his sisters for Thanksgiving. He was buried at Highland Cemetery in Chelsea.

== Family ==
In 1861, Hinckley married Mary Sybil Henry of Waterbury, Vermont, the sister of William Wirt Henry. They had a daughter, Hattie, who died in 1872 at age eight. Mary Hinckley died in 1874, and Lyman Hinckley never remarried.

Hinckley's sister Amelia was the wife of architect George Albert Clough.

Party political offices
Preceded by Russell S. Taft	Republican nominee for Lieutenant Governor of Vermont; 1874	Succeeded by Redfield Proctor
Political offices
Preceded by Russell S. Taft	Lieutenant Governor of Vermont; 1874–1876	Succeeded by Redfield Proctor
