= William A. Crombie =

Mayor of Burlington, Vermont

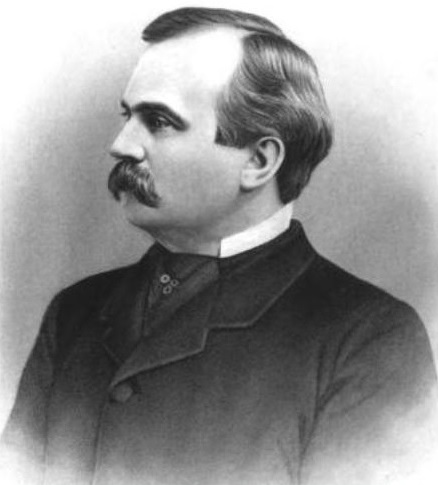
- From 1886's History of Chittenden County, Vermont

Mayor of Burlington, Vermont
- In office April 1, 1889 – April 6, 1891
- Preceded by: William W. Henry
- Succeeded by: Seneca Haselton

Personal details
- Born: April 20, 1844 New Boston, New Hampshire
- Died: January 3, 1914 (aged 69) Manhattan, New York
- Resting place: Lakeview Cemetery, Burlington, Vermont
- Party: Republican
- Spouse: Sarah Elizabeth "Lizzie" Murray (m. 1868-1907, her death)
- Children: 3
- Profession: Lumber dealer

Military service
- Allegiance: Vermont
- Branch/service: Vermont Militia
- Years of service: 1886–1888
- Rank: Colonel
- Unit: Staff of Governor Ebenezer J. Ormsbee

William A. Crombie (April 20, 1844 - January 3, 1914) was a businessman and local government official in Burlington, Vermont. A Republican, among the offices in which he served was mayor of Burlington (1889–1891).

== Early life ==
William August Crombie, (Note: His middle name is usually given as "August" but is sometimes written as "Augustus.") was born in New Boston, New Hampshire on April 20, 1844, a son of Samuel Coolidge Crombie (1814–1879) and Susan Augusta (Choate) Crombie (1818–1857). When he was six years old, his parents moved the family to Nashua, New Hampshire. Crombie was educated at Pinkerton Academy in Derry, New Hampshire, and at Nashua High School.

== Business career ==
At age 16, Crombie joined the Boston, Lowell & Nashua Railway. Beginning with an entry-level position as a tally clerk in the freight department, he worked his way through the department's ranks to become a cashier. He remained with the railroad until 1864, when he moved to Burlington, Vermont.

After becoming a resident of Burlington, Crombie began a career in the lumber business as an employee of L. Barnes & Co. a company owned by Lawrence Barnes, who also operated several other prominent Burlington enterprises. In 1869, Barnes sold L. Barnes & Co. to the owners of a new venture, Shepard, Davis & Company, where Crombie continued to work. In 1876, Shepard, Davis was succeeded by a new company, Shepard & Morse Lumber Company, which included Crombie and George H. Morse as managing partners. Crombie was also an investor, partner, or board of directors member for several other businesses, including the Burlington Shade Roller Company, Porter Manufacturing Company, Baldwin Refrigerator Company, Vermont Life Insurance Company, American Milk Sugar Company, and Brush Electric Light and Power Company.

== Political career ==
Crombie was active in Burlington's politics and government as a Republican and attended several city and Chittenden County conventions as a delegate. He was a member of Burlington's board of school commissioners and served as the board's clerk. In 1886, Crombie was appointed aide-de-camp with the rank of colonel on the military staff of Governor Ebenezer J. Ormsbee, and he served until 1888.

In 1889 he was elected to a one-year term as mayor of Burlington, an office previously held by George Morse. He was nominated unanimously by Burlington's Republican Party and in the general election he defeated Democratic nominee Seneca Haselton by 1126 votes (61.5%) to 705 (38.5%). In 1890, he was easily renominated, and in the general election defeated Democrat Elliot M. Sutton by 1041 (56%) votes to 817 (44%). Crombie served as mayor from April 1889 to April 1891.

== Later career ==
In 1894, Crombie relocated to New York City, where he owned and operated the W. M. Crombie & Company wholesale lumber dealership is partnership with his sons and George Morse. He maintained his interest in politics, and became the Republican committee leader of the 19th Assembly District and a member of the New York County Republican Committee's executive committee.

Crombie was a member of several civic, political, and fraternal organizations. A partial list includes The Union League Club, Lumbermen's Club of New York City, West Side Republican Club, Sons of the American Revolution, Vermont Society of New York City, Lake Champlain Association, Burlington YMCA, Burlington Young Men's Association, and Merchants' Association of New York City.

== Death and burial ==
Crombie died in New York City on January 3, 1914. Funeral services were held at the Church of the Divine Paternity in Manhattan and Burlington's Unitarian Church. Honorary pallbearers in Burlington included Urban A. Woodbury, Theodore S. Peck, and William J. Van Patten. He was buried at Lakeview Cemetery in Burlington.

== Family ==
On June 2, 1868, Crombie married Sarah Elizabeth "Lizzie" Murray (1846–1907) of Nashua, a daughter of Orlando Dana and Mary Jane (Witherbee) Murray. They were the parents of three children, including William Murray Crombie (1871–1939) and Arthur Choate Crombie (1873–1939), who were partners in Crombie's New York City lumber business, and Maude Elizabeth (1881–1966), the wife of first George Franklin Ladue and later Charles Ellmaker Willis.

== Sources ==
=== Books ===
- Dodge, Prentiss Cutler (1912). Encyclopedia Vermont Biography. Burlington, VT: Ullery Publishing Company. p. 157 – via HathiTrust.
- Peck, Theodore S. (1888). Report of the Adjutant and Inspector General for 1887-88. Rutland, VT: The Tuttle Company. p. 26 – via Google Books.
- Rann, William S (1886). History of Chittenden County, Vermont. Syracuse, NY: D. Mason & Co. pp. 795-796 – via Internet Archive.

=== Newspapers ===
- "City of Burlington: Proceedings of the Burlington Board of Aldermen". Burlington Free Press. Burlington, VT. May 17, 1870. p. 3 – via Newspapers.com.
- "Chittenden County Republican Convention: Town Committees". Burlington Free Press. Burlington, VT. July 8, 1880. p. 3 – via Newspapers.com.
- "Republican City Caucus". Burlington Free Press. Burlington, VT. June 21, 1884. p. 3 – via Newspapers.com.
- "Republican Caucus Saturday Evening". Burlington Clipper. Burlington, VT. February 28, 1889. p. 4 – via Newspapers.com.
- "Mayor and City Judge". Burlington Free Press. Burlington, VT. March 6, 1889. p. 5 – via Newspapers.com.
- "Heartily Endorsed: Result of the Republican City Caucus Saturday Evening". Burlington Free Press. Burlington, VT. February 24, 1890. p. 5 – via Newspapers.com.
- "Mayor and City Judge: The Vote for Mayor". Burlington Free Press. Burlington, VT. March 5, 1890. p. 5 – via Newspapers.com.
- "Wm. A. Crosbie Dead". The New York Times. New York, NY. January 4, 1914. p. 20 – via Newspapers.com.
- "Yesterday's Funerals: William A. Crosbie". Burlington Free Press. Burlington, VT. January 7, 1914. p. 8 – via Newspapers.com.
- "Obituary, Mrs. Maude Crombie Ladue Willis". Nasuha Telegraph. Nashua, NH. June 14, 1966. p. 2 – via Newspapers.com.
