= Senator Rowell =

Senator Rowell may refer to:

- Chester Rowell (1844–1912), California State Senate
- John W. Rowell (1835–1924), Vermont State Senate
