= Senator Pierpoint =

Senator Pierpoint may refer to:

- John Pierpoint (1805–1882), Vermont State Senate
- Robert Pierpoint (Vermont politician) (1791–1864), Vermont State Senate
