= John Pierpoint =

American judge (1805–1882)

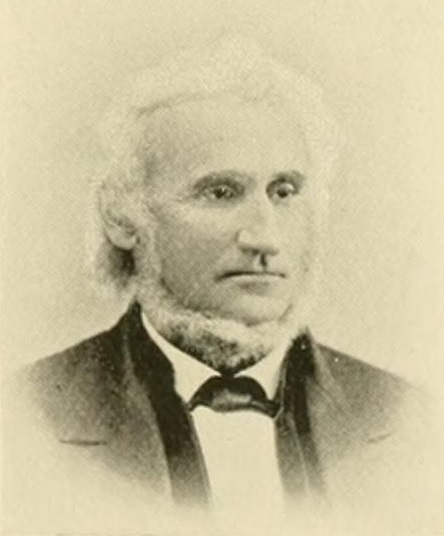
- From 1894's Men of Vermont Illustrated

Chief Justice of the Vermont Supreme Court
- In office 1865–1882
- Preceded by: Luke P. Poland
- Succeeded by: Homer Elihu Royce

Associate Justice of the Vermont Supreme Court
- In office 1857–1865
- Preceded by: None (New position)
- Succeeded by: Benjamin H. Steele

Member of the Vermont Senate
- In office 1855–1857 Serving with Joseph Warner (1855, 1856), William R. Sanford (1857)
- Preceded by: Erasmus D. Warner, Rollin J. Jones
- Succeeded by: William R. Sanford, Samuel P. Nash
- Constituency: Addison County

Member of the Vermont House of Representatives
- In office 1841–1842
- Preceded by: William T. Parker
- Succeeded by: Enoch D. Woodbridge
- Constituency: Vergennes

Personal details
- Born: January 10, 1805 Litchfield, Connecticut, US
- Died: January 7, 1882 (aged 76) Vergennes, Vermont, US
- Resting place: Prospect Cemetery, Vergennes, Vermont, US
- Party: Republican
- Other political affiliations: Democratic; Free Soil
- Spouse: Sarah Maria Lawrence (m. 1838)
- Children: 7
- Relatives: Robert Pierpoint (brother)
- Education: Litchfield Law School
- Profession: Attorney

John Pierpoint (January 10, 1805 – January 7, 1882) was a Vermont attorney and judge. He served as a justice of the Vermont Supreme Court from 1857 until his death, and was Chief Justice beginning in 1865.

== Biography ==
John Pierpoint (sometimes spelled Pierpont) was born in Litchfield, Connecticut on January 10, 1805, the son of Daniel and Sarah (Phelps) Pierpoint. Sarah Phelps Pierpoint was the aunt of Samuel S. Phelps, who served in the United States Senate. In 1815, Pierpoint moved to Rutland, Vermont to live with his brother Robert Pierpoint, who served as Lieutenant Governor of Vermont from 1848 to 1849.

Pierpoint was educated in Rutland, studied at the Litchfield Law School in 1825 and 1826, and was admitted to the bar in 1827. He practiced in Pittsford until 1832, when he relocated to Vergennes. In 1834, Pierpoint received an honorary degree (Master of Arts) from Middlebury College.

After a period of ill health in 1834 and 1835, Pierpoint moved to Fayette, Mississippi to recuperate; he lived there for two years before returning to Vergennes. Initially a Democrat opposed to slavery, he was Addison County's Register of Probate from 1836 to 1857. From 1841 to 1842, Pierpoint served in the Vermont House of Representatives. He was a member of the Vermont State Senate from 1855 to 1857, and served as chairman of the Judiciary Committee in 1856 and 1857. He later became a member of the Free Soil Party, and joined the Republican Party when it was founded in the mid-1850s as the main anti-slavery party in the United States.

In 1857, the Vermont General Assembly chose Pierpoint to serve as an associate justice of the Vermont Supreme Court, following an expansion of the court from three justices to six. He served until 1865, when he was elevated to chief justice, succeeding Luke P. Poland. Piepoint served as chief justice until his death, and was succeeded by Homer E. Royce. In 1871 he received the honorary degree of LL.D. from Middlebury College.

== Death and burial ==
Pierpoint died in Vergennes on January 7, 1882. He was buried at Prospect Cemetery in Vergennes.

== Family ==
In 1838, Pierpoint married Sarah Maria Lawrence (1817–1884), the daughter of Vilee Lawrence of Vergennes. They were the parents of seven children. A son and two daughters survived him, all of whom resided in Chicago.

== Sources ==
=== Books ===
- Caverly, A. M. (1872). History of the Town of Pittsford, Vt. Rutland, VT: Tuttle & Co. p. 604.
- Crockett, Walter Hill (1923). Vermont, The Green Mountain State. Vol. 5. New York, NY: Century History Company.
- Middlebury College (1917). Catalogue of Officers and Students of Middlebury College. Middlebury, VT: Middlebury College.
- Nichols, George (1878). Vermont Legislative Directory. Montpelier, VT: J. & J. M. Poland.
- Ross, Jonathan (1884). Memorial to John Pierpoint, Read at the Annual Meeting, 1884. Montpelier, VT: Vermont Bar Association.
- Ullery, Jacob G. (1894). Men of Vermont Illustrated. Brattleboro, VT: Transcript Publishing Company. p. 183.

=== Internet ===
- Vermont State Archives and Records Administration (2015). "Election Results: United States Representative (Three Districts); 1852-1880" (PDF). sec.state.vt.us. Montpelier, VT: Vermont Secretary of State.
- Vermont State Archives and Records Administration (2017). "Justices of the Vermont Supreme Court, 1778–Present" (PDF). sec.state.vt.us. Montpelier, VT: Vermont Secretary of State.

Political offices
Preceded by New position	Associate Justice of the Vermont Supreme Court; 1857–1865	Succeeded by Benjamin H. Steele
Preceded by Luke P. Poland	Chief Justice of the Vermont Supreme Court; 1865–1882	Succeeded by Homer E. Royce
