= Planters Hall =

Historic house in Mississippi, United States

- U.S. National Register of Historic Places
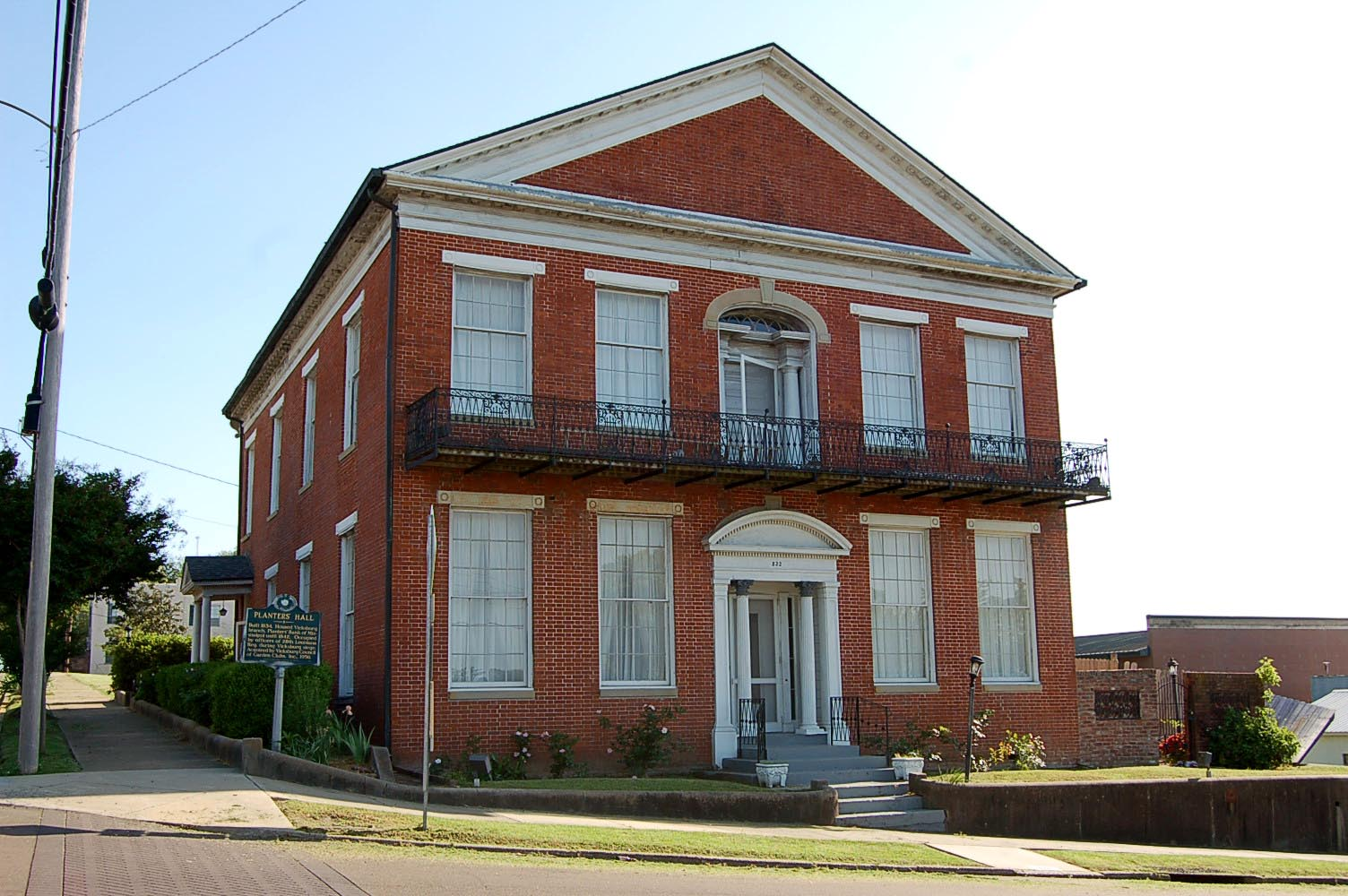
- Planters Hall

- Location within Mississippi Location within the United States
- Location: 822 Main St., Vicksburg, Mississippi
- Coordinates: 32°21′14″N 90°52′46″W
- Built: c. 1834 (original); pre-1854 (increase)
- Architectural style: Greek Revival (original)
- NRHP reference No.: 71000459 and 88002068
- Added to NRHP: June 21, 1971 (original); October 21, 1988 (increase)

Planters Hall in Vicksburg, Mississippi was built in c.1834. It is a two-story brick Greek Revival building with brick laid in Flemish bond. Its first floor was a bank, and the second floor was a living quarters once occupied by the bank president. It was listed on the National Register of Historic Places in 1971. The boundaries of the listing were increased in 1988 to include two dependencies built before 1854: a kitchen and a carriage house/stable.

During the 1863 Siege of Vicksburg it was occupied by Colonel Allen Thomas and his staff of the Louisiana Regiment. It was apparently not damaged in the siege, despite being within a few blocks of the Mississippi River.

The kitchen is a two-story brick building; the carriage house/stable is a one-story stuccoed brick building.
