= Philip K. Gleed =

American politician

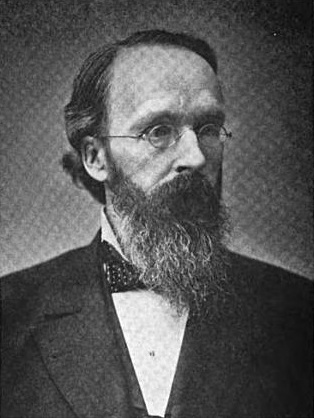
Philip King Gleed

Philip King Gleed (September 10, 1834 – June 29, 1897) was a Vermont attorney and politician who served as President of the Vermont State Senate.

== Biography ==
Gleed was born in Granby, Quebec, Canada on September 10, 1834, the son of Reverend John and Elizabeth (Prettyjohn) Gleed, formerly of England. He was raised in Morrisville, Vermont, and attended People's Academy in Morrisville, Bakersfield Academy in Bakersfield, and Troy Conference Academy in Poultney, from which he graduated in 1855. He taught school while attending Union College, from which he graduated in 1859. He then studied law with his brother Thomas, attained admission to the bar, and practiced in Morrisville. Gleed rose to prominence as a lawyer, practicing with H. Henry Powers and attaining election as President of the Vermont Bar Association in 1888. Gleed was also involved in banking and other businesses, including serving on the board of directors of banks in Morrsiville and Hyde Park.

Gleed served in the American Civil War, attaining the rank of Captain in the 4th Vermont Militia Regiment, which protected the Vermont-Canada border following the St. Albans Raid.

A Republican, Gleed served in several local and county offices, including school board member, village trustee for Morrisville, Selectman for Morristown, Vermont, State's Attorney for Lamoille County from 1863 to 1868, Member of the Vermont House of Representatives from 1867 to 1868, and a federal assessor of internal revenue from 1870 to 1874.

Gleed was State's Attorney again from 1880 to 1882. In 1880 he was also elected to the Vermont Senate, serving one two-year term and leading the Senate as its President Pro Tempore. From 1890 to 1892 Gleed served as Vermont's Commissioner of Taxes.

Philip K. Gleed died in Morrisville on June 29, 1897. He was buried in Morrisville's Pleasant View Cemetery.

== Family ==
Gleed married his first wife, Ellen Jane Fuller (1833–1883) of Moira, New York in 1861. They had two children, both of whom died before adulthood. In 1885 he married a Morrisville widow, Laura Kenney Fleetwood. Laura Fleetwood was the mother of Frederick G. Fleetwood, who studied law under Gleed's tutelage.

Political offices
Preceded by Loveland Munson	President pro tempore of the Vermont State Senate; 1880 – 1881	Succeeded by Justus Dartt
