= Allen Thomas =

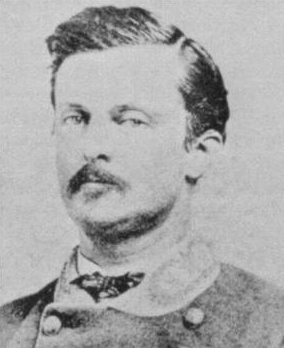
- Born: December 14, 1830; Howard County, Maryland
- Died: December 3, 1907 (aged 76); Waveland, Mississippi
- Burial place: Donaldsonville, Louisiana
- Military career
- Allegiance: Confederate States of America
- Branch: (Confederate States of America) Confederate States Army
- Service years: 1861–1865 (CSA)
- Rank: Brigadier General (CSA)
- Conflicts: American Civil War
- Other work: Professor of Agriculture; Louisiana State University; Coiner, U.S. Mint (New Orleans); U.S. Minister to Venezuela

Allen Thomas (December 14, 1830 – December 3, 1907) was a Confederate States Army brigadier general during the American Civil War (Civil War). He was born in Howard County, Maryland, and became a lawyer but he moved to Louisiana in the later 1850s and became a planter and colonel in the Louisiana militia. After the war, he was a planter, Presidential elector in 1872 and 1880, professor of agriculture at Louisiana State University and coiner at the United States Mint at New Orleans, Louisiana. He moved to Florida in 1889. Between 1894 and 1897, he was United States Minister to Venezuela. He moved to Mississippi in 1907 and died there in that year. He was buried at Donaldsonville, Louisiana.

== Early life ==
Allen Thomas was born December 14, 1830, in Howard County, Maryland. He graduated from Princeton University in 1850 and became a lawyer. After his marriage, in 1857, he moved to Louisiana where he became a planter and a colonel in the Louisiana militia. He was a brother-in-law of Confederate Lieutenant General Richard Taylor.

== American Civil War service ==
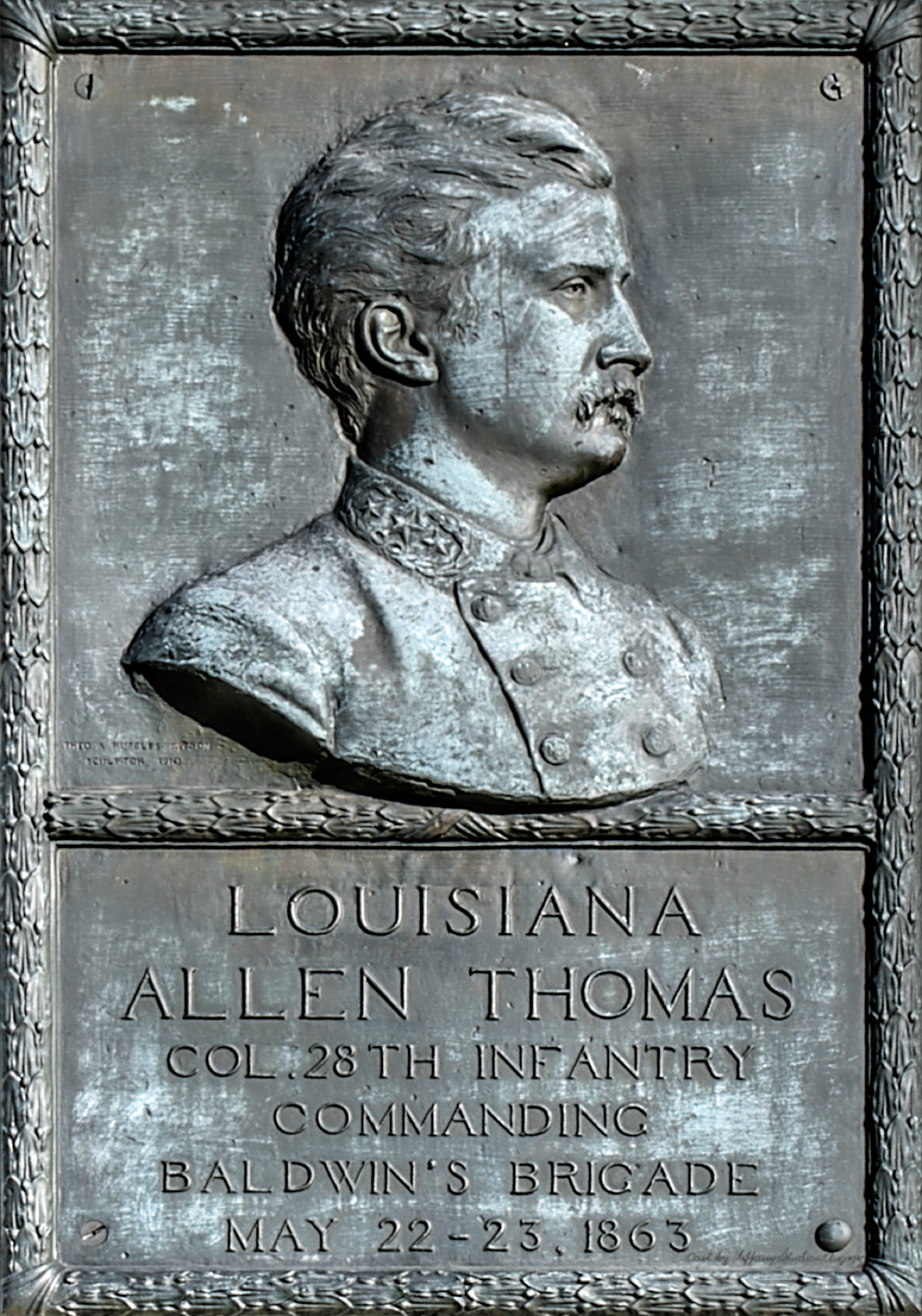
Bronze relief portrait of Thomas by T.A.R. Kitson, Vicksburg National Military Park

Allen Thomas joined the 29th Louisiana Infantry as a major in July 1861. On May 3, 1862, he was promoted to colonel of the regiment, when it was expanded from its original battalion size. He commanded a brigade in the Confederate Department of Mississippi and East Louisiana in December 1862 and January 1863. He fought in the Vicksburg Campaign, notably at the Battle of Chickasaw Bayou (Chickasaw Bluffs or Walnut Hills). During the siege of Vicksburg, Thomas and his regimental staff occupied Planters Hall, a building which survives and is listed on the U.S. National Register of Historic Places. Thomas was captured in the fall of Vicksburg on July 4, 1863, and was later exchanged. After his parole, he brought Lieutenant General John C. Pemberton's report on the fall of Vicksburg to Richmond. He then served in reorganizing paroled and exchanged prisoners. Thomas was promoted to brigadier general on February 4, 1864. He was assigned to the department of his brother-in-law, Lieutenant General Richard Taylor, at Alexandria, Louisiana, where he commanded a brigade of five Louisiana regiments and a battalion.

From September 1864 to May 26, 1865—with the exception of March 17, 1865, to May 10, 1865, when he commanded the division of Major General Camille Armand Jules Marie, Prince de Polignac, during the latter's trip to France seeking help for the Confederacy from Napoleon III—Thomas commanded a brigade in Polignac's division in the Confederate Army of the Trans-Mississippi.

Allen Thomas was paroled at Natchitoches, Louisiana, on June 8, 1865, and pardoned on July 19, 1865.

== Aftermath ==
After the Civil War, Thomas returned to his plantation. He became a professor of agriculture and member of the board of supervisors at Louisiana State University in 1882–1884. He was a Presidential elector in 1872 and 1880. Then he became coiner at the United States Mint at New Orleans. Thomas was nominated to run for Congress in 1876 but declined. In 1889, he moved to Florida. He was U.S. Minister to Venezuela from 1895 to 1897, succeeding Seneca Haselton.

Thomas moved to Waveland, Mississippi, where he had bought a plantation, in 1907 and died there on December 3, 1907. Allen Thomas was buried at Ascension Catholic Church Cemetery, Donaldsonville, Louisiana, in the family vault of his wife.

== See also ==
- List of American Civil War generals (Confederate)
