= Benjamin H. Steele =

American judge (1837–1873)

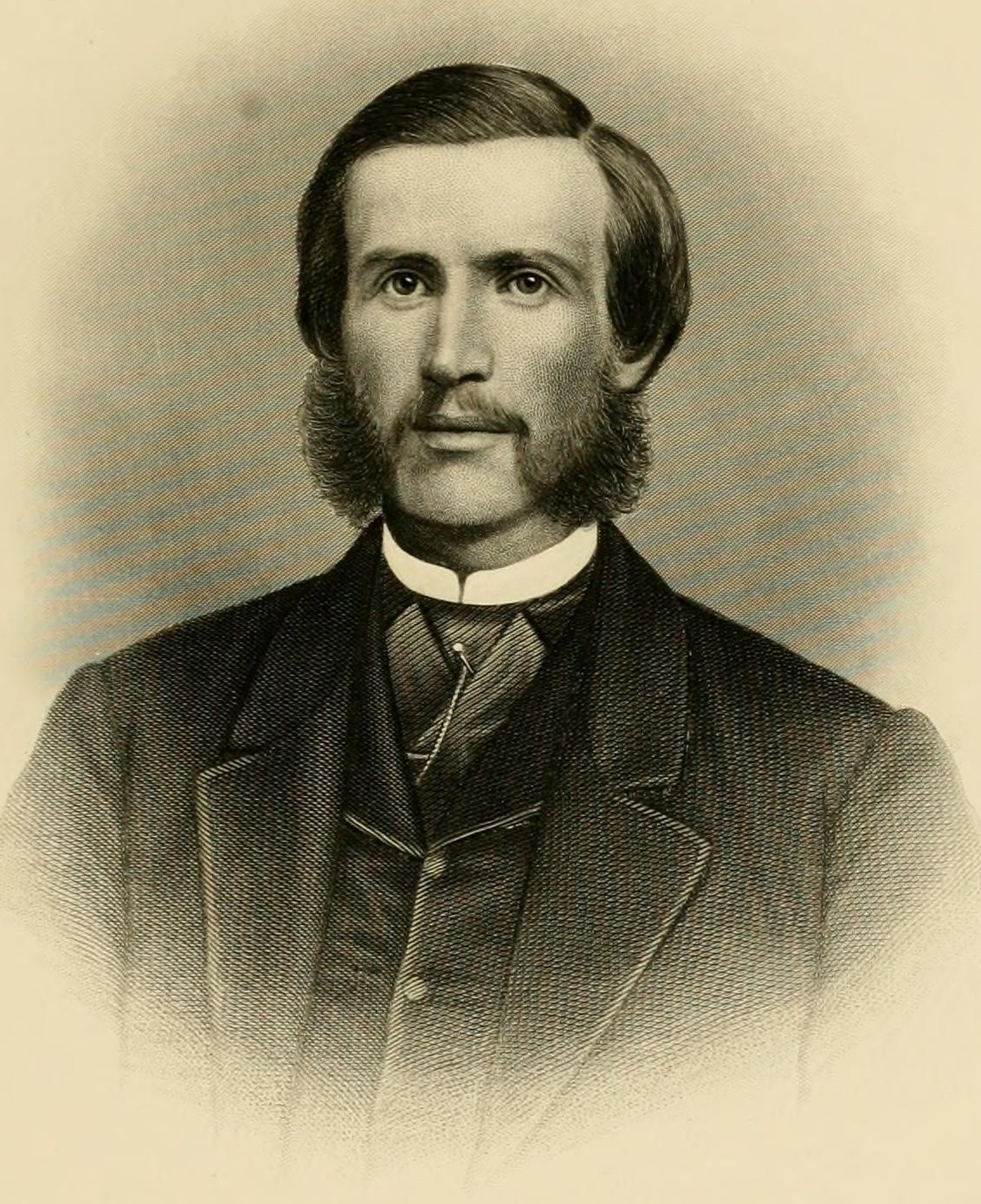
- From 1886's Biography of the Bar of Orleans County, Vermont

Associate Justice of the Vermont Supreme Court
- In office 1865–1870
- Preceded by: John Pierpoint
- Succeeded by: Timothy P. Redfield

Personal details
- Born: February 8, 1837 Stanstead, Quebec, Canada
- Died: July 13, 1873 (aged 36) Faribault, Minnesota
- Resting place: Hartland Village Cemetery, Hartland, Vermont
- Party: Republican
- Spouse: Martha (Mattie) Foxcroft Sumner (m. 1861-1873, his death)
- Relations: Hiram R. Steele (brother) Samuel Everett Pingree (brother-in-law)
- Children: 2
- Education: Dartmouth College
- Profession: Attorney

Military service
- Allegiance: United States of America; Union
- Branch/service: Vermont Militia
- Years of service: 1860–1861
- Rank: Colonel
- Unit: Staff of Governor Erastus Fairbanks
- Battles/wars: American Civil War

Benjamin H. Steele (February 8, 1837 – July 13, 1873) was an American attorney and judge. He served as an associate justice of the Vermont Supreme Court from 1865 to 1870.

== Early life ==
Benjamin Hinman Steele was born in Stanstead, Quebec, on February 8, 1837, the son of Sanford and Mary (Hinman) Steele. Steele was educated at academies in Stanstead and Derby, Vermont, and was a superior student; at age 14 he began teaching, and worked at schools in Troy, Vermont, and Concord, Massachusetts. Steele attended the College of Saint-Pierre-de-la-Rivière-du-Sud to learn French, and then attended Norwich University.

He graduated from Dartmouth College in 1857; in addition to being the class valedictorian, Steele was a member of the Psi Upsilon fraternity and Phi Beta Kappa society. While at Dartmouth, Steele developed an interest in the military, and organized an informal militia company, the "Dartmouth Grays", which consisted of members of the class of 1859, including Wheelock G. Veazey and Edward Cowles. At the start of the American Civil War, several former members of the Dartmouth Grays were able to receive commissions in the Union Army as a result of their militia experience.

== Admission to the bar ==
After graduating from Dartmouth, Steele became the principal of an academy in Barton, Vermont, where he also began to study law with attorney John P. Sartle. Steele interrupted his legal studies when he became ill; after recovery, he traveled to Cambridge, Massachusetts, intending to enroll at Harvard Law School. Instead, while visiting the Massachusetts Supreme Judicial Court in 1858, Steele's friends suggested that he apply to be admitted to the bar. He was interviewed by a committee which included Benjamin Butler; Rufus Choate, who had overheard a portion of Steele's interview, commended him on his performance. Steele easily passed the examination, and was qualified as an attorney.

== Career ==
After considering relocating to the western United States, Steele opted instead to begin a practice in Derby. While practicing law, Steele also served as postmaster of Derby Line. He later moved to St. Johnsbury, and among the prospective attorneys who studied in his office was Henry Clay Ide.

Steele's health prevented him from joining the Army during the Civil War; instead, he was appointed drillmaster on the military staff of Governor Erastus Fairbanks with the rank of colonel, and provided the initial military training to newly recruited Union Army soldiers.

In 1865, Luke P. Poland, the chief justice of the Vermont Supreme Court, was appointed to fill the vacancy in the United States Senate caused by the death of Jacob Collamer. Associate Justice John Pierpoint succeeded Poland; despite being only 28 years old, Steele's reputation as an attorney was so well established after his seven years' experience that he was appointed to fill the vacant Associate Justice's position. Steele served on the court until 1870, when he declined reappointment, and returned to the practice of law. In February 1870, Governor Peter T. Washburn died; the Lieutenant Governor, George Whitman Hendee, succeeded to the governorship, and Steele was the jurist who administered the oath of office to Hendee.

In 1870, Steele was appointed to the Vermont Board of Education, on which he served until 1873. In 1872, Steele was an unsuccessful candidate for the United States House of Representatives; the Republican nomination, then tantamount to election, went to Poland. Later in 1872, Steele was a delegate to the Republican National Convention.

== Death and burial ==
Steele's health had never been robust, and he suffered from frequent bronchial infections and hemorrhages. In 1873, his health began to severely decline, and he traveled to New York City for medical advice. Accepting a suggestion that the western United States might provide a healthier climate, he undertook a trip to Minnesota. His health improved for a time, but then continued to decline, and he died in Faribault on July 13, 1873. Steele was buried at Hartland Village Cemetery in Hartland, Vermont.

== Family ==
In 1861, Steele married Martha (Mattie) Foxcroft Sumner (1840–1896), the daughter of David and Wealthy (Thomas) Sumner of Hartland. They were the parents of two children, daughter Mary Hinman Steele (1853–1937), and son David Sumner Steele (1871–1937).

Steele's sister Lydia (1839–1935) was the wife of Samuel Everett Pingree, who received the Medal of Honor during the American Civil War and served as Governor of Vermont. Pingree and Steele had been classmates at Dartmouth College. Steele's brothers, Hiram R. Steele and Sanford H. Steele, both became prominent attorneys in New York City.

Steele was also a second cousin of Harriet Hinman, the wife of Governor Josiah Grout. Steele and Hinman were great-grandchildren of Benjamin Hinman Sr. and Helen Brown of Newport, Vermont.

== Sources ==
=== Books ===
- Baldwin, Frederick W. (1886). Biography of the Bar of Orleans County, Vermont. Montpelier, VT: Vermont Watchman and State Journal Press.
- Carleton, Hiram (1903). Genealogical and Family History of the State of Vermont. Chicago, IL: Lewis Publishing Company.
- Crockett, Walter Hill (1921). Vermont: The Green Mountain State. Vol. 4. New York, NY: Century History Company.
- Dodge, Prentiss Cutler (1912). Encyclopedia of Vermont Biography. Burlington, VT: Ullery Publishing Company.
- Ellis, William Arba (1911). Norwich University, 1819–1911: Her History, Her Graduates, Her Roll of Honor. Vol. 2. Montpelier, VT: Capital City Press.
- Grout, Josiah (1919). Memoir of Gen'l William Wallace Grout and Autobiography of Josiah Grout. Newport, VT: Bullock Press.
- Ullery, Jacob G. (1894). Men of Vermont illustrated. Brattleboro, VT: Transcript Publishing Company.

=== Newspapers ===
- "Marriages: Benj. H. Steele and Mattie Sumner". St. Johnsbury Caledonian. St. Johnsbury, VT. March 1, 1861.
- "B. H. Steele, Esq., has received the appointment of postmaster at Derby Line, Vt". Green Mountain Freeman. Montpelier, VT. April 24, 1861.
- "Military Intelligence in Brief". St. Johnsbury Caledonian. St. Johnsbury, VT. May 31, 1861. "The company organized at Coventry, Capt. West, are in rendezvous at West Derby, occupying the hotel of Lucius Robinson, esq., which he has tendered them, and are under the drill of Col. B. H. Steele of the governor's staff."
- "The New Governor". Burlington Free Press. Burlington, VT. February 14, 1870.
- "Obituary, Sanford H. Steele". Brooklyn Life. Brooklyn, NY. December 20, 1920.

=== Internet ===
- "Burial Entry, Benjamin Hinman Steele". Hartland History.org. Hartland, VT: Hartland Historical Society.

Political offices
Preceded by John Pierpoint	Justice of the Vermont Supreme Court; 1865–1870	Succeeded by Timothy P. Redfield
