= Russell S. Taft =

American politician and judge (1835–1902)

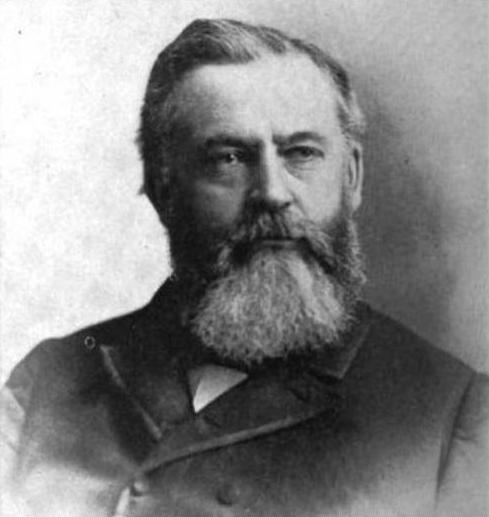

Chief Justice of the Vermont Supreme Court
- In office January 12, 1899 – March 22, 1902
- Preceded by: Jonathan Ross
- Succeeded by: John W. Rowell

Associate Justice of the Vermont Supreme Court
- In office December 17, 1880 – January 11, 1899
- Preceded by: James Barrett
- Succeeded by: John H. Watson

Member of the Vermont House of Representatives from Burlington
- In office October 6, 1880 – December 16, 1880
- Preceded by: Bradley B. Smalley
- Succeeded by: Robert Roberts

Lieutenant Governor of Vermont
- In office October 3, 1872 – October 8, 1874
- Governor: Julius Converse
- Preceded by: George N. Dale
- Succeeded by: Lyman G. Hinckley

Member of the Vermont Senate from Chittenden County
- In office October 12, 1865 – October 10, 1867 Serving with John L. Barstow, Edgar H. Lane (1866); Amos Hobart, Anson J. Crane (1865)
- Preceded by: Leverett B. Englesby, Amos Hobart, Anson J. Crane
- Succeeded by: John L. Barstow, Edgar H. Lane, Eleazer R. Hard

Register of Probate for Vermont's Chittenden District
- In office 1866–1878
- Preceded by: W. S. Burnap
- Succeeded by: Elihu B. Taft

State's Attorney of Chittenden County, Vermont
- In office 1862–1865
- Preceded by: Jeremiah French
- Succeeded by: Leverett B. Englesby

Personal details
- Born: January 28, 1835 Williston, Vermont, US
- Died: March 22, 1902 (aged 67) Burlington, Vermont, US
- Party: Republican
- Spouse(s): Melinda L. Carlisle (m. 1858-1873, her death); Jane Marlett Wyatt (m. 1876-1902, his death)
- Children: 1
- Education: Williston Academy, Williston, Vermont; Newbury Academy, Newbury, Vermont
- Profession: Attorney

Russell Smith Taft (January 28, 1835 – March 22, 1902) was a lawyer, politician and judge who served as the 29th lieutenant governor of Vermont and chief justice of the Vermont Supreme Court.

== Early life ==
Russell Smith Taft was born in Williston, Vermont, on January 28, 1835, the seventh of the children born to Elijah and Orinda (Kimball) Taft. He attended schools in Williston and Burlington, and completed his schooling at Williston Academy in Williston and Newbury Academy in Newbury. He taught school in Williston and Richmond, then studied law with George F. Edmunds, Torrey E. Wales and others, and attained admission to the bar in 1856.

After passing the bar, Taft practiced in Burlington in partnership with Wales for 21 years. Among the prospective attorneys who learned the law in the Wales and Taft office was Rufus E. Brown, who later served as Vermont Attorney General. Taft was also the first president of the Vermont Life Insurance Company, and later served as its vice president.

== Civic and professional memberships ==
Taft was an author on legal and historical topics, and his articles were carried in The Green Bag and other publications. One of his works, an essay on English common law, resulted in membership in London's Selden Society.

In February 1864, Taft became a member of the Royal Arch Masonry chapter in Burlington. In April 1864, he joined the Knights Templar Masonic organization. As a member of the Scottish Rite, he attained the 32nd degree and served as commander in chief of the Vermont consistory.

== Political career ==
A Republican, Taft served as a selectman for the Town of Burlington from 1861 to 1864. After Burlington was incorporated as a city, Taft served as an alderman from 1865 to 1869.

From 1862 to 1865 Taft was Chittenden County State's Attorney, and he was Chittenden County's Register of Probate from 1863 to 1880.

Taft served in the Vermont Senate from 1865 to 1867, and he was Burlington's City Attorney from 1871 to 1872.

In 1872 Taft was the successful Republican nominee for lieutenant governor over Democrat W. H. H. Bingham, and he served from October 1872 to October 1874. In 1874 he was an unsuccessful candidate for the Republican nomination for governor, losing to Asahel Peck.

Taft represented Burlington in the Vermont House of Representatives in 1880.

== Judicial career ==
In 1880 the Vermont Assembly elected Taft an associate justice of the Vermont Supreme Court. He served until 1899, when he was appointed chief justice, replacing Jonathan Ross, who had been appointed to the United States Senate. He was succeeded as an associate justice by John H. Watson.

== Death and burial ==
Taft served as chief justice until his death, and was succeeded by John W. Rowell. He died in Burlington, Vermont, on March 22, 1902.

== Awards ==
Chief Justice Taft was the recipient of two honorary degrees from the University of Vermont. In 1877, he received an honorary Master of Arts. He received an honorary Doctor of Laws in 1899.

== Family ==
In 1858, Taft married Melinda L. Carlisle of Malone, New York. She died in 1873, and they had no children. In 1876, Taft married Jane (Marlett) Wyatt, a Burlington teacher who served as principal of the city's grammar school. With his second wife, Taft was the father of Russell Wales Taft (1878-1912), who practiced law in Burlington.

Party political offices
Preceded by George N. Dale	Republican nominee for Lieutenant Governor of Vermont; 1872	Succeeded by Lyman G. Hinckley
Political offices
Preceded by George N. Dale	Lieutenant Governor of Vermont; 1872–1874	Succeeded by Lyman G. Hinckley
