= Jonathan Ross (politician) =

American politician and judge (1826–1905)

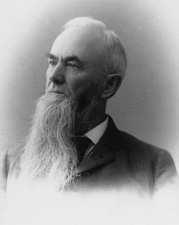

United States Senator from Vermont
- In office January 11, 1899 – October 18, 1900
- Appointed by: Edward Curtis Smith
- Preceded by: Justin S. Morrill
- Succeeded by: William P. Dillingham

Chairman of the Vermont Board of Railroad Commissioners
- In office 1900–1902
- Preceded by: David J. Foster
- Succeeded by: Fuller C. Smith

President of the Vermont Bar Association
- In office 1900–1901
- Preceded by: Charles Hial Darling
- Succeeded by: John Young

Chief Justice of the Vermont Supreme Court
- In office 1890–1899
- Preceded by: Homer E. Royce
- Succeeded by: Russell S. Taft

Associate Justice of the Vermont Supreme Court
- In office 1870–1890
- Preceded by: Benjamin H. Steele
- Succeeded by: Laforrest H. Thompson

Member of the Vermont Senate from Caledonia County
- In office 1870–1870 Serving with John M. Martin
- Preceded by: Harley M. Hall; Horace Fairbanks
- Succeeded by: Calvin Morrill; Charles Rogers Jr.

Member of the Vermont House of Representatives from St. Johnsbury
- In office 1865–1867
- Preceded by: Gates B. Bullard
- Succeeded by: Emerson Hall

Personal details
- Born: April 30, 1826 Waterford, Vermont, U.S.
- Died: February 23, 1905 (aged 78) St. Johnsbury, Vermont, U.S.
- Party: Republican
- Spouse(s): Eliza Ann Carpenter Ross; Helen Daggert Ross
- Children: Caroline C. Ross; Eliza M. Ross; Helen M. Ross; Julia Ross; Martha E. Ross; Edith Helen Ross; Edward H. Ross; Jonathan C. Ross
- Education: Dartmouth College
- Profession: Politician, lawyer, judge, principal

Jonathan Ross (April 30, 1826 – February 23, 1905) was an American politician, lawyer and judge from Vermont. He served as chief justice of the Vermont Supreme Court (1890–1899) and briefly as a United States Senator from Vermont (1899–1900).

== Early life ==
Ross was born in Waterford, Vermont, on April 30, 1826, the son of Royal Ross and Eliza (Mason) Ross. Ross attended the public schools and St. Johnsbury Academy. He graduated from Dartmouth College in 1851 and was principal of the Chelsea and Craftsbury Academies from 1851 to 1856. He studied law in the Chelsea office of former Congressman William Hebard, and later with Charles Davis of Danville and William A. Fletcher of Michigan; he was admitted to the bar in 1856.

== Career ==
Ross was Treasurer of Passumpsic Savings Bank from 1858 to 1868. He practiced law in St. Johnsbury until 1870. After being State's attorney for Caledonia County from 1862 to 1863, he was appointed a member of the State board of education, holding that office from 1866 to 1870.

From 1865 to 1867, Ross was a member of the Vermont House of Representatives and he was a state senator in 1870. He served on the Vermont Council of Censors in 1869. He was judge of the Vermont Supreme Court from 1870 to 1890 and chief justice of Vermont from 1890 to 1899.

In December 1898, U.S. Senator Justin S. Morrill died. Governor Edward Curtis Smith offered to appoint Benjamin F. Fifield to the vacancy, and Fifield tentatively accepted. Several days later, Fifield declined, and Smith then offered the appointment to Ross, who accepted. He served from January 11, 1899, to October 18, 1900, when a successor was elected. While in the Senate, he was chairman of the United States Senate Committee to Examine Branches of the Civil Service (Fifty-sixth Congress) until October 18, 1900, when he was replaced at Special Election. He was not an active candidate for reelection in 1900. In October 1900, Ross was elected president of the Vermont Bar Association, and he served a one-year term. In November 1900, he succeeded David J. Foster as chairman of the state board of railroad commissioners, and he served until being succeeded by Fuller C. Smith in November 1902.

== Death and burial ==
Ross retired to his home in St. Johnsbury, where he resided until his death. He died on February 23, 1905, from injuries sustained when his sleigh was struck by a train a few days earlier. According to published accounts, Ross and his wife were stopped at a crossing while a train passed by. Their horse became frightened and dashed between two train cars, demolishing the sleigh and killing Mrs. Ross. The train crew transported Ross to the hospital, where he was diagnosed with a broken hip and other injuries, and remained until his death. Ross is interred at Mount Pleasant Cemetery in St. Johnsbury, Vermont.

== Family ==
Ross married Eliza Ann Carpenter (1826–1886) on November 22, 1852. They were the parents of eight children, including Caroline C., Eliza M., Helen M., Julia, Martha E., Edith Helen, Edward H., and Jonathan C. In 1887, he married Helen Daggert, and they remained married until her death.

U.S. Senate
Preceded by Justin S. Morrill	U.S. senator (Class 3) from Vermont; January 11, 1899 – October 18, 1900; Served alongside: Redfield Proctor	Succeeded by William P. Dillingham
