= John H. Watson (Vermont judge) =

American judge (1851–1921)

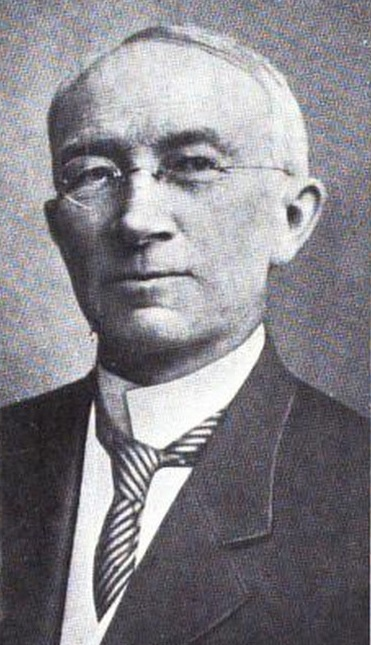
- From 1919's Vermont, Its Government by Walter J. Bigelow

Chief Justice of the Vermont Supreme Court
- In office 1917–1929
- Preceded by: Loveland Munson
- Succeeded by: George M. Powers

Associate Justice of the Vermont Supreme Court
- In office 1899–1917
- Preceded by: Russell S. Taft
- Succeeded by: Willard W. Miles

Member of the Vermont Senate from Orange County
- In office 1892–1894 Serving with William H. Dubois
- Preceded by: Roney M. Harvey, Erastus C. Camp
- Succeeded by: Horace W. Bailey, Joseph K. Darling

State's Attorney of Orange County, Vermont
- In office 1886–1888
- Preceded by: Salmon B. Hebard
- Succeeded by: Joseph D. Denison

Personal details
- Born: May 12, 1851 Jamaica, Vermont, U.S.
- Died: December 7, 1929 (aged 78) Montpelier, Vermont, U.S.
- Resting place: Green Mount Cemetery, Montpelier, Vermont, U.S.
- Party: Republican
- Spouse: Clara Laurette Hammond (m. 1879-1929, his death)
- Children: 2
- Education: Vermont Methodist Seminary, Montpelier, Vermont
- Profession: Lawyer

John H. Watson (May 12, 1851 – December 7, 1929) was a Vermont attorney and judge. He served as an associate justice of the Vermont Supreme Court from 1899 to 1917, and chief justice from 1917 to 1929.

== Biography ==
John Henry Watson was born in Jamaica, Vermont on May 12, 1851, the son of Asahel W. Watson and Adelphia (Jackson) Watson. He was raised and educated in Bradford, Vermont, and attended several academies, including the Vermont Methodist Seminary in Montpelier. He studied law in the office of attorney Orin Gambell of Bradford, attained admission to the bar in 1877, and practiced in Bradford.

== Start of career ==
In addition to practicing law, Watson became active in the Vermont National Guard; after initially serving as a lieutenant, in 1882 he was elected commander of a company called the Bradford Guards and promoted to captain. When the Bradford area's 1883 Ely Copper Mine strike turned violent, Watson's company was employed to restore order, and was credited with ending the fighting by capturing the rioters' gunpowder and weapons. He was later promoted to major as commander of 1st Battalion, 1st Vermont Infantry Regiment, and in 1895 he received promotion to lieutenant colonel. In 1898, Watson was elected to serve as commander of the 1st Vermont Infantry Regiment with the rank of colonel, but declined the position, which closed his military career.

A Republican, Watson served as State's Attorney of Orange County from 1886 to 1888, and was a member of the Vermont Senate from 1892 to 1894. He was a member of the board of directors of the Bradford Savings Bank and Trust Company, and a member of the Bradford Academy Board of Trustees.

== Career as a judge ==
In 1899, Jonathan Ross resigned as chief justice of the Vermont Supreme Court in order to accept appointment as a United States Senator. Associate Justice Russell S. Taft was promoted to chief justice, and Watson was appointed as an associate justice to fill the vacancy created by Taft's advancement. Watson served as an associate justice until 1917, when he succeeded Loveland Munson as chief justice, and was succeeded as an associate justice by Willard W. Miles. He served as chief justice until his death, and was succeeded by George M. Powers.

== Death and burial ==
Watson became a resident of Montpelier after joining the Supreme Court. He died at his Montpelier home on December 7, 1929, and was buried at Green Mount Cemetery in Montpelier.

== Family ==
In 1879, Watson married Clara Laurette Hammond a schoolteacher of Wardsboro, Vermont who graduated from the Vermont Normal School in Randolph and taught school before their wedding. They were the parents of two sons, John H. Watson Jr. (1883-1962), and Hugh Hammond Watson (1885-1947).

John H. Watson Jr. was a prominent attorney in Cleveland, Ohio. Hugh W. Watson was a career diplomat with the U.S. State Department whose postings included vice consul, deputy consul, and consul postings in: Three Rivers, Quebec; Yarmouth, Nova Scotia; Belfast, Ireland; Liverpool, England; Lyon, France; and Glasgow, Scotland.

== Sources ==
=== Newspapers ===
- "Major J. Gray Estey: He Will Command the Second Battalion". Vermont Phoenix. Brattleboro, Vermont. January 14, 1898 – via Newspapers.com.
- "Judge Ross Appointed by Gov. Smith as Successor to the Late Senator Morrill". The Burlington Free Press. Burlington, Vermont. January 12, 1899 – via Newspapers.com.
- "Chief Justice John H. Watson of Supreme Court Dead at 78". The Burlington Free Press. Burlington, Vermont. December 9, 1929 – via Newspapers.com.
- "Hold Funeral of Justice Watson: Head of Vermont Supreme Court is Laid to Rest in Green Mount Cemetery in Montpelier". The Burlington Free Press. Burlington, Vermont. December 11, 1929 – via Newspapers.com.
- "Weeks Names Powers Chief Justice, Thompson Associate". The Burlington Free Press. Burlington, Vermont. December 14, 1929 – via Newspapers.com.

=== Books ===
- Bigelow, Walter J. (1919). Vermont, Its Government. Montpelier, Vermont: Historical Publishing Company.
- Cutter, William Richard (1914). New England Families, Genealogical and Memorial. Vol. 4. New York: Lewis Historical Publishing Company.
- Ullery, Jacob G. (1894). Men of Vermont Illustrated. Brattleboro, Vermont: Transcript Publishing Company.
- Vermont State Government (1894). Vermont State Officers' Reports for 1893-94. Rutland, Vermont: The Tuttle Company.
- Vermont State Government (1896). Vermont State Officers' Reports for 1895-96. Rutland, Vermont: The Tuttle Company.
- Vermont State Normal School (1885). The Normal Register: A History of the First Vermont State Normal School. Montpelier, Vermont: Argus and Patriot Steam Job Printing.

=== Magazines ===
- Davenport, W. R. (March 1896). "Montpelier Seminary". The Vermonter. St. Albans, Vermont: Charles Spooner Forbes.

Political offices
Preceded by Russell S. Taft	Associate Justice of the Vermont Supreme Court; 1899–1917	Succeeded by Willard W. Miles
Preceded by Loveland Munson	Chief Justice of the Vermont Supreme Court; 1917–1929	Succeeded by George M. Powers
