= George N. Dale =

American attorney and politician from Vermont

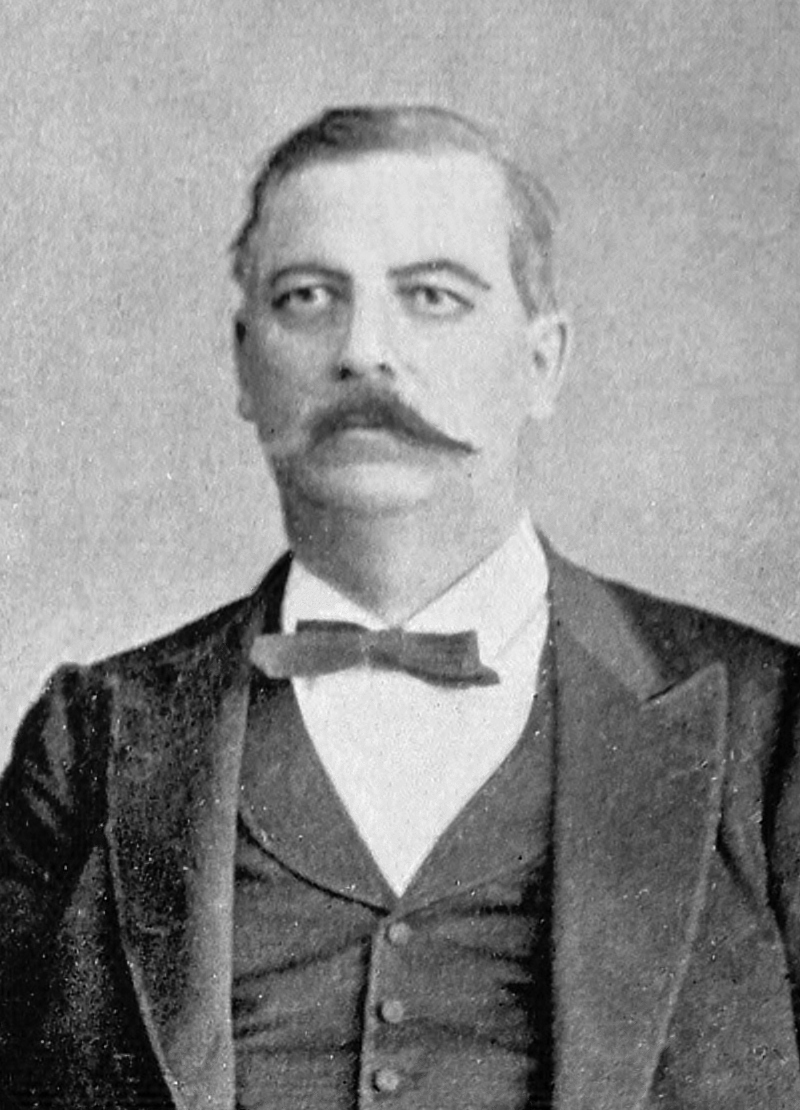

U.S. Consul for Coaticook, Quebec, Canada
- In office 1901–1902
- Preceded by: Jesse H. Johnson
- Succeeded by: Franklin D. Hale

Member of the Vermont Senate from Essex County
- In office 1894–1896
- Preceded by: Frederick A. Turner
- Succeeded by: James H. Beattie
- In office 1866–1870
- Preceded by: Lewis H. Tabor
- Succeeded by: John W. Hartshorn

Lieutenant Governor of Vermont
- In office 1870–1872
- Governor: John W. Stewart
- Preceded by: George W. Hendee
- Succeeded by: Russell S. Taft

President pro tempore of the Vermont Senate
- In office 1869–1870
- Preceded by: George W. Hendee
- Succeeded by: Charles H. Heath

Member of the Vermont House of Representatives from Guildhall
- In office 1860–1861
- Preceded by: William H. Hartshorn
- Succeeded by: Greenleaf Webb

State's Attorney of Essex County, Vermont
- In office 1857–1860
- Preceded by: William H. Hartshorn
- Succeeded by: Oscar F. Harvey

Personal details
- Born: February 19, 1834 Fairfax, Vermont, US
- Died: January 29, 1903 (aged 68) Island Pond, Vermont, US
- Resting place: Lakeside Cemetery, Island Pond, Vermont
- Party: Republican
- Spouse: Helen Hinman (m. 1863–1903, his death)
- Children: 3 (including Porter Hinman Dale)
- Profession: Attorney

George N. Dale (February 19, 1834 – January 29, 1903) was a Vermont lawyer and politician who served as the 28th lieutenant governor of Vermont from 1870 to 1872. He was the father of Porter Hinman Dale, who served as a member of the United States House of Representatives and as a United States Senator.

== Early life ==
George Needham Dale was born in Fairfax, Vermont, on February 19, 1834. He was raised in Waitsfield and attended Thetford Academy. He studied law with Paul Dillingham and became an attorney. Dale settled in Essex County, first in Guildhall, and later in Island Pond.

== Political career ==
A Republican, Dale served as Essex County State's Attorney from 1857 to 1860, and in the Vermont House of Representatives from 1860 to 1861.

In 1861, Dale was appointed Deputy U.S. Collector of Customs in Island Pond, and he served until 1866.

From 1866 to 1870, Dale served in the Vermont Senate, and was Senate President from 1869 to 1870.

Dale won election as Lieutenant Governor in 1870 and served the two years then available under the provisions of the Mountain Rule.

From 1872 to 1882, he again served as Deputy Collector of Customs in Island Pond.

In 1885, Dale became President of the Vermont Bar Association, serving until 1886.

Dale returned to the Vermont House in 1892, and he served in the Vermont Senate for the second time from 1894 to 1896.

In 1901, Dale was appointed U.S. Consul in Coaticook, Quebec, Canada, serving until 1902.

== Personal life ==
Dale married Helen Hinman in 1863 and had three children (one son, Porter Dale, and two daughters). He died in Island Pond on January 29, 1903.

Party political offices
Preceded by George Whitman Hendee	Republican nominee for Lieutenant Governor of Vermont; 1870	Succeeded by Russell S. Taft
Political offices
Preceded by George W. Hendee	Lieutenant Governor of Vermont; 1870–1872	Succeeded by Russell S. Taft
