= William Hebard =

American judge and politician (1800-1875)

Member of the U. S. House of Representatives from Vermont's 2nd congressional district
- In office March 4, 1849 – March 3, 1853
- Preceded by: Jacob Collamer
- Succeeded by: Andrew Tracy

Member of the Vermont House of Representatives from Chelsea
- In office 1858–1860
- Preceded by: Burnham Martin
- Succeeded by: William F. Dickinson
- In office 1864–1866
- Preceded by: Lyman G. Hinckley
- Succeeded by: Carlos Moore
- In office 1872–1874
- Preceded by: Lyman G. Hinckley
- Succeeded by: Asa A. Goodwin

Associate Justice of the Vermont Supreme Court
- In office 1842–1842
- Preceded by: Jacob Collamer
- Succeeded by: Daniel Kellogg
- In office 1844–1844
- Preceded by: Daniel Kellogg
- Succeeded by: Daniel Kellogg

Judge of Probate for the Randolph District of Orange County, Vermont
- In office 1839–1839
- Preceded by: Calvin Blodgett
- Succeeded by: Calvin Blodgett
- In office 1840–1842
- Preceded by: Calvin Blodgett
- Succeeded by: John Colby

Member of the Vermont Senate from Orange County
- In office 1836–1837
- Preceded by: None (position created)
- Succeeded by: Daniel Cobb
- In office 1838–1839
- Preceded by: Daniel Cobb
- Succeeded by: Jonathan Jenness

Member of the Vermont House of Representatives from Randolph
- In office 1835–1836
- Preceded by: Martin Flint
- Succeeded by: Sylvanus Blodgett
- In office 1840–1843
- Preceded by: Loren Griswold
- Succeeded by: None (Position left vacant)

State's Attorney of Orange County, Vermont
- In office 1832–1833
- Preceded by: Daniel Azro Ashley Buck
- Succeeded by: Daniel Azro Ashley Buck
- In office 1834–1835
- Preceded by: Daniel Azro Ashley Buck
- Succeeded by: Edmond Wrston
- In office 1836–1837
- Preceded by: Edmond Weston
- Succeeded by: Edmond Weston

Personal details
- Born: November 29, 1800 Windham, Connecticut, U.S.
- Died: October 20, 1875 (aged 74) Chelsea, Orange County, Vermont, U.S.
- Resting place: Old Cemetery, Randolph Center, Vermont
- Party: Whig (prior to 1855); Republican (after 1855)
- Spouse: Elizabeth Starkwether Brown (m. 1830–1875, his death)
- Children: 5
- Profession: Attorney

William Hebard (November 29, 1800 – October 20, 1875) was an American attorney and politician from Vermont. He served in several elected offices, and was most notable for representing Vermont in the United States House of Representatives for two terms (1849–1853).

Born in Hebard Windham, Connecticut, Hebard was raised in Randolph, Vermont. He taught school before attaining admission to the bar in 1827. While practicing in Randolph, Hebard was active in politics and government as a Whig, and the offices he held included state's attorney, probate judge, member of the Vermont House and Senate, and associate justice of the state supreme court. In 1845, Hebard moved to Chelsea, Vermont, where he continued to practice law. He was elected to Congress in 1848, and served two terms, 1849 to 1853. Hebard became a Republican when the party was founded in the 1850s, and represented Chelsea in the Vermont House several times in the 1850s, 1860s, and 1870s. He was also a delegate to the state constitutional convention in 1857, and the 1860 Republican National Convention.

Hebard continued to practice law almost until his death. He died in Chelsea, and was buried in Randolph Center's Old Cemetery.

== Early life ==
Hebard was born in Windham, Connecticut, one of seven children born to Diah Hebard (1757-1841) and Zerviah Hebert (or Ebert) (d. 1850). His parents moved to Randolph, Vermont when Hebard was a boy, and he was raised on the family farm in West Randolph. He attended the local schools of Randolph, and Randolph's Orange County Grammar School. Hebard taught school while he studied law with attorney William Nutting of Randolph, was admitted to the bar in 1827, and commenced practice in East Randolph, Vermont.

== Start of career ==
Hebard was long active in politics and government, and the offices he held while residing in Randolph included:

- State's attorney of Orange County from 1832 to 1833, 1834 to 1835, and 1836 to 1837.
- Member of the Vermont House of Representatives from Randolph from 1835 to 1836, and 1840 to 1843.
- Member of the Vermont Senate from Orange County from 1836 to 1837, and 1838 to 1839.
- Judge of Probate for Orange County's Randolph district from 1838 to 1839, and 1840 to 1842.
- Associate Justice of the Vermont Supreme Court in 1842, and again in 1844.

== U.S. Congressman ==
Hebard moved to Chelsea, Vermont in 1845. In 1848, he was elected to the United States House of Representatives as a Whig, and he served two terms, March 4, 1849 to March 3, 1853. In 1849, Hebard served on the state Council of Censors, the body which met every seven years to review actions of Vermont's government and ensure their constitutionality. While he practiced in Chelsea, the students who learned under Hebard's tutelage in preparation for legal careers of their own included Jonathan Ross.

== Later career ==
After leaving Congress, Hebard practiced law in partnership with Burnham Martin. By now a Republican, he was a delegate to the 1857 state constitutional convention, and served in the Vermont House of Representatives from Chelsea from 1858 to 1860, 1864 to 1866, and 1872 to 1874. He was also delegate to the 1860 Republican National Convention.

== Death ==
Hebard died in Chelsea on October 20, 1875. He was interred in Randolph Center's Old Cemetery.

== Family ==
In 1830, Hebard married Elizabeth Starkwether Brown (d. 1880), a niece and adopted daughter of Olivia Brown Chase and Dudley Chase. They were the parents of five children: Olivia (b. 1832), William (died at age seven), Salmon (1835-1894), George (1840-1879), and another son who was named William (b. 1845) following the death of his elder brother.

== Sources ==
=== Books ===
- Carleton, Hiram (1903). Genealogical and Family History of the State of Vermont. Vol. I. New York, NY: Lewis Publishing Company. ISBN 9780806347943.
- Child, Hamilton (1888). Gazetteer of Orange County, Vt., 1762-1888. Vol. Part I. Syracuse, NY: Syracuse Journal Company.
- Deming, Leonard (1851). Catalogue of the Principal Officers of Vermont. Middlebury, VT: L. Deming.
- Hemenway, Abby Maria (1871). The Vermont Historical Gazetteer. Vol. II. Burlington, VT: A. M. Hemenway.

=== Newspapers ===
- "Hon. William Hebard". Green Mountain Freeman. Montpelier, VT. October 27, 1875 – via Newspapers.com.

=== Internet ===
- Trutor, Barry. "Randolph Center Cemetery, Randolph". VOCA58.org. Burlington, VT: Vermont Old Cemetery Association.

U.S. House of Representatives
Preceded by Jacob Collamer	Member of the U.S. House of Representatives from Vermont's 2nd congressional district 1849-1853	Succeeded by Andrew Tracy
