= Robert E. Healy =

American judge (1883–1946)

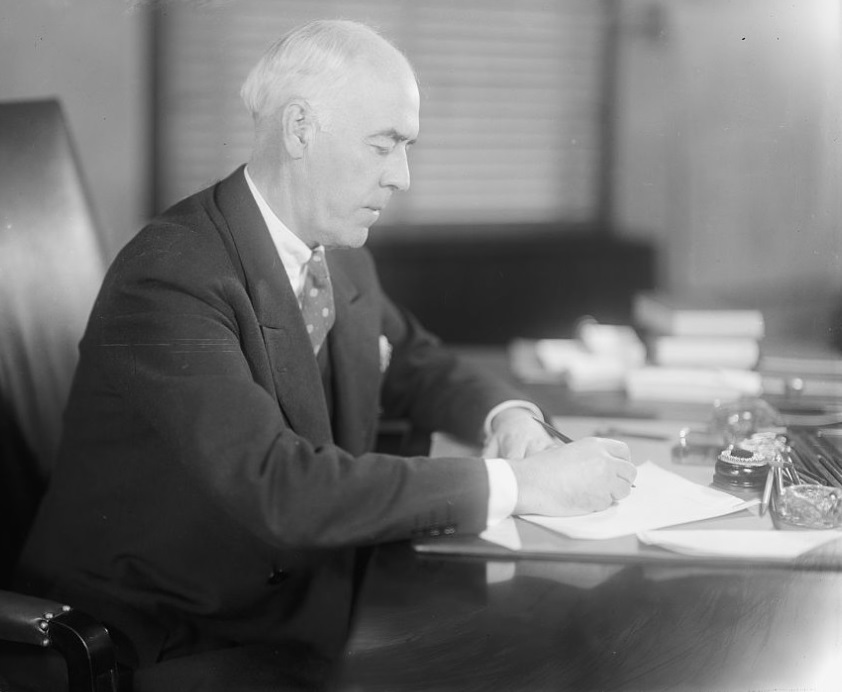
- Harris & Ewing photo, probably circa 1928, when Healy was chief counsel of the Federal Trade Commission

Member of the U.S. Securities and Exchange Commission
- In office July 2, 1934 – November 16, 1946
- President: Franklin D. Roosevelt; Harry S. Truman

Personal details
- Born: March 25, 1883 Bennington, Vermont, U.S.
- Died: November 16, 1946 (aged 63) Germantown, Pennsylvania, U.S.
- Resting place: Rock Creek Cemetery; Washington, D.C., U.S.
- Party: Republican

Robert E. Healy (March 25, 1883 – November 16, 1946) was a Vermont attorney and judge. He was notable as one of the original appointees to the Securities and Exchange Commission, where he served from 1934 to 1946. In addition, he served briefly as an associate justice of the Vermont Supreme Court from 1914 to 1915.

== Early life ==
Robert Emmett Healy was born in Bennington, Vermont on March 25, 1883. He graduated from Bennington High School in 1901, studied law with Orion M. Barber, and attained admission to the bar in 1904.

== Early career ==
Healy practiced law in partnership with Barber until 1910, when Barber became a federal judge. Healy then practiced as the partner of Edward H. Holden. A Republican, Healy served in local office including Bennington's town agent, town grand juror, member of the town library's board of trustees, and school auditor. Healy was a longtime member of the state Board of Bar Examiners beginning in 1909, and served as a trustee of Bennington College. He was also active in several businesses, including serving as treasurer of The Vermont Company, which operated interurban electric railroads between Bennington and North Adams, Massachusetts, and Bennington and Troy, New York. In addition, he served on the board of directors of the National Life Insurance Company.

In December 1914, Healy was nominated to serve as an associate justice of the Vermont Supreme Court, following the implementation of newly passed laws which reorganized Vermont's judiciary. He replaced Loveland Munson, who was not renominated because of his advanced age. In addition to Munson not being reappointed, longtime Associate Justice Seneca Haselton had also been denied another term on the court. Munson had also been overlooked when the Chief Justice position was last filled in 1913; he was the most senior justice, and by custom the longest serving member of the court became Chief Justice when a vacancy occurred. Public outcry over the treatment of Munson and Haselton led to the repeal of the court reorganization laws in January 1915. As part of the repeal, Chief Justice George M. Powers agreed to serve as an Associate Justice, enabling Munson to become chief justice. Leighton P. Slack agreed to return to the Vermont Superior Court, where he had served prior to his 1914 appointment to the Supreme Court. In addition, Healy agreed to end his service on the Supreme Court and withdraw his request for confirmation by the Vermont General Assembly, enabling Haselton to return as an associate justice.

== Continued career ==
After leaving the court, Healy continued to practice law in Bennington. From 1918 to 1919, he served as president of the Vermont Bar Association.

In 1928, Healy was appointed as chief counsel of the Federal Trade Commission. He served until 1934, and earned recognition for his investigations of utility holding companies and other corporations. Healy's work drew attention to stock price manipulation and other questionable business practices that had played a role in creating the Great Depression, and led to legislative and regulatory reforms designed to end the abuses.

Healy's work at the FTC resulted in his 1934 appointment as a member of the Securities and Exchange Commission. During this time he was the lead council in the FTC's investigation of the nation's electric industry. Healy was one of the commission's five original members, who included Joseph P. Kennedy Sr. (chairman), George C. Mathews, James M. Landis, and Ferdinand Pecora. He served until his death, and was the longest-tenured of the original commissioners.

== Death and burial ==
Healy died at his home in Germantown, Pennsylvania, outside of Philadelphia, on November 16, 1946. He was buried in Section 6, Lot 151 of Rock Creek Cemetery in Washington, DC.

== Family ==
In 1907, Healy married Sarah S. Houlihan (or Holihan) (1878-1966) of Bennington and Cohoes, New York. They had no children.

== Honors ==
In 1933, Healy was awarded the honorary degree of LL.D. by the University of Vermont.

== Sources ==
=== Internet ===
- Johnson, Steve (January 16, 2017). "Rock Creek Cemetery, Washington, District of Columbia: Surnames Hea-Hix". Interment.net. Menifee, CA: Clear Digital Media, Inc.
- "Past Presidents of the Vermont Bar Association" (PDF). Vtbar.org. Montpelier, VT: Vermont Bar Association. 2013. Archived from the original (PDF) on 2015-01-18.
- "Bennington College Board of Trustees". Crossett Library. Bennington, VT: Bennington College. 2002.
- Securities and Exchange Commission (2017). "SEC Historical Summary of Chairmen and Commissioners". SEC.gov/. Washington, DC: U.S. Securities and Exchange Commission.
- "Sarah Holihan Healy in the U.S. Social Security Applications and Claims Index, 1936-2007". Ancestry.com. Provo, UT: Ancestry.com, LLC. 1966.

=== Newspapers ===
- "Few Surprises at Annual Town Meeting". Bennington Banner. Bennington, VT. March 4, 1908 – via Newspapers.com.
- "The Court Appointments". Burlington Free Press. Burlington, VT. September 24, 1913 – via Newspapers.com.
- "Court Re-Organization". Burlington Free Press. Burlington, VT. December 5, 1914 – via Newspapers.com.
- "Supreme Court is Elected Without Any Opposition". Burlington Free Press. Burlington, VT. January 28, 1915 – via Newspapers.com.
- "Healy and Slack". Bennington Banner. Bennington, VT. February 2, 1915 – via Newspapers.com.
- "R. Healy, Bennington, Chosen Chief Counsel". Burlington Free Press. Burlington, VT. Associated Press. January 27, 1928 – via Newspapers.com.
- "New Director for National Life Co". The Evening Journal. Wilmington, DE. September 7, 1932 – via Newspapers.com.
- "U.V.M. Sends Out 220 Graduates". Burlington Free Press. Burlington, VT. June 20, 1933 – via Newspapers.com.
- "Robert E. Healy on Securities and Exchange Commission". Burlington Free Press. Burlington, VT. July 2, 1934 – via Newspapers.com.
- "Robert E. Healy Dies, SEC Commissioner". Philadelphia Inquirer. Philadelphia, PA. November 18, 1946 – via Newspapers.com.
- "Bennington Native, SEC Member, Dies". Troy Times-Record. Troy, NY. November 18, 1946 – via Newspapers.com.

=== Books ===
- Crockett, Walter Hill (1923). Vermont, The Green Mountain State. Vol. 5. New York, NY: Century History Company.
- Fifield, James Clark (1921). The American Bar. New York, NY: James C. Fifield Company.
- Funigiello, Philip J. (1973). Toward a National Power Policy. Pittsburgh, PA: University of Pittsburgh Press. p. 18. ISBN 978-0-8229-3263-5.
- Marquis, Albert Nelson (1944). Who's Who in America. Vol. 23. Chicago, IL: A. N. Marquis.
- U.S. House of Representatives (1943). Hearing Records. Vol. 2. Washington, DC: US Government Printing Office.
- Vermont Legislative Council (1917). State of Vermont Legislative Directory. Montpelier, VT: Vermont Legislative Council.
- Vermont Public Service Commission (1914). Biennial Report of the Public Service Commission of the State of Vermont. Bellows Falls, VT: P. H. Gobie Press.

Political offices
Preceded by Loveland Munson	Associate Justice of the Vermont Supreme Court; 1914–1915	Succeeded by Seneca Haselton
Preceded by None (Position created)	Member of the Securities and Exchange Commission; 1934–1946	Succeeded by Harry A. McDonald
