= Loveland Munson =

American judge

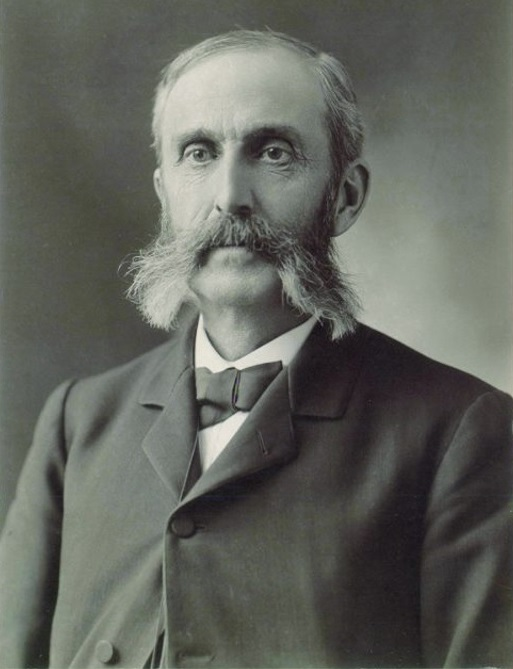
- Manchester (Vermont) Historical Society c. 1906

Chief Justice of the Vermont Supreme Court
- In office 1915–1917
- Preceded by: George M. Powers
- Succeeded by: John H. Watson

Associate Justice of the Vermont Supreme Court
- In office 1890–1914
- Preceded by: Wheelock G. Veazey
- Succeeded by: Robert E. Healy

Probate Judge of the Manchester, Vermont District
- In office 1883–1889
- Preceded by: Ranney Howard
- Succeeded by: Elias B. Burton

President pro tempore of the Vermont Senate
- In office 1878–1880
- Preceded by: William W. Grout
- Succeeded by: Philip K. Gleed

Member of the Vermont Senate from Bennington County
- In office 1878–1880 Serving with William B. Arnold
- Preceded by: J. Henry Guild, Silas Mason
- Succeeded by: Charles Thatcher, Gilber M. Sykes

Member of the Vermont House of Representatives from Manchester
- In office 1882–1884
- Preceded by: David S. Wilson
- Succeeded by: William H. Fullerton
- In office 1872–1876
- Preceded by: Mason S. Colburn
- Succeeded by: Sewell W. Bourn

Personal details
- Born: July 21, 1843 Manchester, Vermont, U.S.
- Died: March 24, 1921 (aged 77) Manchester, Vermont, U.S.
- Resting place: Dellwood Cemetery, Manchester, Vermont, U.S.
- Party: Republican
- Spouse: Mary Burton Campbell (m. 1882)
- Education: Burr and Burton Academy
- Profession: Attorney

Loveland Munson (July 21, 1843 – March 24, 1921) was a Vermont attorney, politician and judge who served as President of the Vermont Senate and Chief Justice of the Vermont Supreme Court.

== Biography ==
Loveland Munson was born in Manchester, Vermont on July 21, 1843, the son of son of Cyrus and Lucy (Loveland) Munson. He attended the local schools and graduated from Burr and Burton Academy in 1862. Munson edited the Manchester Journal newspaper from 1863 to 1866 while studying law with Elias B. Burton, was admitted to the bar in 1866, and practiced with Burton in Manchester as the firm of Burton & Munson.

A Republican, Munson served as Manchester's Town Clerk from 1866 to 1873, and Bennington County's Register of Probate from 1866 to 1876.

In 1872 and 1874 Munson was elected to the Vermont House of Representatives. In 1878 he won election to the Vermont Senate and was chosen as that body's President pro tempore, serving until 1880. In 1882 Munson returned to the Vermont House, and in 1883 he was appointed as the Manchester District's Judge of Probate. In 1889 Munson was appointed to a vacancy on the Vermont Supreme Court. He was elected to the post in 1890 and served until 1914, when he was not reappointed due to his age, and was replaced by Robert E. Healy. His retirement lasted only a month; public outcry led the Vermont General Assembly to return Munson to the bench in January 1915 with appointment as chief justice.

While serving as a justice of the Court, Munson authored the opinion in the well-known torts case Ploof v. Putnam. In 1904 the plaintiff, Ploof, had been sailing on Lake Champlain when a storm suddenly arose. Fearing for the safety of his boat and passengers, he put in at Putnam's dock. Putnam's servant untied Ploof's boat, and Ploof's family was injured and his boat damaged in the storm. The Vermont Supreme Court held that Putnam, the dock owner, was liable for damage and injuries caused by his employee while the employee was acting on the employer's behalf.

Munson served as chief justice until 1917. He died in Manchester on March 24, 1921, and was buried in Manchester's Dellwood Cemetery.

Political offices
| Preceded by William W. Grout | President pro tempore of the Vermont Senate; 1878–1880 | Succeeded by Philip K. Gleed |
