= Homer Elihu Royce =

American lawyer, politician and jurist (1819–1891)

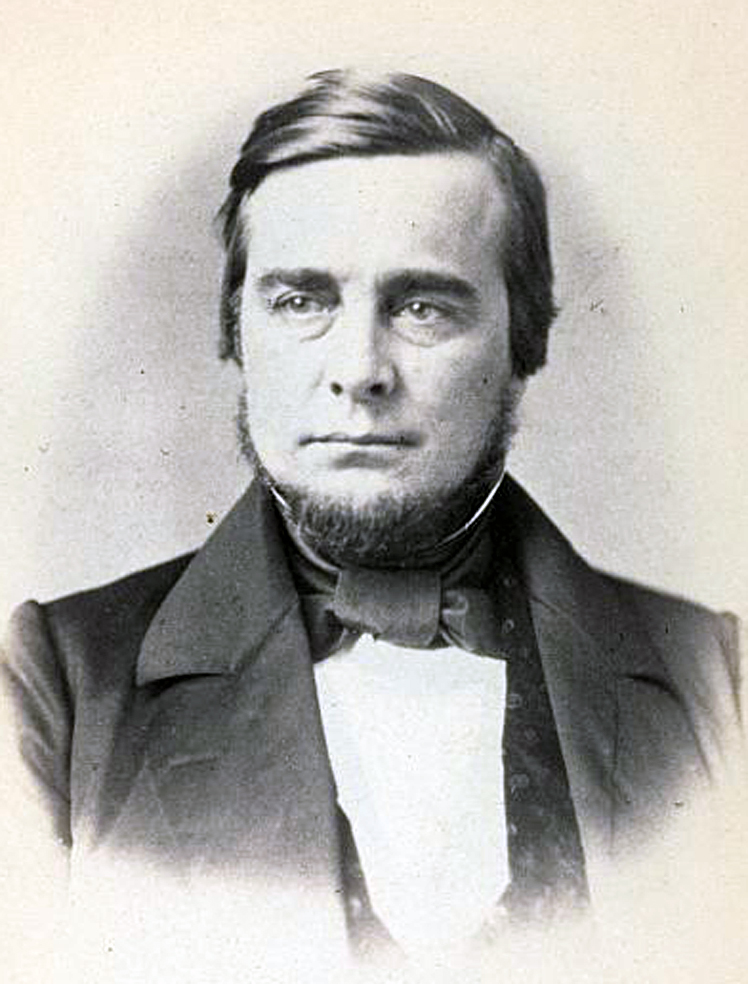

Member of the United States House of Representatives from Vermont's 3rd district
- In office March 4, 1857 – March 3, 1861
- Preceded by: Alvah Sabin
- Succeeded by: Portus Baxter

Member of the Vermont House of Representatives
- In office 1846–1847

Personal details
- Born: June 14, 1819 Berkshire, Vermont, US
- Died: April 24, 1891 (aged 71) St. Albans, Vermont, US
- Resting place: Calvary Cemetery, East Berkshire
- Party: Whig (before 1855); Republican
- Spouse: Mary T. Edmunds
- Relations: Stephen Royce (uncle)
- Children: 3
- Education: University of Vermont
- Profession: Lawyer

Homer Elihu Royce (June 14, 1819 – April 24, 1891) was an American lawyer, politician and jurist. From 1857 to 1861, he served two terms in the U.S. House of Representatives.

== Early life ==
Royce was born in Berkshire, Vermont, the son of Elihu Marvin and Sophronia (Parker) Royce. His uncle Stephen Royce who served as Vermont Chief Justice and Governor. Homer Royce was educated in the district schools and at academies in St. Albans and Enosburgh. He studied law with Thomas Child, was admitted to the bar in 1844, and partnered with Thomas Child, Jr. for several years in his hometown. The University of Vermont awarded him the honorary degrees of Master of Arts in 1851, and Doctor of Laws (LL.D.) in 1882. He married, January 23, 1851, Mary T. Edmunds, of Boston, Massachusetts, with whom he had three children.

== Politics ==
He was state's attorney for Franklin County in 1846 and 1847, and represented Berkshire in the Vermont House of Representatives the latter year as well. He was a district delegate to the Whig National Convention in 1847. In 1849, 1850, 1851, 1861 and 1868, he was elected to the Vermont Senate from Franklin County.

=== Congress ===
In 1856 he was elected by a majority of 5,960 votes as a Republican Party representative to Congress from the Third district, becoming the youngest member of the Vermont contingent in Washington. He served two terms, from March 4, 1857 to March 3, 1861. During his first term he was a member of the Foreign Affairs Committee. He won a second term by a majority of 4,129 votes. During his second term, he wrote a part of the Foreign Affairs Committee report opposing annexation of Cuba, and delivered a speech in opposition to President James Buchanan's Cuban policy. Senator Jacob Collamer spoke out against the acquisition as well.

=== Later career ===
Royce did not run for a third term. He returned to his law practice until he was elected as an associate justice in the Vermont Supreme Court in 1870, succeeding William C. Wilson. He was appointed chief justice in 1882, succeeding John Pierpoint, and John W. Rowell was appointed to the resulting associate justice vacancy. Royce served as chief justice until 1890, when he resigned.

== Death and burial ==
Royce died in St. Albans, and is interred in Calvary Cemetery, East Berkshire.

== Sources ==
- United States Congress. "Homer Elihu Royce (id: R000488)". Biographical Directory of the United States Congress.
- Crockett, Walter Hill. Vermont The Green Mountain State, The Century History Company, Inc., New York, 1921, iii:366, 450, 453-454, 462, 467, 470.
- Dodge, Prentiss C., Encyclopedia Vermont Biography, Burlington, VT: Ullery Publishing Company, 1912, p. 74.
- Ullery, Jacob G., compiler, Men of Vermont: An Illustrated Biographical History of Vermonters and Sons of Vermont, Brattleboro, VT: Transcript Publishing Company, 1894, Part I, p. 155-156, 183-184.
- Homer E. Royce at Vermont in the Civil War

U.S. House of Representatives
Preceded by Alvah Sabin	Member of the U.S. House of Representatives from Vermont's 3rd congressional district 1857-1861	Succeeded by Portus Baxter
