= Edward Cowles (psychiatrist) =

American psychiatrist

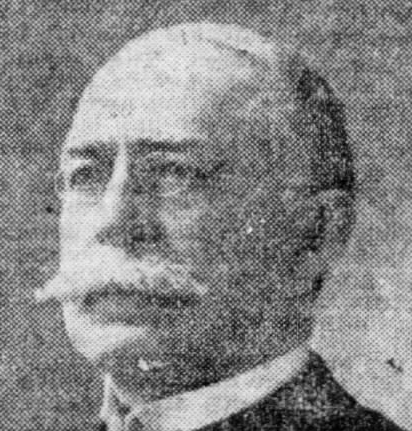
- Born: 1836 or 1837; Peacham, Vermont
- Died: July 25, 1919 (aged 82); Plymouth, Massachusetts
- Education: Dartmouth College; College of Physicians and Surgeons
- Occupation: Psychiatrist
- Employers: Boston City Hospital; McLean Hospital

Edward Cowles (1836/1837 – July 25, 1919), an American psychiatrist, was the medical superintendent of the McLean Hospital in Massachusetts from 1879 to 1903. He was among the first hospital superintendents to advocate for hospital functions that encompassed patient treatment, research, and teaching.

== Biography ==
Cowles was born in Peacham, Vermont, into a civic-minded family. His father served for many years in the state legislature. Cowles was educated in the local public schools, and attended Dartmouth College. He earned his A.B. in 1859 and his M.A. in 1861. He attended medical school at the College of Physicians and Surgeons and obtained his M.D. in 1863. He served a few months at the Hartford Retreat in Connecticut and then entered the U.S. Army until 1872. Following the Civil War, he was in charge of an Army hospital.

Returning to Boston in 1872, he became Superintendent of the Boston City Hospital for seven years, where his Army experience influenced the organization and the administration of the hospital. During his tenure, the hospital built several wards, improved the ventilation in the wards, and established the first training school for hospital nurses. In 1879, he was invited to take the post of Superintendent of the McLean Asylum, where he remained until 1903.

The McLean Asylum, renamed the McLean Hospital in 1892, was the first mental hospital in Charlestown, Massachusetts. The State Legislature issued a charter in 1811 to build a general hospital and an asylum for mentally-ill patients. The Asylum opened in 1818, three years before the general hospital. In 1895, it moved to Belmont, a Boston suburb. The first superintendent was Rufus Wyman (1818-1835), followed by Luther Bell (1836-1855 and 1857-1858) and John Tyler (1858-1871). Cowles became Superintendent in 1879.

The original hospital organizers were aware of the British Quaker approach to mental illness called "moral treatment". This approach was used at McLean throughout its history and changed with advances in medicine. During his tenure, Cowles introduced many improvements in patient care based upon moral treatment. He removed bars from the windows in some wards, changed the name of "boarders" to "patients", increased recreational and occupational activities for patients, and started the first training school for nurses in a mental hospital. Moreover, he introduced research activities in the hospital, and added a pathology laboratory in 1888, a chemistry laboratory in 1900, and a physiological psychology laboratory in 1904.

Cowles was a gifted administrator and opened advances in psychiatry. In 1887, during a leave of absence, he spent several months at the Johns Hopkins Hospital in Baltimore to study psychology with Dr. Stanley Hall. He was a professor at Dartmouth (1895-1914), and a clinical instructor at Harvard Medical School (1889-1914). In 1890, Dartmouth conferred Cowles with an honorary L.L.D. He gave lectures at Clark University, where he was a member of the board of trustees. He was active in professional organizations including the Boston Society of Psychiatry and Neurology, the American Neurological Association, and the American Medico-Psychological Association (later, the American Psychiatric Association), where he served as president from 1895 to 1896. Throughout his career, he believed strongly that psychiatry was part of medicine.

In 1903, the McLean hospital Board of Trustees voted a mandatory retirement age of 64, and Cowles retired. He moved to Plymouth, Massachusetts, and opened his practice in Boston. He continued to lecture despite increasing deafness. He died in Plymouth on July 25, 1919.

== Works ==
- Cowles, Edward. "The Advancement of Psychiatry in America," The American Journal of Insanity 52(3) (January 1896): 364-386.
- Cowles, Edward. "On the Treatment of the Sick in Tents and Temporary Hospitals," The Boston Medical and Surgical Journal 91(1) (July 1874): 1-8.
- Cowles, Edward. "The Problem of Psychiatry in the Functional Psychoses," The American Journal of Insanity 62(2) (October 1905): 189-237.
- Cowles, Edward. Neurasthenia and its Mental Symptoms … Read before the Massachusetts Medical Society, June 9, 1891. Boston: D. Clapp & Son, 1891.
- Cowles, Edward. "The Laboratories of the McLean Hospital for Research in Pathological Psychology and Biochemistry," in Hurd, Henry M. [et al.], The Institutional Care of the Insane in the United States and Canada. Baltimore: Johns Hopkins, 1916-1917. https://archive.org/details/39002086344158.med.yale.edu
