= John W. Rowell =

American judge (1835–1924)

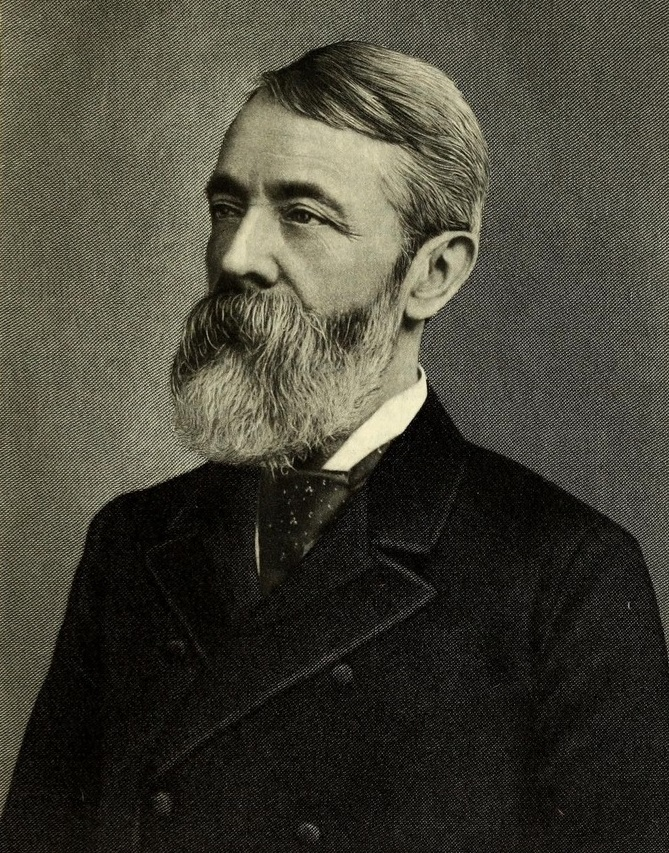
- From Volume 5 of 1923's Vermont, the Green Mountain State

Chief Justice of the Vermont Supreme Court
- In office 1902–1913
- Preceded by: Russell S. Taft
- Succeeded by: George M. Powers

Associate Justice of the Vermont Supreme Court
- In office 1882–1902
- Preceded by: Homer E. Royce
- Succeeded by: Seneca Haselton

Member of the Vermont Senate
- In office 1874–1876 Serving with William T. George
- Preceded by: William R. Shedd, Lyman G. Hinckley
- Succeeded by: John Lynde, Edmund P. George
- Constituency: Orange County

State's Attorney of Orange County, Vermont
- In office 1862–1864
- Preceded by: Roswell Farnham
- Succeeded by: Samuel M. Gleason

Member of the Vermont House of Representatives
- In office 1861–1863
- Preceded by: Ziba Sprague
- Succeeded by: Lyman L. Wheeler
- Constituency: Randolph

Personal details
- Born: June 9, 1835 Lebanon, New Hampshire, U.S.
- Died: February 13, 1924 (aged 88) Randolph, Vermont, U.S.
- Resting place: South View Cemetery, Randolph, Vermont, U.S.
- Party: Republican
- Spouse: Mary L. Wheeler (m. 1858)
- Education: West Randolph Academy, Randolph, Vermont, U.S.
- Profession: Attorney

John W. Rowell (June 9, 1835 – February 13, 1924) was a Vermont attorney and businessman. He is notable for his service as an associate justice of the Vermont Supreme Court from 1882 to 1902, and chief justice from 1902 to 1913.

== Early life ==
John W. Rowell was born in Lebanon, New Hampshire on June 9, 1835. He was raised in Randolph, Vermont, educated in the schools of Randolph, and graduated from West Randolph Academy. In 1856 he began to study law in the office of Jefferson P. Kidder; after Kidder moved from Vermont, Rowell continued to study in the office of Judge Edmund Weston. Rowell also attended a course of instruction at the Ohio State and Union Law College of Poland, Ohio.

== Start of career ==
Rowell was admitted to the bar in 1858, and began to practice in Randolph as the partner of Judge John B. Hutchinson. He was a longtime member of the board of directors of the Northfield Bank, and was also active with the Randolph National Bank as a vice president and director. A Republican, Rowell served in the Vermont House of Representatives from 1861 to 1863. From 1862 to 1864 he served as state's attorney of Orange County.

After his partnership with John B. Hutchinson was dissolved in 1866, Rowell practiced alone in Randolph until 1870, when he moved to Chicago to practice as the partner of John Hutchinson, who was notable for his service as U.S. Consul in Nice, France and Secretary of the Dakota Territory. In September 1871, Rowell decided to return to Randolph and continue practicing law.

== Later career ==
From 1872 to 1880 Rowell was the reporter of decisions for the Vermont Supreme Court. In 1874, Rowell was elected to the Vermont Senate, where he served one term and was chairman of the Judiciary Committee and the committee that oversaw operations at the state asylum for the insane.

In 1882, Vermont Chief Justice John Pierpont died and Associate Justice Homer E. Royce was appointed to succeed him. Governor Roswell Farnham then appointed Rowell to succeed Royce as an associate justice. Rowell served until 1902, when he was named to succeed Russell S. Taft as chief justice. He served as chief justice until retiring in 1913, and was succeeded by George M. Powers.

== Honors ==
In 1893, Rowell received the honorary degree of LL.D. from the University of Vermont. In 1913 he received an LL.D. from Middlebury College.

== Retirement and death ==
After retiring, Rowell continued to reside in Randolph, where he died on February 13, 1924. He was buried at South View Cemetery in Randolph.

== Family ==
In 1858, Rowell married Mary L. Wheeler (1832–1919), the daughter of Reverend Leonard Wheeler and Hannah (Gilman) Wheeler of Randolph. They had no children.

== Sources ==
=== Newspapers ===
- "Mrs. John W. Rowell Dies". The Burlington Free Press. Burlington, VT. January 29, 1919 – via Newspapers.com.
- "John W. Rowell is Dead at 88". Burlington Free Press. Burlington, VT. February 14, 1924 – via Newspapers.com.

=== Books ===
- Dodge, Prentiss Cutler (1912). Encyclopedia of Vermont Biography. Burlington, VT: Ullery Publishing Company. p. 87.
- Ullery, Jacob G. (1894). "Men of Vermont Illustrated". Brattleboro, VT: Transcript Publishing Company.

Political offices
Preceded by Homer E. Royce	Associate Justice of the Vermont Supreme Court; 1882–1902	Succeeded by Seneca Haselton
Preceded by Russell S. Taft	Chief Justice of the Vermont Supreme Court; 1902–1913	Succeeded by George M. Powers
