= Seneca Haselton =

American judge (1848–1921)

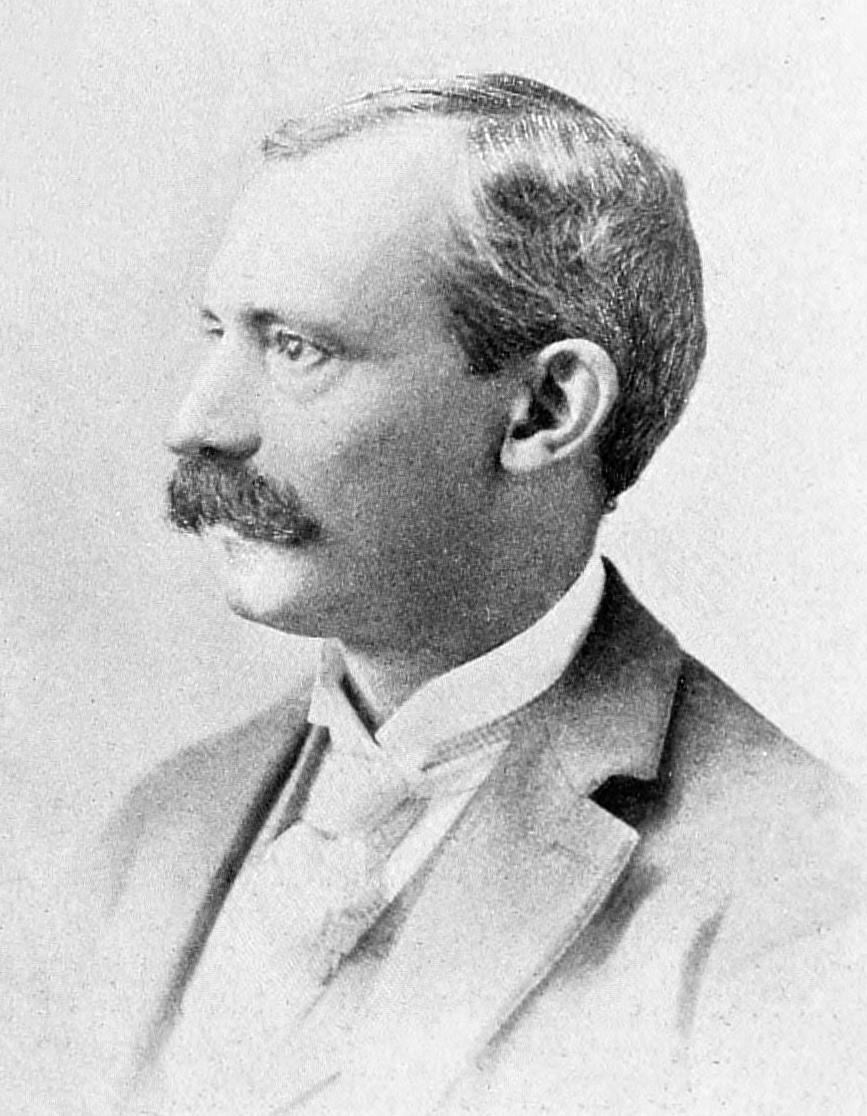
- From 1894's Men of Vermont Illustrated

Associate Justice of the Vermont Supreme Court
- In office 1908–1919
- Preceded by: James Manning Tyler
- Succeeded by: Leighton P. Slack
- In office 1902–1906
- Preceded by: John W. Rowell
- Succeeded by: None (Size of court reduced)

Chief Judge of the Vermont Superior Court
- In office 1906–1908
- Preceded by: Position created
- Succeeded by: George M. Powers

U.S. Minister to Venezuela
- In office 1894–1895
- Appointed by: Grover Cleveland
- Preceded by: Frank C. Partridge
- Succeeded by: Allen Thomas

Mayor of Burlington, Vermont
- In office 1891–1894
- Preceded by: William A. Crombie
- Succeeded by: William J. Van Patten

Member of the Vermont House of Representatives from Burlington
- In office 1886–1887
- Preceded by: Curtis A. Hibbard
- Succeeded by: Henry Ballard

Judge of the Burlington, Vermont City Court
- In office 1878–1886
- Preceded by: Milton R. Tyler
- Succeeded by: William H. Hare

Personal details
- Born: February 26, 1848 Westford, Vermont, U.S.
- Died: July 21, 1921 (aged 73) Burlington, Vermont, U.S.
- Resting place: Lakeview Cemetery, Burlington, Vermont
- Party: Democratic
- Education: University of Vermont; University of Michigan Law School
- Profession: Lawyer

Seneca Haselton (February 26, 1848 – July 21, 1921) was a Vermont educator, attorney and politician. He is notable for his service as mayor of Burlington, Vermont (1891–1894), U.S. Minister to Venezuela (1894–1895), and an associate justice of the Vermont Supreme Court (1902–1906, 1908–1919).

A graduate of the University of Vermont and University of Michigan Law School, Haselton practiced law in Burlington beginning in 1875. A Democrat in an era when the Republicans controlled all facets of Vermont's statewide politics, Haselton found success at the local level, including terms as city court judge (1878–1886), member of the Vermont House of Representatives (1886–1887), and Burlington mayor (1891 to 1894). In 1894, Haselton was appointed U.S. Minister to Venezuela, and he served until 1895, when President Grover Cleveland requested his resignation as part of resolving a dispute between Haselton and the commander of the U.S. Navy's North Atlantic Squadron.

After serving as Reporter of Decisions for the Vermont Supreme Court (1900–1902), in 1902 he was appointed to the court as an associate justice. Haselton served until 1906, when the size of the Supreme Court was reduced. From 1906 to 1908, he served as Chief Judge of the newly created Vermont Superior Court. In what came to be a custom that lasted until the 1970s, the chief judge was chosen by seniority from the Superior Court judges, and advanced to the Supreme Court when a vacancy arose. In 1908, Haselton was reappointed to the Vermont Supreme Court. In December 1914, he was one of the justices who were not reappointed as part of a court reorganization plan; public outcry led to the plan being revoked in January 1915, and Haselton maintained his place as an associate justice until retiring in 1919.

Haselton never married or had children. He died in Burlington in 1921, and was buried at Lakeview Cemetery in Burlington.

== Early life ==
Seneca Haselton was born in Westford, Vermont on February 26, 1848, the son of Reverend Amos Haselton and Amelia (Frink) Haselton. He was educated in Jericho and Underhill, and attended academies in Underhill and Barre in preparation for enrollment at the University of Vermont. Haselton graduated from UVM with a Bachelor of Arts degree in 1871, and received a Master of Arts degree in 1874. He taught school in several Vermont towns from 1871 to 1873, and was an instructor in mathematics at the University of Michigan while attending law school.

Haselton studied briefly at a Burlington law firm in 1873, and then attended the University of Michigan Law School. He was a student from 1874 to 1875, and received his ll.b. degree in 1875. He was admitted to the bar the same year, and commenced practice in Burlington.

== Start of career ==
Haselton was a Democrat, and became active in Vermont politics at a time when the Republican Party was in control of every major office and every facet of state government. Despite his party affiliation, he attained success at the local level with election as Burlington's city court judge, a position he held from 1878 to 1886. He served in the Vermont House of Representatives from 1886 to 1887, and was mayor of Burlington from 1891 to 1894. In April 1892, Haselton appointed Patrick J. Cosgrove to the police force; Cosgrove became chief of police in September 1931.

== Later career ==
In 1894, President Grover Cleveland appointed Haselton as U.S. Minister to Venezuela. He served from July 1894 to May 1895, when he returned to Vermont after Cleveland requested his resignation. Haselton was asked to leave his post following a dispute with Admiral Richard Worsam Meade, the commander of the U.S. Navy's North Atlantic Squadron. In Meade's version, Haselton was ineffective in Caracas because he was drinking to excess during the workday. In Haselton's, Meade broke diplomatic protocol by rushing past Haselton to greet Venezuelan President Joaquín Crespo at a public event before Haselton could properly introduce him, and then continued one-on-one conversations with Crespo about policy matters without including Haselton.

From 1900 to 1902, Haselton was the Reporter of Decisions for the Vermont Supreme Court. In 1902, Associate Justice John W. Rowell was appointed as Chief Justice of the Vermont Supreme Court, and Haselton was appointed to fill the Associate Justice vacancy that resulted. He served until 1906, when a newly passed law reduced the size of the Supreme Court from seven justices to four. From 1906 to 1908, Haselton was the chief judge of the Vermont Superior Court. In 1908, Associate Justice James Manning Tyler retired from the state Supreme Court, and Haselton was named to fill the vacancy. He served until he was not reappointed in late 1914. His retirement lasted less than a month, because public outcry led to Associate Justice Robert E. Healy withdrawing his request for confirmation by the Vermont General Assembly, enabling the legislature to reappoint Haselton in January 1915. He served until he retired in 1919.

== Civic and professional memberships ==
Haselton was a member of the Selden Society and the American Society of International Law. He also belonged to the Vermont Historical Society and the Algonquin Club of Burlington. Haselton was a founder and the first vice president of the Green Mountain Club, the creators of Vermont's Long Trail. He was also a member of the Vermont State Library's board of trustees, and served on the Vermont Board of Bar Examiners.

== Death and burial ==
In retirement, Haselton was a resident of Burlington. He died there on July 21, 1921, and was buried at Lakeview Cemetery in Burlington.

== Family ==
Haselton never married, and had no children. Through his mother, Haselton was a descendant of John Eliot, a missionary in the Massachusetts Bay Colony who was famed as the "Apostle to the Indians".

== Legacy ==
In 1909, the University of Vermont conferred on Haselton the honorary degree of LL.D.

The Green Mountain Club's Haselton Trail is a hiking route from Smugglers Notch to the summit of Mount Mansfield. Haselton was a noted hiker and outdoorsman, and performed most of the labor that created the trail.

== Sources ==
=== Newspapers ===
- "Minister Haselton's Troubles". Akron Daily Democrat. Akron, OH. May 24, 1895 – via Newspapers.com.
- "Many Degrees Passed Out". Fitchburg Sentinel. Fitchburg, MA. Jun 30, 1909 – via Newspapers.com.
- "Patrick J. Cosgrove Appointed Chief of Police, Succeeding Late Patrick J. Russell". The Burlington Free Press. September 14, 1931. p. 6 – via Newspapers.com.
- "Supreme Court is Elected Without Any Opposition". Burlington Free Press. Burlington, VT. January 28, 1915. p. 13 – via Newspapers.com.
- "The Green Mountain Club was organized in Burlington". Vermont Phoenix. Brattleboro, VT. March 18, 1910 – via Newspapers.com.
- "Judge Haselton Dies at Age of 73". Burlington Free Press. Burlington, VT. July 22, 1921 – via Newspapers.com.
- "Many Pay Tribute: State Well Represented at Funeral of Late Judge Haselton". Burlington Free Press. Burlington, VT. July 25, 1921 – via Newspapers.com.

=== Books ===
- Carleton, Hiram (1903). Genealogical and Family History of the State of Vermont. New York, NY: Lewis Publishing Company.
- Jeffords, James M. (2003). An Independent Man: Adventures of a Public Servant. New York, NY: Smon & Schuster. p. 64. ISBN 978-0-7432-2843-5.

Political offices
Preceded by James Manning Tyler	Associate Justice of the Vermont Supreme Court; 1908–1919	Succeeded by Leighton P. Slack
Preceded by John W. Rowell	Associate Justice of the Vermont Supreme Court; 1902–1906	Succeeded by None (Size of court reduced)
Preceded by Frank C. Partridge	U.S. Minister to Venezuela; 1894–1895	Succeeded by Allen Thomas
Preceded by William A. Crombie	Mayor of Burlington, Vermont; 1891–1894	Succeeded by William J. Van Patten
