= William W. Henry =

American Civil War Medal of Honor recipient

William Wirt Henry
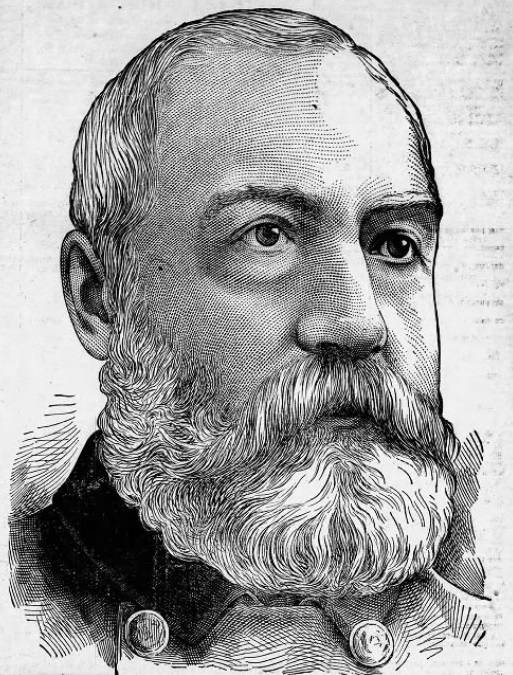
- Bellows Falls Times, October 2, 1897
- Born: November 21, 1831; Waterbury, Vermont
- Died: August 31, 1915 (aged 83); Burlington, Vermont
- Burial place: Lakeview Cemetery, Burlington, Vermont
- Military career
- Allegiance: United States; Union
- Branch: United States Army; Union Army
- Service years: 1861, 1862 - 1865
- Rank: Colonel; Brevet Brigadier General
- Commands: 10th Vermont Infantry
- Conflicts: American Civil War
- Awards: Medal of Honor

William Wirt Henry (November 21, 1831 – August 31, 1915) was a manufacturer and a colonel in the Union Army during the American Civil War. He was a recipient of the brevet grade of brigadier general of volunteers and the Medal of Honor for gallantry in action.

== Early life ==
Henry was born in Waterbury, Vermont. He was the son of James Madison and Matilda (Gale) Henry. He taught in a school in his hometown for one year, then caught 'gold fever,' and moved to California in 1851. He served as constable in White Oak, El Dorado County, California, in 1856. He returned to Vermont in 1857 and joined his father's business manufacturing pharmaceuticals.

Henry married on August 5, 1857, Mary Jane Beebe, daughter of Lyman and Mary (Sherman) Beebe of Waterbury, Vermont. They had five children. Mary Jane died in 1871, and Henry married Valeria (Lillie) Heaton, daughter of Timothy and Susan (White) Heaton of Waterbury.

== Civil War ==
He was commissioned first lieutenant of Company D, 2nd Vermont Infantry, on May 20, 1861, but resigned on November 5, 1861, for medical reasons. He rejoined his father's business and returned to the Washington area, selling drugs to sutlers and military surgeons. He then accepted a position as major of the 10th Vermont Infantry on August 26, 1862. He was promoted to lieutenant colonel on October 17, 1862, and assumed command of the regiment as colonel on April 26, 1864, replacing Albert B. Jewett, who had resigned. He commanded his regiment in the battles of the Wilderness, Spotsylvania, North Anna, Totopotomy Creek, Cold Harbor, and Cedar Creek.

He was wounded in action six times, slightly at Cold Harbor on June 3, 1864, and Monocacy on July 9, 1864, and was hit four times at Cedar Creek on October 19, 1864. Due to his wounds and other medical reasons, he resigned his commission on December 17, 1864 and was mustered out of the volunteer service. His departure from the regiment was "greatly regretted by the officers and men, and their personal regard and regret found expression in a highly complimentary parting testimonial signed by all but two of the officers of the regiment. In this paper, they also requested Colonel Henry to carry home with him and present to the Legislature of Vermont the tattered colors of the regiment, under which no less than twenty of the color guard had been killed or wounded."

After Henry was mustered out of the Union Army, on March 7, 1865, President Abraham Lincoln nominated Henry for appointment to the brevet grade of brigadier general, to rank from March 7, 1865, and the U.S. Senate confirmed the appointment on March 9, 1865.

On December 21, 1892, he received the Medal of Honor for his actions at Cedar Creek, "though suffering from severe wounds, rejoined his regiment and led it in a brilliant charge, recapturing the guns of an abandoned battery."

== Postwar life ==
After he returned from war, Henry rejoined the family business which included, over the years, manufacturing and wholesaling of drugs, first in Waterbury, and then in Burlington, Vermont.

Henry served as a state senator from Washington County from 1865 to 1868, and from Chittenden County in 1888–1889. He served as mayor of Burlington from 1887 to 1889, succeeding George H. Morse and being succeeded by Seneca Haselton. He was appointed United States Marshal on April 10, 1879, replacing George P. Foster. He served until June 24, 1886, when he was succeeded by John Robinson. In 1892, he was appointed U.S. Immigration Inspector. From 1897 until 1907, he was the American Consul in Quebec City.

He became a Mason in 1858 and was a member of the I.O.O.F, the Grand Army of the Republic, the Military Order of the Loyal Legion of the United States, the Society of the Army of the Potomac and the Knights of Pythias.

Henry died at the age of 83, and is buried at Lakeview Cemetery in Burlington, Vermont.

== Medal of Honor citation ==
Rank and organization: Colonel, 10th Vermont Infantry. Place and date: At Cedar Creek, Va., October 19, 1864. Entered service at: Waterbury, Vt. Born: November 21, 1831, Waterbury, Vt. Date of issue: December 21, 1892.

Citation:

Though suffering from severe wounds, rejoined his regiment and let it in a brilliant charge, recapturing the guns of an abandoned battery.

== See also ==
- List of American Civil War Medal of Honor recipients: G–L
- List of Medal of Honor recipients for the Battle of Cedar Creek
- Vermont in the Civil War
