= Congregational Church of Chelsea =

Historic church in Vermont, United States

- U.S. National Register of Historic Places
- U.S. Historic district – Contributing property
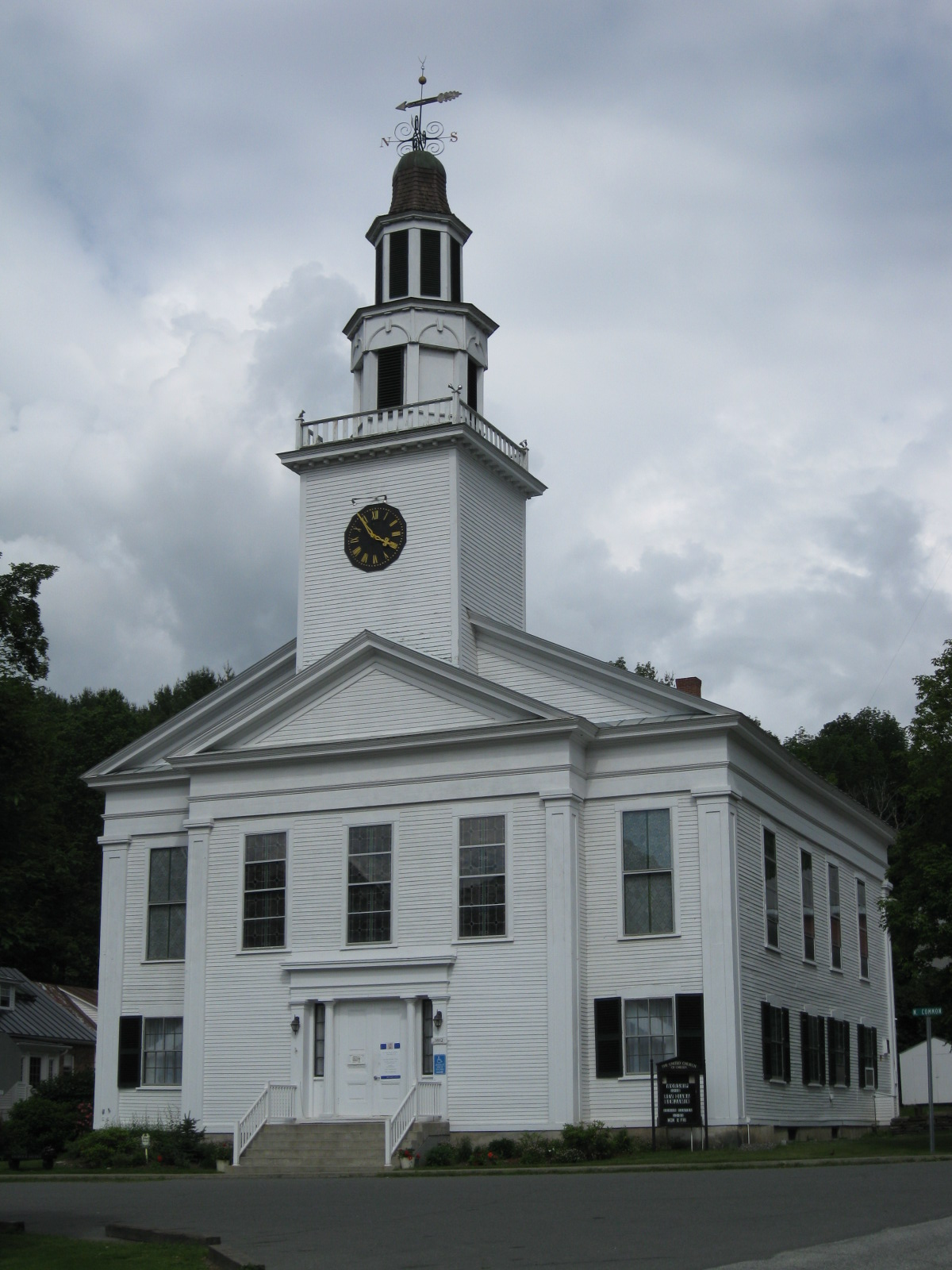
- Front of the church

- Location within Vermont Location within the United States
- Interactive map showing the location of Congregational Church of Chelsea
- Location: Chelsea Green, Chelsea, Vermont
- Coordinates: 43°59′19″N 72°26′48″W
- Area: less than one acre
- Built: 1811
- Architect: Asher Benjamin
- Architectural style: Greek Revival
- Part of: Chelsea Village Historic District (ID83003212)
- NRHP reference No.: 76000140

Significant dates
- Added to NRHP: September 03, 1976
- Designated CP: September 29, 1983

The United Church of Chelsea, previously the Congregational Church of Chelsea, is a historic church on Chelsea Green in Chelsea, Vermont. Built 1811–1813 with later stylistic additions, it is a fine example of Federal period architecture with Greek Revival alterations. Originally built for a Congregationalist group, it now serves as a union church, affiliated with the United Church of Christ. It was listed on the National Register of Historic Places in 1976.

== Description and history ==
The United Church of Chelsea stands in the center of Chelsea Village, at the eastern end of its northern green. It is a two-story wood-frame structure, with a gabled roof, clapboarded exterior, and granite foundation. The main facade is five bays wide, with the center bays in shallow projecting section topped by a lower gable. Building corners are pilastered, rising to a broad entablature. A multistage tower rises, straddling the projection and main roofline, with a square first stage surmounted by a low balustrade, an octagonal belfry with louvered openings on four sides, and a smaller octagonal section capped by a bellcast roof and weathervane. The interior was originally built with a three-sided gallery, but this was enclosed to make a full second story in the 1840s as part of a major restyling.

Built in 1811–1813 as the Chelsea Congregational Church, it has since then been a high-profile fixture in Chelsea's village. Its design is derived from plates in Asher Benjamin's The Architect's Companion, with major Greek Revival additions occurring in 1848. The Congregationalists merged with the local Methodist congregation in 1929 to form the United Church, which continues to use the building today.

== See also ==
- National Register of Historic Places listings in Orange County, Vermont
