= 1968 Vermont gubernatorial election =

- November 5, 1968
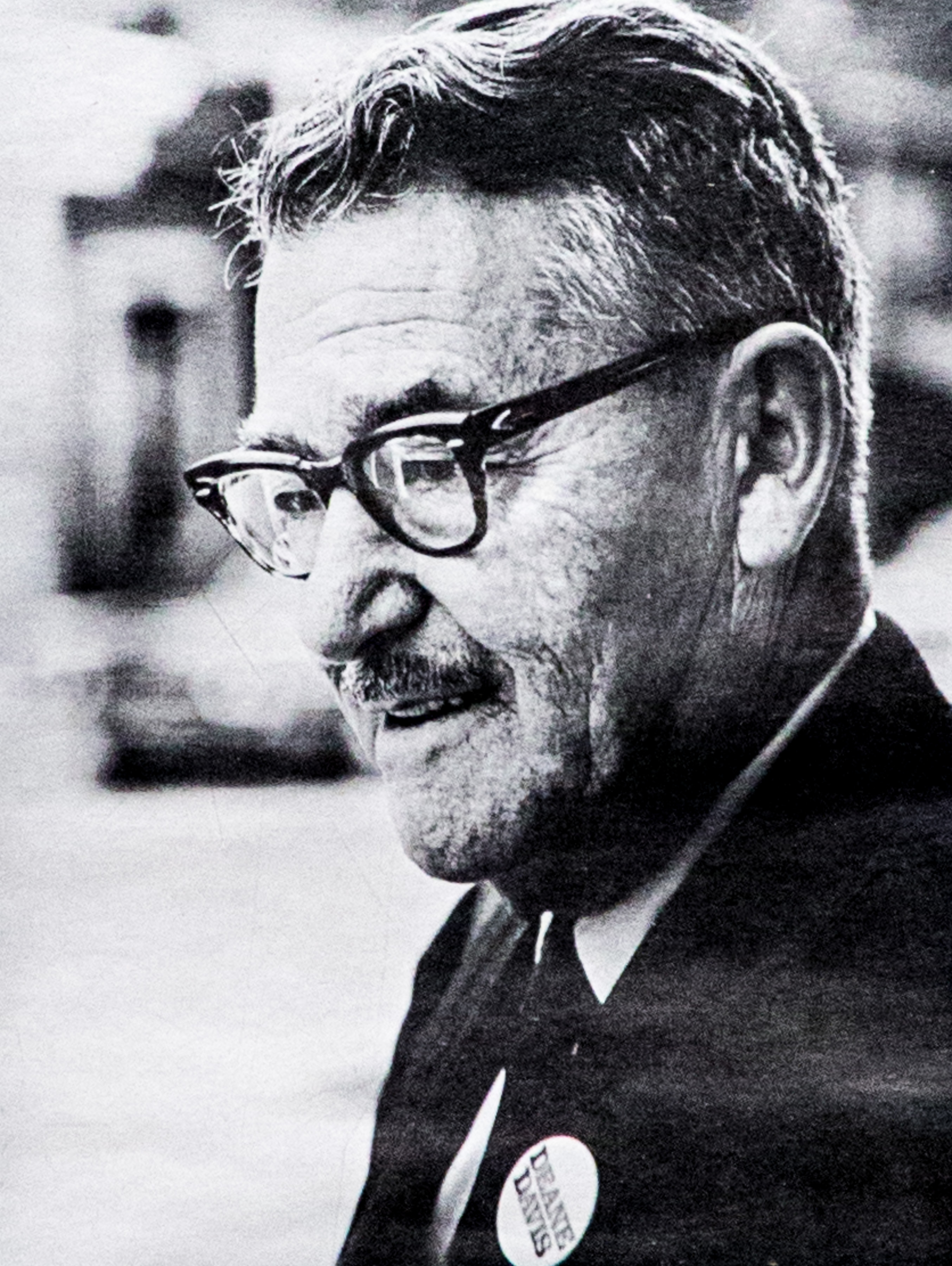

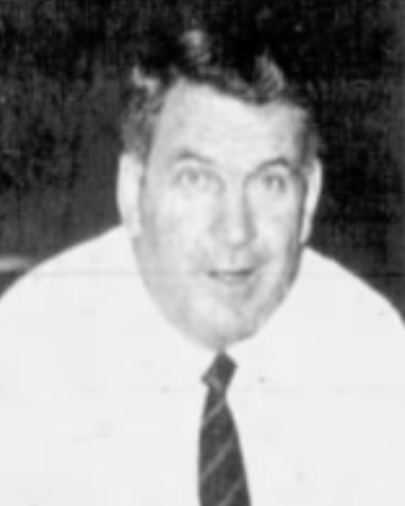
Nominee	Deane C. Davis	John J. Daley
Party	Republican	Democratic
Popular vote	89,387	71,656
Percentage	55.49%	44.48%
- Davis: 50–60% 60–70% 70–80% 80–90% >90% Daley: 50–60% 60–70% 70–80% 80–90% Tie: 50%
Governor before election
Philip H. Hoff
Democratic
Elected Governor
Deane C. Davis
Republican

The 1968 Vermont gubernatorial election took place on November 5, 1968. Incumbent Democrat Philip H. Hoff did not run for re-election to another term as Governor of Vermont. Republican candidate Deane C. Davis defeated Democratic candidate John J. Daley to succeed him.

== Democratic primary ==
=== Results ===
Democratic primary results
Party	Candidate	Votes	%	±%
Democratic	John J. Daley	10,641	97.7	
Democratic	Other	256	2.3	
Total votes		10,897	100.0	

== Republican primary ==
=== Results ===
Republican primary results
Party	Candidate	Votes	%	±%
Republican	Deane C. Davis	36,719	62.7	
Republican	James L. Oakes	21,791	37.2	
Republican	Other	30	0.1	
Total votes		58,540	100.0	

== General election ==
=== Results ===
1968 Vermont gubernatorial election
Party	Candidate	Votes	%	±%
Republican	Deane C. Davis	89,387	55.49	
Democratic	John J. Daley	71,656	44.48	
N/A	Other	46	0.03	
Total votes		161,089	100.0	
