= Harold C. Sylvester =

American judge (1903–1988)

- Born: April 27, 1903; Eden, Vermont, United States
- Died: July 15, 1988 (aged 85); Burlington, Vermont, United States
- Burial place: Resurrection Park Cemetery, South Burlington, Vermont
- Education: Saint Michael's College
- Occupations: attorney, politician, judge
- Known for: Vermont Superior and Supreme Courts
- Political party: Republican
- Spouse: Gertrude Cecile Foy (m. 1936)
- Children: 2 sons, 1 daughter
- Parents: Leonard I. Sylvester (father); Geneva L. (Sullivan) (mother)

Harold C. Sylvester (April 27, 1903 – July 15, 1988) was a Vermont attorney, politician, and judge. He was most notable for his long service on the Vermont Superior Court, and as an associate justice of the Vermont Supreme Court from 1963 to 1964.

== Early life ==
Harold Charles Sylvester was born in Eden, Vermont on April 27, 1903, the son of Geneva L. (Sullivan) and farmer Leonard I. Sylvester. He was educated in Eden and Johnson, and graduated from Johnson High School. Sylvester attended Saint Michael's College for two years, and then began the study of law in the Morisville offices of William E. Tracy and Frederick G. Fleetwood. Sylvester was admitted to the bar in 1927, and began a practice in St. Albans.

== Start of career ==
A Republican, while practicing in St. Albans, Sylvster served in local office including city attorney and member of the city council. He served as assistant secretary of the Vermont Senate from 1943 to 1945, and secretary of civil and military affairs (chief assistant) for Governor Mortimer R. Proctor from 1946 to 1947. In 1948, Sylvester was elected to the Vermont House of Representatives, and he was reelected in 1950 and 1952. In his second and third terms, Sylvester was chairman of the House Appropriations Committee.

Sylvester served on the board of directors of the Howard Bank and the Swanton Savings Bank and Trust Company. He was also a member of the board of directors for the St. Albans Hospital. From 1946 to 1947 he was president of the Vermont Bar Association.

== Judicial career ==
In 1953, Governor Lee E. Emerson appointed Sylvester as a judge of the Vermont Superior Court. He advanced by seniority to become the court's chief judge in 1959, and he continued to serve until his appointment to the Vermont Supreme Court.

Governor Philip H. Hoff appointed Sylvester as an associate justice of the Vermont Supreme Court in 1963, in keeping with the tradition of naming the senior judges of the superior court to the supreme court as vacancies arose. Sylvester filled the vacancy caused by the promotion of James Stuart Holden to Chief Justice, and he served as an associate justice until 1964, when he requested return to the superior court, saying that he preferred trial work to appellate work. Hoff obliged Sylvester by appointing superior court Judge F. Ray Keyser Sr. to the supreme court as Sylvester's replacement, and Sylvester to the superior court vacancy created by Keyser's promotion.

Sylvester remained on the superior court until retiring in 1972. After leaving the bench, Sylvester practiced law in Burlington until retiring in the early 1980s.

== Death and burial ==
Sylvester died in Burlington on July 15, 1988. He was buried at Resurrection Park Cemetery in South Burlington.

== Family ==
In 1936, Sylvester married Gertrude Cecile Foy, who was usually called Cecile. They were the parents of sons Harlan and Alan, and daughter Gail. Harlan Sylvester pursued a career as a financial services consultant, and has provided economic advice to a succession of Vermont governors beginning with Thomas P. Salmon. Alan Sylvester became an attorney, and specialized in personal injury, medical malpractice, and product liability lawsuits. Gail Sylvester became the wife of Edward Cashman, who served as a judge of the Vermont Superior Court from 1982 to 2007. She pursued a career as an emergency room nurse, and later became a consultant on medical ethics.

== Sources ==
=== Newspapers ===
- "Wedding Announcements: Diane Hedley-Alan F. Sylvster". Burlington Free Press. Burlington, VT. June 29, 1964 – via Newspapers.com.
- "Sylvester Resigns Superior Bench Post". Burlington Free Press. Burlington, VT. Free Press Capitol Bureau. January 11, 1972 – via Newspapers.com.
- "Obituary, Harold C. Sylvester". Burlington Free Press. Burlington, VT. July 16, 1988 – via Newspapers.com.
- "Jurist Harold Sylvester Dies". Burlington Free Press. Burlington, VT. July 16, 1988 – via Newspapers.com.
- "Weddings/Celebrations: Brooke Cashman, Thomas Bollyky". The New York Times. New York, NY. July 8, 2011.

=== Internet ===
- Hopkins, B. M., St. Albans (VT) City Clerk (January 12, 1936). "Harold Charles Sylvester and Gertrude Cecile Foy in the Vermont Marriage Records, 1909-2008". Ancestry.com. Provo, UT: Ancestry.com, LLC.
- "Biography, Judge Edward Cashman". Division of Education & Human Studies: Our Faculty. Burlington, VT: Champlain College.

=== Books ===
- Armstrong, Harold E. (1953). Vermont Legislative Directory. Montpelier, VT: Vermont Secretary of State.

Political offices
Preceded by James Stuart Holden	Justice of the Vermont Supreme Court; 1963–1964	Succeeded by F. Ray Keyser Sr.
