= 1964 Vermont gubernatorial election =

- November 3, 1964
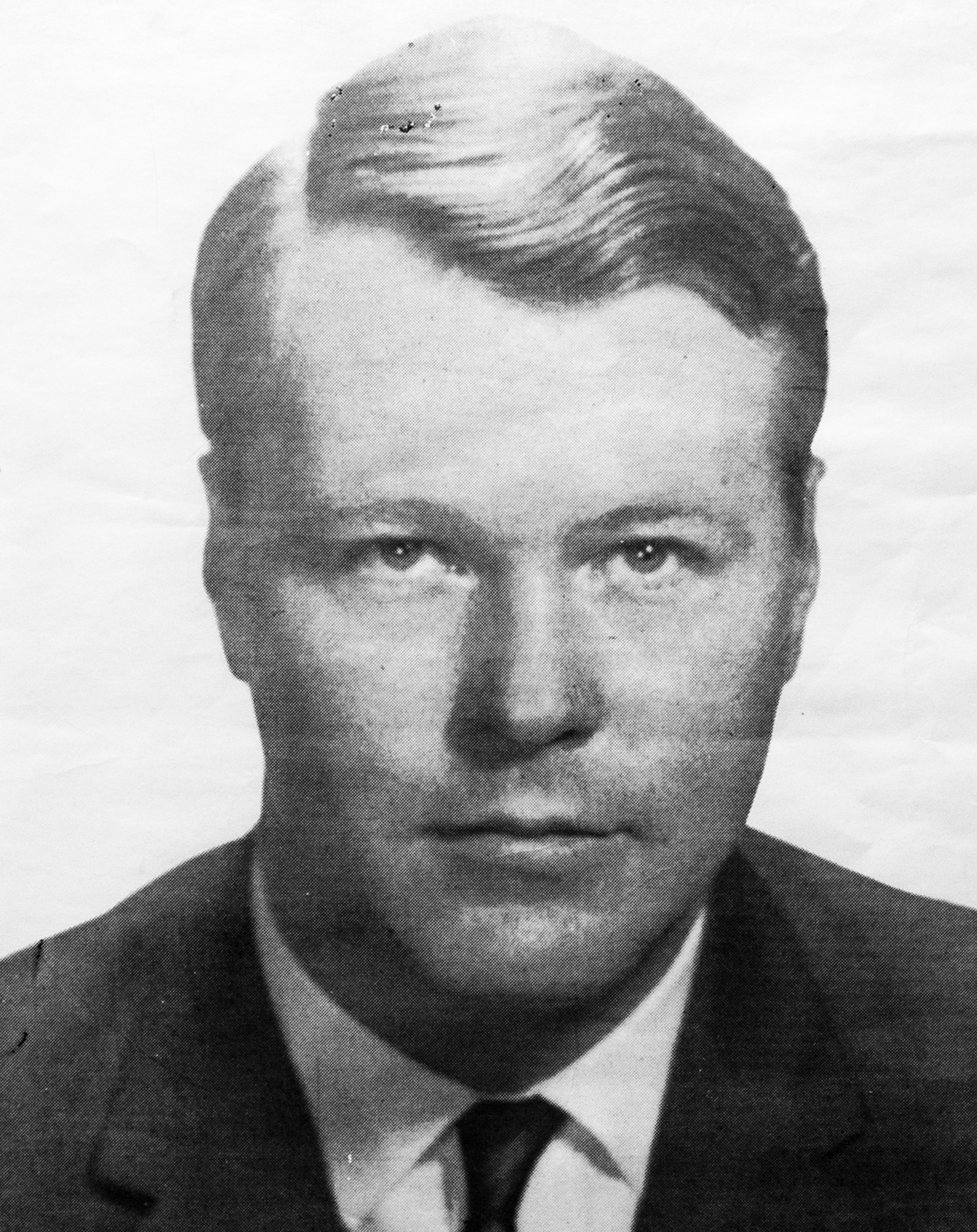

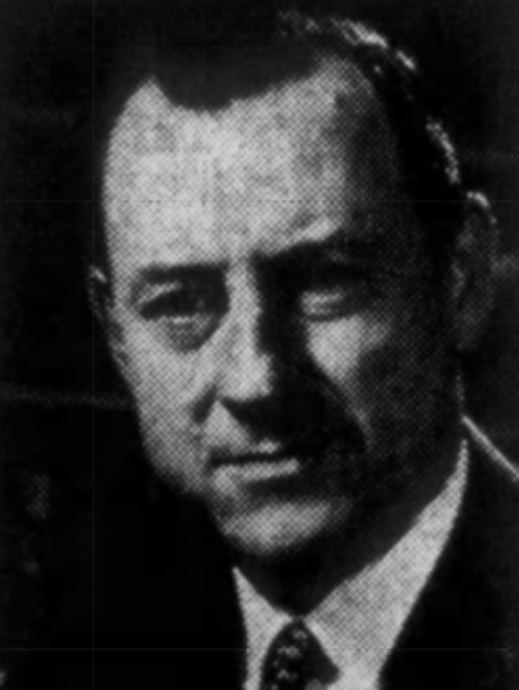
Nominee	Philip H. Hoff	Ralph A. Foote
Party	Democratic	Republican
Popular vote	106,611	57,576
Percentage	64.93%	35.06%
- County results Hoff: 50–60% 60–70% 70–80%
Governor before election
Philip H. Hoff
Democratic
Elected Governor
Philip H. Hoff
Democratic

The 1964 Vermont gubernatorial election took place on November 3, 1964. Incumbent Democrat Philip H. Hoff ran successfully for re-election to a second term as Governor of Vermont, defeating Republican candidate Ralph A. Foote.

== Democratic primary ==
=== Results ===
Democratic primary results
Party	Candidate	Votes	%	±%
Democratic	Philip H. Hoff (inc.)	17,566	99.8	
Democratic	Other	36	0.2	
Total votes		17,602	100.0	

== Republican primary ==
=== Results ===
Republican primary results
Party	Candidate	Votes	%	±%
Republican	Ralph A. Foote	19,121	42.8	
Republican	Robert S. Babcock	16,225	36.3	
Republican	Roger MacBride	9,265	20.7	
Republican	Other	81	0.2	
Total votes		44,692	100.0	

== General election ==
=== Results ===
1964 Vermont gubernatorial election
Party	Candidate	Votes	%	±%
Democratic	Philip H. Hoff (inc.)	106,611	64.93	
Republican	Ralph A. Foote	56,485	34.40	
Independent	Ralph A. Foote	1,074	0.65	
No party	Ralph A. Foote	17	0.01	
Total	Ralph A. Foote	57,576	35.06	
N/A	Other	12	0.01	
Total votes		164,199	100.0	
