= 1946 Vermont gubernatorial election =

- November 5, 1946
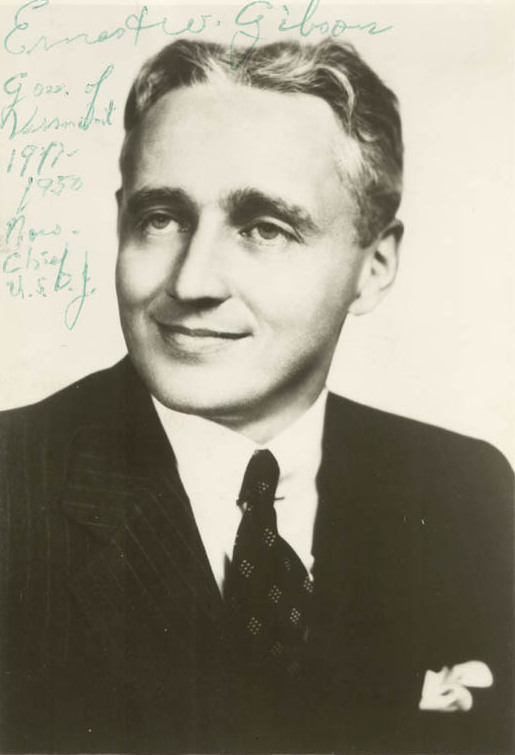

Nominee	Ernest W. Gibson Jr.	Berthold C. Coburn
Party	Republican	Democratic
Popular vote	57,849	14,096
Percentage	80.30%	19.56%
- Gibson: 50–60% 60–70% 70–80% 80–90% 90-100% Coburn: 50–60% Tie: 50% No Vote/Data
Governor before election
Mortimer R. Proctor
Republican
Elected Governor
Ernest W. Gibson Jr.
Republican

The 1946 Vermont gubernatorial election took place on November 5, 1946. Incumbent Republican Mortimer R. Proctor ran unsuccessfully for re-election to a second term as Governor of Vermont, losing to Ernest W. Gibson, Jr. in the Republican primary. Gibson defeated Democratic candidate Berthold C. Coburn in the general election.

== Republican primary ==
Results by county Gibson: 50–60% 60–70% 70–80% Proctor: 50–60%

=== Results ===
Republican primary results
Party	Candidate	Votes	%	±%
Republican	Ernest W. Gibson, Jr.	32,197	57.0	
Republican	Mortimer R. Proctor (inc.)	24,192	43.0	
Republican	Other	2	0.0	
Total votes		56,389	100.0	

== Democratic primary ==
=== Results ===
Democratic primary results
Party	Candidate	Votes	%	±%
Democratic	Berthold C. Coburn	2,065	97.9	
Democratic	Other	44	2.1	
Total votes		2,109	100.0	

== General election ==
=== Candidates ===
- Ernest W. Gibson, Jr., Secretary of the Vermont Senate
- Berthold C. Coburn, member of the Democratic Party State Committee

=== Results ===
1946 Vermont gubernatorial election
Party	Candidate	Votes	%	±%
Republican	Ernest W. Gibson, Jr.	57,849	80.30	
Democratic	Berthold C. Coburn	14,096	19.56	
N/A	Other	99	0.14	
Total votes		72,044	100.0	
