= 1970 Vermont gubernatorial election =

- November 3, 1970
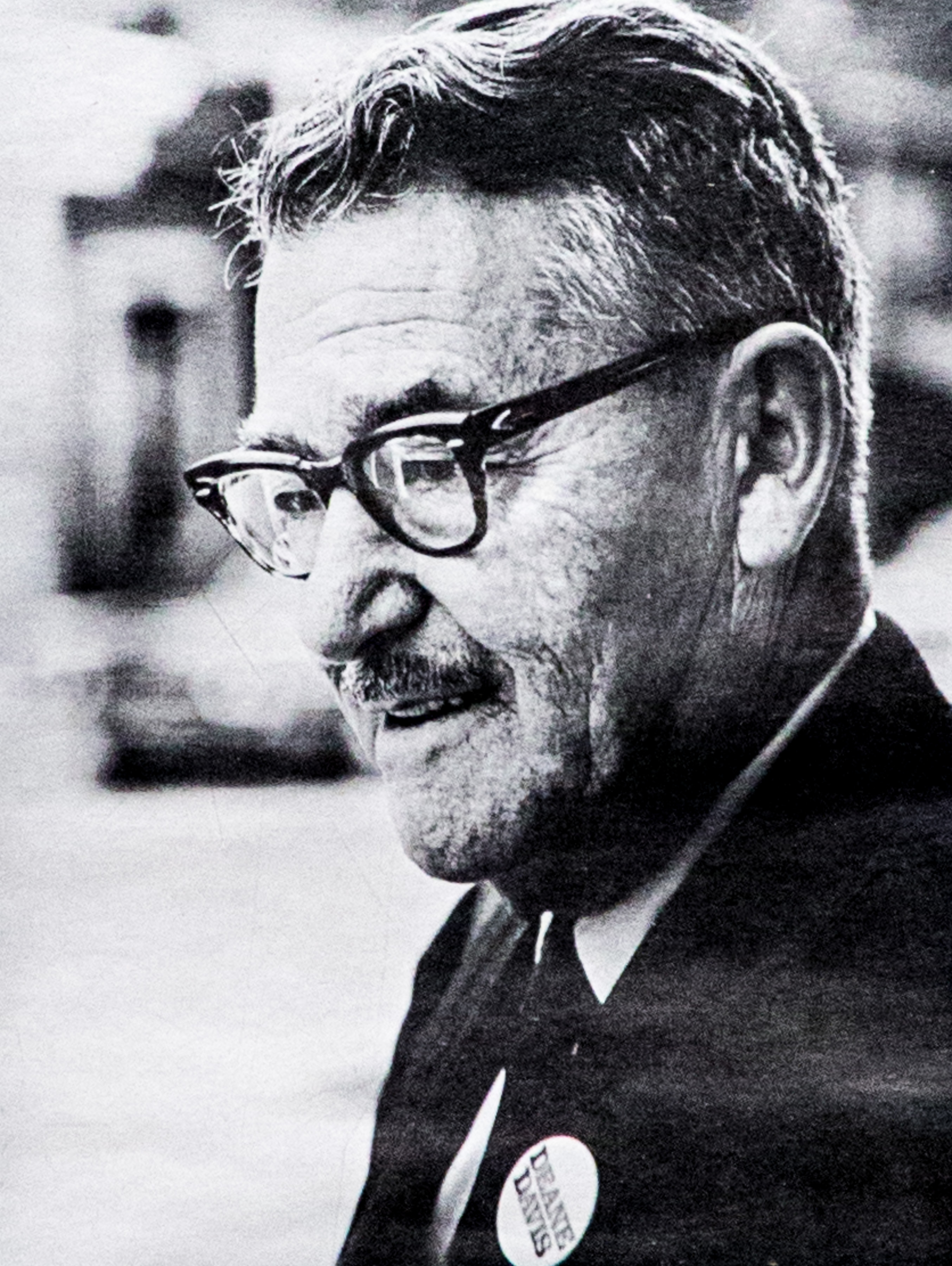

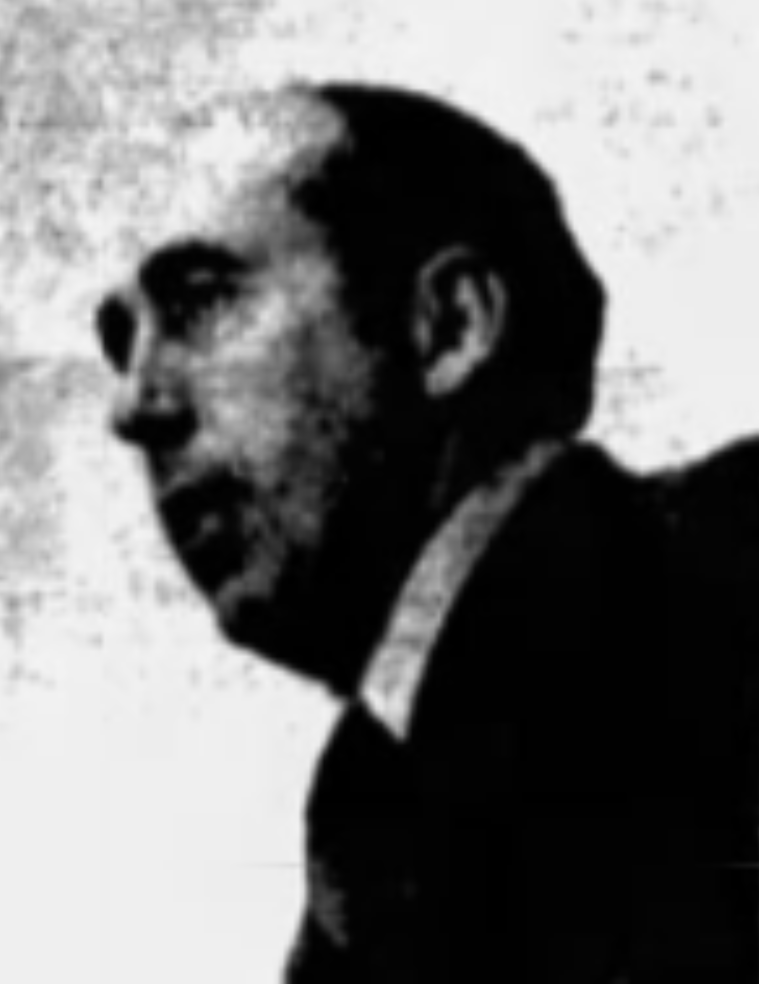
Nominee	Deane C. Davis	Leo O'Brien Jr.
Party	Republican	Democratic
Popular vote	87,458	66,028
Percentage	56.96%	43.01%
- Davis: 50–60% 60–70% 70–80% 80–90% >90% O'Brien: 50–60% 60–70% 70–80% Tie: 50%
Governor before election
Deane C. Davis
Republican
Elected Governor
Deane C. Davis
Republican

The 1970 Vermont gubernatorial election took place on November 3, 1970. Incumbent Republican Deane C. Davis ran successfully for re-election to a second term as Governor of Vermont, defeating Democratic candidate Leo O'Brien Jr.

== Republican primary ==
=== Results ===
Republican primary results
Party	Candidate	Votes	%	±%
Republican	Deane C. Davis (inc.)	31,549	79.3	
Republican	Thomas L. Hayes	8,048	20.2	
Republican	Other	175	0.4	
Total votes		39,772	100.0	

== Democratic primary ==
=== Results ===
Democratic primary results
Party	Candidate	Votes	%	±%
Democratic	Leo O'Brien Jr.	18,058	54.7	
Democratic	John J. Daley	14,795	44.8	
Democratic	Other	147	0.4	
Total votes		33,000	100.0	

== General election ==
=== Results ===
1970 Vermont gubernatorial election
Party	Candidate	Votes	%	±%
Republican	Deane C. Davis (inc.)	87,458	56.96	
Democratic	Leo O'Brien, Jr.	66,028	43.01	
N/A	Other	42	0.03	
Total votes		153,528	100.0	
