= Leroy Lawrence =

American farmer, businessman, and politician

Speaker of the Vermont House of Representatives
- In office 1961–1963
- Preceded by: F. Ray Keyser Jr.
- Succeeded by: Franklin S. Billings Jr.

Member of the Vermont House of Representatives
- In office 1957–1965
- In office 1935–1937

Personal details
- Born: June 22, 1908 Arlington, Vermont, U.S.
- Died: November 17, 1997 (aged 89) Bennington, Vermont, U.S.
- Party: Republican
- Education: Clarkson University
- Occupation: Politician, farmer, businessman

Leroy Lawrence (June 22, 1908 – November 17, 1997) was a Vermont farmer, businessman and politician who served as Speaker of the Vermont House of Representatives.

== Biography ==
Leroy Eugene Lawrence was born in Arlington, Vermont, on June 22, 1908 and was raised in Sunderland. He attended Clarkson University and became a farmer.

A Republican, in 1934 Lawrence was elected to the Vermont House of Representatives and served one term, 1935 to 1937.

Lawrence later moved to Stamford, where he continued to farm. He served as President of the Bennington County Farm Bureau, and also held local offices including Town Meeting Moderator and Selectman.

In 1956 Lawrence was again elected to the Vermont House, serving four terms, 1957 to 1965. He was Speaker of the House in his third term, 1961 to 1963.

After leaving the legislature Lawrence converted his Stamford farm, developing homes and turning part of the property into a golf course, the Stamford Valley Golf Club.

Lawrence died in Bennington on November 17, 1997. He was cremated.

Political offices
Preceded by F. Ray Keyser, Jr.	Speaker of the Vermont House of Representatives; 1961–1963	Succeeded by Franklin S. Billings, Jr.
