= F. Ray Keyser Jr. =

American lawyer and politician (1927–2015)

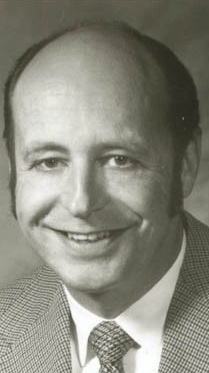

72nd Governor of Vermont
- In office January 5, 1961 – January 10, 1963
- Lieutenant: Ralph Foote
- Preceded by: Robert Stafford
- Succeeded by: Philip Hoff

Speaker of the Vermont House of Representatives
- In office 1959–1961
- Preceded by: Charles H. Brown
- Succeeded by: Leroy Lawrence

Member of the Vermont House of Representatives from Chelsea
- In office 1955–1961
- Preceded by: Berthold C. Coburn
- Succeeded by: Walter L. Kennedy

Personal details
- Born: Frank Ray Keyser Jr. August 17, 1927 Chelsea, Vermont, U.S.
- Died: March 7, 2015 (aged 87) Brandon, Vermont, U.S.
- Resting place: Highland Cemetery, Chelsea, Vermont
- Party: Republican
- Spouses: Joan Friedgen (m. 1950; died 2002) Mary-Louise Keyser (m. 2005)
- Children: 3
- Relatives: F. Ray Keyser Sr. (father)
- Education: Tufts University; Boston University
- Profession: Attorney

Frank Ray Keyser Jr. (August 17, 1927 – March 7, 2015) was an American lawyer and politician from Vermont. He served as Speaker of the Vermont House of Representatives from 1959 to 1961, and the 72nd governor of Vermont from 1961 to 1963.

== Biography ==
=== Early life ===
The son of Vermont Supreme Court Justice F. Ray Keyser Sr. and Ellen Larkin Keyser, the younger Keyser was born in Chelsea, Vermont, on August 17, 1927. He served as a page in the Vermont House of Representatives in 1939. In 1945 he graduated from Montpelier High School. He served in the United States Navy during World War II.

In 1950 Keyser graduated from Tufts University with a Bachelor of Arts degree, and was a member of the Delta Upsilon fraternity. He graduated from Boston University School of Law in 1952 and practiced law in Chelsea.

Keyser married his first wife, the former Joan F. Friedgen, an engineer and statistician, on July 15, 1950. The couple has three children – Carol E. Fjeld, Christopher S. Keyser, and Frank Ray Keyser III. Joan Keyser served as the First Lady of Vermont during her husband's tenure as governor.

=== Career ===
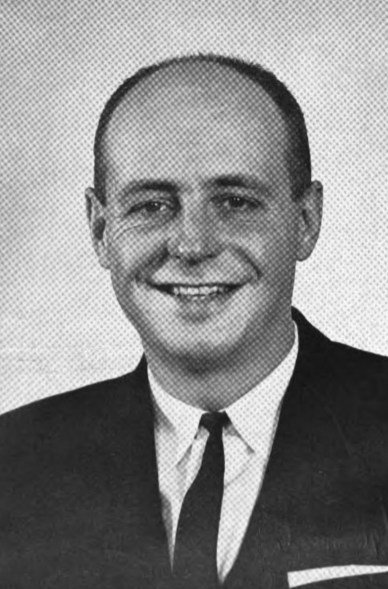
Keyser as governor.

A Republican, Keyser served three terms in the Vermont House of Representatives (1955–1961), and was Speaker from 1959 to 1961.

In 1960 Keyser defeated the Lieutenant Governor, Robert S. Babcock in the Republican primary for governor. He won the general election, and he served one term, 1961 to 1963. At age 33, Keyser was the youngest person to be elected Vermont's governor. During his term he initiated the Vermont Industrial Building Authority as a way to stimulate economic growth and job creation, and also oversaw expansion of the state park system.

In 1961 Keyser was awarded the honorary degree of LL.D. by Tufts University. Also in 1961, Keyser appeared as a contestant on an episode of To Tell the Truth; five years after an appearance by West Virginia Governor Cecil Underwood, Underwood appeared again; Keyser was one of the two impostors who claimed to be Underwood.

In 1962 Keyser lost his race for reelection to Democrat Philip H. Hoff. Hoff's victory marked the first time Republicans had lost the governorship since the founding of the Republican Party in the 1850s and as of 2021 is the last time an incumbent governor of Vermont has been defeated for re-election.

From 1965 to 1970, Keyser was vice president and general counsel for the Vermont Marble Company, and he was chief executive officer and chairman of the board from 1970 to 1979.

From 1967 to 1972, he was on the board of the Federal Reserve Bank of Boston and he was a director of the Central Vermont Public Service Corporation and chairman of the board from 1980 to 1997.

In 1980 he organized the Rutland law office of Keyser and Crowley. Keyser also served as a director of the Union Mutual of Vermont insurance company.

Keyser's first wife, former Vermont First Lady Joan Keyser, died in 2002; the couple had three children. He married Mary Lou (Underhill) Keyser in 2005.

A longtime resident of Proctor, Keyser died at his daughter Carol Fjeld's home in Brandon on March 7, 2015, at the age of 87. He was buried at Highland Cemetery in Chelsea.

== Sources ==
- Vermont Folk Life Center, Biography, F. Ray Keyser Jr.

Political offices
Preceded by Charles Brown	Speaker of the Vermont House of Representatives; 1959–1961	Succeeded by Leroy Lawrence
Preceded by Robert Stafford	Governor of Vermont; 1961–1963	Succeeded by Philip Hoff
Party political offices
Preceded by Robert Stafford	Republican nominee for Governor of Vermont; 1960, 1962	Succeeded by Ralph Foote
