= Ralph A. Foote =

American attorney and politician (1923–2003)

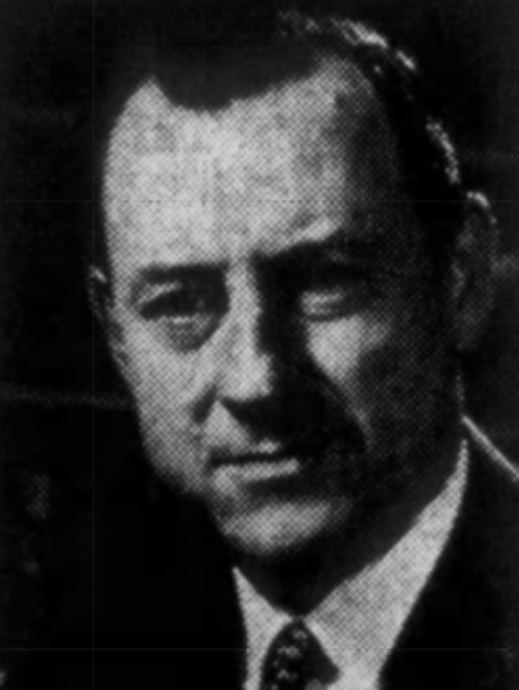
- Foote in 1964

69th Lieutenant Governor of Vermont
- In office January 5, 1961 – January 6, 1965
- Governor: F. Ray Keyser, Jr. Philip H. Hoff
- Preceded by: Robert S. Babcock
- Succeeded by: John J. Daley

Member of the Vermont House of Representatives from Middlebury
- In office January 9, 1957 – January 4, 1961
- Preceded by: Chester A. Ingalls
- Succeeded by: Stanton S. Lazarus

State's Attorney of Addison County, Vermont
- In office January 23, 1950 – August 9, 1950
- Preceded by: John A. Calhoun
- Succeeded by: William S. Burrage

Personal details
- Born: January 22, 1923 Proctor, Vermont, U.S.
- Died: July 16, 2003 (aged 80) Middlebury, Vermont, U.S.
- Resting place: Evergreen Cemetery, West Cornwall, Vermont
- Party: Republican
- Spouse: Nancy Dickey Foote
- Children: 5
- Education: Amherst College; Albany Law School
- Profession: Attorney

Military service
- Allegiance: United States
- Branch/service: Marine Corps; Marine Corps Reserve
- Years of service: 1943–1946 (Marine Corps); 1946–1950 (Reserve); 1950–1952 (Marine Corps); 1952– 1963 (Reserve)
- Rank: Captain
- Battles/wars: World War II; Korean War

Ralph Albert Foote (January 22, 1923 – July 16, 2003) was an American attorney who served as the 69th lieutenant governor of Vermont from 1961 to 1965, and a prominent attorney practicing in Middlebury, Vermont.

== Early life ==
Foote was born in Proctor, Vermont, on January 22, 1923. He was the grandson of Lieutenant Governor Abram W. Foote.

Foote graduated from Amherst College in 1943 and served in the United States Marine Corps during World War II, including combat at the Battle of Okinawa. He graduated from Albany Law School in 1949 and became an attorney in Middlebury. He returned to active duty with the Marines during the Korean War.

== Career ==
A Republican, Foote served as Deputy State's Attorney of Addison County and interim state's attorney. He was an unsuccessful candidate for the Republican state's attorney nomination in 1950. Foote ran successfully for the Vermont House of Representatives in 1956 and served two terms, also serving as chairman of the House Judiciary Committee.

Elected Lieutenant Governor in 1960, he served under Republican F. Ray Keyser Jr. When Keyser lost the governorship to Philip H. Hoff in 1962, Foote won re-election. In 1964 Foote challenged Hoff, but lost badly in what turned into a wave election for Democrats nationwide.

Foote spent the rest of his career at the law firm of Conley and Foote in Middlebury. He also served as president of the Addison County and Vermont Bar Associations, was chairman of the Vermont Judicial Conduct Board, and chaired the Middlebury and Addison County Republican Committees.

== Personal life ==
He was married for more than 50 years to Nancy Dickey Foote. They had five sons—Brian, Peter, Cory, Richard, and Anthony.

== Death ==
He died in Middlebury on July 16, 2003. He was cremated, and his remains were interred at Evergreen Cemetery in West Cornwall, Vermont. His wife Nancy died on May 10, 2014.

Party political offices
| Preceded by Robert S. Babcock | Republican nominee for Lieutenant Governor of Vermont; 1960, 1962 | Succeeded by Richard A. Snelling |
| Preceded by F. Ray Keyser Jr. | Republican nominee for Governor of Vermont; 1964 | Succeeded by Richard A. Snelling |
Political offices
| Preceded by Robert S. Babcock | Lieutenant Governor of Vermont; 1961–1965 | Succeeded by John J. Daley |
