= Deane C. Davis =

American politician

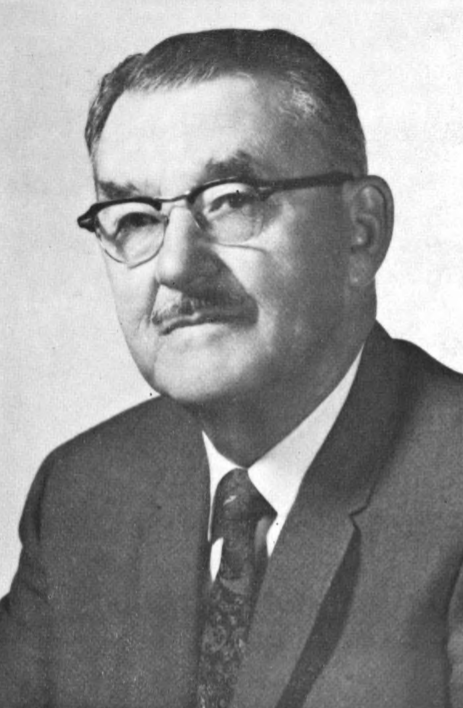
- Davis as Governor

74th Governor of Vermont
- In office January 9, 1969 – January 4, 1973
- Lieutenant: Thomas L. Hayes; John S. Burgess
- Preceded by: Philip H. Hoff
- Succeeded by: Thomas P. Salmon

President of the Vermont Bar Association
- In office October 7, 1942 – October 6, 1943
- Preceded by: Joseph A. McNamara
- Succeeded by: Frank E. Barber

President of the Vermont Chamber of Commerce
- In office June 11, 1942 – August 6, 1943
- Preceded by: Albert A. Cree
- Succeeded by: Harold P. Parker

Judge of the Vermont Superior Court
- In office October 9, 1931 – January 21, 1936
- Preceded by: Warner A. Graham
- Succeeded by: Charles A. Shields

State's Attorney of Washington County, Vermont
- In office February 1, 1927 – March 7, 1928
- Preceded by: Charles Bayley Adams
- Succeeded by: Edwin L. Scott

Personal details
- Born: Deane Chandler Davis; November 7, 1900 East Barre, Vermont, U.S.
- Died: December 8, 1990 (aged 90) Berlin, Vermont, U.S.
- Party: Republican
- Spouses: Corinne Eastman (m. 1924; died 1951) Marjorie Smith Conzelman (m. 1952)
- Children: 3
- Education: Boston University (LL.B.)
- Profession: Lawyer

Deane Chandler Davis (November 7, 1900 – December 8, 1990) was an American attorney and insurance executive from Vermont. Long active in Republican politics, he was the 74th governor of Vermont from 1969 to 1973.

== Early life ==
Deane Davis was born in East Barre, Vermont, on November 7, 1900, the son of Earle Russell Davis and Lois Salome Hillery. Earle Davis was an attorney who was state's attorney for Washington County and county probate judge.

The younger Davis attended the schools of Barre, and graduated from Spaulding High School in 1918. As Davis related in a 1978 interview, he intended to begin college after high school, but became ill during that year's influenza pandemic and did not recover until September. In searching for a university in which he could enroll after recovering, Davis sought one that had a World War I-era Student Army Training Corps program that would enable him to pay for his expenses. He discovered that the only place on the east coast that met this requirement was Boston University School of Law, which required two years of liberal arts education. The dean of the law school agreed to enroll Davis provided that he simultaneously complete the liberal arts requirements. He studied at the law school while participating in the SATC program, received his Bachelor of Laws degree in 1922, and became a lawyer in Barre.

== Career ==
A Republican, Davis worked in local offices including member of the city council and city attorney. From 1927 to 1928 he was Washington County State's Attorney. From 1931 to 1936 Davis was a judge of the Vermont Superior Court, having been appointed to fill the vacancy created when Warner A. Graham was appointed to the Vermont Supreme Court. As a leader of the party, Davis also attended numerous state and national conventions as a delegate, including the 1948 Republican National Convention.

In the 1930s Davis practiced law in partnership with Stanley C. Wilson, F. Ray Keyser Sr., and J. Ward Carver. Their firm was described as Vermont's "best ever collection of legal talent," in that it included one future Vermont Supreme Court justice (Keyser), one past and one future governor (Wilson and Davis), and one past Vermont Attorney General (Carver).

In 1940 Davis left private practice to become general counsel for the National Life Insurance Company. From 1942 to 1943 he was president of the Vermont Chamber of Commerce. In October 1942 he became president of the Vermont Bar Association, succeeding Joseph A. McNamara, and had a one-year term. In 1943 he was appointed a vice president of National Life. He was named president in 1950, and was chief executive officer from 1960 to 1966. From 1966 to 1968 Davis was National Life's chairman of the board.

== Governor of Vermont ==
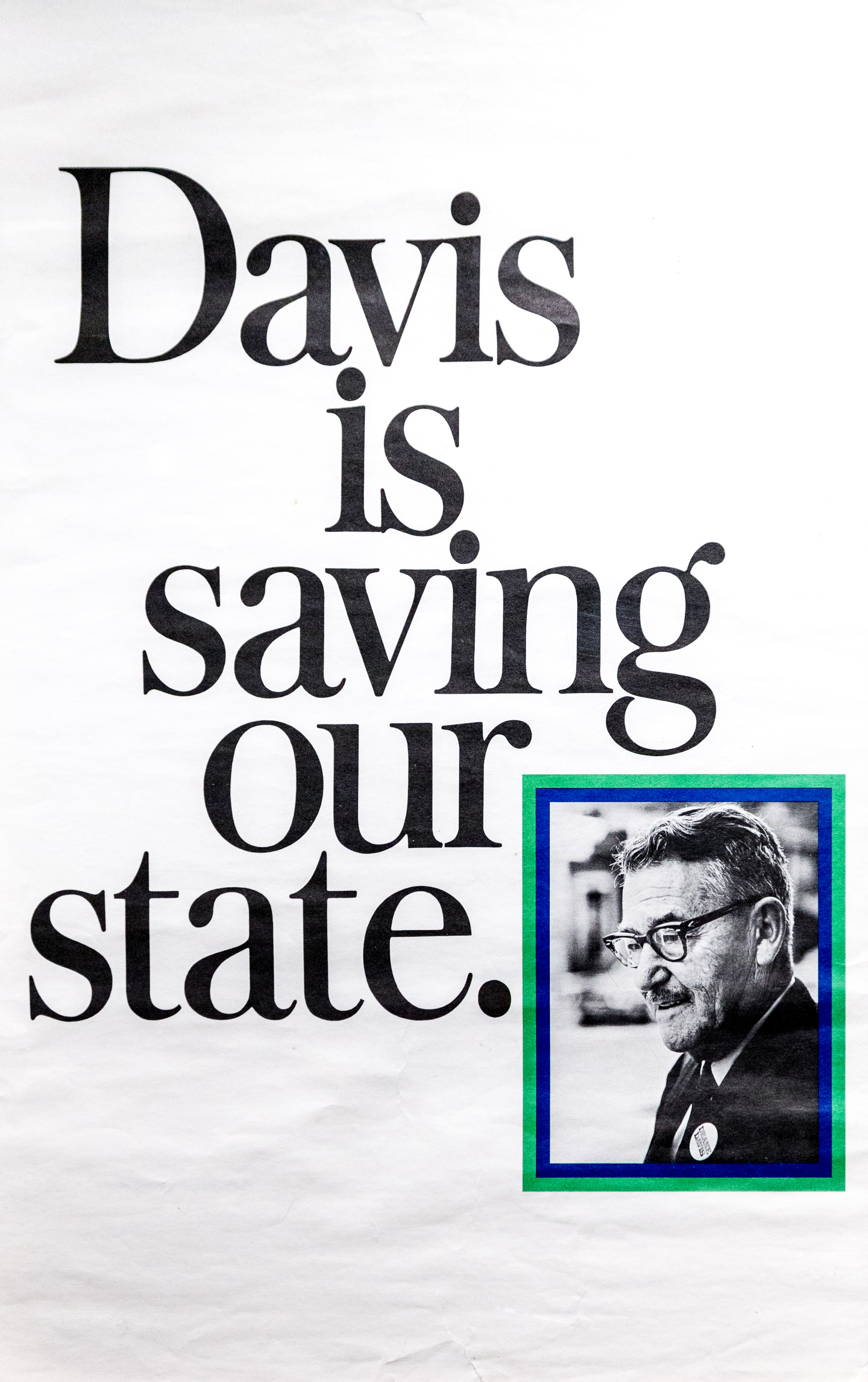
Davis re-election poster, 1970.

From 1957 to 1959, Davis was chairman of a state commission that reviewed the organization and functions of the state government (a "little Hoover Commission") and proposed modernization and reforms in a report to the Vermont General Assembly. In 1968, Davis decided to continue that work by running for governor. His candidacy was out of the ordinary because he ran at a relatively advanced age, and because he had not served the usual "apprenticeship" of previous successful Republican nominees for governor. Prior to Davis, the Republican Party, which had controlled statewide offices for more than 100 years, had almost always prepared candidates for governor by electing them to leadership positions in the Vermont House of Representatives or Vermont Senate, or lesser state offices such as lieutenant governor. Davis defeated Attorney General James L. Oakes in the Republican primary. In the general election, Davis prevailed over Lieutenant Governor John J. Daley.

Davis ran for reelection in 1970 and defeated Lieutenant Governor Thomas L. Hayes in the Republican primary. In the general election, Davis prevailed over Democrat Leo O'Brien Jr., who was a member of the Vermont Senate. Davis served as governor from 1969 to 1973. His governorship was particularly noteworthy for the creation of a state sales tax to help balance the state budget. Davis also oversaw the 1970 enactment of Act 250, a law designed to allow for planned real estate sale and development while also safeguarding the environment, community life, and aesthetic character of the state.

Official Vermont State House portrait.

== Career as author ==
In his retirement he authored three books, including 1980's Justice in the Mountains, 1982's Nothin' but the Truth, and 1991's Deane C. Davis: An Autobiography.

== Death and burial ==
Davis died in Berlin on December 8, 1990. He was interred in Barre's Elmwood Cemetery.

== Family ==
In 1924, Davis married Corrine Eastman (1901–1951). They were the parents of three children— Deane (1925–1929), Marian (1927–2014), and Thomas (1931–2017). In 1952, Davis married Marjorie Phyllis Smith Conzelman (1904–2003).

== Legacy ==
In 1957, Davis received an honorary doctorate from the University of Vermont.

The Deane C. Davis Outstanding Business Award annually honors a Vermont enterprise that shows an outstanding history of sustained growth while displaying an acute awareness of what makes Vermont unique. The award is sponsored by Vermont Business Magazine and the Vermont Chamber of Commerce.

Davis was a noted horseman and proponent of the Morgan horse breed, including service as President of the Morgan Horse Club, Inc. The Vermont Morgan Horse Association created the Deane C. Davis Memorial Award in his honor. The Davis Award is presented annually to a person who has a history of promoting the Morgan Horse, but may have made their contribution quietly and steadily over a long period of time.

A collection of Davis papers is part of the University of Vermont's special collections. Another, the Deane C. Davis Papers are part of the Vermont Historical Society's Barre History Collection.

== Works ==
- Justice in the Mountains: Stories and Tales by a Vermont Country Lawyer. New England Press. 1980. ISBN 0-933050-05-4.
- Nothing but the Truth. New England Press. 1982. ISBN 0-933050-14-3.
- Deane C. Davis: An Autobiography. New England Press. 1990. ISBN 0-933050-91-7.

== Sources ==
- The Vermont Encyclopedia, edited by John J. Duffy, Samuel B. Hand and Ralph H. Orth, 2003, page 102

Party political offices
| Preceded by Richard A. Snelling | Republican nominee for Governor of Vermont; 1968, 1970 | Succeeded by Luther F. Hackett |
Political offices
| Preceded by Philip H. Hoff | Governor of Vermont; 1969–1973 | Succeeded by Thomas P. Salmon |
