= List of mayors of Rutland, Vermont =

This is a list of people who have served as Mayor of the US city of Rutland, Vermont, since its incorporation as a city on November 19, 1892.

Mayor	Term	Notes
John A. Mead	1893	
Levi G. Kingsley	1894	
John A. Sheldon	1895	
Thomas H. Browne	1896	
Percival W. Clement	1897-1898	
William Y. W. Ripley	1899	
John D. Spellman	1900	
J. Burton Hollister	1901	
David W. Temple	1902-1903	
Jack S. Carder	1904	
J. Forest Manning	1905	
Charles E. Paige	1906	
Rollin R. Richmond	1907	
Henry O. Carpenter	1908-1910	
Percival W. Clement	1911-1912	
Charles L. Howe	1912	Judge Charles Luther Howe succeeded Clement when Clement resigned to serve as Chairman of New England Railroad Conference Commission and a member of the Vermont Educational Commission.
Henry C. Brislin	1913-1914	
Bert L. Stafford	1915-1916	
Henry C. Brislin	1917-1918	
James C. Dunn	1919-1926	
Arthur W. Perkins	1927-1934	
Henry H. Branchaud	1935-1938	
Henry B. Carpenter	1939-1942	
Wayne N. Temple	1943-1949	
Dan J. Healy	1949-1957	
Francis F. Waterman	1957-1959	
Dan J. Healy	1959-1961	
John J. Daley	1961-1965	
Harold J. Nichols	1965-1971	
William H. Foley, Sr.	1971-1973	
Gilbert G. Godnick	1973-1981	
John J. Daley	1981-1987	
Jeffery N. Wennberg	1987-1999	
John P. Cassarino	1999-2007	
Christopher C. Louras	2007-2017	Bid for 6th term defeated by City Councilor David Allaire, March 2017
David Allaire	2017-2023	
Michael Doenges	2023–2026	Resigned in 2026.
Tom Donahue	2026-Present	
