= Bert L. Stafford =

American attorney and politician (1877–1941)

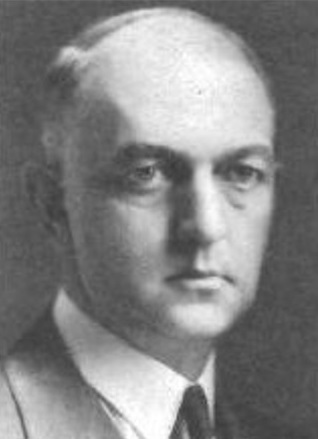
- Rutland Herald, May 15, 1936

President of the Vermont Bar Association
- In office January 9, 1930 – October 8, 1930
- Preceded by: Homer L. Skeels
- Succeeded by: George L. Hunt

Mayor of Rutland, Vermont
- In office March 4, 1915 – March 7, 1917
- Preceded by: Henry C. Brislin
- Succeeded by: Henry C. Brislin

State's Attorney of Rutland County, Vermont
- In office December 1, 1910 – January 31, 1915
- Preceded by: Joseph C. Jones
- Succeeded by: Camille V. Poulin

Member of the Vermont House of Representatives from Tinmouth
- In office October 4, 1906 – October 7, 1908
- Preceded by: Henry H. Ballard
- Succeeded by: Aaron L. Pitts

Personal details
- Born: December 14, 1877 Tinmouth, Vermont
- Died: December 14, 1941 (aged 64) Rutland, Vermont
- Resting place: Evergreen Cemetery, Rutland, Vermont
- Party: Republican
- Spouse: Mabel Rose Stratton (m. 1911–1941, his death)
- Children: 3 (including Robert Stafford)
- Education: Middlebury College
- Profession: Attorney

Bert Linus Stafford (December 14, 1877 – July 29, 1941) was an American attorney and politician from Vermont. A Republican, he was most notable for his service in the Vermont House of Representatives from 1906 to 1908, as State's Attorney of Rutland County from 1910 to 1915, and as mayor of Rutland from 1915 to 1917. He was the father of Vermont governor and U.S. Senator Robert Stafford.

== Early life ==
Bert L. Stafford was born in Tinmouth, Vermont on December 14, 1877, the son of Daniel Bartlett and Mary M. (Valentine) Stafford. He attended the schools of Tinmouth, Wallingford High School, and the Rutland Institute. He then began attendance at Middlebury College, from which he graduated in 1901 with a Bachelor of Arts degree. Stafford was the president of his senior class and a member of the Delta Upsilon fraternity.

== Start of career ==
After his graduation, Stafford joined the teaching service organized by the United States Office of Education to provide instruction to students in the Philippines following the Philippine–American War. Stafford taught students in Manila from 1901 to 1904, when he returned to Vermont to recuperate after contracting malaria. Upon returning to Vermont, Stafford studied law at the Rutland office of Lawrence and Lawrence. He was admitted to the bar in October 1906, and became a partner in the firm of Lawrence, Lawrence and Stafford. The firm was later reorganized with Asa S. Bloomer as a partner, and operated as Lawrence, Stafford and Bloomer.

== Continued career ==
A Republican, Stafford represented Tinmouth in the Vermont House of Representatives from 1906 to 1908. From 1910 to 1915, he served as State's Attorney of Rutland County. He later moved to Rutland, and he served as mayor from 1915 to 1917. During World War I, Stafford served on the draft board for the district which included Rutland.

Stafford was involved in several Rutland-area businesses, including serving as president and a director of the Rutland County National Bank, trustee of the Marble Savings Bank, and director of the Cahee House Furnishing Company. Stafford was a Freemason and member of the Rutland Rotary Club. In addition, he was a member and president of both the county and state bar associations. He served on the state board of education for nearly twenty years, and was its chairman for six.

=== Embezzlement case ===
In December 1936, Stafford, Governor Charles Manley Smith, president of the Marble Savings Bank, and other bank officials were charged with fraud for failing to inform account holders and authorities about an embezzlement. In May, 1932 Smith had learned that the bank's bookkeeper, John J. Cocklin, had stolen $251,000 (about $5.2 million in 2022). Smith let him leave quietly, kept the theft secret, and charged the loss against the bank's surplus. In July, 1935 Cocklin was named Rutland's assistant city treasurer and planned a candidacy for treasurer. To prevent this, his opponents leaked word of his theft to the press. Cocklin was convicted and jailed, and the bank's treasurer received a sentence of six months imprisonment, which was suspended, and a $400 fine. Smith was acquitted at his trial, while charges against Stafford and the other parties were dismissed.

== Death and burial ==
Stafford began to experience declining health in the 1930s, and suffered three heart attacks. His health improved each time to the point where he was able to resume working. He died of a cerebral hemorrhage in Rutland on July 29, 1941. Stafford was buried at Evergreen Cemetery in Rutland.

== Family ==
In November 1911, Stafford married Mabel Rose Stratton of Linesville, Pennsylvania (1883-1976). They were the parents of three children: Robert Theodore (1913–2006), Thomas Bartlett (1916–1990), and Shirley Ruth (1917–2003).

Robert Theodore Stafford was an attorney and politician who served as governor of Vermont and a U.S. Senator. Thomas Stafford was businessman who served as executive vice president of the Vermont Marble Company and was a member of the Vermont House of Representatives. Shirley Ruth Stafford was a Rutland-area real estate broker.
