= Chelsea, Vermont =

- Town
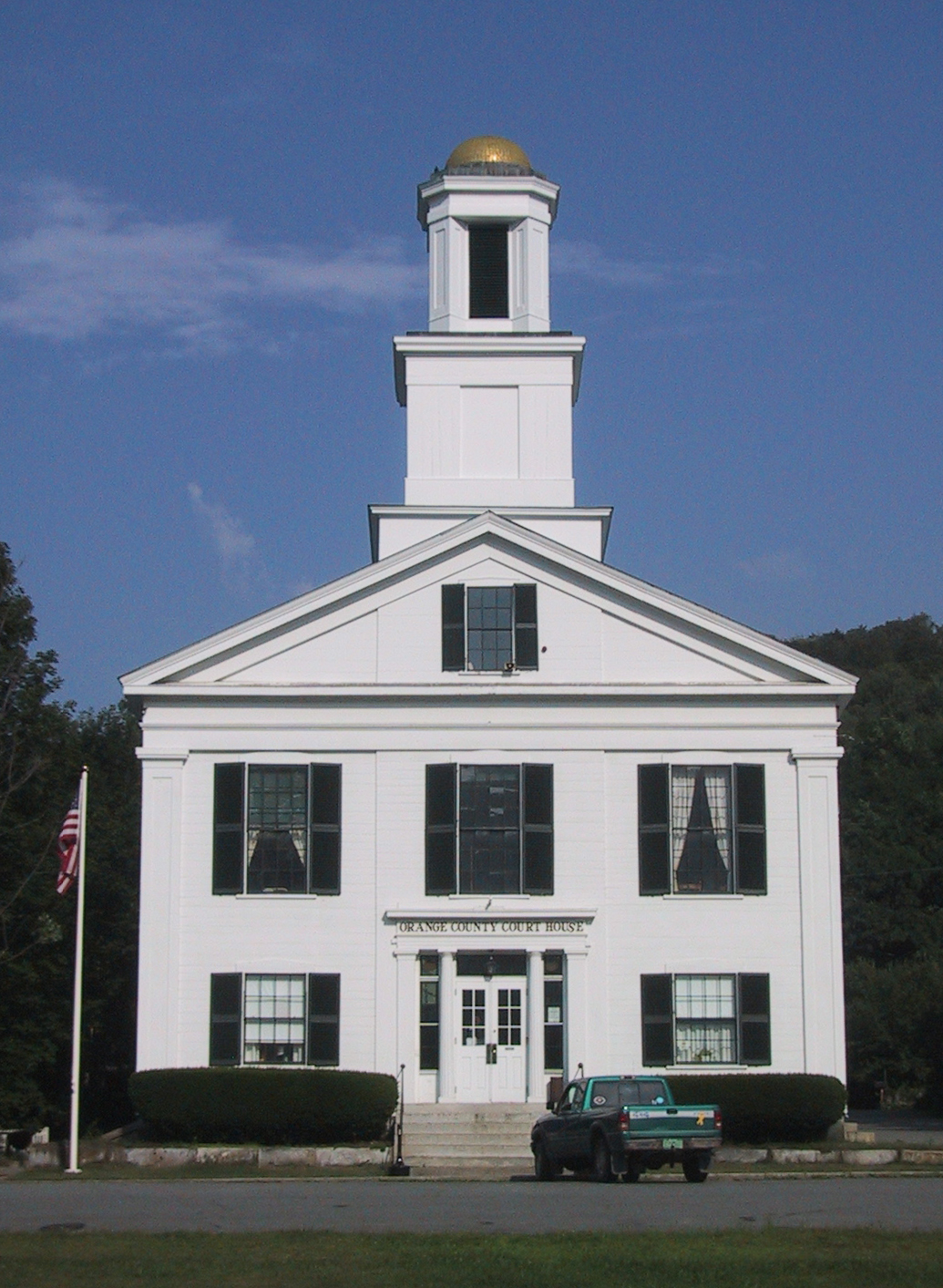
- Orange County Court House in Chelsea, Vermont

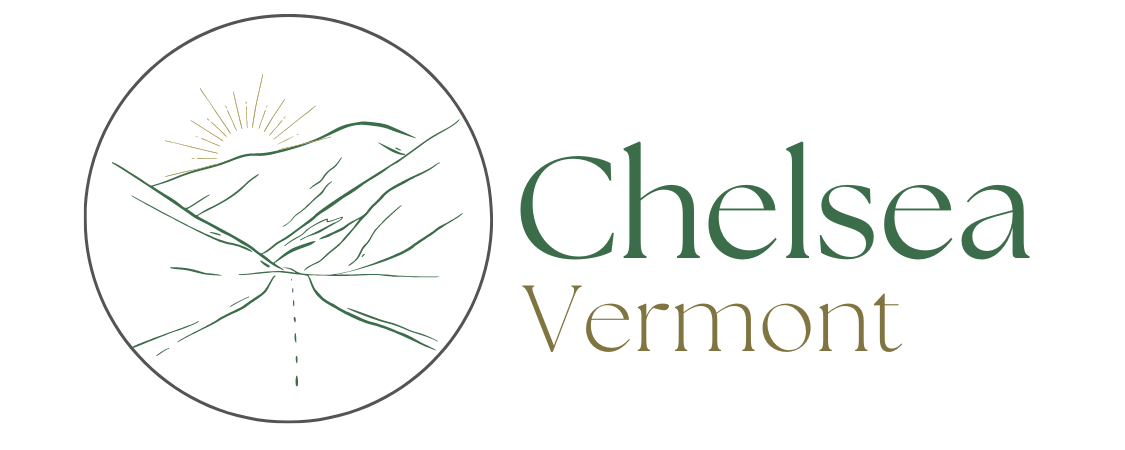
- Logo

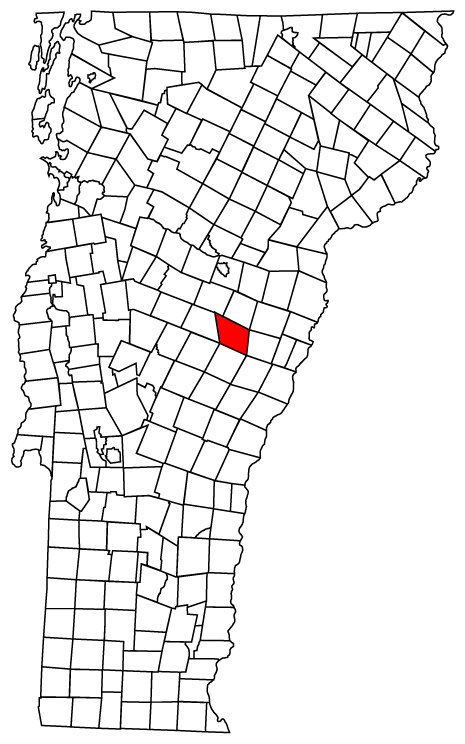
- Located in Orange County, Vermont
- Coordinates: 44°00′02″N 72°28′46″W
- Country: United States
- State: Vermont
- County: Orange
- Chartered: 1781 (Vermont)
- Communities: Chelsea; Chelsea West Hill

Area
  - Total: 39.9 sq mi (103.4 km^{2})
  - Land: 39.9 sq mi (103.4 km^{2})
  - Water: 0.039 sq mi (0.1 km^{2})
- Elevation: 1,181 ft (360 m)

Population (2020)
  - Total: 1,233
  - Density: 31/sq mi (11.9/km^{2})
  - Households: 495
  - Families: 324
- Time zone: UTC-5 (EST)
  - Summer (DST): UTC-4 (EDT)
- ZIP code: 05038
- Area code: 802
- FIPS code: 50-13525
- GNIS feature ID: 1462069
- Website: www.chelseavt.org

Chelsea is the shire town of Orange County, Vermont, United States. The town's population was 1,233 at the 2020 census.

== Geography ==
Chelsea is located in a river valley in central Vermont. The First Branch of the White River travels through the valley and the town. Located in the center of town, in the village of Chelsea, are two commons.

According to the United States Census Bureau, the town has a total area of 40.1 square miles (103.4 km^{2}), of which 40.06 square miles (103.4 km^{2}) is land and 0.04 square mile (0.1 km^{2}) (0.05%) is water.

=== Climate ===
Climate data for Chelsea 2 NW, Vermont, 1991–2020 normals: 1440ft (439m)
Month	Jan	Feb	Mar	Apr	May	Jun	Jul	Aug	Sep	Oct	Nov	Dec	Year
Mean daily maximum °F (°C)	24.8 (−4.0)	28.0 (−2.2)	36.3 (2.4)	49.8 (9.9)	63.3 (17.4)	71.8 (22.1)	76.2 (24.6)	75.3 (24.1)	67.8 (19.9)	54.5 (12.5)	41.8 (5.4)	30.8 (−0.7)	51.7 (11.0)
Daily mean °F (°C)	16.0 (−8.9)	18.3 (−7.6)	26.8 (−2.9)	39.8 (4.3)	52.4 (11.3)	61.3 (16.3)	65.7 (18.7)	64.3 (17.9)	56.9 (13.8)	44.9 (7.2)	33.8 (1.0)	22.7 (−5.2)	41.9 (5.5)
Mean daily minimum °F (°C)	7.2 (−13.8)	8.6 (−13.0)	17.2 (−8.2)	29.8 (−1.2)	41.5 (5.3)	50.7 (10.4)	55.2 (12.9)	53.3 (11.8)	46.0 (7.8)	35.3 (1.8)	25.7 (−3.5)	14.7 (−9.6)	32.1 (0.1)
Average precipitation inches (mm)	2.55 (65)	2.21 (56)	2.78 (71)	3.24 (82)	3.65 (93)	4.68 (119)	4.59 (117)	4.25 (108)	3.66 (93)	4.42 (112)	3.10 (79)	3.31 (84)	42.44 (1,079)
Average snowfall inches (cm)	17.10 (43.4)	21.50 (54.6)	17.10 (43.4)	5.10 (13.0)	0.30 (0.76)	0.00 (0.00)	0.00 (0.00)	0.00 (0.00)	0.00 (0.00)	1.10 (2.8)	4.00 (10.2)	22.60 (57.4)	88.8 (225.56)
Source: NOAA

== Demographics ==
Historical population
Census	Pop.	Note	%±
1790	239		—
1800	897		275.3%
1810	1,327		47.9%
1820	1,462		10.2%
1830	1,958		33.9%
1840	1,959		0.1%
1850	1,958		−0.1%
1860	1,757		−10.3%
1870	1,526		−13.1%
1880	1,462		−4.2%
1890	1,230		−15.9%
1900	1,070		−13.0%
1910	1,074		0.4%
1920	1,087		1.2%
1930	1,004		−7.6%
1940	1,013		0.9%
1950	1,025		1.2%
1960	957		−6.6%
1970	983		2.7%
1980	1,091		11.0%
1990	1,166		6.9%
2000	1,250		7.2%
2010	1,238		−1.0%
2020	1,233		−0.4%
U.S. Decennial Census

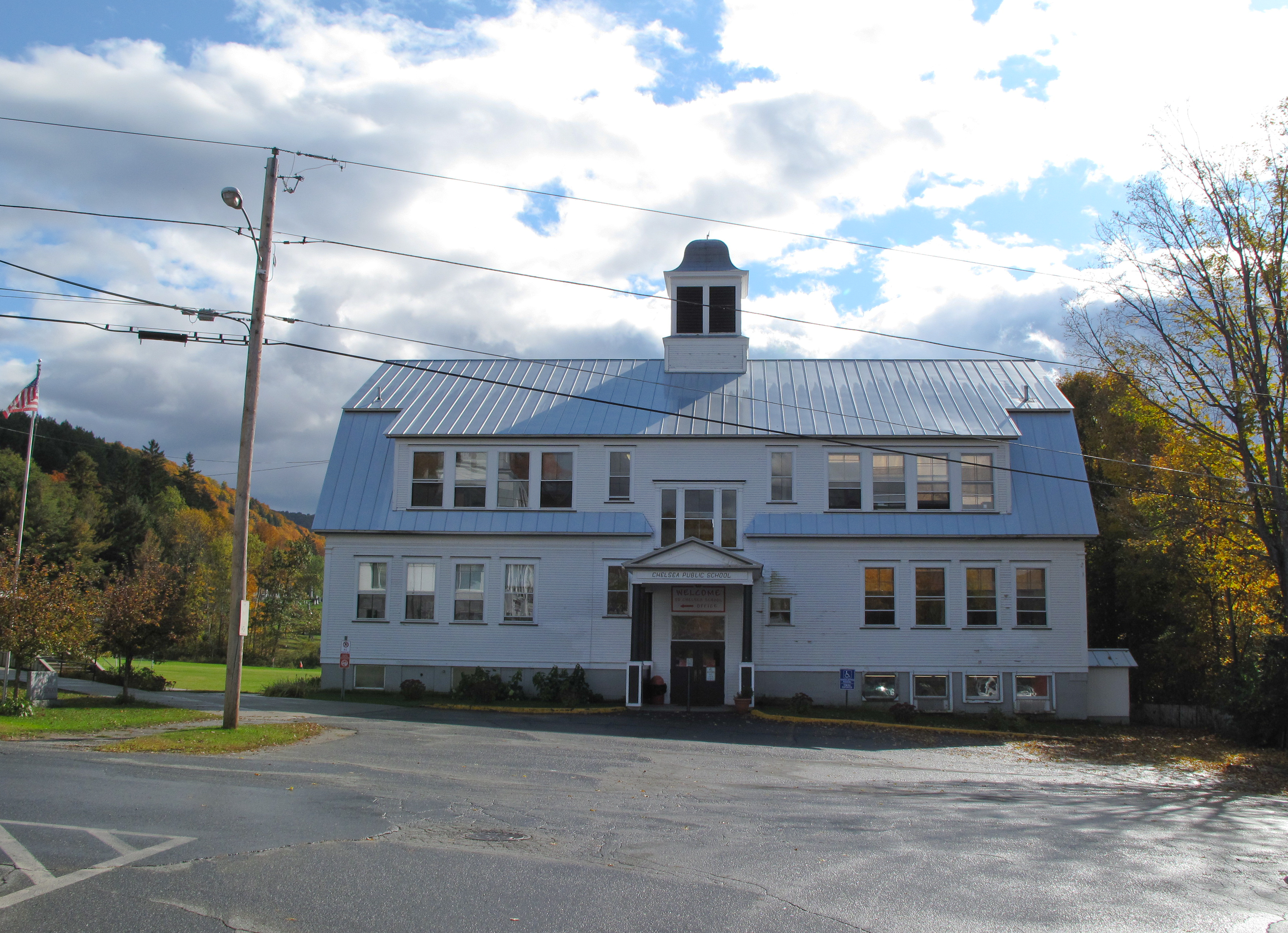
Chelsea Public School

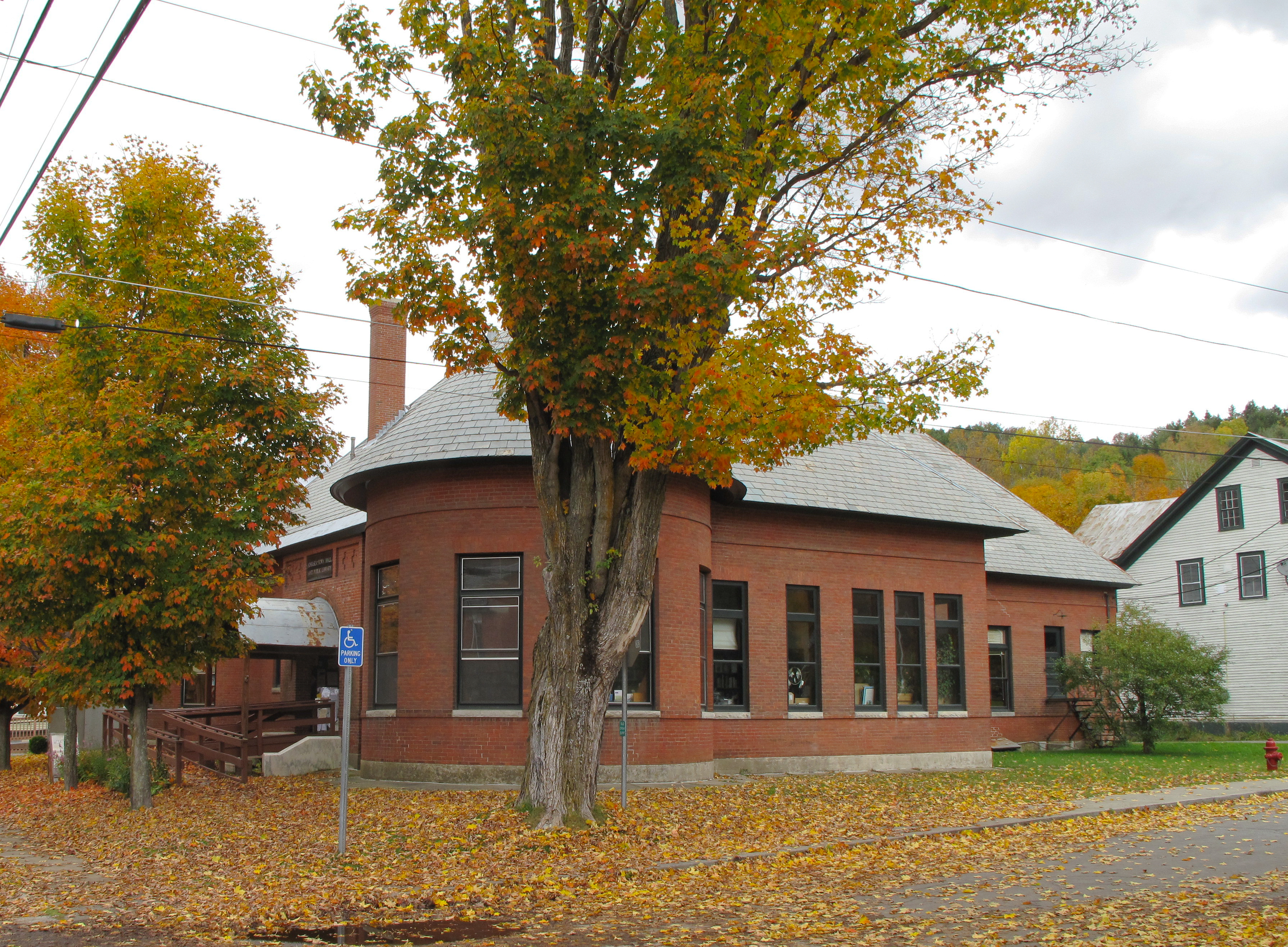
Chelsea Public Library

As of the census of 2010, there were 1,238 people, 541 households, and 334 families residing in the town. Of the 541 household 117 had children under the age of 18 living within them.

The racial makeup of the town was 96.1% White, 0.6% African American, 0.2% Native American, 0.2% Asian, Hispanic or Latino of any race were 1.5% of the population.

The median age of residents is 48.3. The median household income is $49,500. 89.2% of adults have earned a high school diploma or higher level of education. 17.9% of individuals live below the poverty line.

== History ==
The town was founded on August 4, 1781. It was originally called Turnersburgh after settler Bela Turner. In 1788 the townspeople of Turnersburgh approved a bill to rename the town Chelsea.

The first small schoolhouses were established in the early 1800s. By 1845 there were 18 schools operating around the town. In 1852 the Chelsea Academy was built in the village district. The Chelsea Academy burnt in 1870. In 1913 the "new" Chelsea High School building was built, this building still houses the Chelsea Public School today.

=== Historic sites ===
In 1983 the historic village center of Chelsea was placed on the National Register of Historic Places as the Chelsea Village Historic District. Chelsea also has two standalone structures listed on the National Register: the Congregational Church of Chelsea and the Moxley Covered Bridge.

Figure, the original Morgan horse, is buried in Chelsea.

== Barn Quilt Trail ==
In 2018 The Chelsea Arts Collective led a project to create a barn quilt trail in Chelsea. Barn quilts are painted pieces of plywood. Designs are often geometric and resemble the patchwork of a quilt.

== Popular culture ==
The following movies were filmed (either fully or partially) in Chelsea:

- The Last Stand Farmer (1976)
- The Gift of Love (1983)
- Vermont is for Lovers (1992)
- A Stranger in the Kingdom (1997)

== Notable people ==
- John L. Bacon, Chelsea and Hartford banker and State Treasurer
- Daniel Buck, US representative in the 4th States Congress
- Daniel Azro Ashley Buck, US representative for Vermont
- Berthold C. Coburn, member of the Vermont House of Representatives
- Alban Jasper Conant, portrait painter
- David Whitney Curtis, member of the Wisconsin State Assembly
- Edson S. Densmore, White House Chief Usher
- Robert S. Hale, US Representative from New York
- William Hebard, US representative for Vermont
- Lyman G. Hinckley, Lieutenant Governor of Vermont
- Calista Robinson Jones (1839-1913), National President of the Woman's Relief Corps
- Walter L. Kennedy, speaker of the Vermont House of Representatives
- F. Ray Keyser Sr., Justice of the Vermont Supreme Court
- F. Ray Keyser Jr., born and raised in Chelsea, 72nd governor of Vermont
- Burnham Martin, Lieutenant Governor of Vermont
- William A. Palmer, US senator and governor of Vermont
- James Parker and Robert Tullock, juvenile murderers, resided in Chelsea
- William Freeman Vilas, US senator from Wisconsin
- Stanley C. Wilson, resided in Chelsea, 62nd governor of Vermont
- John Young, governor of New York
