= F. Ray Keyser Sr. =

American politician

Associate Justice of the Vermont Supreme Court
- In office 1964–1975
- Preceded by: Harold C. Sylvester
- Succeeded by: Franklin S. Billings Jr.

Judge of the Vermont Superior Court
- In office 1956–1964
- Preceded by: James Stuart Holden
- Succeeded by: Harold C. Sylvester

Member of the Vermont House of Representatives from Chelsea
- In office 1937–1941
- Preceded by: Roy C. Mills
- Succeeded by: O. Fay Allen

State's Attorney of Orange County, Vermont
- In office December 1, 1931 – January 31, 1935
- Preceded by: William H. Adams
- Succeeded by: Stanley L. Chamberlin

Personal details
- Born: Frank Ray Keyser; September 29, 1898 Woodsville, New Hampshire
- Died: March 7, 2001 (aged 102) Rutland, Vermont
- Resting place: Highland Cemetery, Chelsea, Vermont
- Party: Republican
- Spouse(s): Ellen Larkin (m. 1921–1976, her death); Ruby Hackett (m. 1977–1999, her death)
- Children: 2 (including F. Ray Keyser Jr.)
- Education: Tufts University (attended); Norwich University (attended)
- Profession: Attorney; Judge

Military service
- Allegiance: United States
- Branch/service: United States Army
- Years of service: 1918–1919
- Rank: Private
- Unit: Student Army Training Corps, Tufts University
- Battles/wars: World War I

Frank Ray Keyser Sr. (September 29, 1898 – March 7, 2001) was an American politician, lawyer, and judge from Vermont. He was a lawyer in private practice and later a justice of the Vermont Supreme Court. His son F. Ray Keyser Jr. served as Speaker of the Vermont House of Representatives and later as governor of Vermont.

== Early life ==
Keyser was born on September 29, 1898, in Woodsville, New Hampshire, the son of Winifred S. and Harriett (Bailey) Keyser. He graduated from high school in Woodsville in 1917 and studied at Tufts University while enrolled in the Student Army Training Corps during World War I.

== Start of career ==
After being discharged, Keyser attended Norwich University from 1919 to 1920, and became a banker in Wells River, Chelsea and Lyndonville, Vermont, and then a schoolteacher in Chelsea. He studied law part-time with Stanley C. Wilson, was admitted to the bar in 1929, and practiced in Chelsea as Wilson's law partner. Wilson and Keyser later partnered with Deane C. Davis, and J. Ward Carver, and their firm was referred to as the state's greatest-ever collection of legal talent, in that it included two governors (Wilson and Davis), a Vermont Attorney General (Carver), and an associate justice of the Vermont Supreme Court (Keyser).

== Continued career ==
Keyser held many local offices, serving as school director, selectman, town moderator, auditor, tax collector, town counsel, and fire district committee member. He was elected in 1936 and 1938 to the Vermont House of Representatives. Keyser also served as Orange County State's Attorney, Secretary of Civil and Military Affairs (chief assistant) to Governor Lee E. Emerson, and (during World War II) chief enforcement officer for the federal Office of Price Administration. Keyser served as president of the Vermont Bar Association, and was a member of the local American Legion post and Masonic lodge.

== Judicial career ==
In October 1956, Governor Joseph B. Johnson appointed Keyser to the Superior Court. Keyser's son F. Ray Keyser Jr. became governor of Vermont in 1961. Keyser Sr. administered the oath of office to his son, the only time this has occurred in Vermont history. After eight years on the Superior Court bench, Keyser was appointed to the Vermont Supreme Court in October 1964, filling the vacancy caused when Associate Justice Harold C. Sylvester requested to return to the superior court bench. Keyser served on the Supreme Court for eleven years, until he reached the mandatory retirement age in 1974.

== Later life ==
After leaving the Supreme Court in 1975, Keyser continued to occasionally serve as a specially assigned judge for the Superior Court for almost twenty-five years, until he reached the age of eighty-eight, and continued practicing law until the age of ninety-five. In August 1979, Governor Richard A. Snelling appointed Keyser to lead the "Keyser Commission" to investigate the Vermont State Police after a series of misconduct scandals; the commission's April 1980 criticized the state police's internal affairs investigations and recommended changes to the Department of Public Safety.

== Death and burial ==
Keyser died on March 7, 2001, in Rutland, at the age of 102. He was buried at Highland Cemetery in Chelsea.

== Family ==
Keyser married Ellen Larkin of Chelsea on July 2, 1921; she died in 1976 after 55 years of marriage. Keyser married Ruby Hackett of Tunbridge on January 8, 1977. She died in June 1999, after 21 years of marriage. His children included son F. Ray Keyser Jr., daughter Natalie Keyser Niles, and step-daughter, Elaine R. Cilley.

Keyser was a lifelong fan of the Boston Red Sox.
