= Chelsea (CDP), Vermont =

Census-designated place in Vermont, United States

Chelsea, Vermont
- Census-designated place
- Location within Vermont Location within the United States
- Coordinates: 43°59′50″N 72°26′53″W
- Country: United States
- State: Vermont
- County: Orange
- Town: Chelsea

Area
  - Total: 0.89 sq mi (2.30 km^{2})
  - Land: 0.89 sq mi (2.30 km^{2})
  - Water: 0 sq mi (0.0 km^{2})
- Elevation: 817 ft (249 m)

Population (2020)
  - Total: 342
- Time zone: UTC-5 (Eastern (EST))
  - Summer (DST): UTC-4 (EDT)
- ZIP Code: 05038
- Area code: 802
- FIPS code: 50-13450
- GNIS feature ID: 2745367

Chelsea is the primary village and a census-designated place (CDP) in the town of Chelsea, Orange County, Vermont, United States. It was first listed as a CDP prior to the 2020 census.

== Geography ==
The CDP is in central Orange County, in the center of the town of Chelsea. It sits in the valley of the First Branch of the White River, part of the Connecticut River watershed. Vermont Route 110 runs through the village, leading north 13 miles (21 km) to East Barre and south the same distance to South Royalton. Vermont Route 113 has its western terminus in Chelsea and leads southeast 22 miles (35 km) to East Thetford, on the Connecticut River.
