= Edward Cashman =

American lawyer

Edward J. Cashman
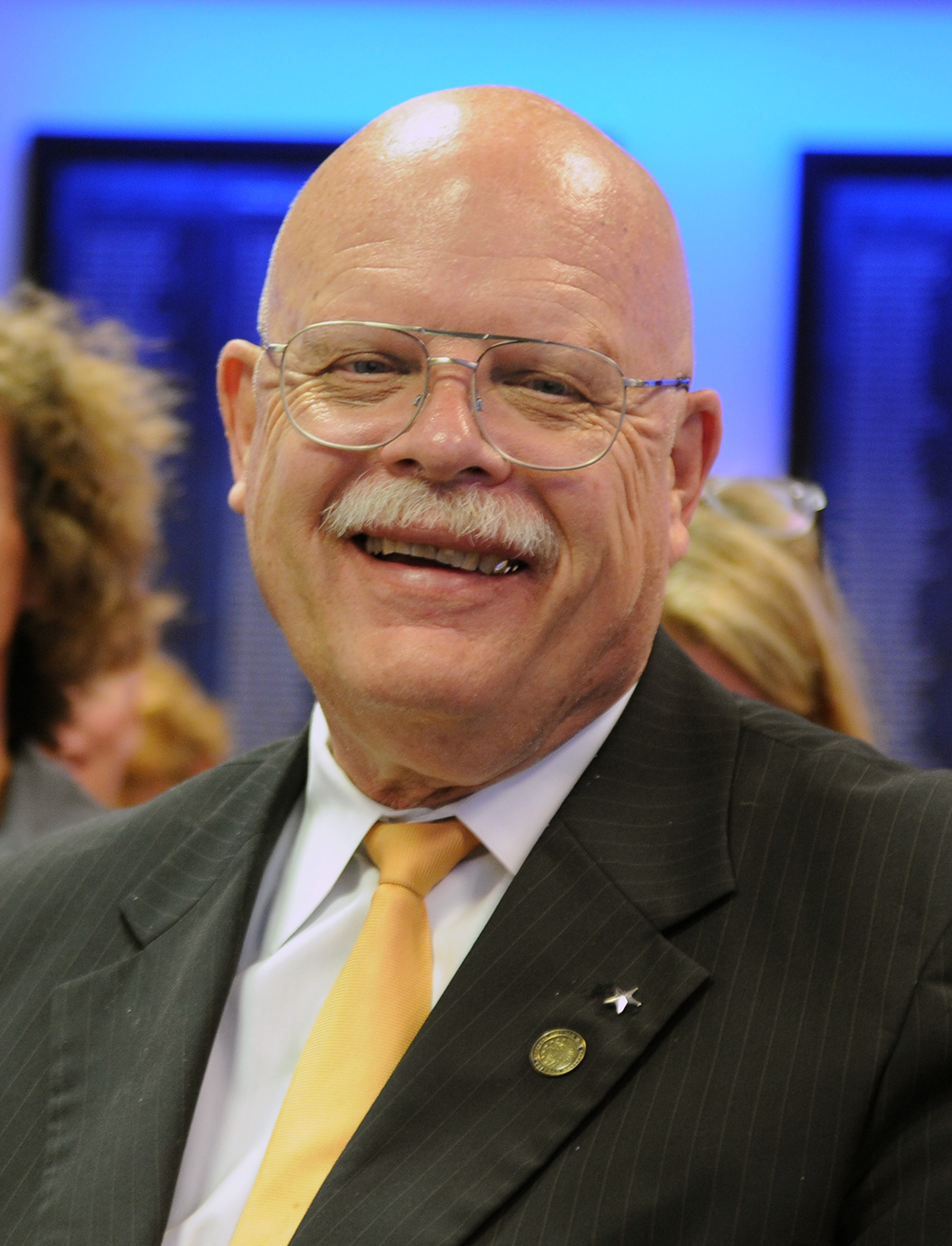
- Cashman in 2015

Judge of the Vermont Superior Court
- In office January 1982 – March 2007
- Appointed by: Richard A. Snelling

State Attorney of Grand Isle County
- In office 1978 – January 1982

Commissioner of the Vermont Public Service Board
- In office 1975–1978

Assistant Attorney General of Vermont
- In office 1971–1972

Personal details
- Born: April 18, 1943 (age 83) Elizabeth, New Jersey, U.S.
- Spouse: Gail Sylvester
- Education: Boston College (AB); American University (JD)
- Occupation: Judge, lawyer, professor, politician

Military service
- Branch/service: United States Army
- Years of service: 1969-1971
- Rank: Captain
- Battles/wars: Vietnam War

Edward J. Cashman (born April 18, 1943) is an American lawyer and retired judge from Vermont. He is a former state district court judge. Judge Cashman, a Vietnam veteran and Catholic of Irish descent, was appointed to the bench in 1982 by Republican Governor Richard A. Snelling. "Cashman worked for the attorney general's office, the Chittenden County clerk, served on the state Public Service Board and worked in private practice before becoming state's attorney in Grand Isle County in 1978.". In September 2006, Judge Cashman announced his pending retirement upon completion of his term in March 2007. Judge Cashman did retain his part-time employment with Johnson State College, teaching a course on constitutional law. In addition, Judge Cashman is an adjunct professor at Champlain College in Burlington, VT, where he teaches two criminal law courses.

== Personal life ==
Cashman was born in Elizabethtown, New Jersey. He attended Boston College, where he also served in the Reserve Officers' Training Corps for the United States Army. Cashman married Gail Sylvester, also a student at Boston College and the daughter of Vermont Supreme Court justice Harold C. Sylvester. Cashman completed his legal training at American University's Washington College of Law, and then served during the Vietnam War as a media relations officer for a year beginning in 1970.

Following his military service Cashman moved to Vermont and began a career in public service, including working for various public agencies and as an elected state's attorney (prosecutor) for Grand Isle County, Vermont. He joined the judiciary in 1982 upon his appointment by then-governor Richard A. Snelling to the district court.

After retiring from the bench in early 2007, Cashman taught classes at Champlain College and Johnson State College in Vermont and he continues to teach one course per semester at Champlain. He also volunteers at the Burlington Dismas House, a non-profit organization (sometimes known as a halfway house) which provides a bridge between prison and full release for inmates completing their sentence.

== Sentencing controversy ==
Judge Cashman was criticized in January 2006 for sentencing Mark Hulett, who pleaded guilty to child molestation, to 60 days to 10 years in prison plus a suspended sentence of three years to life that would take effect if the conditions of the initial sentence were violated. The victim, a girl who was six years old at the time the assaults began, was repeatedly molested for four years. Her parents were friends with Hulett, a frequent house guest. Hulett often shared a bed with the victim. According to Cashman, the Department of Correction rules at the time defined Hulett as "low risk to reoffend" which made him ineligible for sex offender treatment while in prison. The sentence required Hulett to spend 60 days in prison, and then allowed him to receive sex offender treatment upon his release. The proposal was key to convincing Hulett to plead guilty and avoid a trial, but also provided for a life sentence if Hulett failed to complete treatment, violated any terms of his release or re-offended. Following a media reaction and attention from state political leaders, the state Department of Corrections offered to treat Hulett in prison and revise its policy on providing treatment to low risk inmates, and Judge Cashman changed Hulett's sentence to 3–10 years.

=== Media reaction ===
WCAX-TV news opened the story on January 4: "There was outrage today when a Vermont judge handed out a 60-day jail sentence to a child rapist. The judge said he no longer believes in punishment and is more concerned about rehabilitation. Brian Joyce was at the sentencing hearing. He's live in the newsroom with more. Kristin, Prosecutors argued that confessed child-rapist Mark Hulett deserved at least eight years behind bars for repeatedly raping a little girl countless times starting when she was seven. But Judge Edward Cashman disagreed -- saying he has learned that punishment just does not work." In fact, Cashman had said that punishment alone is not enough - that offenders like Hulett required sex offender treatment to reduce the likelihood of re-offending.

Fox News commentator Bill O'Reilly kept the issue on the national stage on his television show and in his column by continuing to falsely claim that Cashman had said punishment didn't work. He accused national and regional media of ignoring the story. O'Reilly also discussed the case in his 2006 book Culture Warrior, in which he continued to make the false claim that Cashman had said he didn't believe in punishment and took credit for Cashman's re-sentencing of Hulett.

=== Aftermath ===
Cashman reported receiving death threats and hate mail, and received a temporary protection detail from the Vermont State Police. By September 2006, Cashman wrote to the Vermont Supreme Court that he would retire at the end of his term and not seek re-appointment.

Mark Hulett was released from prison on the morning of January 26, 2011 after serving five years of his sentence. He served more than his minimum sentence because he was unable to find housing that could meet the conditions of his release. Hulett remained under electronic monitoring by a GPS-tracking bracelet until June 2012 and had his computer usage tracked by the Department of Corrections. Hulett was required to register with the state as a sex offender.
