= 1962 Vermont gubernatorial election =

- November 6, 1962
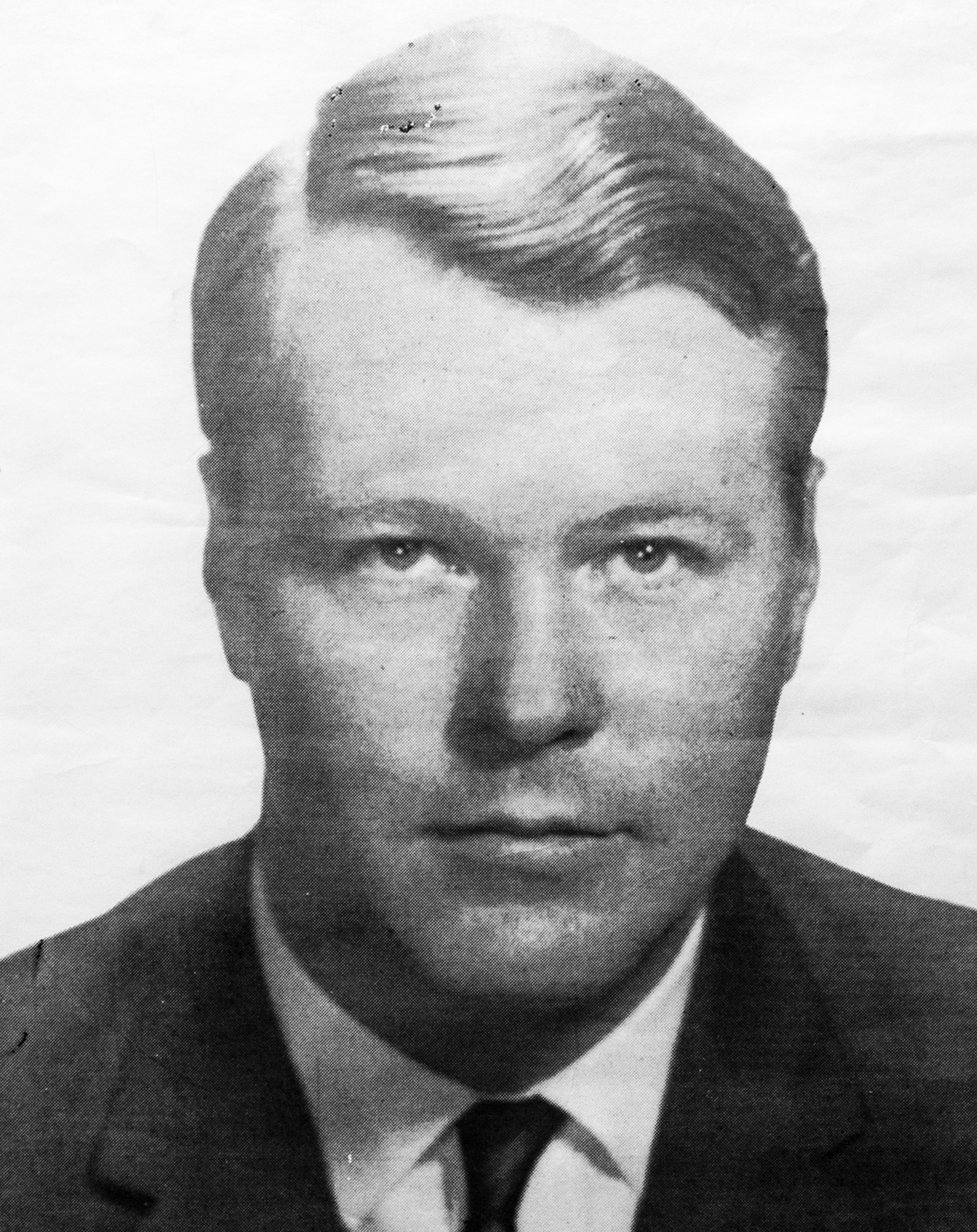

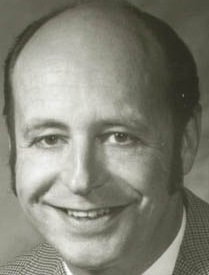
Nominee	Philip H. Hoff	F. Ray Keyser Jr.
Party	Democratic	Republican
Popular vote	61,350	60,035
Percentage	50.54%	49.46%
- County results Hoff: 50–60% 60–70% Keyser: 50–60% 60–70%
Governor before election
F. Ray Keyser Jr.
Republican
Elected Governor
Philip H. Hoff
Democratic

The 1962 Vermont gubernatorial election took place on November 6, 1962. Incumbent Republican F. Ray Keyser Jr. ran unsuccessfully for re-election to a second term as Governor of Vermont, losing to Democratic candidate Philip H. Hoff. Hoff was the first Democrat elected Governor of Vermont since 1853. This was also the last time an incumbent governor of Vermont was defeated for re-election.

Hoff appeared on the ballot with the Vermont Independent Party's line in order to receive support from those who would not vote on the Democratic line. At the time Vermont allowed a candidate to appear multiple times on the same ballot. The number of votes Hoff received on the Vermont Independent Party's ballot line was greater than his margin of victory. In 1977, the electoral laws were changed to limit candidates to appearing once on the ballot and prohibiting the usage of the word independent in a party's name.

== Republican primary ==
=== Results ===
Republican primary results
Party	Candidate	Votes	%	±%
Republican	F. Ray Keyser Jr. (inc.)	27,947	99.7	
Republican	Other	73	0.3	
Total votes		28,020	100.0	

== Democratic primary ==
=== Results ===
Democratic primary results
Party	Candidate	Votes	%	±%
Democratic	Philip H. Hoff	9,757	99.9	
Democratic	Other	8	0.1	
Total votes		9,765	100.0	

== General election ==
=== Results ===
1962 Vermont gubernatorial election
Party	Candidate	Votes	%	±%
Democratic	Philip H. Hoff	56,196	46.30	
Vermont Independent	Philip H. Hoff	3,282	2.70	
Independent Democrat	Philip H. Hoff	1,872	1.54	
Total	Philip H. Hoff	61,350	50.54	
Republican	F. Ray Keyser Jr. (inc.)	60,035	49.46	
N/A	Other	4	0.00	
Total votes		121,389	100.0	

== Works cited ==
- Johnson, Bertram (2020). Beyond Donkeys and Elephants: Minor Political Parties in Contemporary American Politics. University Press of Kansas. doi:10.2307/j.ctv15tt76n. ISBN 978-0-7006-2929-9.
