= Robert S. Babcock =

American politician (1915–1985)

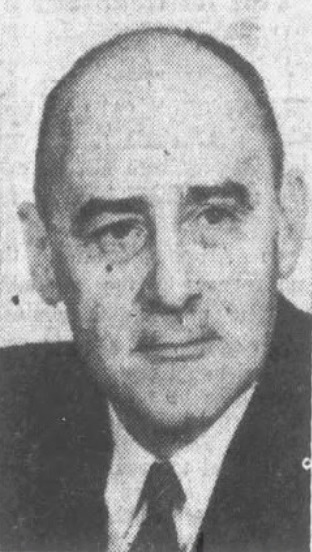

Member of the Vermont House of Representatives from Chittenden County District 5-2
- In office January 8, 1975 – January 7, 1981 Serving with Mary Barbara Maher
- Preceded by: Paul Graves, Wayne Jameson (District 11-2)
- Succeeded by: Mary Barbara Maher, Jeanne B. Kennedy

68th Lieutenant Governor of Vermont
- In office January 8, 1959 – January 4, 1961
- Governor: Robert Stafford
- Preceded by: Robert Stafford
- Succeeded by: Ralph A. Foote

President pro tempore of the Vermont Senate
- In office January 9, 1957 – January 8, 1959
- Preceded by: Asa S. Bloomer
- Succeeded by: Asa S. Bloomer

Member of the Vermont Senate from Chittenden County
- In office January 9, 1957 – January 8, 1959 Serving with Frederick Fayette, Russell F. Niquette, Hector Marcoux
- Preceded by: Hector T. Marcoux, Russell F. Niquette, Robert C. Spencer
- Succeeded by: Leslie Barry, Hector T. Marcoux, Frank R. O'Brien, Eugene A. Richard
- In office January 3, 1951 – January 4, 1955 Serving with Holger C. Petersen, Edward W. Mudgett, Fortis H. Abbott (1951); Fortis H. Abbott, Edward W. Mudgett, Morris R. Wilcox (1953)
- Preceded by: William L. Hammond, Charles P. Smith Jr., Holger C. Petersen, Aaron H. Grout
- Succeeded by: Leslie Barry, Hector T. Marcoux, Frank R. O'Brien, Eugene A. Richard

Personal details
- Born: Robert Shillingford Babcock; July 22, 1915 Evanston, Illinois, U.S.
- Died: September 1, 1985 (aged 70) Yuma, Arizona, U.S.
- Party: Republican
- Spouse: Alice-Anne Hanchett
- Children: 5
- Education: University of Rochester; University of Oxford; Northwestern University
- Profession: College professor

Military service
- Allegiance: United States
- Branch/service: United States Navy
- Years of service: 1943–1946
- Rank: Lieutenant (junior grade)
- Battles/wars: World War II

Robert Shillingford Babcock (July 22, 1915 – September 1, 1985) was an American college professor and politician from Vermont. A Republican, he was most notable for his service in both houses of the Vermont General Assembly, and as lieutenant governor from 1959 to 1961.

== Early life ==
Babcock was born in Evanston, Illinois on July 22, 1915, the son of Martha (née Shillingford) and Oliver Babcock. He graduated from Evanston High School, then attended the University of Rochester, where he joined the Psi Upsilon fraternity and graduated with an AB in 1937. Babcock was a member of Phi Beta Kappa, played on the football, baseball, and basketball teams, and earned Little All-America honors in football.

He was a Rhodes Scholar at Balliol College of the University of Oxford, from which he received an AB in 1939. He then taught government and politics at Black Mountain College in North Carolina. In 1942, he was hired by the United States Department of the Treasury, and worked in Washington, D.C. as a commercial control specialist. In this role, Babcock was responsible for reviewing applications for foreign business transactions that involved the use of funds that had been frozen by executive order at the start of the war.

He served in the United States Navy during World War II and attained the rank of lieutenant (junior grade). He saw combat in the Mediterranean and Middle East theater. Babcock was discharged at the end of the war and began teaching political science at the University of Vermont. In 1949, he received his PhD from Northwestern University.

== Political career ==
In 1950, Babcock was elected to the Vermont Senate, and he served two terms, 1951 to 1955. He was an alternate delegate to the 1952 Republican National Convention. Babcock was defeated for reelection to his senate seat in 1954, but was appointed secretary of civil and military affairs (chief assistant) to Governor Joseph B. Johnson in 1955.

In 1956, Babcock was again elected to the state senate. He served one term, 1957 to 1959, and was selected to serve as the body's president pro tempore.

Babcock served as the 68th lieutenant governor of Vermont from 1959 to 1961. In 1960, he ran unsuccessfully for the Republican gubernatorial nomination, losing to F. Ray Keyser Jr., who went on to win the general election. In 1964, he was again a candidate for governor, and lost the Republican nomination to Ralph A. Foote.

== Later career ==
In 1965, Babcock was appointed provost of the Vermont State Colleges system. Babcock later served three terms in the Vermont House of Representatives (1975–1981). He was an unsuccessful candidate for reelection in 1980, and in retirement he was a resident of Arizona. Babcock died in Yuma on September 1, 1985.

== Family ==
Babcock was the husband of Alice-Anne Hanchett Babcock. They were the parents of five children, three daughters and two sons—Robert Jr., Peter, Ann, Julie, and Martha.

== Legacy ==
The Babcock Nature Preserve in Eden, Vermont is named for Robert and Alice-Anne Babcock. The site contains a bog, three ponds, and 1,000 acres of forest land, and was donated by the Babcocks to the Vermont State Colleges. The preserve is used a laboratory for students of field biology, ornithology, and environmental and natural science, and is maintained by Northern Vermont University.

A collection of Babcock's writings, the Robert S. Babcock Papers, are part of the Jack and Shirley Silver Special Collections Library at the University of Vermont. The Babcock papers include manuscripts for his column in the Burlington Free Press, radio and TV addresses on WCAX Radio and WCAX-TV, and a collection of his writings from his service in the state legislature.

In 2017, Babcock was inducted into the Vermont State Colleges Hall of Fame. Babcock is also a member of the Athletic Hall of Fame at the University of Rochester.

Party political offices
Preceded by Robert Stafford	Republican nominee for Lieutenant Governor of Vermont; 1958	Succeeded by Ralph A. Foote
Political offices
Preceded by Robert T. Stafford	Lieutenant Governor of Vermont; 1959–1961	Succeeded by Ralph A. Foote
