= Berthold C. Coburn =

American politician (1899–1956)

Member of the Vermont House of Representatives
- In office 1953–1955
- Preceded by: Alice B. Allen
- Succeeded by: F. Ray Keyser Jr.
- Constituency: Chelsea

Personal details
- Born: January 14, 1899 Belvidere, Vermont, U.S.
- Died: February 28, 1956 (aged 57) Chelsea, Vermont, U.S.
- Resting place: Belvidere Center Cemetery, Belvidere, Vermont, U.S.
- Party: Democratic
- Education: Vermont School of Agriculture
- Occupation: Insurance agent

Berthold C. Coburn (January 14, 1899 – February 28, 1956) was an American politician. He served as a Democratic member of the Vermont House of Representatives.

== Life and career ==
Coburn was a native of Belvidere, Vermont on January 14, 1899. He attended the local schools and the T. N. Vail School of Agriculture. In 1921, he graduated from the Vermont School of Agriculture. Coburn settled in Chelsea, where he worked as a cooperative fire insurance agent.

Active in politics as a Democrat, Coburn served as chairman of the Chelsea Democratic Committee and the Orange County Democratic Committee, in addition to serving on the Vermont Democratic Committee for eight years. He also served in local offices including justice of the peace and town lister. In 1946, he was the unsuccessful Democratic nominee for governor of Vermont. Coburn served in the Vermont House of Representatives from 1953 to 1955.

Coburn was the husband of Gertrude M. Walker; they were married until her death in 1955, and had no children. He died at his brother's home in Chelsea on February 28, 1956, at the age of 57.
