= John J. Daley =

American high school teacher and politician (1923–2000)

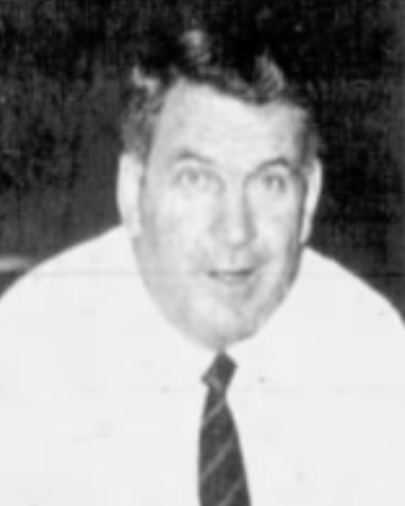
- Daley in 1968

Lieutenant Governor of Vermont
- In office 1965–1969
- Governor: Philip H. Hoff
- Preceded by: Ralph A. Foote
- Succeeded by: Thomas L. Hayes

Member of the Vermont House of Representatives from the Rutland 6-2 District
- In office 1991–1995
- Preceded by: Walter M. Moore
- Succeeded by: Thomas Alberico (District 6-1)

Mayor of Rutland City, Vermont
- In office 1981–1987
- Preceded by: Gilbert G. Godnick
- Succeeded by: Jeffery N. Wennberg
- In office 1961–1965
- Preceded by: Dan J. Healy
- Succeeded by: Harold J. Nichols

Personal details
- Born: June 21, 1923 Rutland City, Vermont
- Died: June 15, 2000 (aged 76) Rutland City, Vermont
- Resting place: Evergreen Cemetery, Rutland Town, Vermont
- Party: Democratic
- Spouse: Mary Creed (m. 1947)
- Children: 11
- Education: Norwich University
- Profession: Junior high school teacher and coach

Military service
- Allegiance: United States
- Branch/service: United States Marine Corps
- Years of service: 1942–1946
- Rank: Private First Class
- Unit: 1st Marine Division
- Battles/wars: World War II: Asiatic-Pacific Theater; Invasion of Okinawa

John J. Daley (June 21, 1923 – June 15, 2000) was an American high school teacher and politician from Vermont. A Democrat, he was most notable for his service as Mayor of Rutland (1961–1965, 1981–1987), and lieutenant governor (1965–1969). In his later years, Daley served two terms in the Vermont House of Representatives (1991–1995).

== Biography ==
John James Daley was born in Rutland on June 21, 1923. He graduated from Mount St. Joseph Academy in 1942. He joined the United States Marine Corps for World War II, serving with the 1st Marine Division in the Pacific Theatre of Operations, including the invasion of Okinawa and assignment to China.

After the war Daley completed his education at Norwich University, receiving his bachelor's degree in 1949 and embarking on a career as a pharmaceutical sales representative. He later became a teacher and coach at Rutland Junior High School. A Democrat, Daley served on the Rutland Board of Aldermen from 1956 to 1960, including two years as president of the board. From 1961 to 1965, Daley served as Rutland's mayor.

Daley served two terms (1965–1969) as the 70th lieutenant governor of Vermont. Elected during the governorship of Philip H. Hoff, they were the first Democrats to hold Vermont's top two state government posts since the founding of the Republican Party in the 1850s.

In 1968 Daley ran unsuccessfully for governor, losing to Deane C. Davis. He ran again in 1970, losing in the Democratic primary to state senator Lee O'Brien.

From 1969 to 1981 he taught social studies and coached football at Rutland Junior High School, and he was also a football and basketball referee for amateur sports in the Rutland area for many years.

Daley served as Rutland's mayor for a second time from 1981 to 1987. In 1992 Daley was elected to the Vermont House of Representatives, serving two terms.

== Personal life ==
Daley married Mary Creed in 1947. They had 11 children.

John J. Daley died in Rutland on June 15, 2000. He is buried in Rutland's Evergreen Cemetery.

== See also ==
- List of lieutenant governors of Vermont
- List of mayors of Rutland, Vermont

Party political offices
| Preceded by Frederick Delaney, Jr. | Democratic nominee for Lieutenant Governor of Vermont; 1964, 1966 | Succeeded by William A. Hunter |
| Preceded by Philip H. Hoff | Democratic nominee for Governor of Vermont; 1968 | Succeeded by Leo O'Brien, Jr. |
Political offices
| Preceded by Ralph A. Foote | Lieutenant Governor of Vermont; 1965–1969 | Succeeded by Thomas L. Hayes |
