= Chelsea Village Historic District =

Historic district in Vermont, United States

- U.S. National Register of Historic Places
- U.S. Historic district
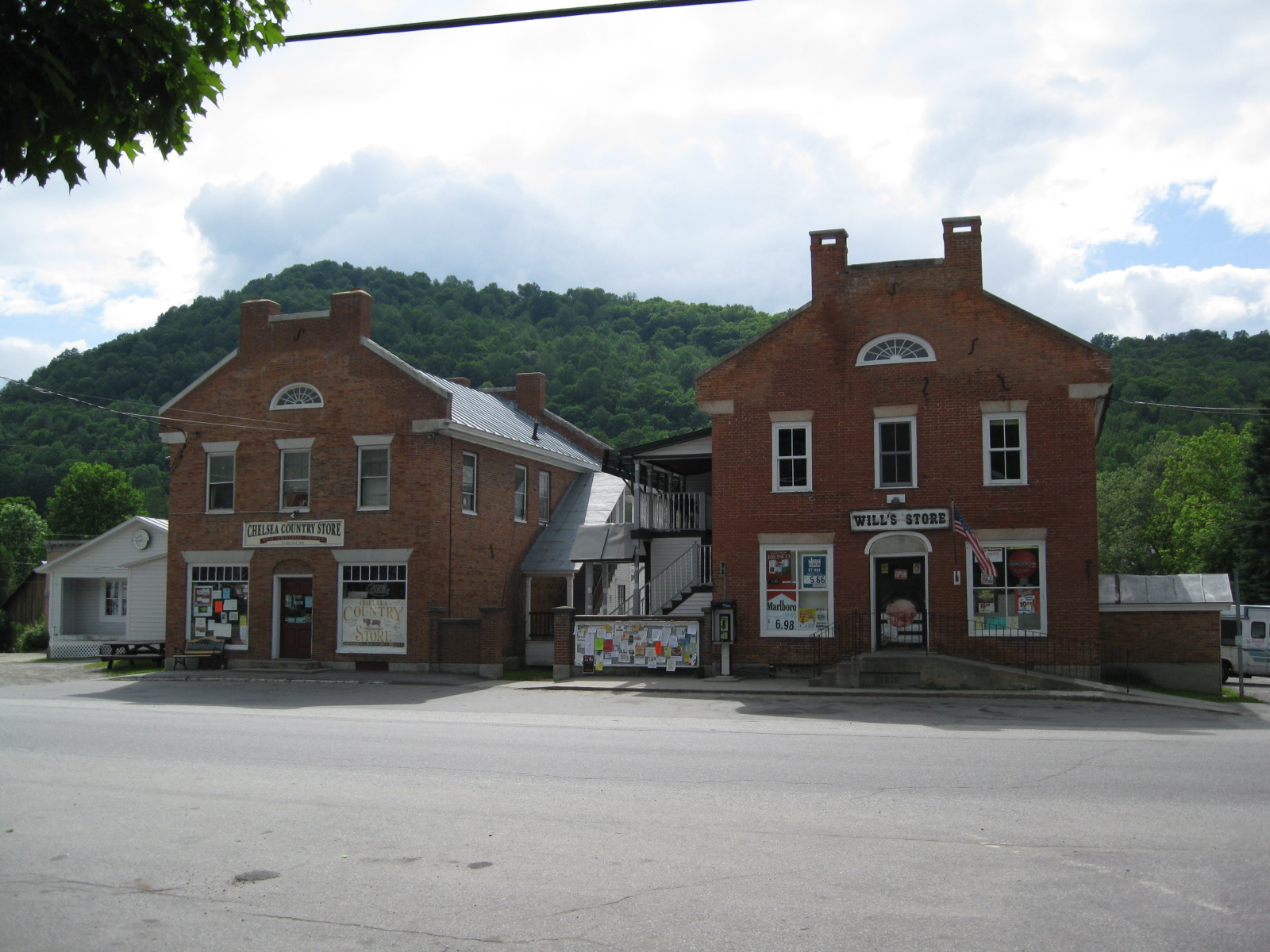

- Location within Vermont Location within the United States
- Location: N. and S. Main, Jail, School, Court and Church Sts., Maple and Highland Aves., Chelsea, Vermont
- Coordinates: 43°59′23″N 72°26′51″W
- Area: 65 acres (26 ha)
- Architectural style: Greek Revival and other styles
- NRHP reference No.: 83003212
- Added to NRHP: September 29, 1983

The Chelsea Village Historic District encompasses the historic village center of Chelsea, Vermont, the shire town of Orange County. Developed in the first half of the 19th century as a regional service and transportation hub, the village exhibits a significant number of Greek Revival buildings, augmented with primarily later civic and commercial buildings. It was listed on the National Register of Historic Places in 1983.

== Description and history ==
The town of Chelsea grew up along the banks of the First Branch White River in central Orange County. It was settled in 1784 and became the county seat of Orange County in 1795. In the 19th century it developed as a regional service center for the neighboring rural communities, and also fostered modest industry, primarily small textile, grist, and sawmills, now mostly lost. Its greatest period of growth was between 1830 and 1850, with the result that much of its architecture is in the Greek Revival style popular during that period.

The village is laid out mainly north-south along what is now Vermont Route 113, but was in the 19th century a stagecoach route. Its central focus is a pair of town commons, separated from each other by Jail Brook and a strips of buildings lining the brook. The north common was established in 1794 as a public parade and militia training ground, while that to the south was given in 1804 as a site for the county courthouse. Arrayed around the common and along Main, Maple, and Jail Brook Streets are a fine collection of late Federal and Greek Revival buildings, mostly residential, although some commercial buildings survive from that period as well. Prominent buildings from this period include the courthouse (1847) and Congregational church (1848), both fine high-style Greek Revival buildings. The town hall and library, both built in the 1890s, are in the later Romanesque Revival style.

== See also ==
- National Register of Historic Places listings in Orange County, Vermont
