= Philip H. Hoff =

American politician (1924–2018)

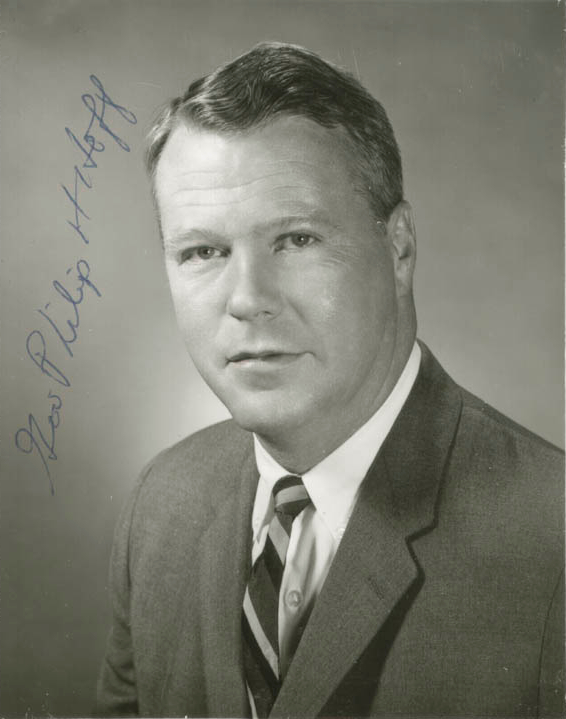

73rd Governor of Vermont
- In office January 10, 1963 – January 9, 1969
- Lieutenant: Ralph A. Foote; John J. Daley
- Preceded by: F. Ray Keyser Jr.
- Succeeded by: Deane C. Davis

Member of the Vermont Senate
- In office 1983–1989 Serving with George Little Jr., Dennis Delaney, Thomas Crowley, Doug Racine (1982, 1984, 1986), Sallie Soule, (1982), Sally Conrad (1984, 1986)
- Preceded by: Thomas Crowley, Esther Sorrell, Robert V. "Bill" Daniels, Mark Kaplan, E. Douglas McSweeney, Sallie Soule
- Succeeded by: Sally Conrad, Thomas Crowley, Doug Racine, George Little Jr., Hilton Wick, Stephen Blodgett
- Constituency: Chittenden County

Chairman of the Vermont Democratic Party
- In office 1973–1975
- Preceded by: Leonard Wilson
- Succeeded by: Robert Branon

Member of the Vermont House of Representatives
- In office 1961–1963
- Preceded by: Joseph E. Moore
- Succeeded by: Richard H. Schmidt
- Constituency: Burlington

Personal details
- Born: Philip Henderson Hoff; June 29, 1924 Turners Falls, Massachusetts, U.S.
- Died: April 26, 2018 (aged 93) Shelburne, Vermont, U.S.
- Party: Democratic
- Spouse: Joan Brower (m. 1948)
- Children: 4
- Education: Williams College; Cornell Law School

Military service
- Branch/service: United States Navy
- Years of service: 1942–1946
- Rank: Seaman First Class
- Unit: USS Sea Dog
- Battles/wars: World War II

Philip Henderson Hoff (June 29, 1924 – April 26, 2018) was an American politician from the U.S. state of Vermont. He was most notable for his service as the 73rd governor of Vermont from 1963 to 1969, the state's first Democratic governor since 1853.

== Life and career ==
Hoff was born in Turners Falls, Massachusetts, the son of Agnes (Henderson) and Olaf Hoff, Jr. His father worked in the insurance industry and served two terms in the Massachusetts House of Representatives. Hoff was a star high school football player, scoring the winning touchdown in Turners Falls High School's 1942 annual game against rival Greenfield High School.

Hoff attended Williams College, where he studied English, but postponed graduation for two years in order to serve in World War II. He enisted in December 1942 and saw combat action during World War II aboard the submarine, USS Sea Dog, which took part in combat patrols throughout the Pacific Ocean theater. He attained the rank of Seaman First Class with the rating of quartermaster (the Navy's term for a navigator), and was discharged in 1946. He met his wife, Joan Brower, during his naval service and they married in 1948. After graduating from Williams College in 1948, he attended Cornell Law School, where he joined the Phi Delta Phi fraternity and graduated in 1951. The Hoffs were the parents of four daughters―Susan, Dagny, Andrea, and Gretchen.

The Hoffs moved to Burlington, Vermont, in 1951, where Hoff began a law practice. He also became involved in local politics as a Democrat, and was a founder of the activist group Vermont Democratic Volunteers. In addition to serving as a justice of the peace, he was also chairman of the city zoning board. Hoff was also an officer of the Chittenden County Bar Association and a member of the Burlington-Lake Champlain Chamber of Commerce board of directors.

== Political career ==
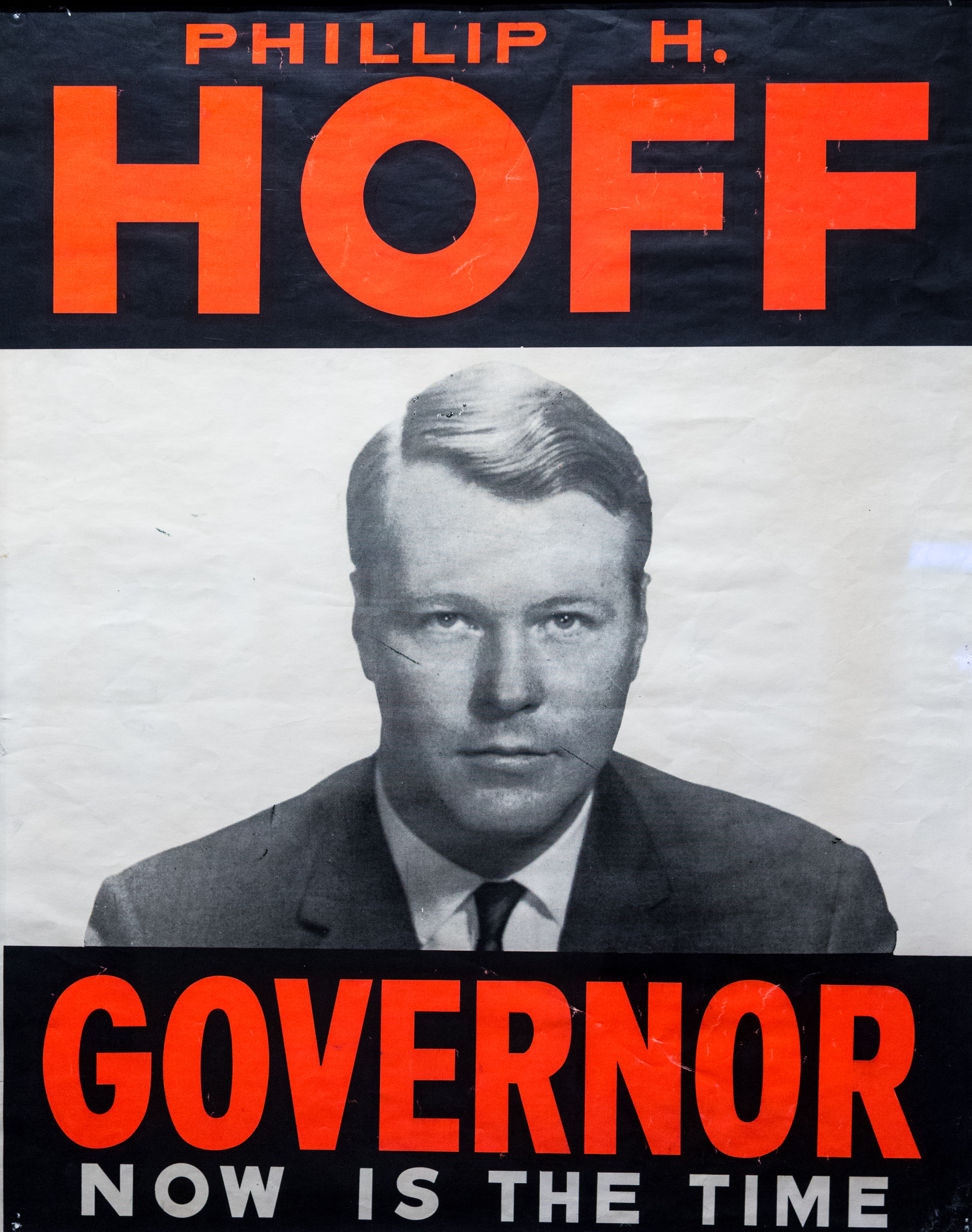
Poster from Hoff's 1962 campaign. Note misspelling of first name.

Hoff was elected to the Vermont House of Representatives in 1960, and served one term, 1961 to 1963. As a legislator, Hoff was a member of the "Young Turks," a bipartisan alliance of progressive and reform minded representatives and senators that included Republicans Franklin S. Billings Jr. and Ernest W. Gibson III.

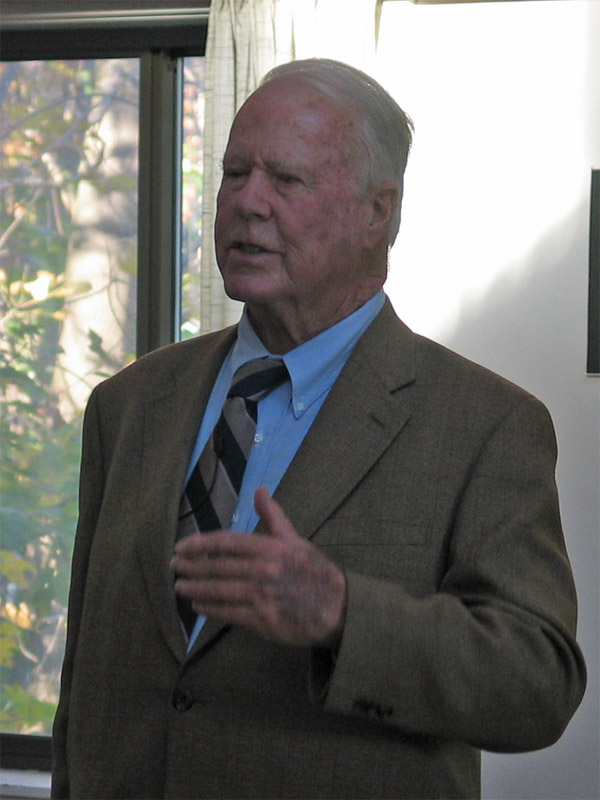
Hoff in 2004

In 1962, Hoff was elected Vermont's first Democratic governor since the Vermont General Assembly selected John S. Robinson after no candidate obtained a popular vote majority in 1853. Hoff waged an energetic campaign against incumbent Republican F. Ray Keyser Jr., and capitalized on local factors including a split between Vermont's conservative and progressive Republicans (the Proctor Wing and the Aiken-Gibson Wing). Rather than support the conservative Keyser, many of Vermont's liberal Republicans opted to support Hoff on a third party line, which contributed to his narrow margin of victory. Hoff was also aided by national factors, including the popularity of incumbent Democratic President John F. Kennedy, to whom Hoff was often compared.

Hoff won reelection in 1964 and 1966. During his governorship, he pioneered unprecedented environmental, development, and social welfare programs, including the creation of the Governor's Commission on the Status of Women. Concerned about racial justice, he joined with New York Mayor John Lindsay to co-found the Vermont-New York Youth Project, which brought minority students from the city together with Vermont students to work on joint summer projects at several Vermont colleges. According to the Boston Globe, the program, which temporarily doubled Vermont's black population, "uncovered some latent bigotry that had not been visible before." The poll tax was eliminated during his tenure as governor, and the Vermont Student Assistance Corporation, Legal Aid and Vermont Public Television were established.

Hoff was the first Democratic Governor in the nation to split with President Lyndon Johnson over the Vietnam War and later campaigned across the country to promote Robert F. Kennedy's effort to obtain the 1968 Democratic presidential nomination. After Kennedy's assassination, Hoff endorsed Eugene McCarthy. Democrats who opposed Johnson came close to nominating Hoff as a candidate for Vice President at the 1968 Democratic National Convention, but after some initial enthusiasm, Hoff declined to put his name forward.

Hoff's endorsement of Kennedy and later McCarthy upset conservative Democrats and Hoff was also criticized for increases in state spending which some claimed led to hefty deficits. In 1970, Hoff challenged incumbent U.S. Senator Winston L. Prouty, but Prouty easily won reelection. During the campaign, Hoff announced that he had battled alcoholism in the past. Had he won, Hoff would have been the first Democratic senator in Vermont history.

In the 1980s he returned to elective politics, serving three terms in the Vermont State Senate (1983-1989). He also served in various advisory and honorary positions and as President of the Board of Trustees at Vermont Law School as well as continuing his work as a lawyer in private practice. In 1989, he co-founded the law firm of Hoff, Curtis.

== Death ==
Hoff died at an assisted living facility in Shelburne, Vermont, on April 26, 2018, at age 93.

== Legacy ==
Hoff was the subject of a biography, 2011's Philip Hoff: How Red Turned Blue in the Green Mountain State by Samuel B. Hand, Anthony Marro, and Stephen C. Terry.

In 2012, Castleton State College named its newest residence hall after Hoff, the first building to be named in his honor.

Party political offices
| Preceded by Russell Niquette | Democratic nominee for Governor of Vermont; 1962, 1964, 1966 | Succeeded by John J. Daley |
| Preceded by Frederick Fayette | Democratic nominee for U.S. Senator from Vermont (Class 1); 1970 | Succeeded by Randolph Major |
Political offices
| Preceded by F. Ray Keyser Jr. | Governor of Vermont; 1963–1969 | Succeeded by Deane Davis |
