= Randolph Rogers =

American sculptor

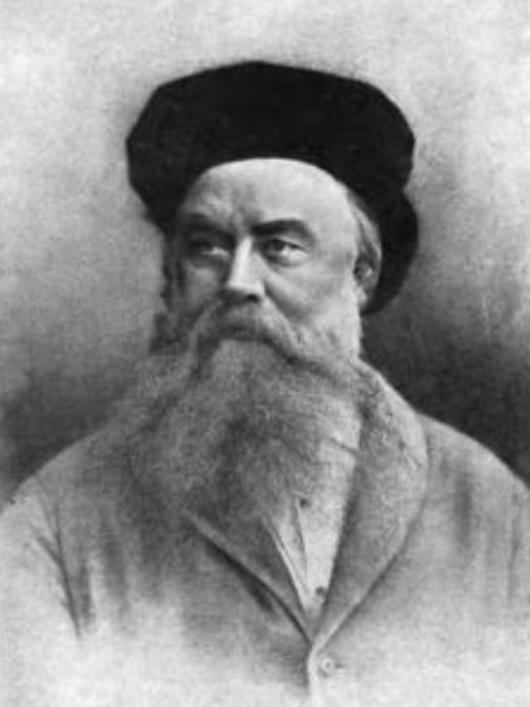
Randolph Rogers

Randolph Rogers (July 6, 1825 in Waterloo, New York – January 15, 1892 in Rome, Italy) was an American Neoclassical sculptor. An expatriate who lived most of his life in Italy, his works ranged from popular subjects to major commissions, including the Columbus Doors at the U.S. Capitol and American Civil War monuments. He died in Rome Italy on January 15 1892 at age 66.

== Biography ==
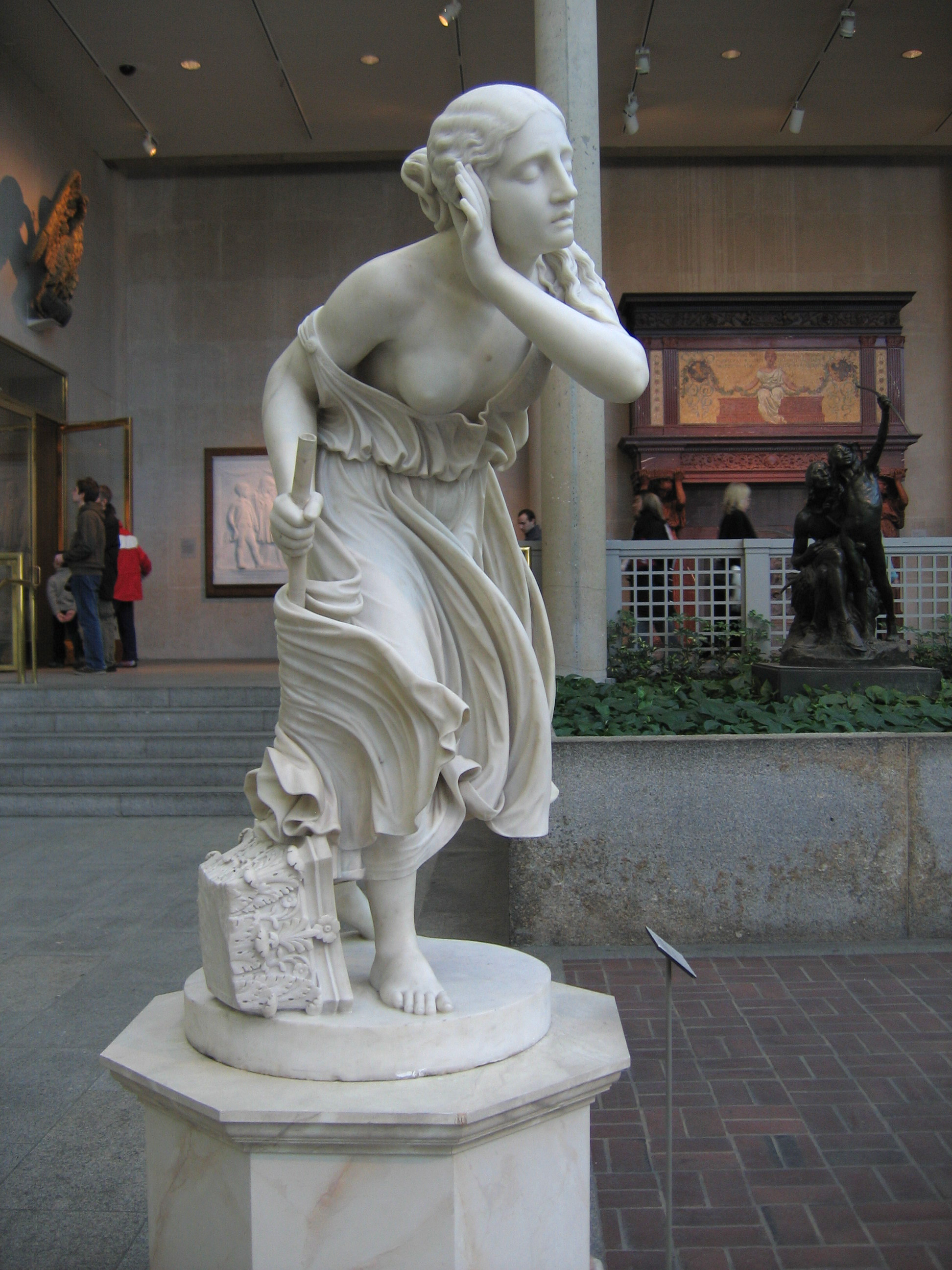
Nydia, the Blind Flower Girl of Pompeii (1853–54), Metropolitan Museum of Art, New York City.

Rogers was born in Waterloo, New York, and his family moved to Ann Arbor, Michigan when he was a child.

He developed an interest in wood cuts and wood engraving, and moved to New York City about 1847, but was unsuccessful in finding employment as an engraver. While working as a clerk in a dry-goods store, his employers discovered his native talent as a sculptor and provided funds for him to travel to Italy. He began study in Florence in 1848, where he studied briefly under Lorenzo Bartolini. He then opened a studio in Rome in 1851. He resided in that city until his death in 1892.

He began his career carving statues of children and portrait busts of tourists. He was not happy working with marble consequently all his marble statues were copied in his studio by Italian artisans under his supervision, from an original produced by him in another material. This also enabled him to profit from his popular works. His first large-scale work was Ruth Gleaning (1853), based on a figure in the Old Testament. It proved extremely popular, and up to 20 marble replicas were produced by his studio. His next large-scale work was Nydia, the Blind Flower Girl of Pompeii (1853–54), based on a character in Edward Bulwer-Lytton's best-selling 1834 novel, The Last Days of Pompeii. It proved even more popular, and his studio produced at least 77 marble replicas.

In 1855 he received his first major commission in the United States: great bronze doors for the East Front of the United States Capitol. He chose to depict scenes from the life of Christopher Columbus. The Columbus Doors were modeled in Rome, cast in Munich, and installed in Washington, DC in 1871.

In 1854, Rogers along with William Wetmore Story, Richard Greenough, and Thomas Crawford were each commissioned by Mount Auburn Cemetery to create statues of famous Bostonians to be displayed in the cemetery's chapel. Rogers was commissioned to create a statue of President John Adams. In September 1857, Rogers shipped the completed marble sculpture from Rome, but the ship was lost at sea before its arrival. Rogers was then commissioned to create another copy of his sculpture of "John Adams" and was contracted to create a marble version of Thomas Crawford's plaster sculpture "James Otis" after Crawfords died suddenly. (All of the sculptures were transferred to the Harvard Art Museums in 1935)

Following the 1857 death of sculptor Thomas Crawford, Rogers completed the sculpture program of the Washington Monument at the State Capitol in Richmond.

He designed four major American Civil War monuments: the Soldiers' National Monument (1865–1869) at Gettysburg National Cemetery; the Rhode Island Soldiers' and Sailors' Monument (1866–1871) in Providence; the Michigan Soldiers' and Sailors' Monument (1867–1872) in Detroit; and the Soldiers' Monument (1871–1874) in Worcester, Massachusetts.

He modeled The Genius of Connecticut (1877–1878), a bronze goddess that adorned the dome of the Connecticut State Capitol in Hartford. It was damaged in a 1938 hurricane, removed, and melted down for scrap metal during World War II. A plaster cast of the statue is now exhibited within the building.

In 1873 he became the first American to be elected to Italy's Accademia di San Luca, and he was knighted in 1884 by King Umberto I.

Rogers suffered a stroke in 1882, and was never able to work again. He left his papers and plaster casts of his sculptures to the University of Michigan, where there is also a Nydia replica.

== Selected works ==
=== List ===
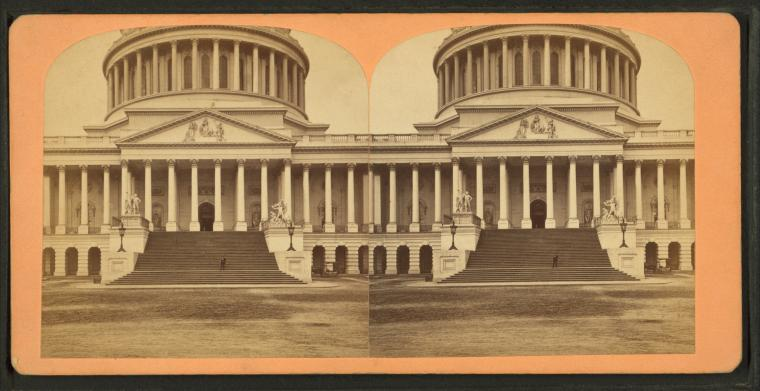
East Front of the U.S. Capitol (c. 1875), showing Rogers's Columbus Doors (center, at top of stairs).

- Ruth Gleaning (1853), Metropolitan Museum of Art, New York City.
- Nydia, the Blind Flower Girl of Pompeii (1853–1854), Metropolitan Museum of Art, New York City.
- John Adams (1854–1859), Memorial Hall, Harvard University, Cambridge, Massachusetts.
- Columbus Doors (1855–1861), East Front, United States Capitol, Washington, D.C.
- Thomas Nelson, Meriwether Lewis, 6 allegorical figures (1857–1858), Washington Monument, Virginia State Capitol, Richmond, Virginia.
- Angel of the Resurrection (1862), Samuel Colt Monument, Cedar Hill Cemetery, Hartford, Connecticut.
- Isaac on the Altar (1863–1864), Brooklyn Museum of Art, Brooklyn, New York City
- La Somnambula (1863–1864), Smithsonian American Art Museum, Washington, D.C.
- The Sentinel (1863–1865), Spring Grove Cemetery, Cincinnati, Ohio. One of Ohio's first formal Civil War monuments.
- Soldiers' National Monument (1865–1869), Gettysburg National Cemetery, Gettysburg, Pennsylvania, George Keller, architect.
- Rhode Island Soldiers' and Sailors' Monument (1866–1871), Kennedy Square, Providence, Rhode Island, Alfred Stone, architect.
- Michigan Soldiers' and Sailors' Monument (1867–1872), Detroit, Michigan.
- Abraham Lincoln (1870–1871), East Fairmount Park, Philadelphia, Pennsylvania.
- Soldiers' Monument (1871–1874), Worcester, Massachusetts.
- The Lost Pleiade (1874), The Art Institute of Chicago, Chicago, Illinois. Sculpture group of feuding tribes.
- William H. Seward Monument (1875–1876), Madison Square, New York City.
- The Genius of Connecticut (1877–1878), Connecticut State Capitol, Hartford, Connecticut.
- The Last Arrow (statuette) (1879–1880), Metropolitan Museum of Art, New York City.
- The Infant Psyche (bust of the artist's daughter Nora) (c. 1880), Cincinnati Art Museum, Cincinnati, Ohio.

=== Images ===
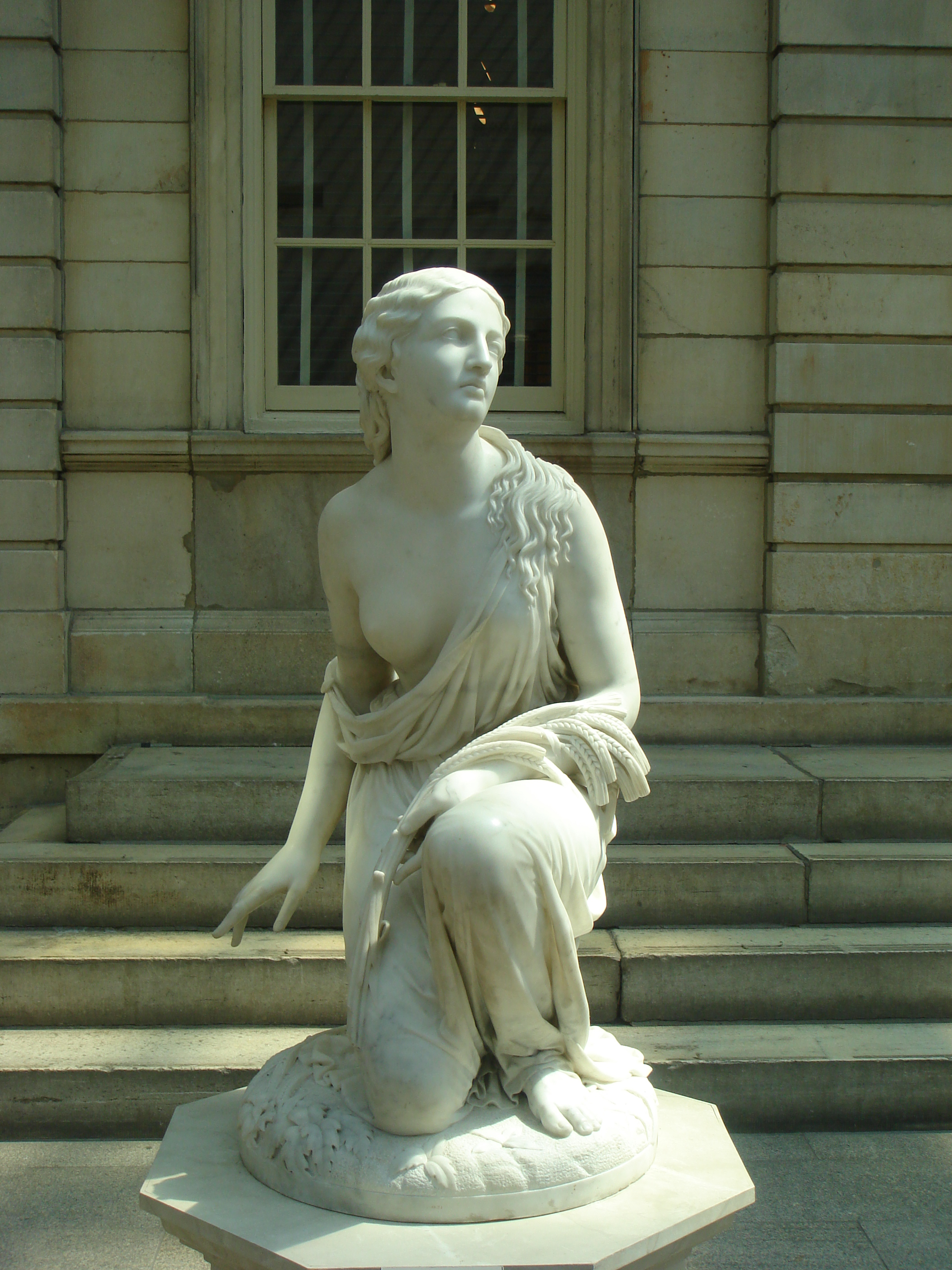
Ruth Gleaning (1853), Metropolitan Museum of Art, New York City.

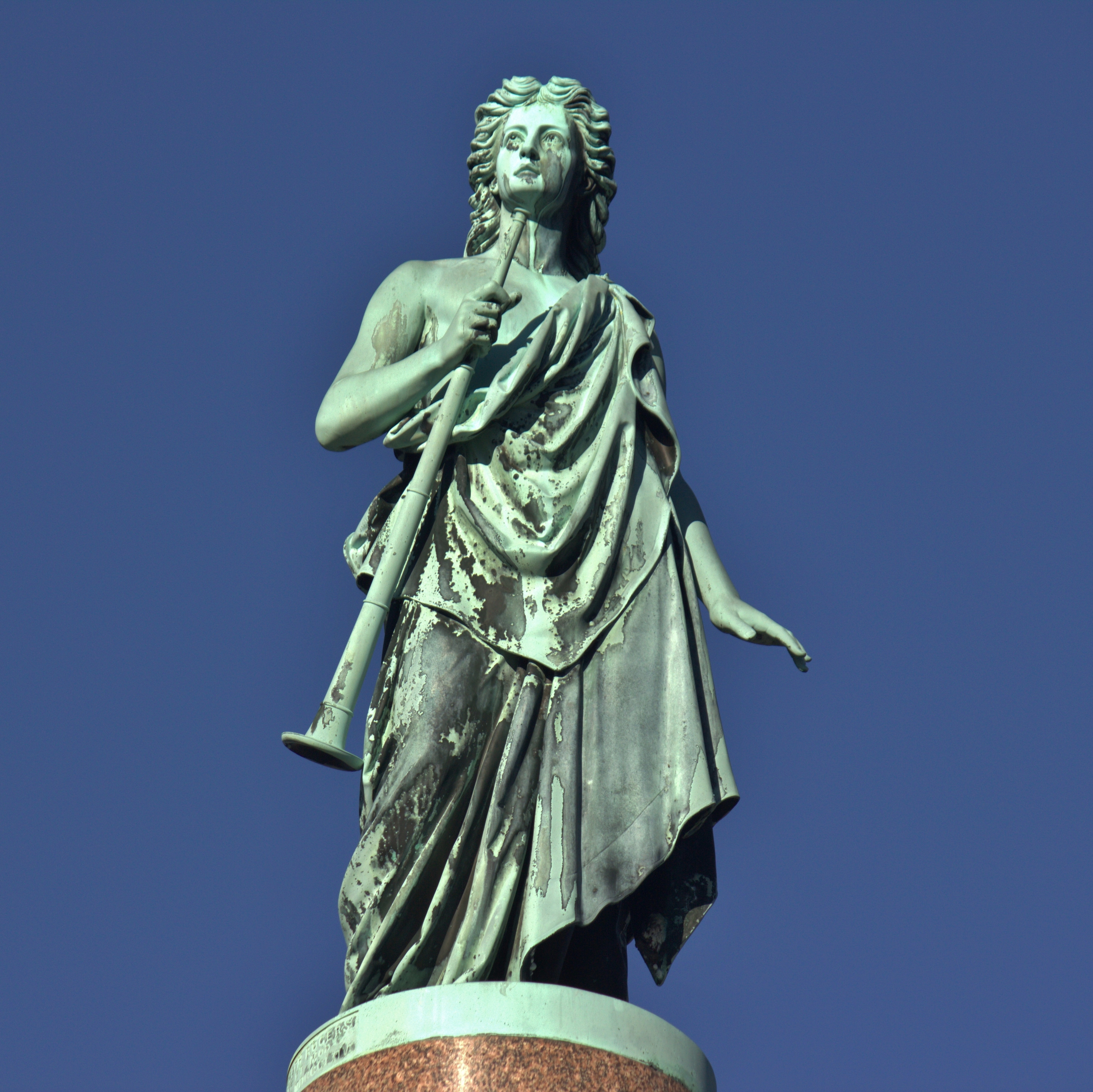
Angel of the Resurrection (1864) atop Colt Monument, Cedar Hill Cemetery, Hartford, Connecticut.

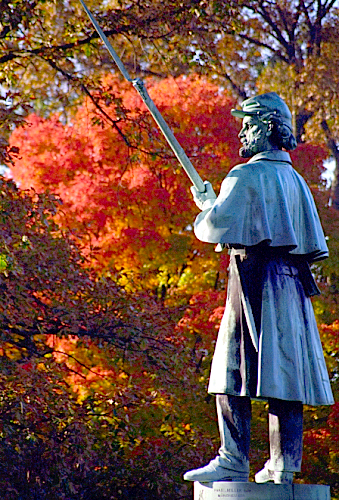
The Sentinel (1864–65), Spring Grove Cemetery, Cincinnati, Ohio.

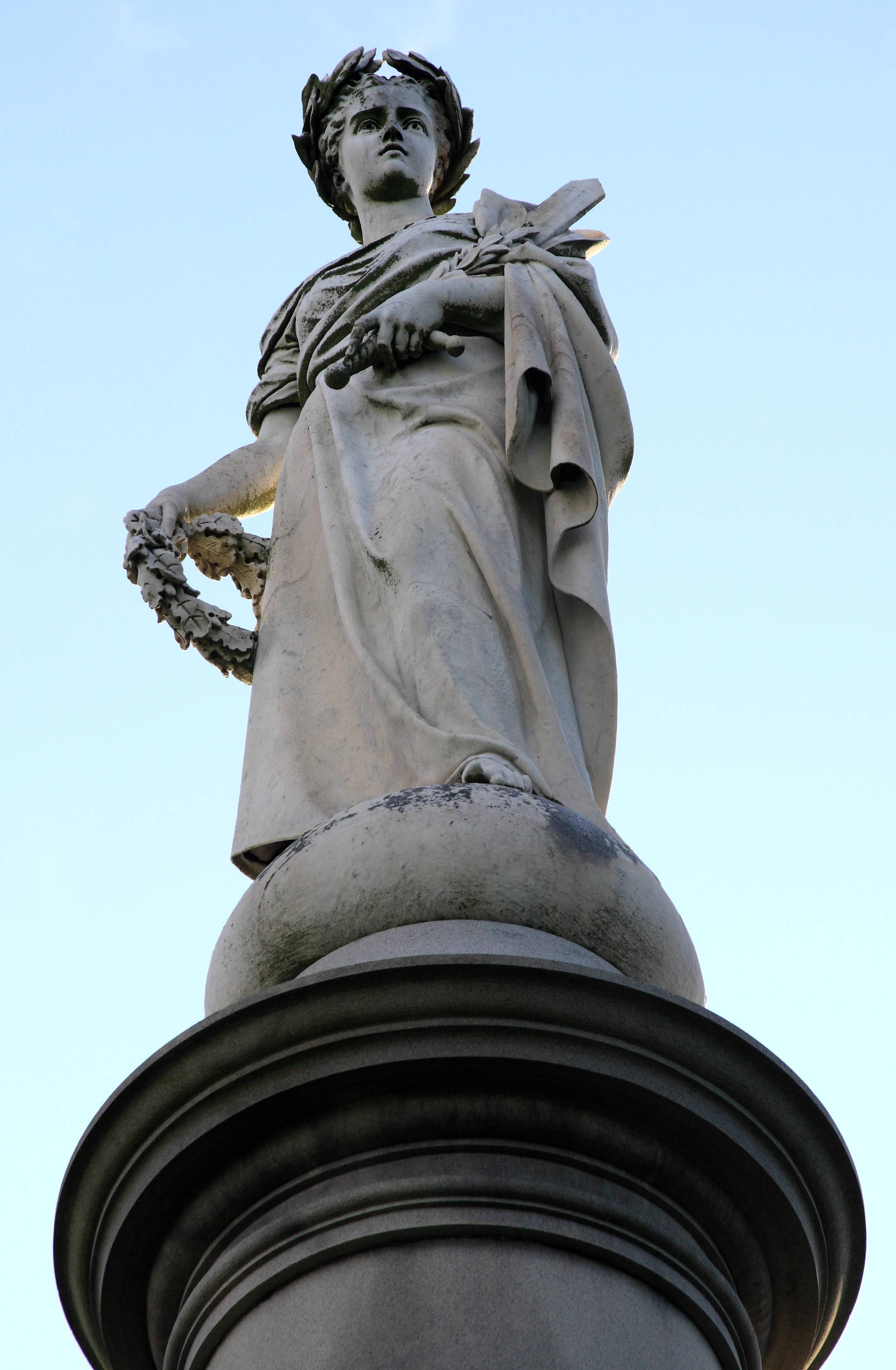
The Genius of Liberty, Soldiers' National Monument (1865–1869), Gettysburg National Cemetery, Gettysburg, Pennsylvania.

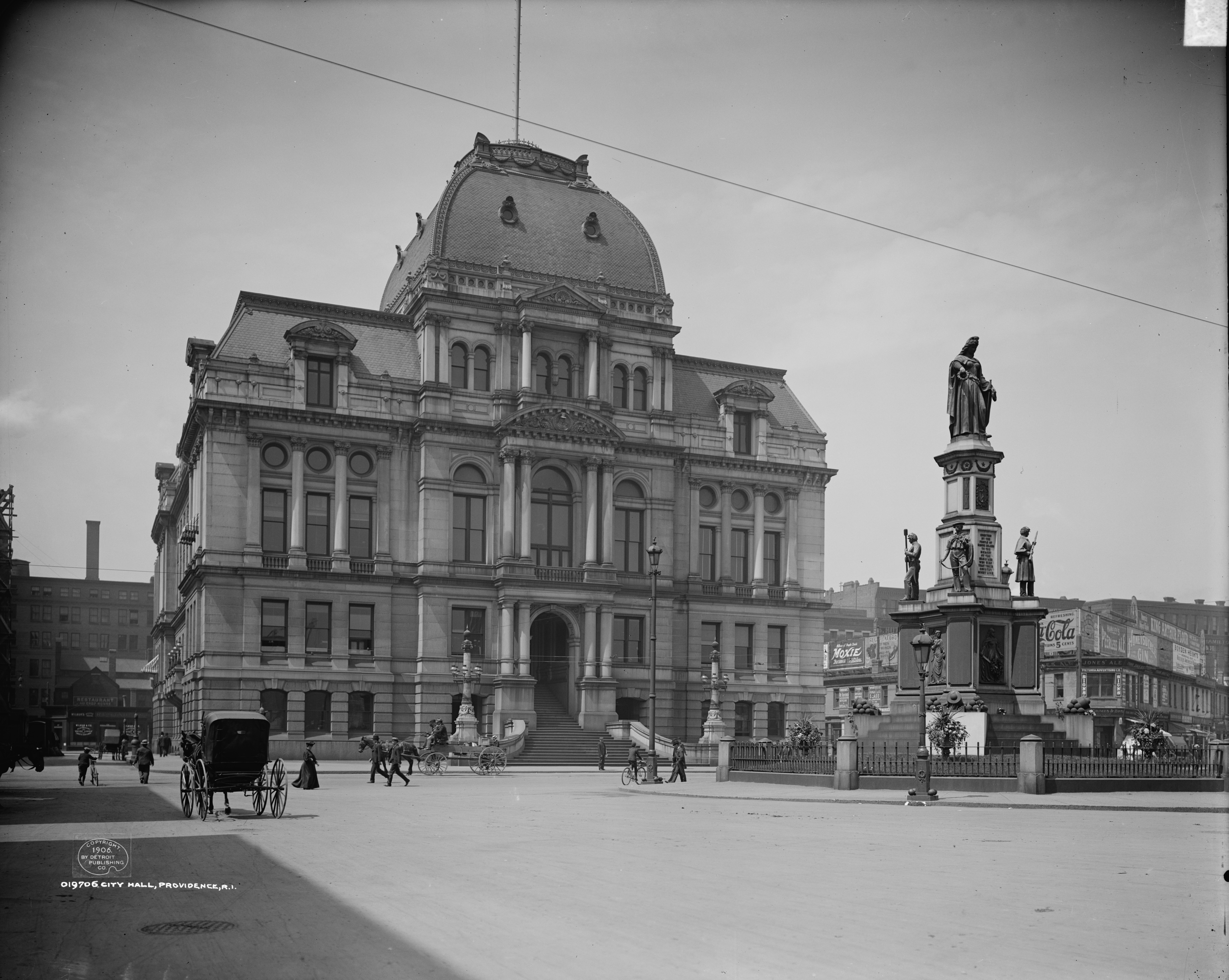
Rhode Island Soldiers' and Sailors' Monument (1866–1871), Kennedy Square, Providence, Rhode Island.

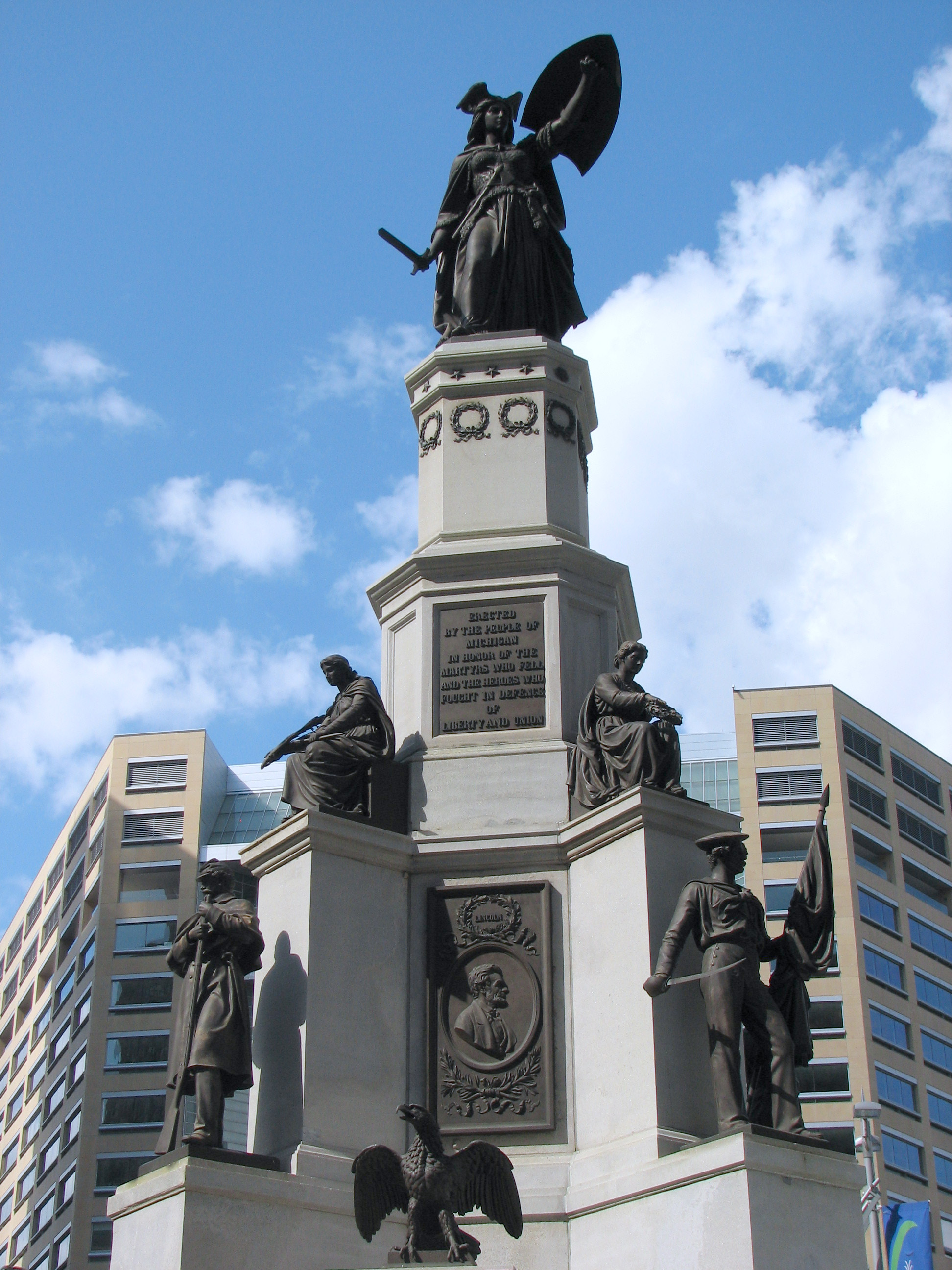
Michigan Soldiers' and Sailors' Monument (1867–1872), Detroit, Michigan.

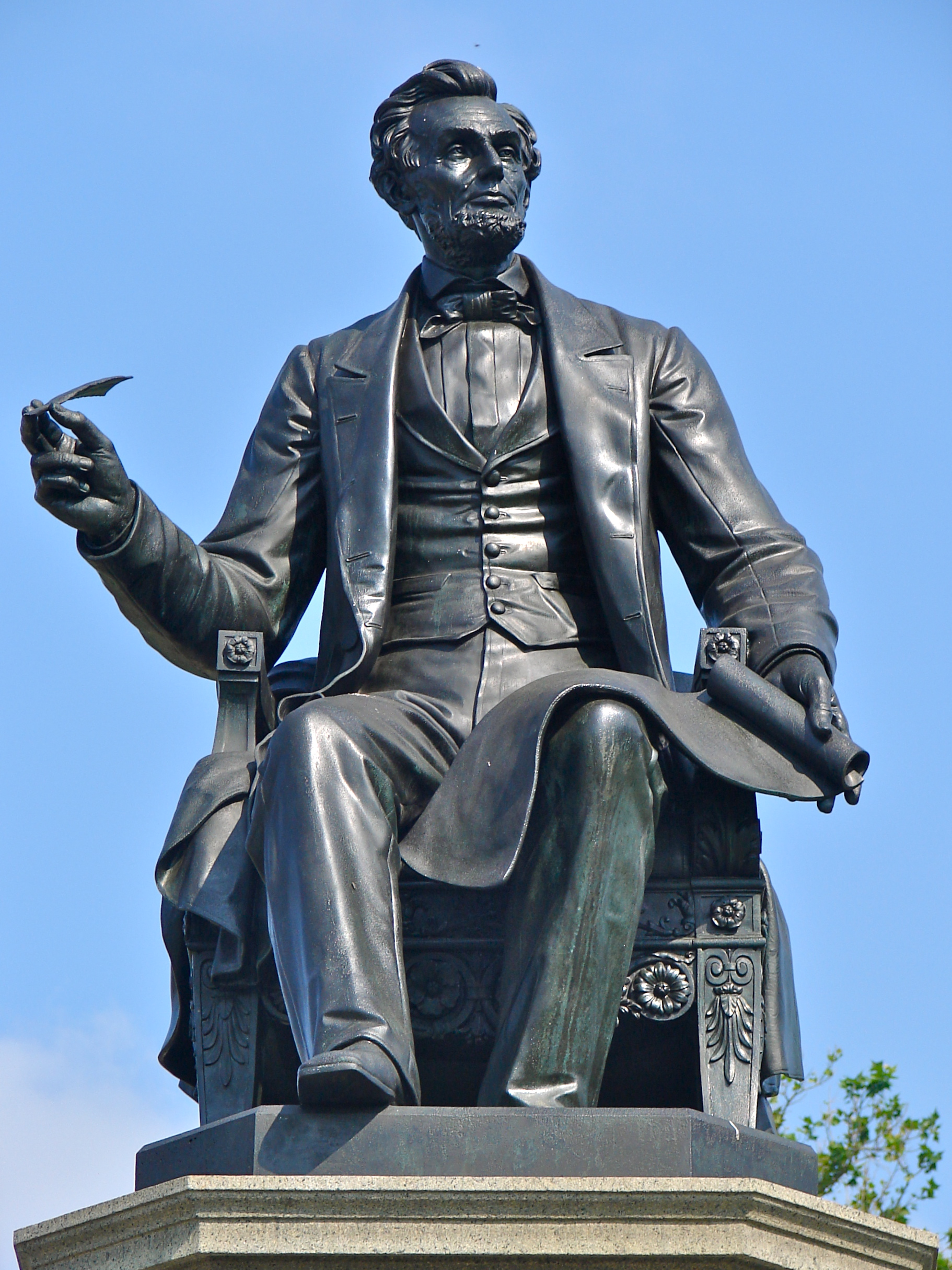
Abraham Lincoln (1870–71), East Fairmount Park, Philadelphia, Pennsylvania.

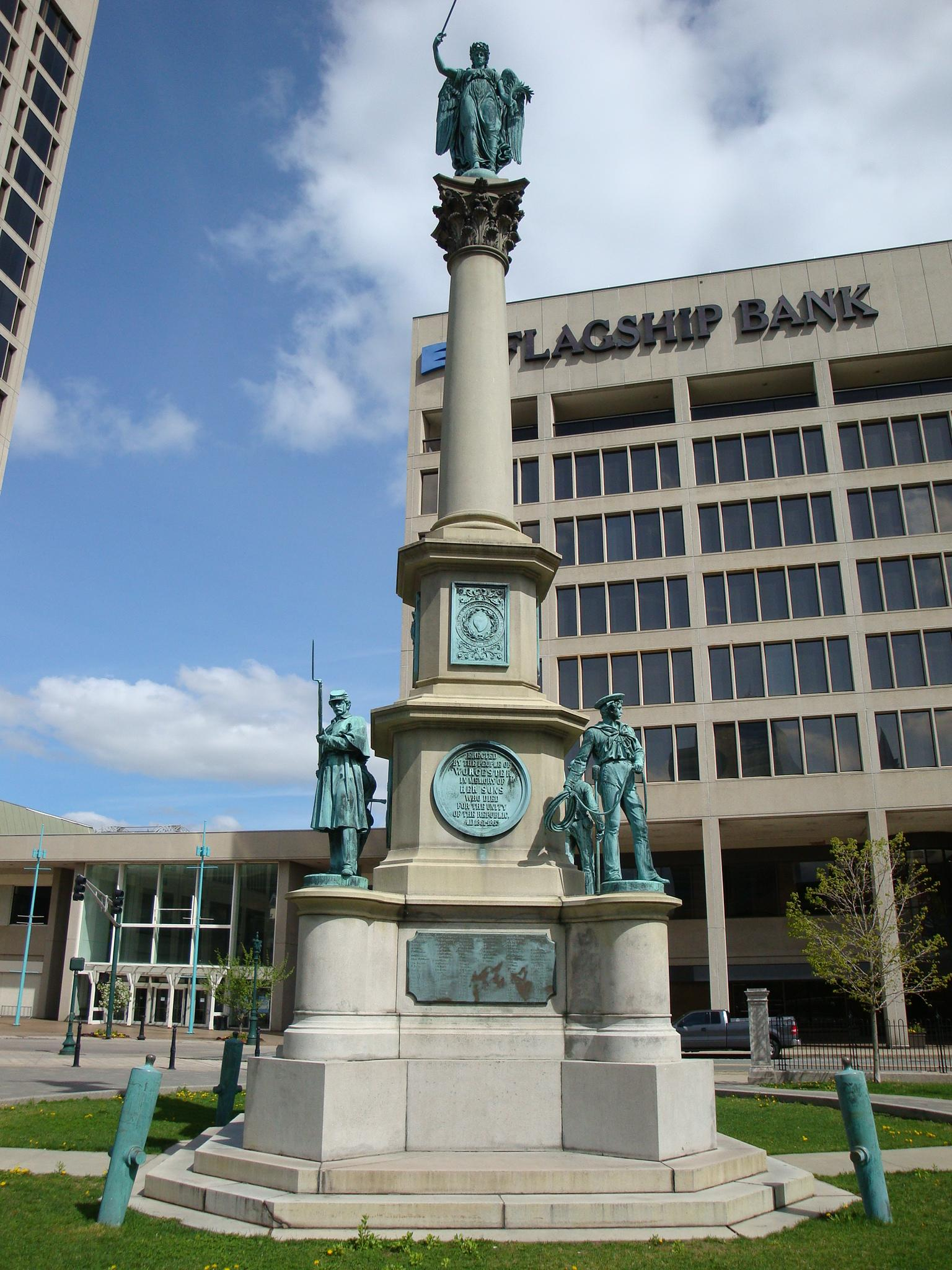
Soldiers' Monument (1871–1874), Worcester, Massachusetts.

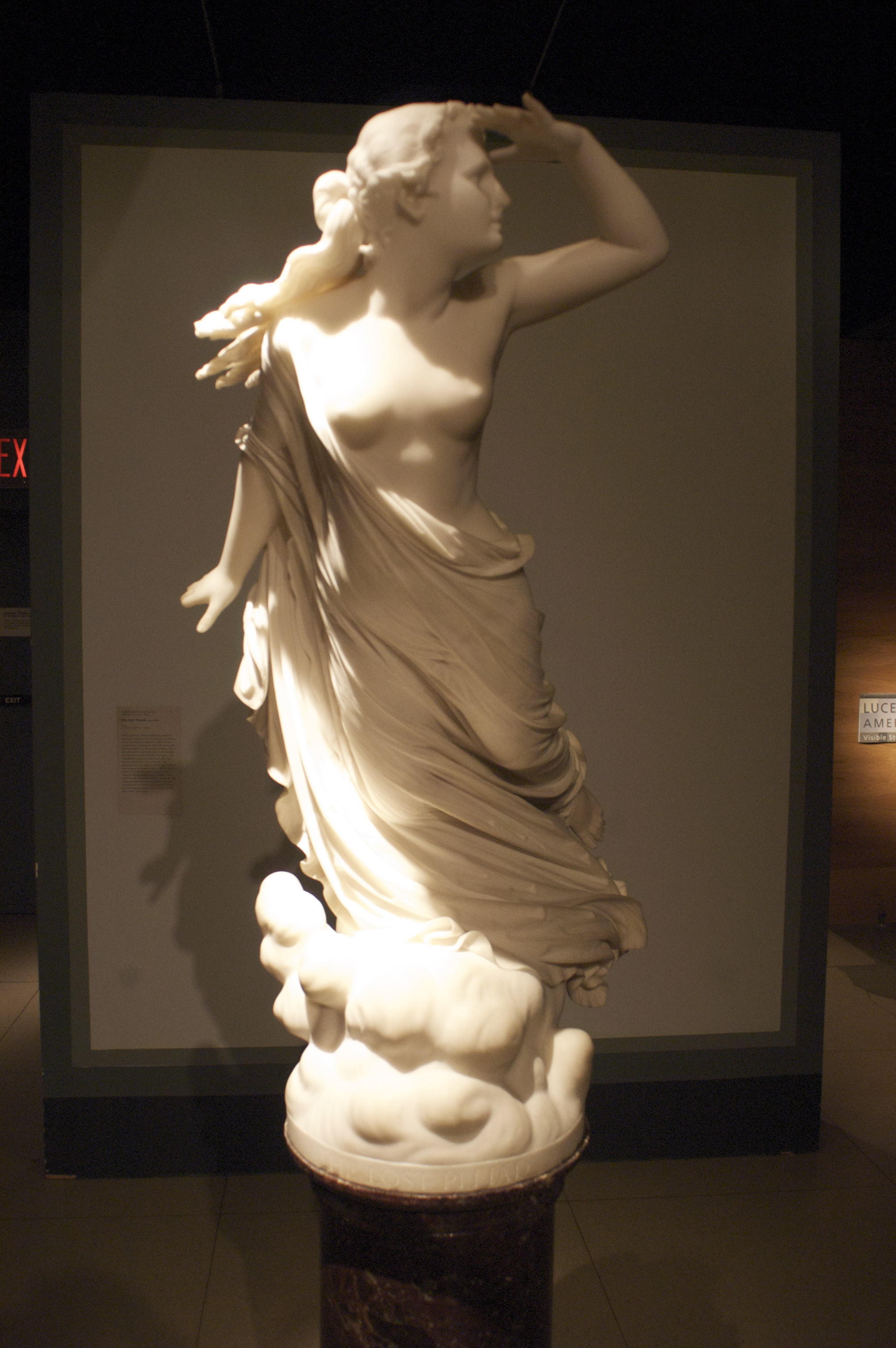
The Lost Pleiad (1873–74), Brooklyn Museum of Art, Brooklyn, New York City.

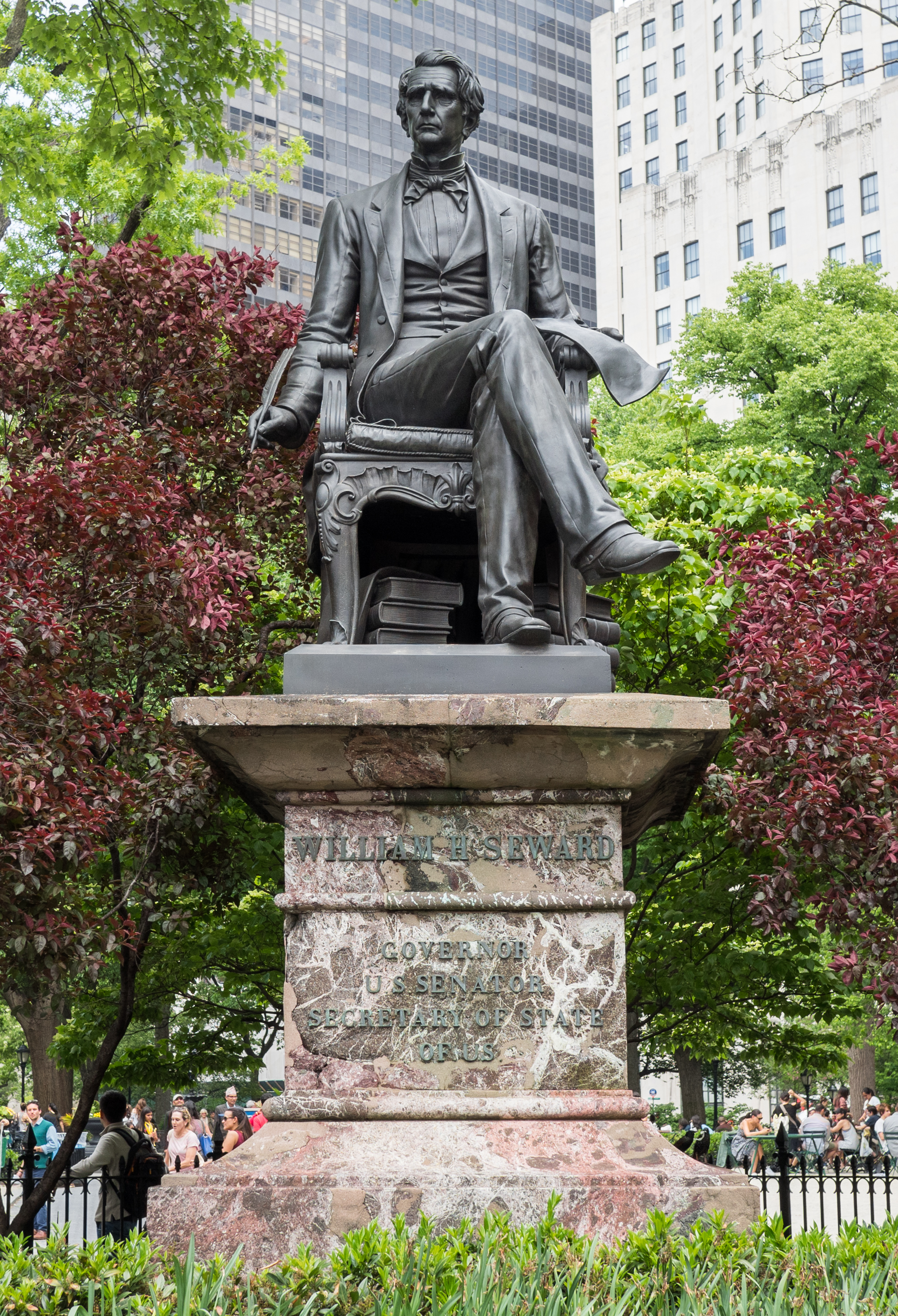
William H. Seward Monument (1875–76), Madison Square, New York City.

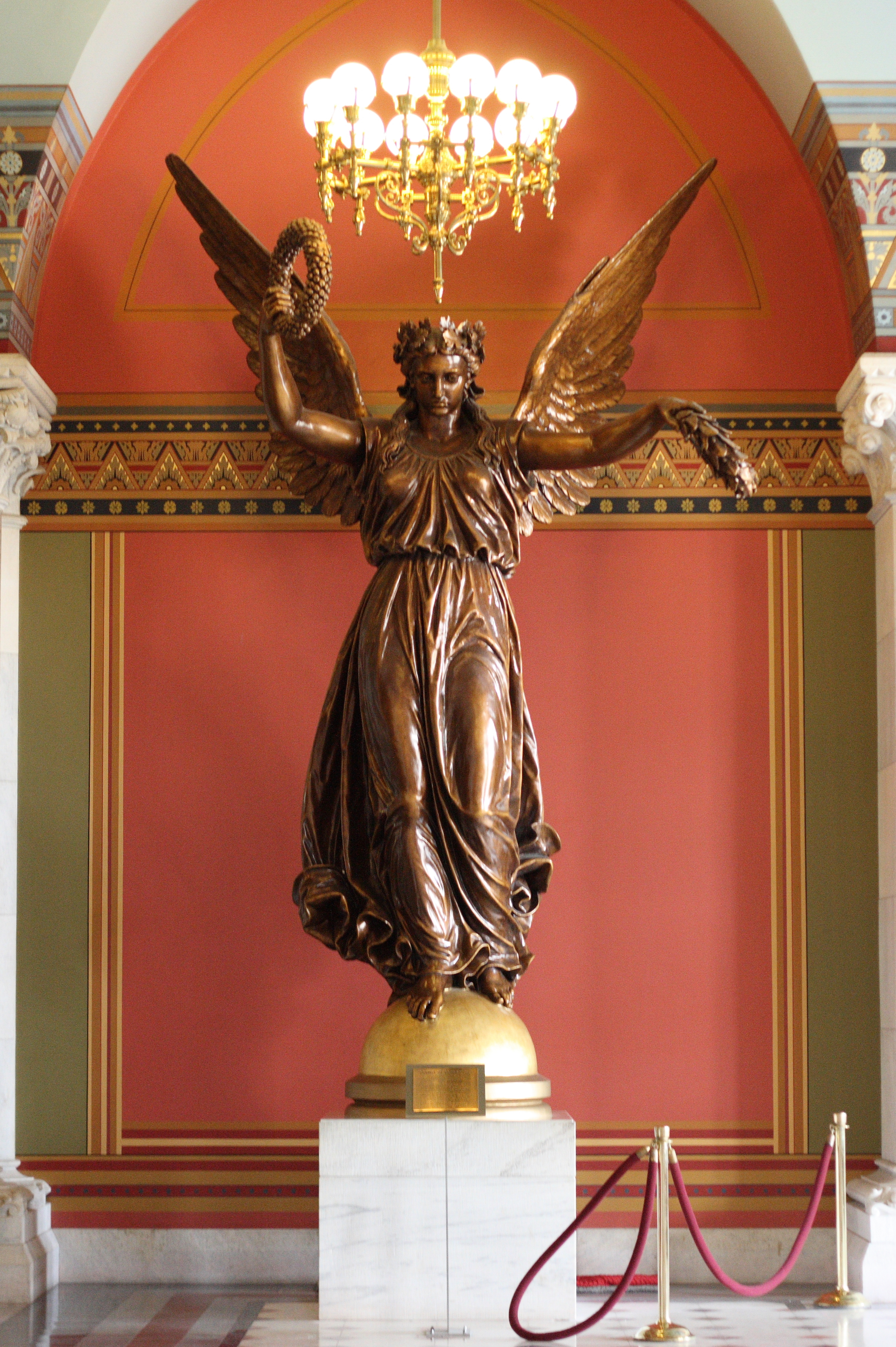
The Genius of Connecticut (1877–78), Connecticut State Capitol, Hartford, Connecticut. Painted plaster cast, the original bronze statue was damaged and destroyed.

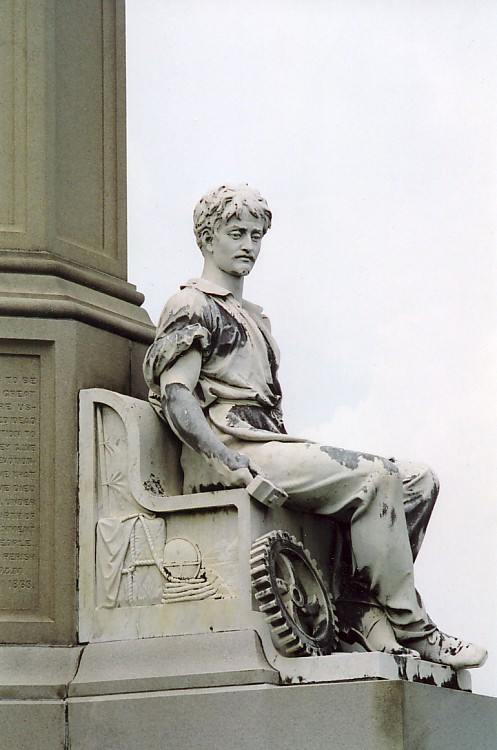
"Labor" from Soldiers' National Monument

== Notes ==
- "Randolph Rogers," Susan James-Gadzinski & Mary Mullen Cunningham, American Sculpture in the Museum of American Art of the Pennsylvania Academy of the Fine Arts (PAFA, 1997), pp. 58–61.
- Millard F. Rogers, Jr. Randolph Rogers: American Sculptor in Rome. University of Massachusetts Press. 1971. ISBN 9780870230875.
- Marc Tarrozzi, Randolph Rogers and the Rhode Island Soldiers' and Sailors' Monument (1989).
- William H. Seward was Secretary of State, 1861–1869.
