= Columbus Doors =

Pair of bronze doors at the United States Capitol Building

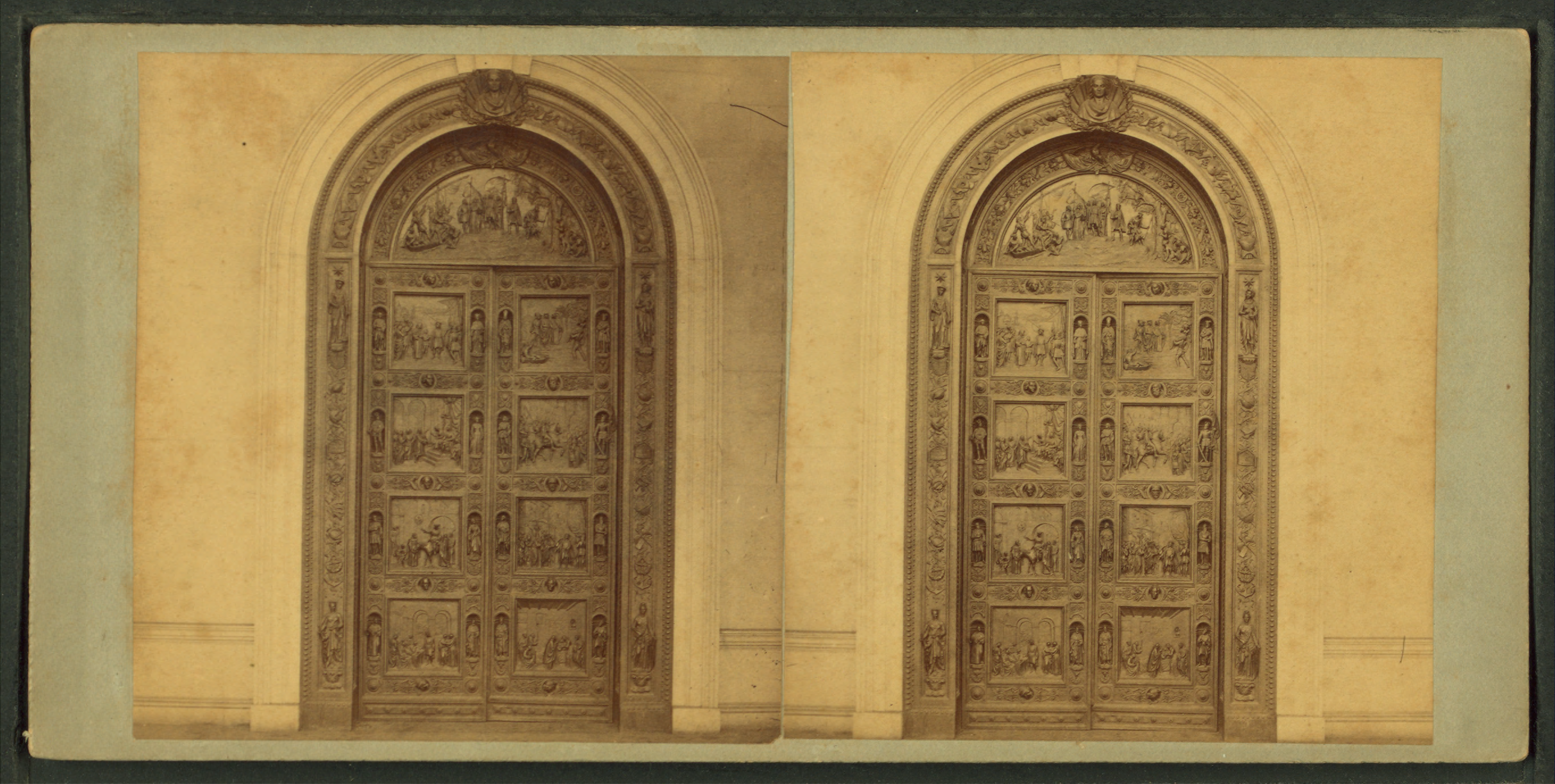
- Artist: Randolph Rogers
- Year: 1855–1861
- Type: Bronze
- Dimensions: 510 cm × 300 cm (200 in × 117 in)
- Location: United States Capitol Washington, D.C., United States

The Columbus Doors (1855–1861), also known as the Rogers Doors, are a pair of monumental bronze doors designed by sculptor Randolph Rogers and cast by Ferdinand von Miller for the East Front of the United States Capitol in Washington, DC. Leading into the Rotunda, they feature detailed reliefs depicting key events from the life of Christopher Columbus.

== History ==
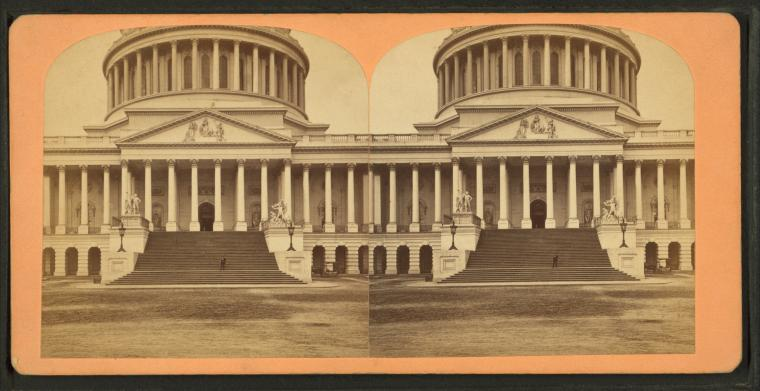
East Front of the U.S. Capitol showing Rogers's Columbus Doors (center, at top of stairs), after 1871 installation.

Rogers, an expatriate American artist trained and living in Italy, was a Neoclassical sculptor noted for his carved works in marble. He visited the United States in 1855, and was awarded the commission for the doors. He had never done anything on this scale, and was not known for working in bronze.

Rogers's sculptural theme was Scenes from the Life of Columbus. Each door has four panels illustrating significant events, and the semi-circular transom above the pair illustrates Columbus landing in the New World. The border surrounding the doors and transom is adorned with statuettes of figures who participated in the Columbus story and nautical items such as anchors and rudders. Figures around the outer rim represent Asia, Africa, Europe and America.

Between 1856 and 1858, Rogers modeled the doors first in clay, then in plaster. They were cast in bronze by the German artisan Ferdinand von Miller, at the Royal Bavarian Foundry in Munich, Germany, from 1860 to 1861. Ferdinand von Miller was a renowned bronze caster known for his work on large-scale public monuments, including the Bavaria statue in Munich.

Because of delays in transportation related to the American Civil War, they did not arrive in the United States until 1863. They were installed on the East Front in 1871.

With transom, the doors are 16 ft 8 in tall, and 9 ft 9 in wide. They weigh approximately 20,000 pounds (10 tons).

They were most recently treated in 2021.

In January 2021, the doors were damaged during the United States Capitol attack.

== East Front extension ==
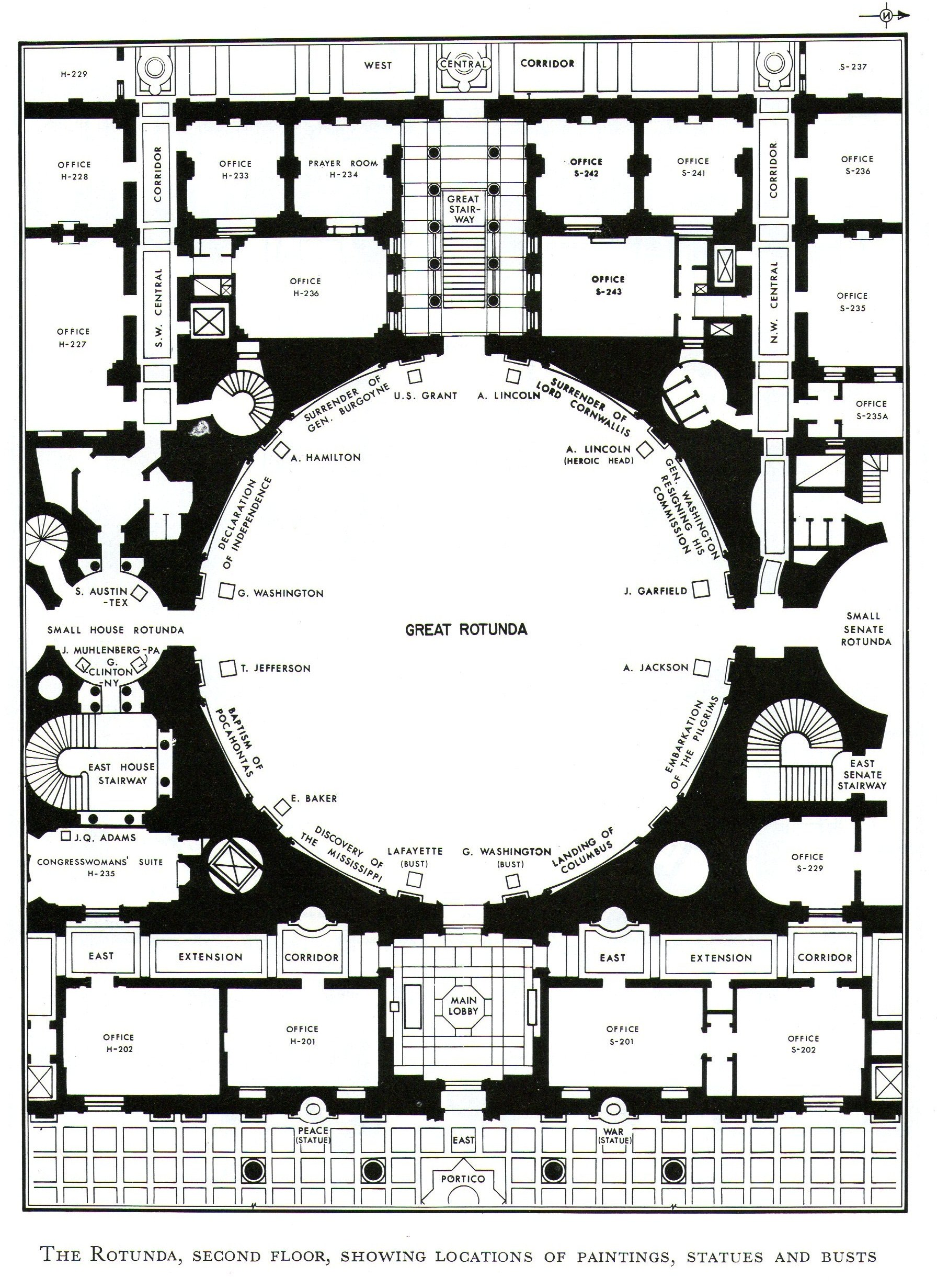
Plan showing the Rotunda. The 1958–1962 East Front Extension created the Main Lobby, East Extension Corridor and offices shown at bottom.

The Capitol's East Front was extended between 1958 and 1962. A new exterior wall was built 32.5 feet east of the old exterior wall, and the space between them became the Main Lobby, offices and the East Extension Corridor. The Columbus Doors were moved from their original location to their present location, within the new exterior wall, in 1961 following the extension of the East Front of the Capitol.

== Panels ==
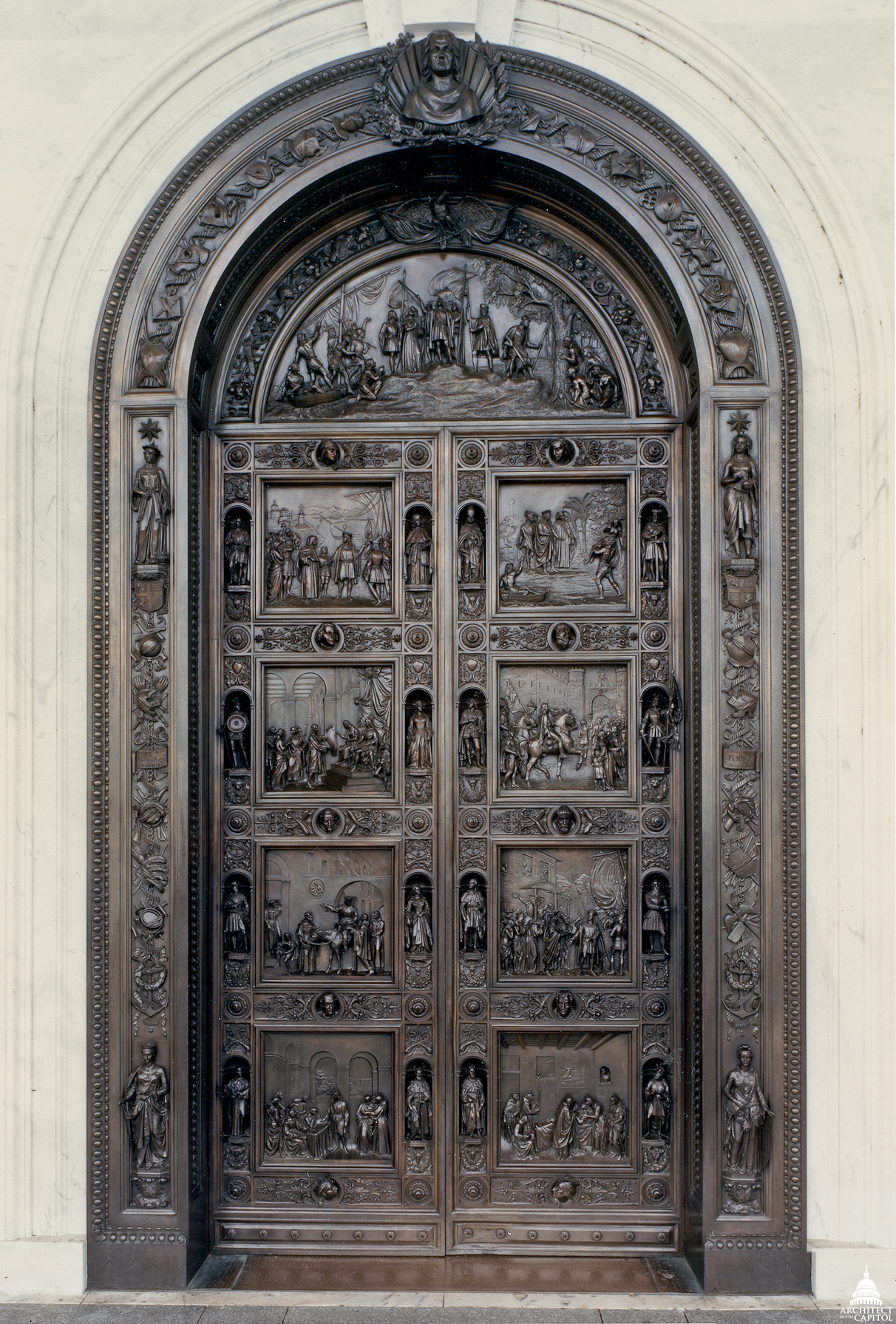
Columbus door

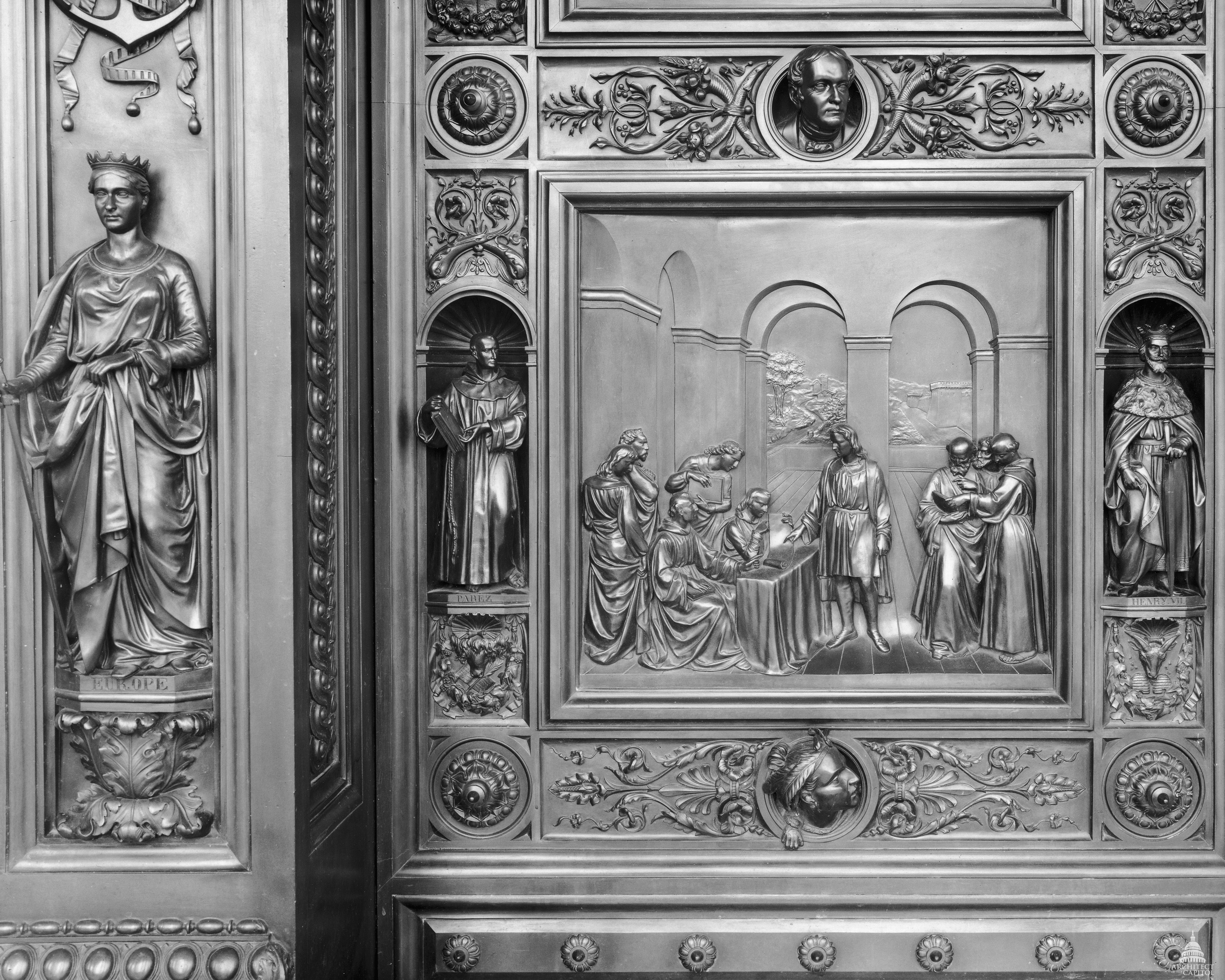
Left door: Columbus before the Council at Salamanca (1487)

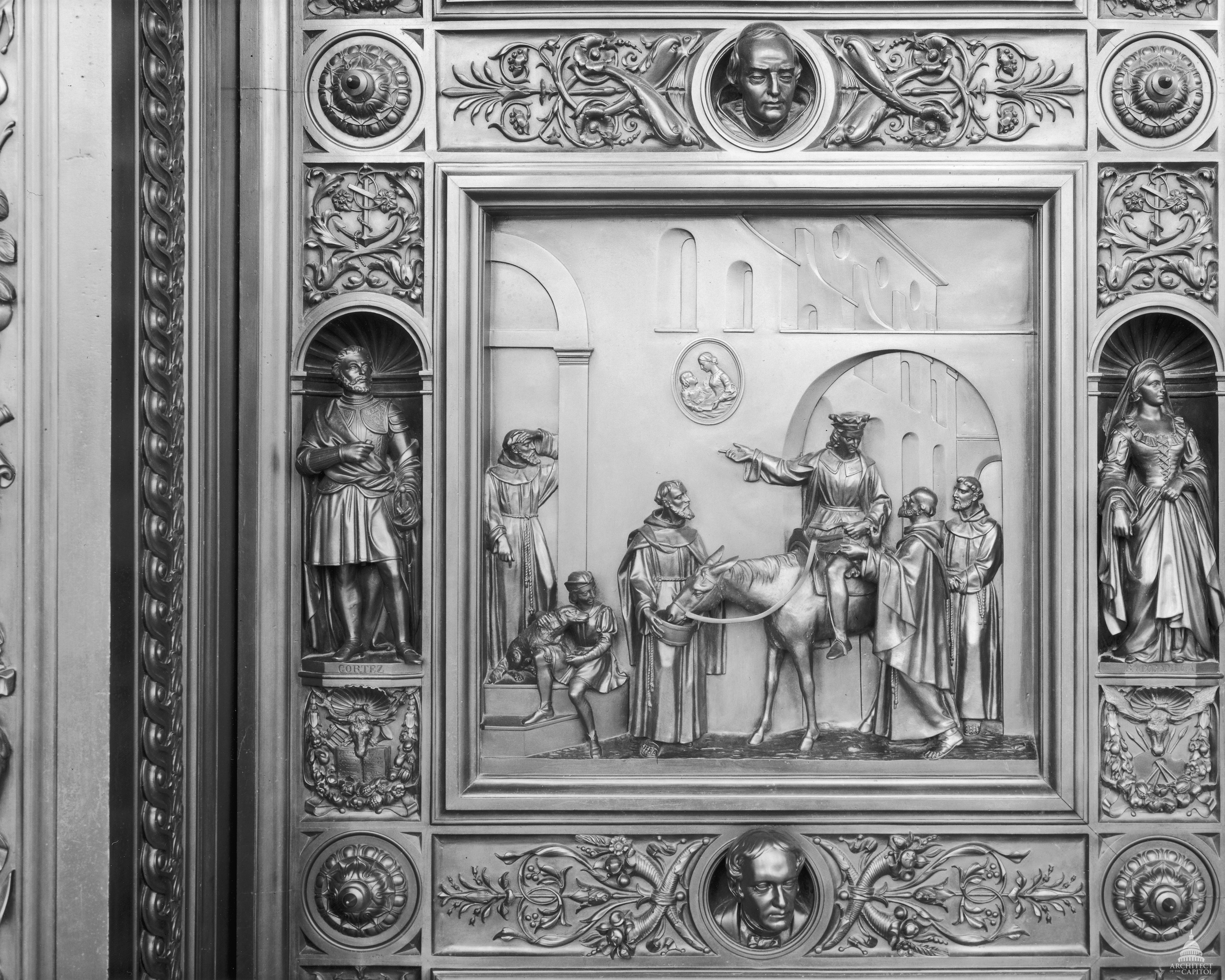
Columbus Leaves La Rabida for the Spanish Court (1492)

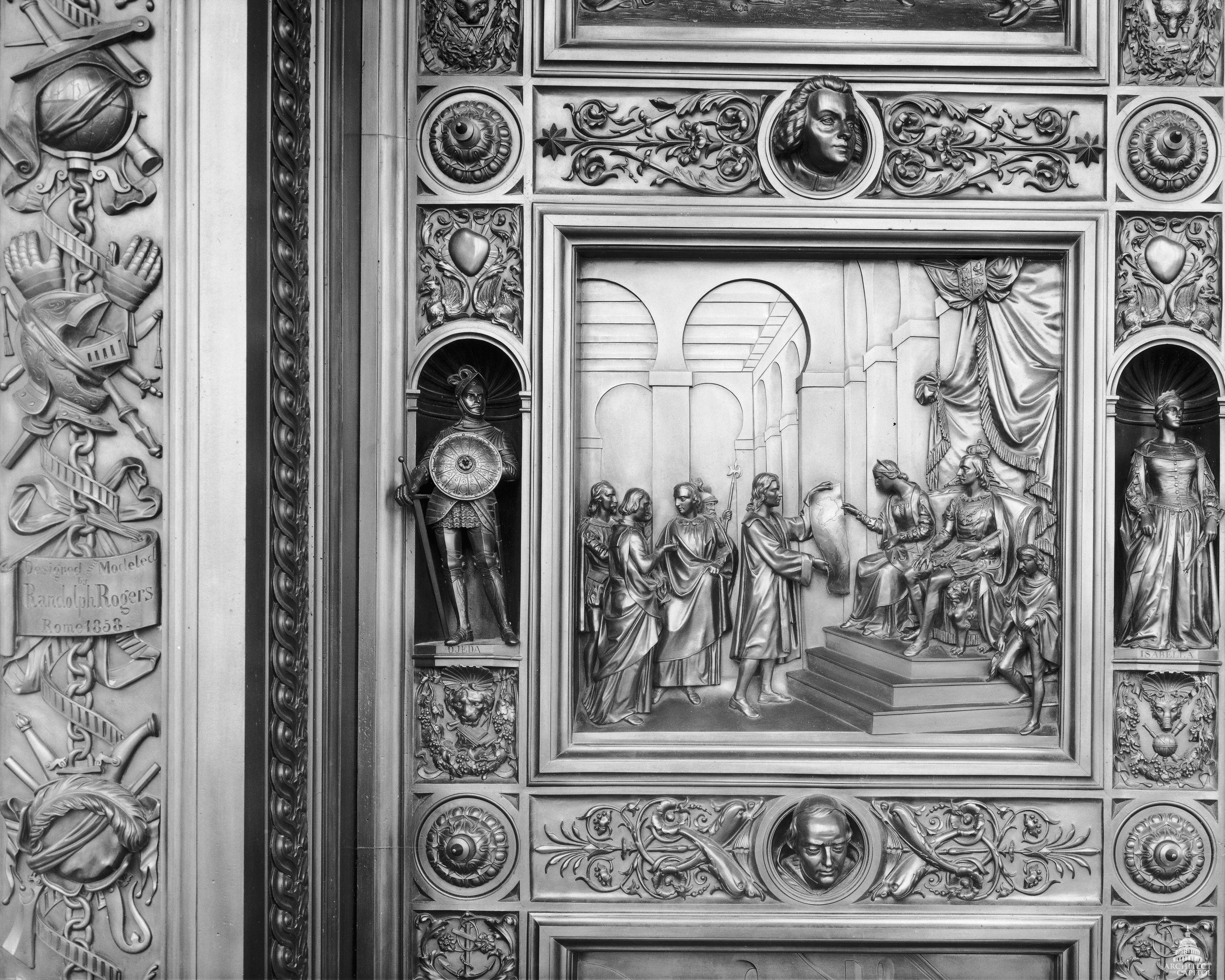
Columbus at the Court of Ferdinand and Isabella (1492)

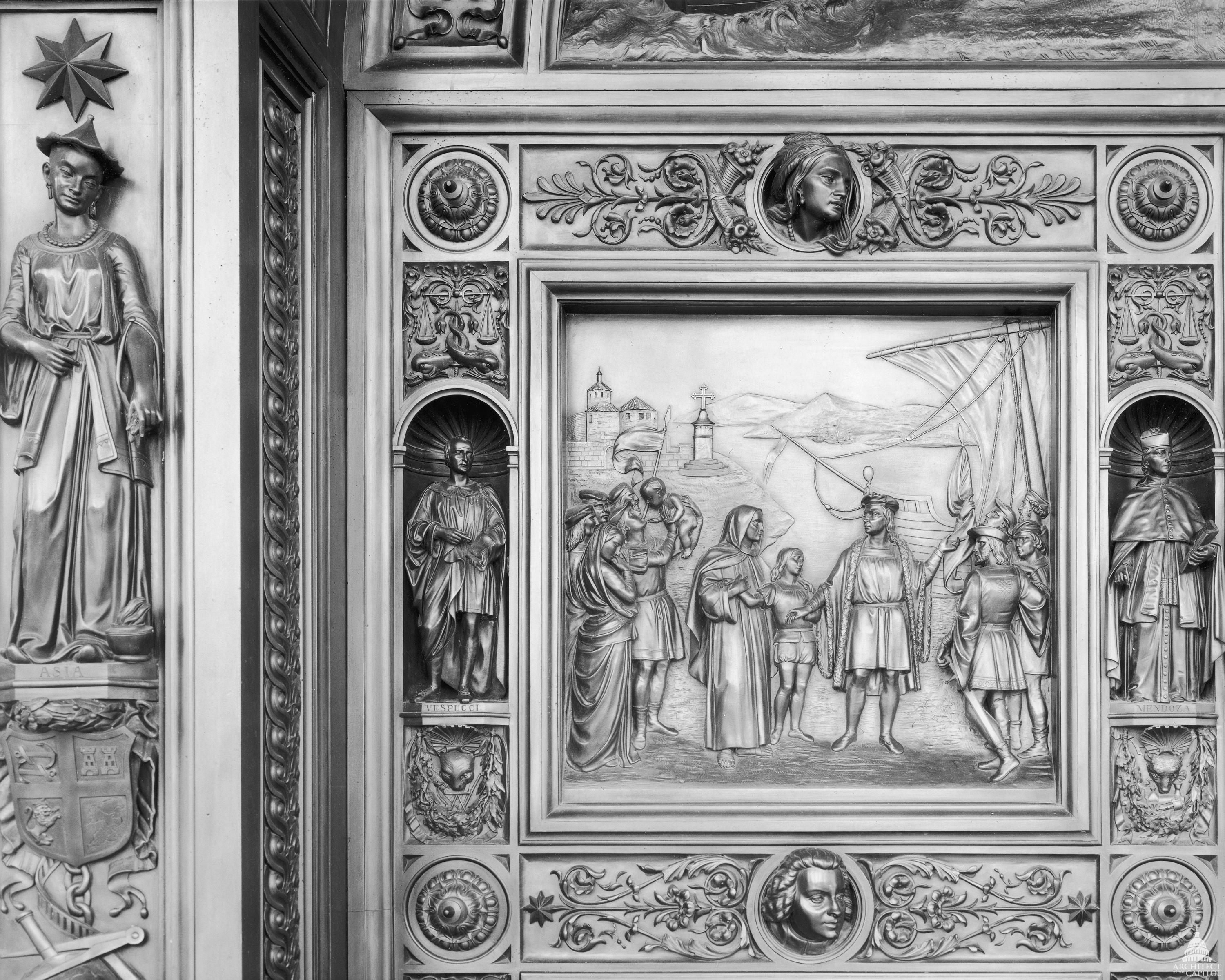
Columbus Starts from Palos (1492)

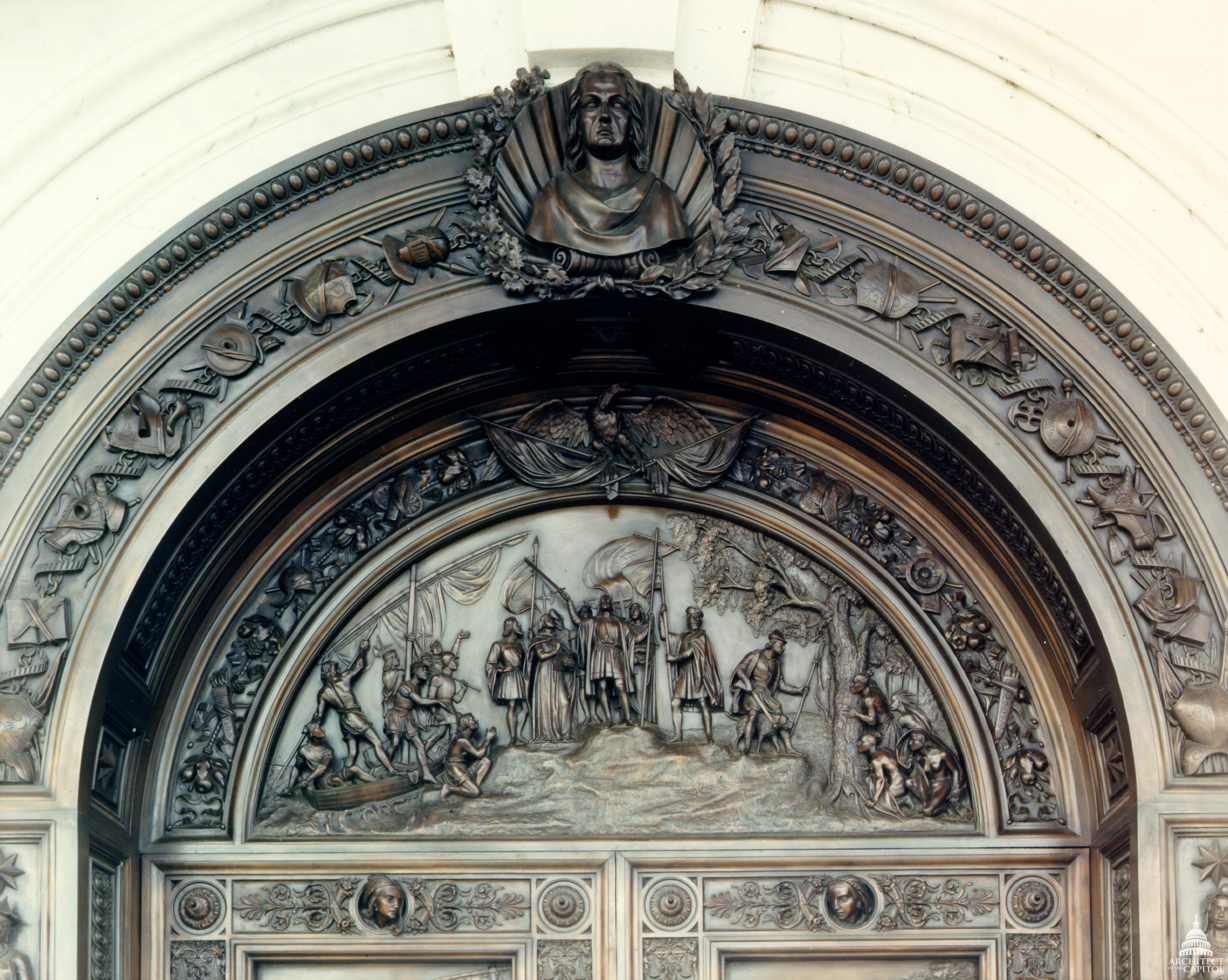
Transom: Landing of Columbus in the New World (1492)

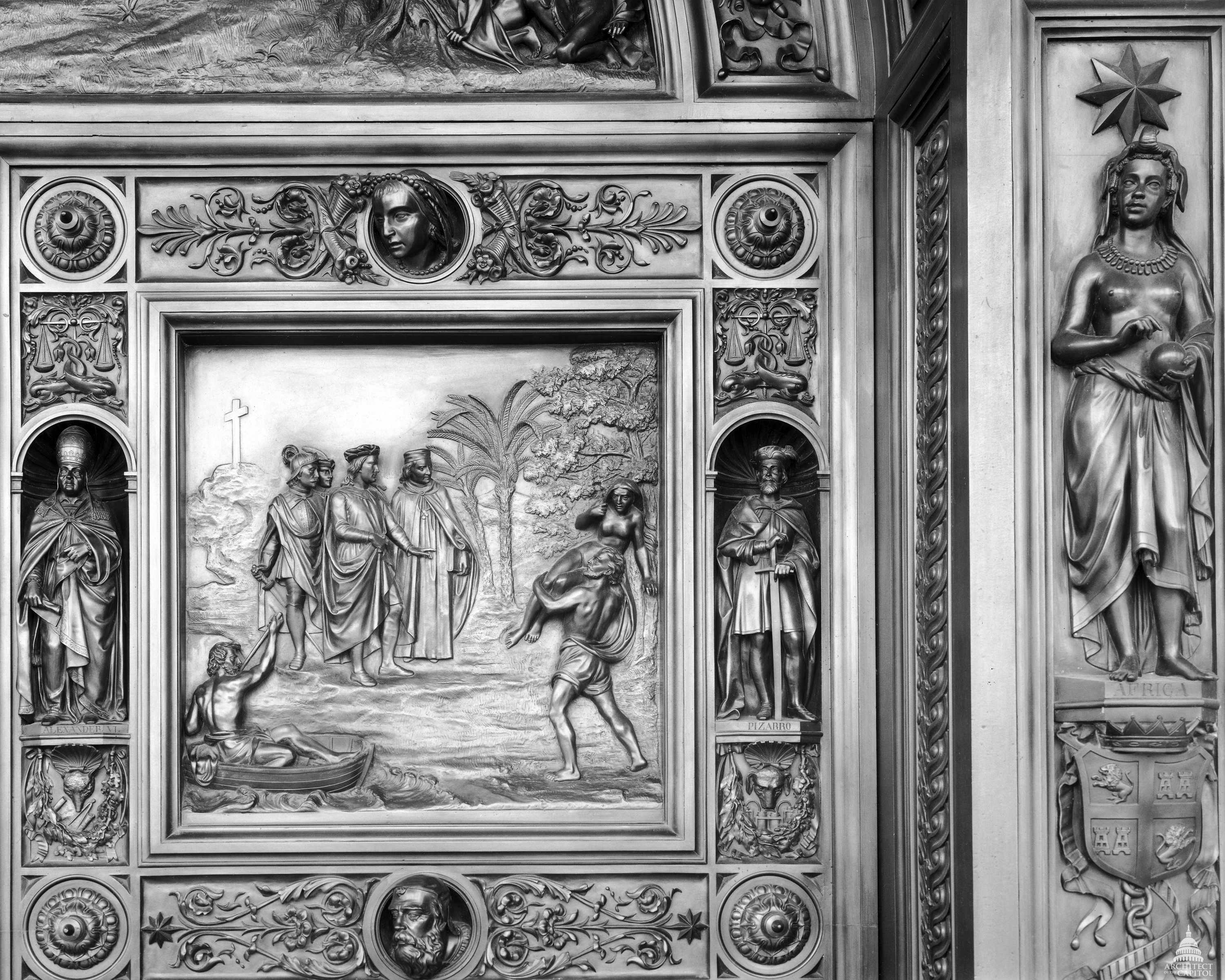
Right door: Columbus's First Encounter with the Indians (1492)

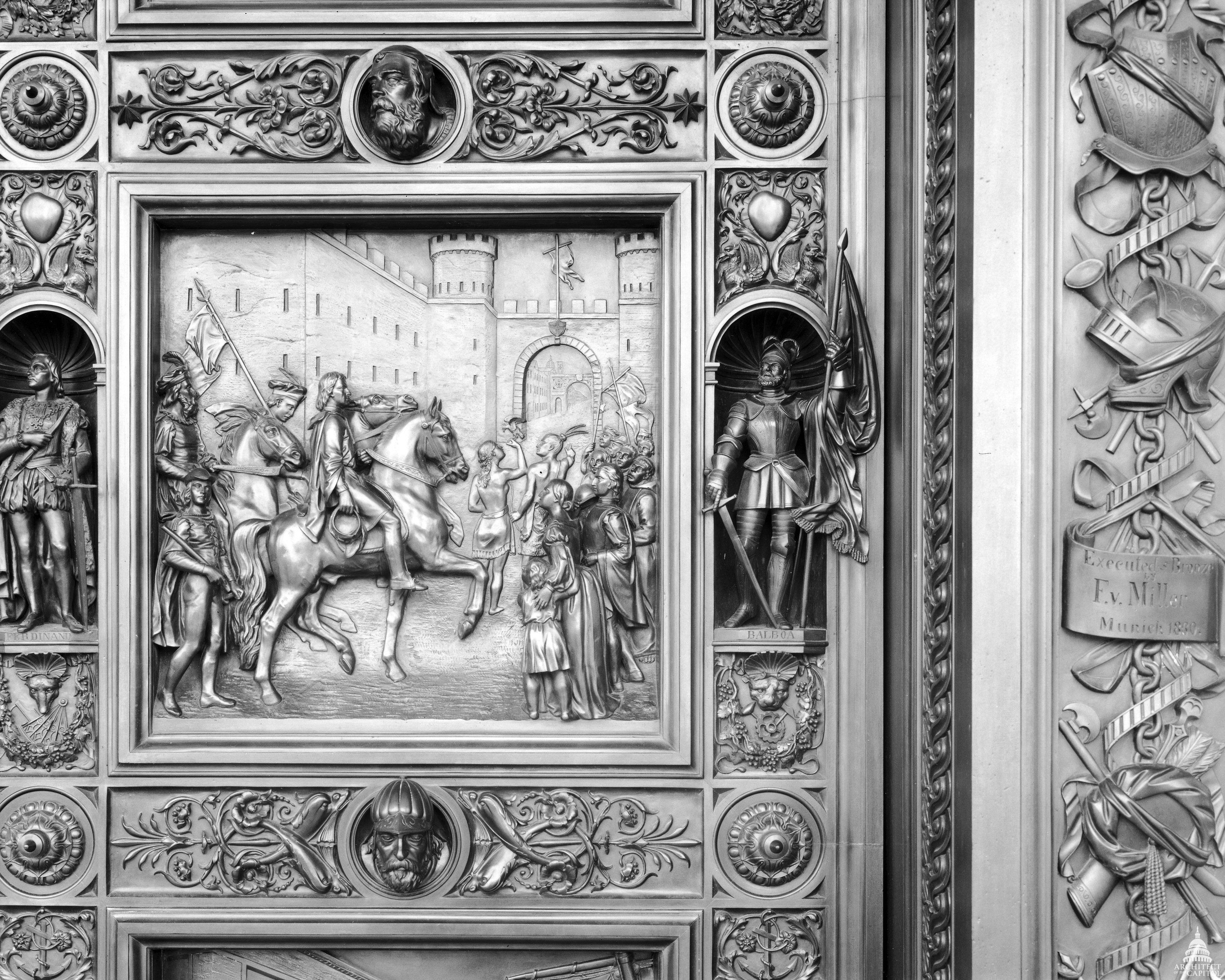
Triumphal Entry of Columbus into Barcelona (1493)

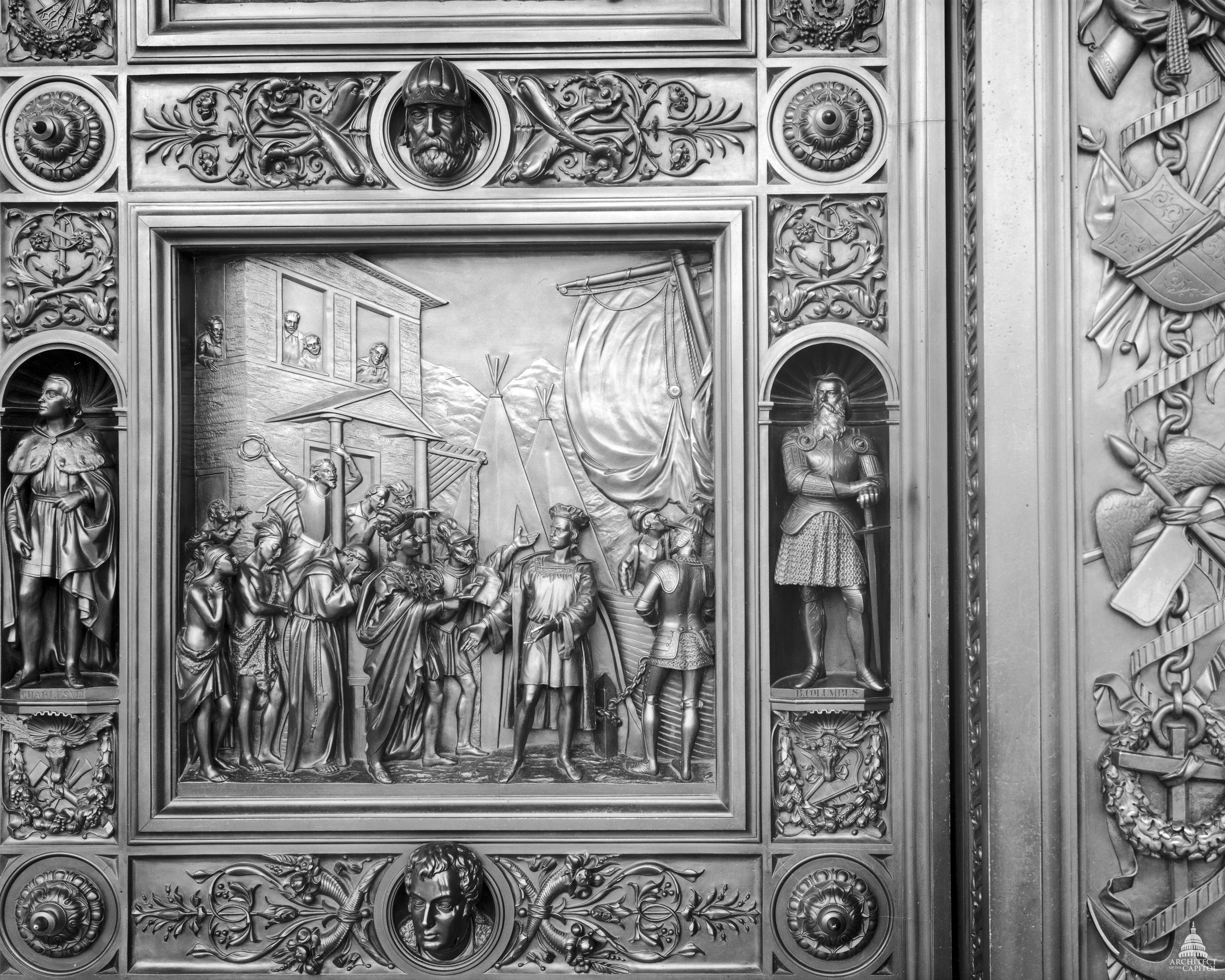
Columbus in Chains (1500)

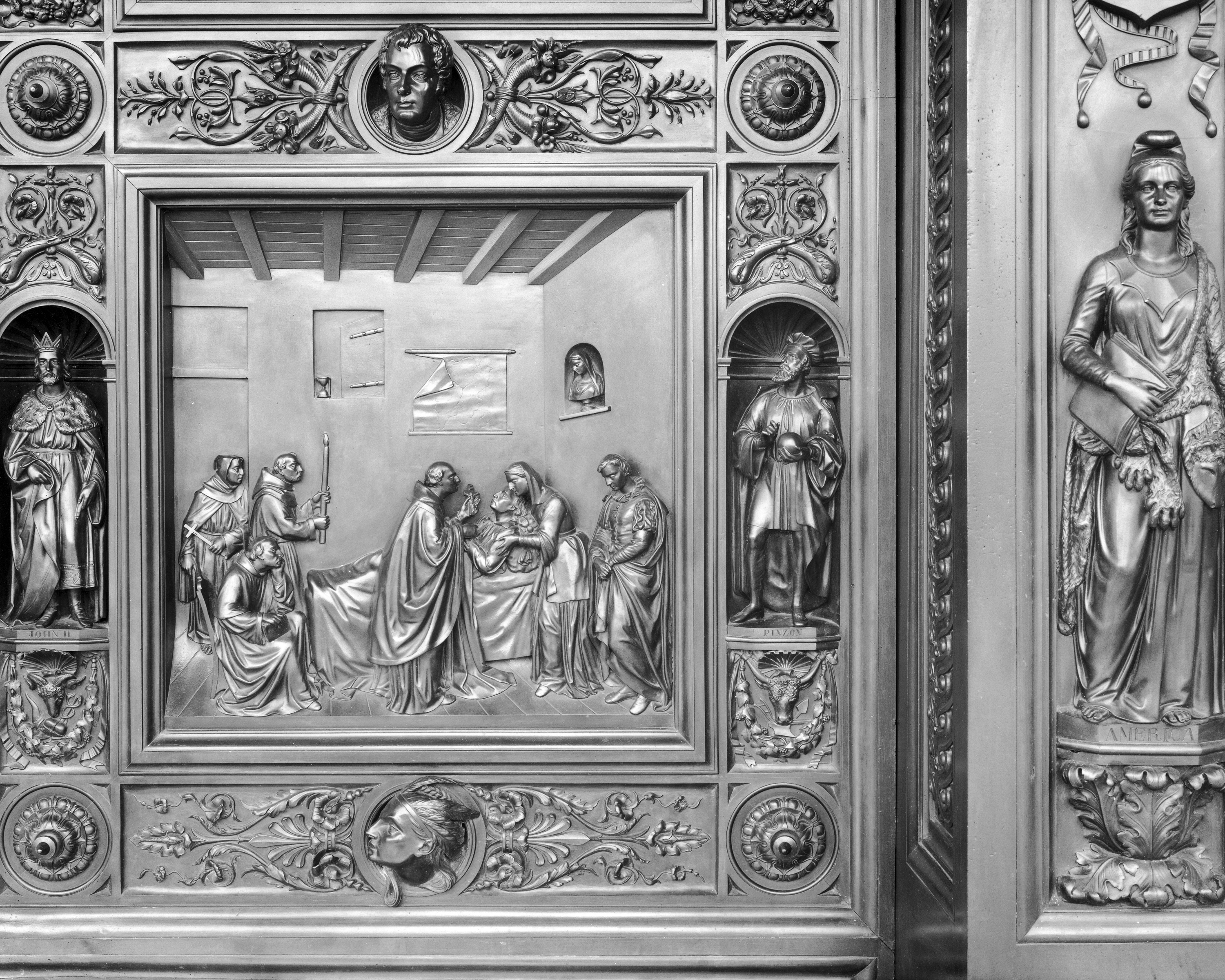
Deathbed of Columbus (1506)

== See also ==
- List of public art in Washington, D.C., Ward 6

== Notes ==
- Architect of the Capitol, Compilation of Works of Art and Other Objects in the United States Capitol (1965).
- Architect of the Capitol, Art in the United States Capitol (Washington, DC: Smithsonian Institution Press, 1974).
