= Soldiers' Monument (Worcester, Massachusetts) =

- City of Worcester Parks, Recreation, and Cemetery Department
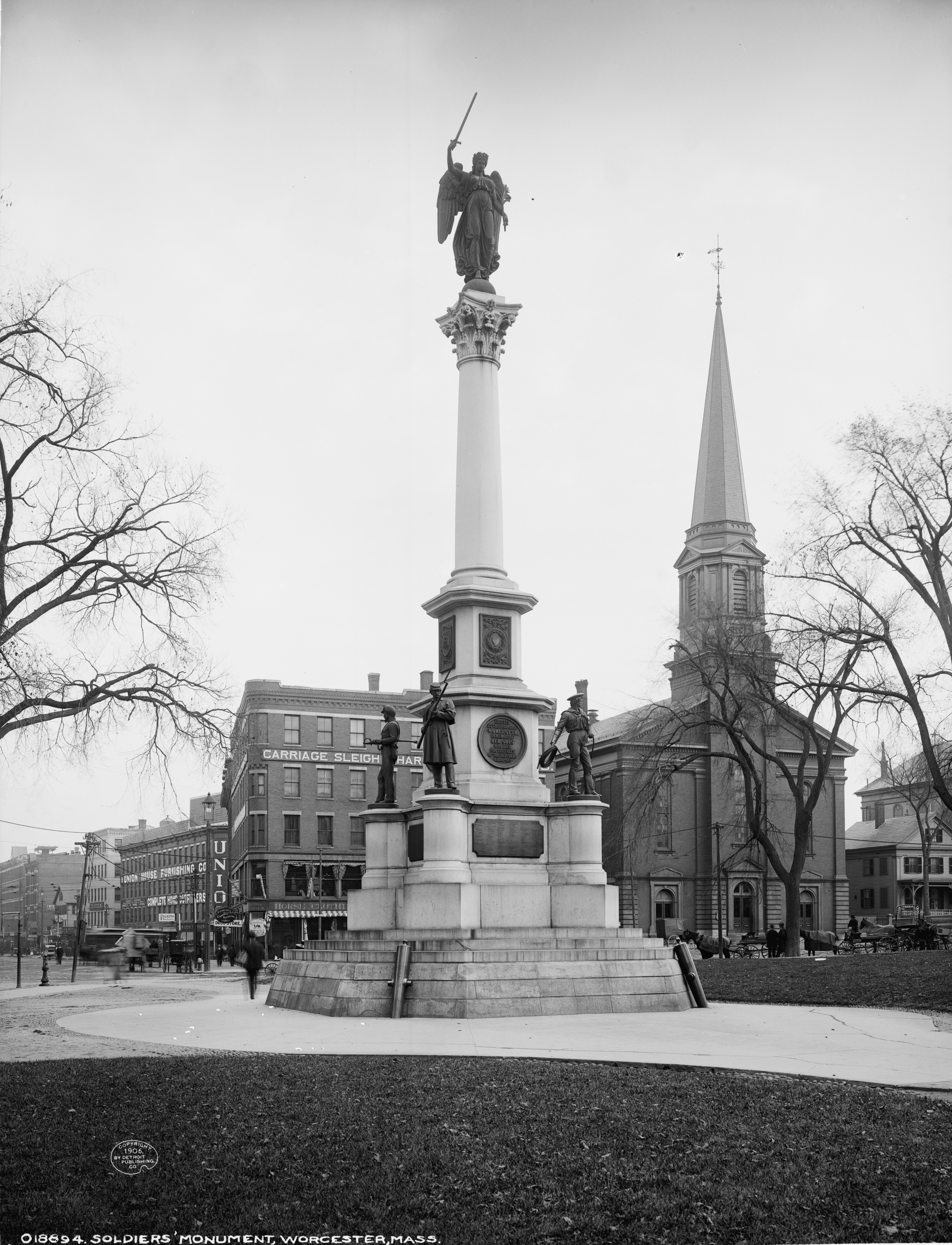
- Soldiers' Monument, circa 1910. Note the rough-granite base (now buried).
- For the Sons of Worcester who died in the Civil War.
- Unveiled: July 15, 1874
- Location: 42.262224°N 71.8°W near Worcester City Hall and Common; Worcester, Massachusetts
- Designed by: Randolph Rogers, sculptor.

Soldiers' Monument (Worcester, Massachusetts) is an American Civil War monument on Worcester Common in Worcester, Massachusetts.

Designed by sculptor Randolph Rogers, it consists of a tapering granite Corinthian column crowned by a bronze goddess of Victory, a three-tiered granite pedestal adorned with bronze plaques, buttresses surmounted by four bronze statues representing branches of the military – Artillery, Cavalry, Infantry, Navy – with the whole resting upon a rough granite base flanked by four buried cannons barrels.

The pedestal's top tier is adorned with four relief plaques: the City of Worcester seal, the Massachusetts state seal, the United States seal, and a pair of crossed swords encircled by a laurel wreath. The middle tier features relief busts of U.S. President Abraham Lincoln and Massachusetts Governor John A. Andrew, a battle scene of a dying soldier supported by a comrade, and the monument's dedication plaque. The bottom tier features four inscription plaques listing the names of the 398 Worcester soldiers who died in the war.

In 1871, the Soldiers' Monument Committee commissioned Rogers to design the memorial. The City of Worcester appropriated $35,000, and an addition $15,000 was raised by subscription. The monument was dedicated on July 15, 1874.

When built, the monument was approximately 66 ft 0 in (20.12 m) tall, and the base was approximately 24 ft 0 in (7.32 m) square. The ground level was raised in 1969, burying the rough-granite base, so the monument is now approximately 4 ft 0 in (1.22 m) shorter.

Dedication Plaque:

ERECTED
BY THE PEOPLE OF
WORCESTER
IN MEMORY OF
HER SONS
WHO DIED
FOR THE UNITY
OF THE REPUBLIC
AD 1861-1865

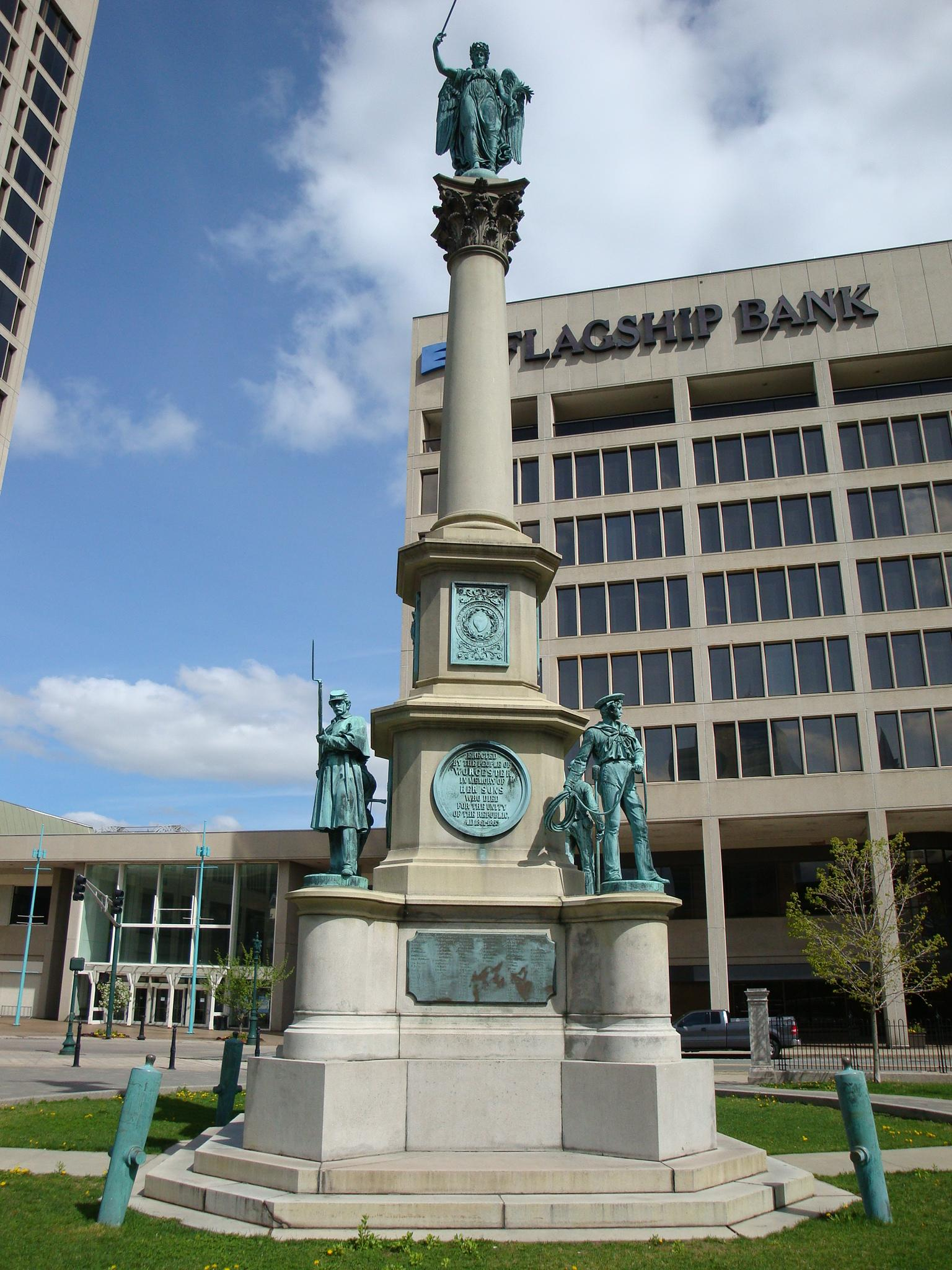
Soldiers' Monument in 2009.

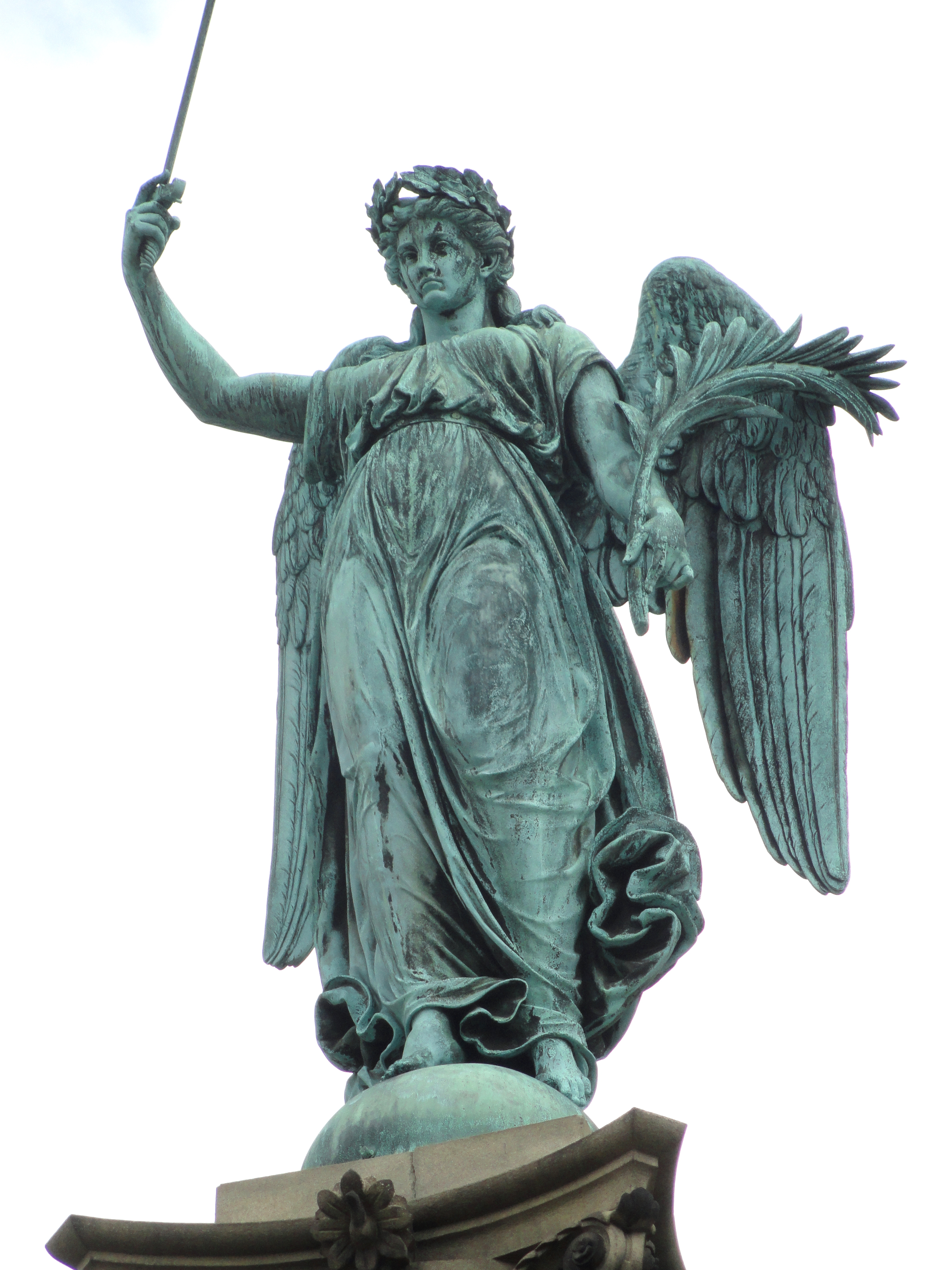
Goddess of Victory.

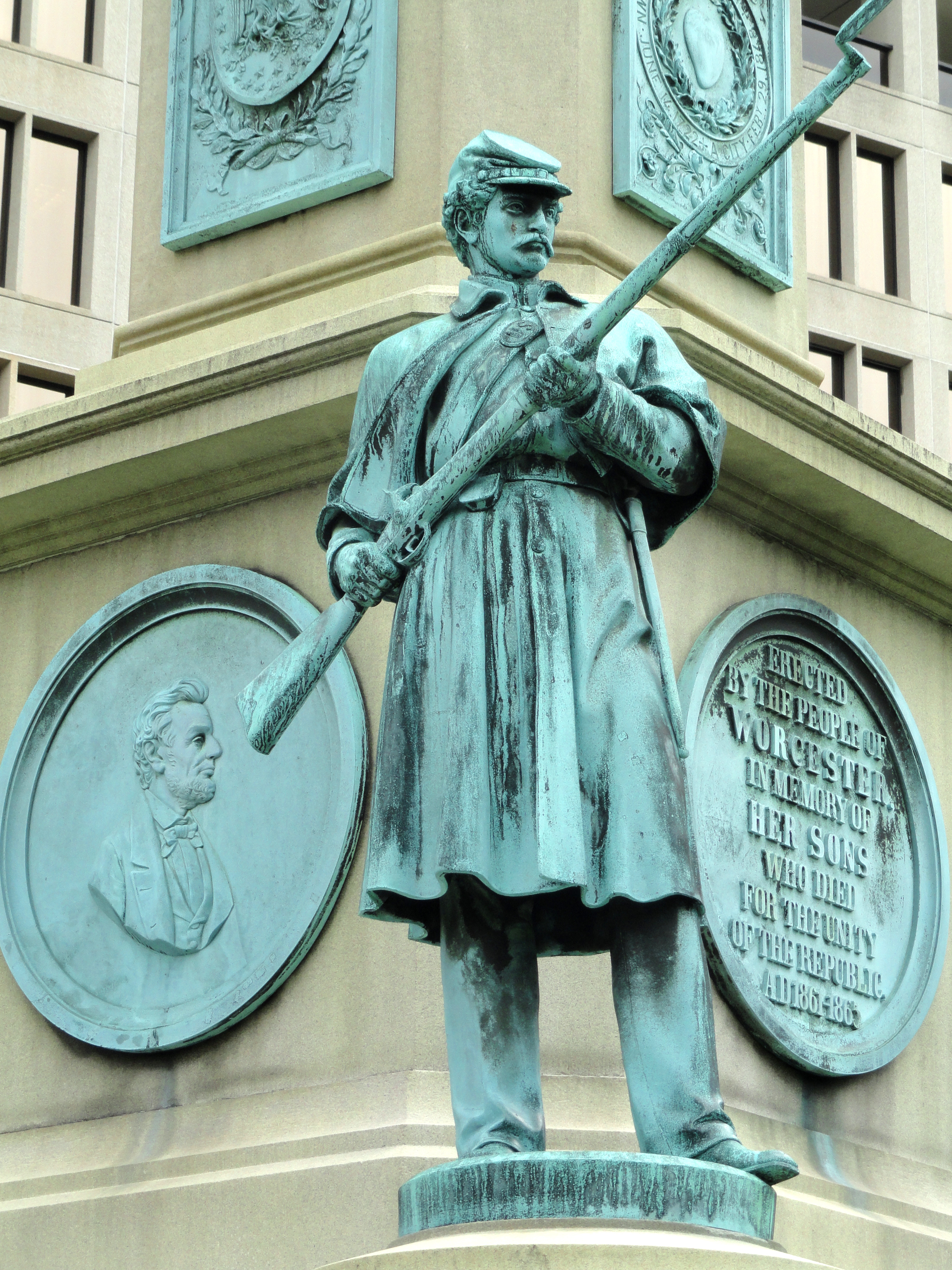
Infantry.

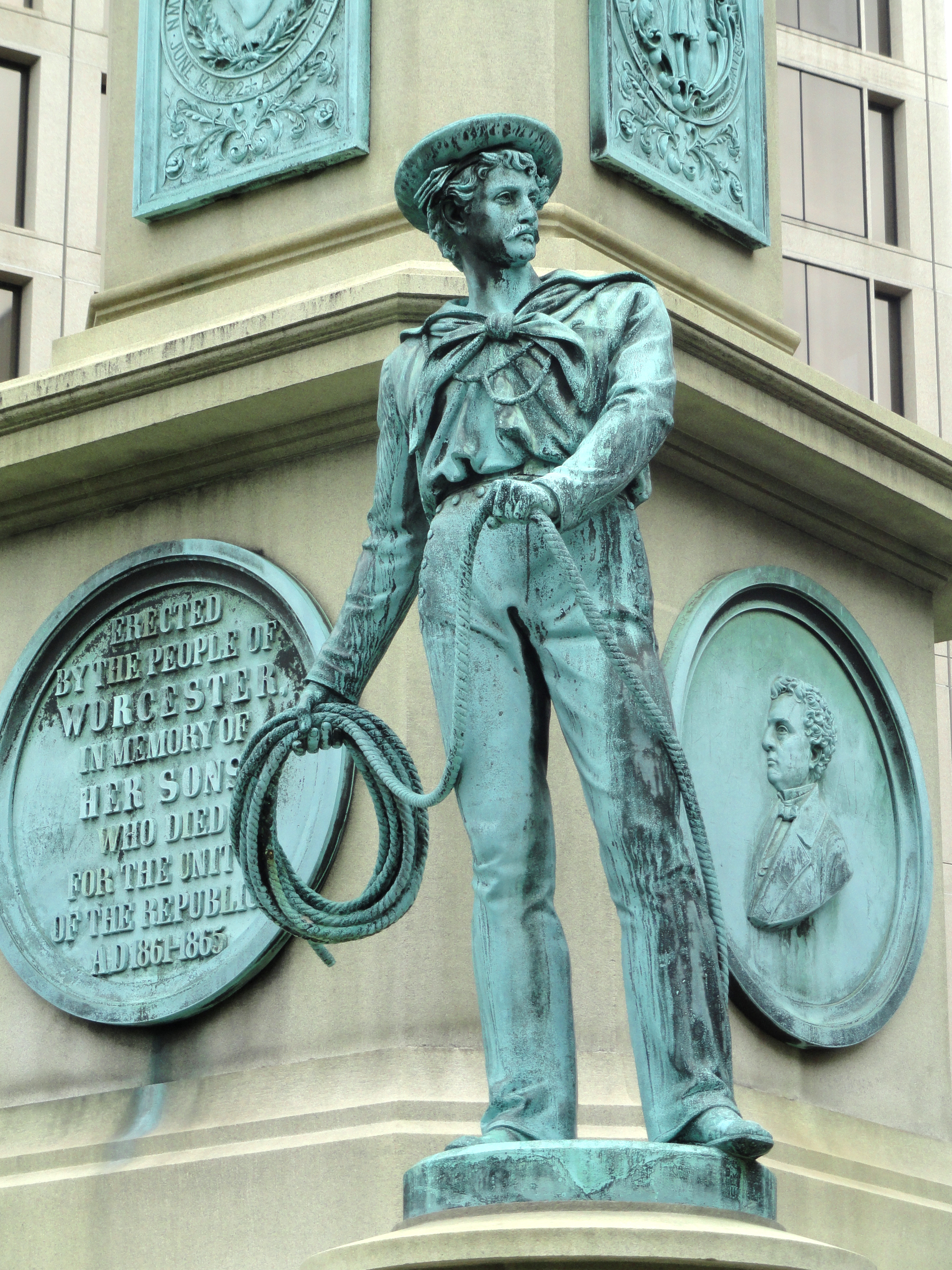
Navy.

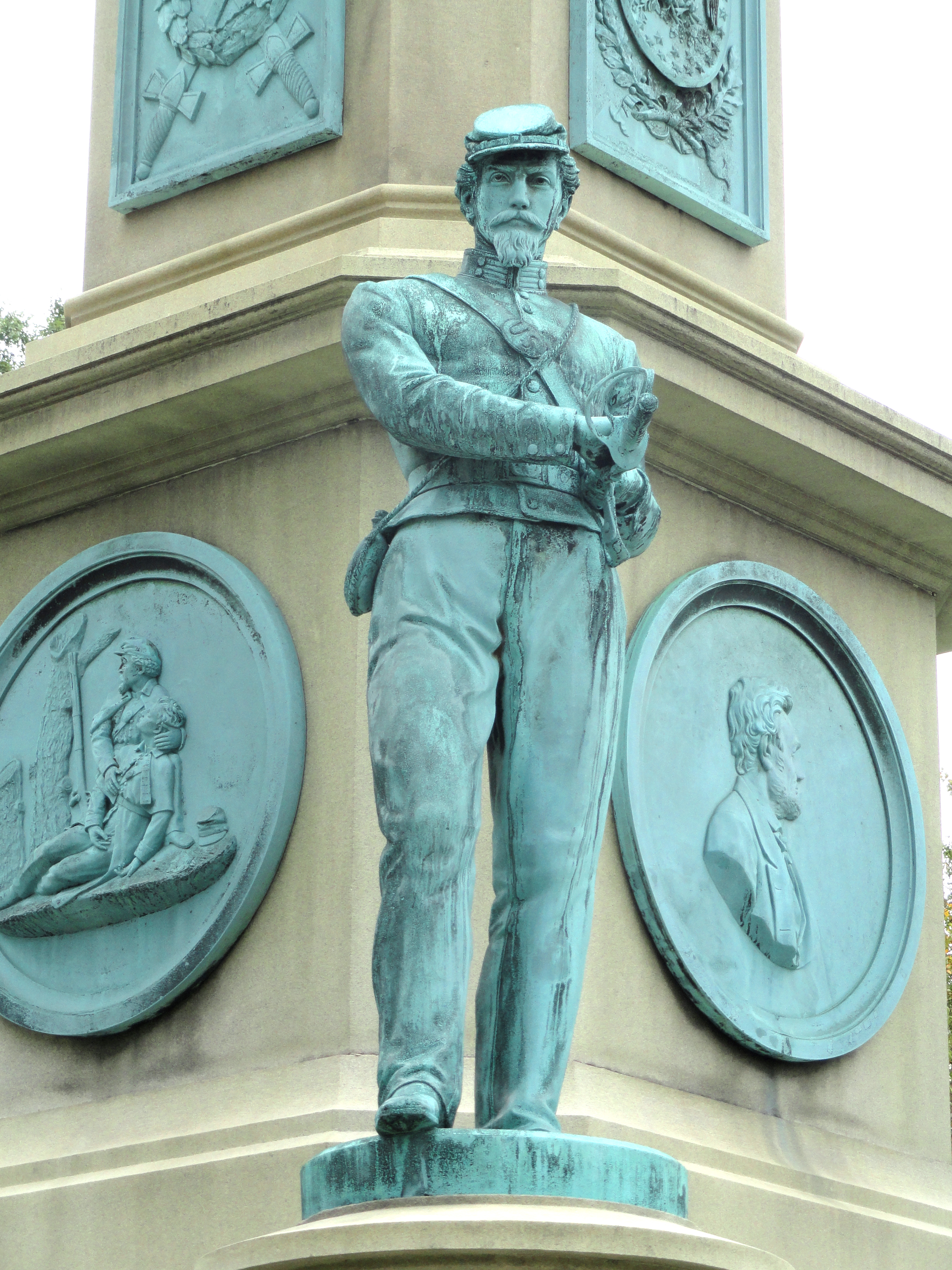
Cavalry.

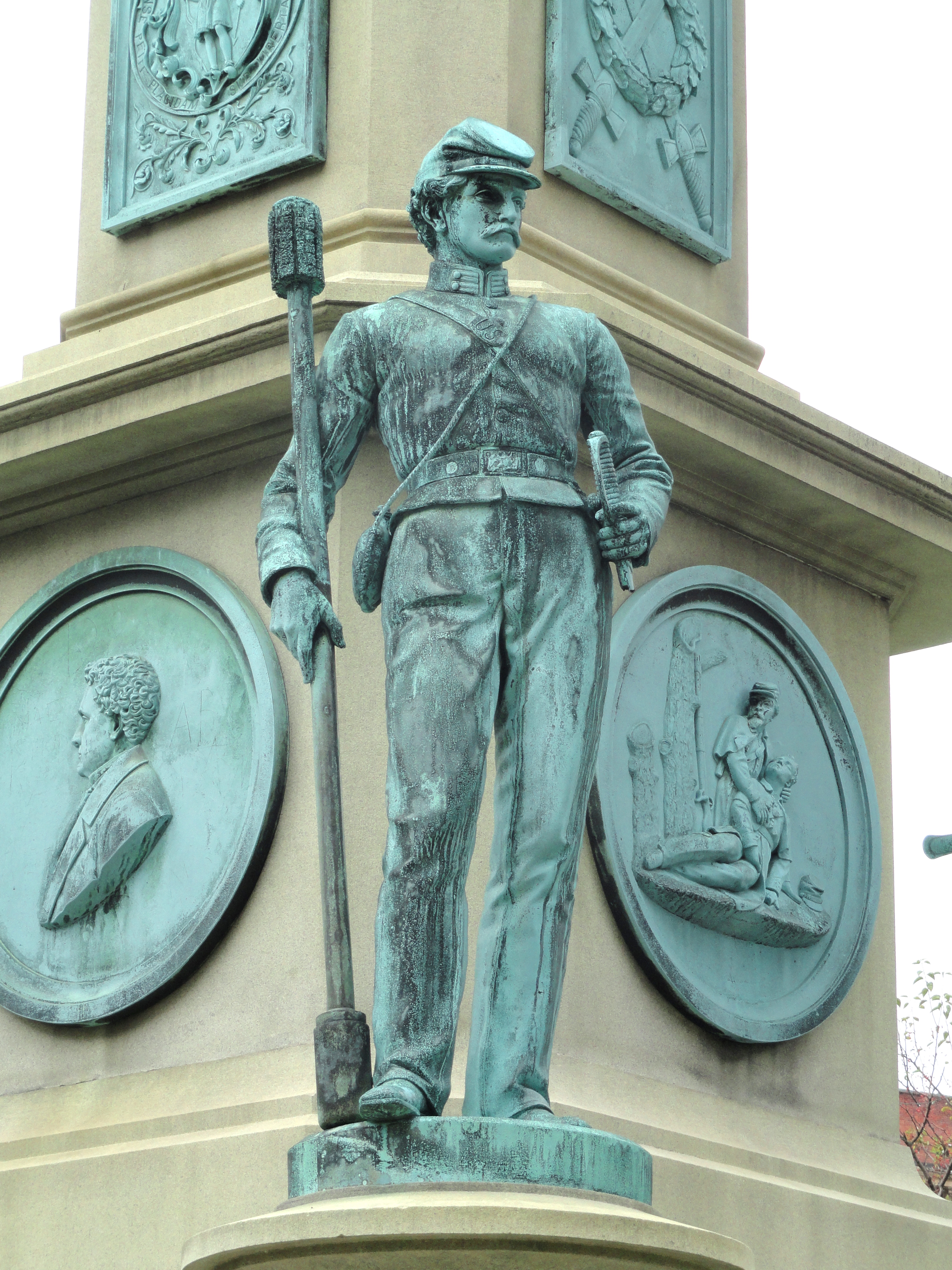
Artillery.

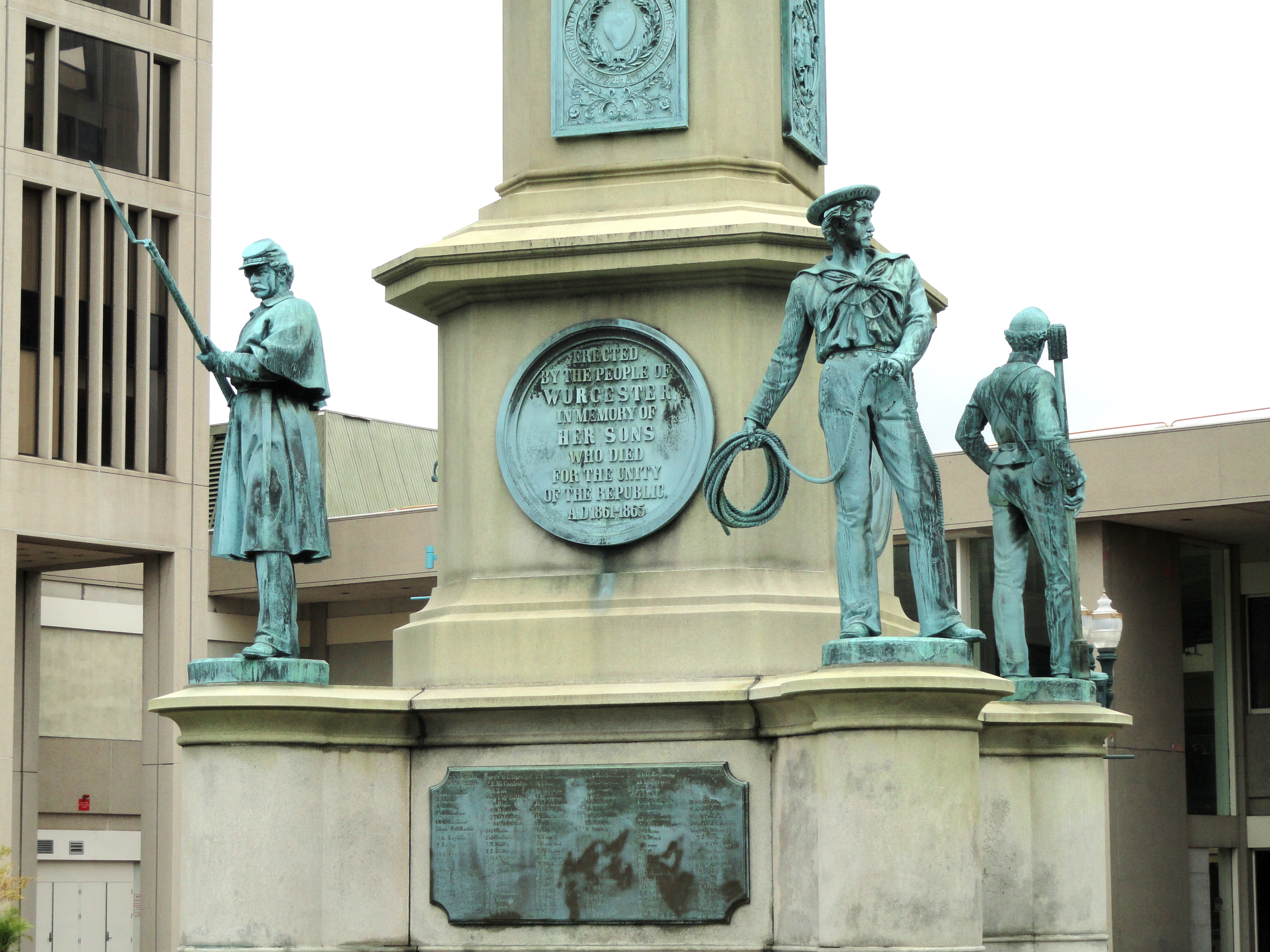
Dedication plaque.
