= List of memorials to Abraham Lincoln =

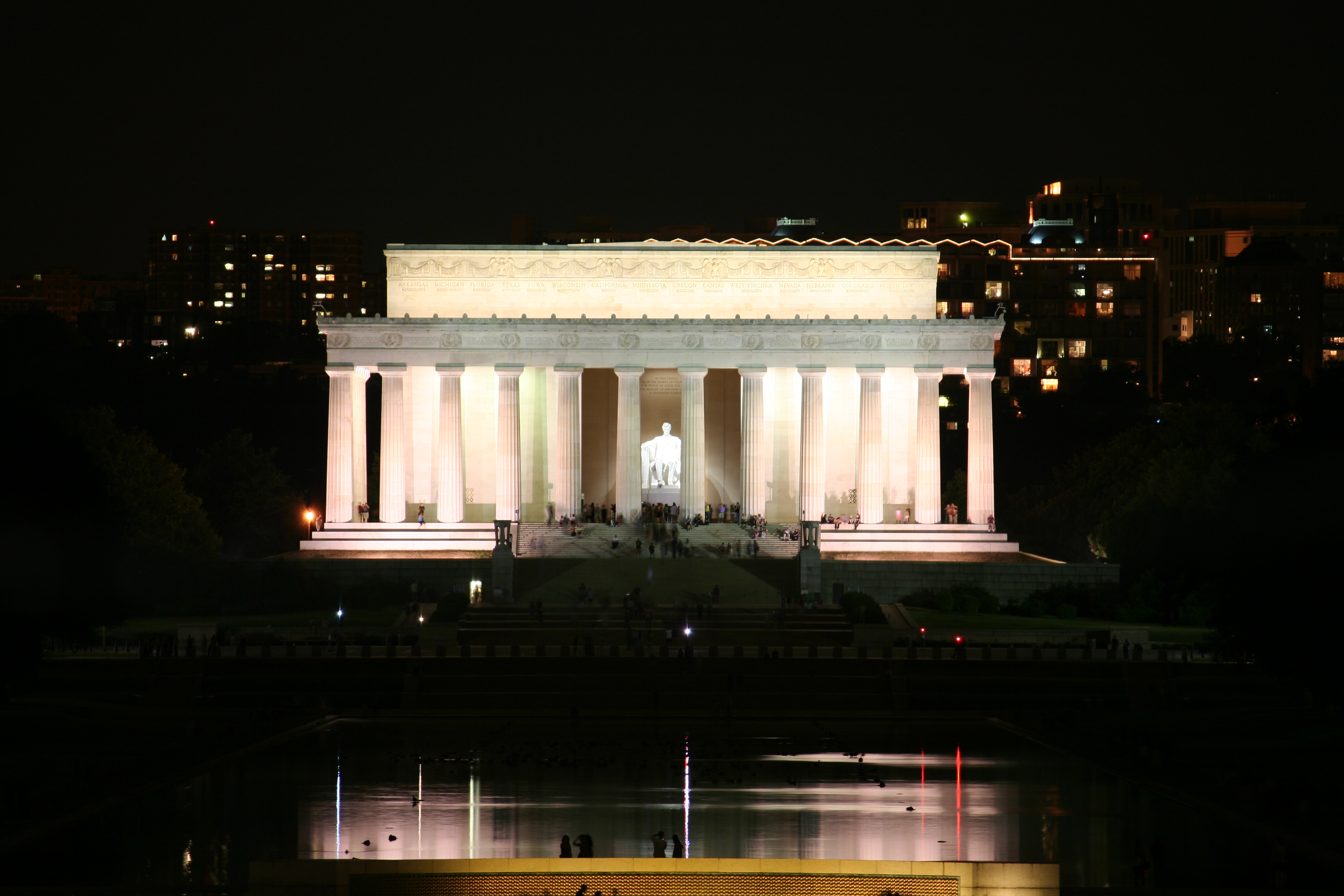
Lincoln Memorial in Washington, D.C.

Abraham Lincoln, the 16th president of the United States, has been memorialized in many town, city, and county names,

== Changing image ==
Barry Schwartz, a sociologist who has examined America's cultural memory, states that in the 1930s and 1940s, the memory of Abraham Lincoln was practically sacred and provided the nation with "a moral symbol inspiring and guiding American life." During the Great Depression, he says, Lincoln served "as a means for seeing the world's disappointments, for making its sufferings not so much explicable as meaningful." Franklin D. Roosevelt, preparing America for World War II, used the words of the American Civil War-era president to clarify the threat posed by Nazi Germany and the Empire of Japan. Americans asked, "What would Lincoln do?" However, he also finds that since World War II, Lincoln's symbolic power has lost relevance, and this "fading hero is symptomatic of fading confidence in national greatness." He suggested that postmodernism and multiculturalism have diluted greatness as a concept.

While Lincoln remains in the very top tier of the historical rankings of presidents of the United States, all of the presidents have slipped in historical prestige in the public's mind. Schwartz said that the reason is what he calls the "acids of equality": as the culture of the United States became more diverse, egalitarian, and multicultural, it also suffered a "deterioration and coarsening of traditional symbols and practices."

Lincoln sites remain popular tourist attractions, but crowds have thinned. In the late 1960s, 650,000 people a year visited the Lincoln Home National Historic Site in Springfield, Illinois, slipping to 393,000 in 2000–2003. Likewise visits to Lincoln's New Salem fell by half, probably because of the enormous draw of the new museum in Springfield. Visits to the Lincoln Memorial in Washington, D.C., peaked at 4.3 million in 1987 and have since declined. However crowds at Ford's Theatre in Washington, D.C., have grown sharply.

== Organizations ==
The oldest continuously operating association in the United States honoring Lincoln is the Lincoln Association of Jersey City in Jersey City, New Jersey, which was formed in 1865 shortly after Lincoln's assassination. The association has held a banquet in Jersey City every year on Lincoln's birthday, February 12. The association has been addressed by a number of people of national importance, including political figures, military veterans, educators and civil rights leaders. The association celebrated its 150th anniversary on February 12, 2015, which included the laying of a wreath at the entrance to Jersey City's Lincoln Park. The association's annual dinner featured speaker Todd Brewster, author of Lincoln's Gamble, about the struggle to create the Emancipation Proclamation.

== Memorials ==
The memorials include the name of the capital of Nebraska (1867). The first public monument to Abraham Lincoln, after his death, was a statue erected in front of the District of Columbia City Hall in 1868, three years after his assassination.

In 1876, on the anniversary of his death, a memorial, paid for by emancipated citizens to honor the Great Emancipator, the Freedmen's Memorial was dedicated in Lincoln Park, Washington, D.C. Present for the dedication were President Ulysses S. Grant, cabinet members, and representatives of both the Supreme Court and Congress. Frederick Douglass gave the dedication speech.

The first national memorial to Abraham Lincoln was the historic Lincoln Highway, the first road for the automobile across the United States of America, which was dedicated in 1913, predating the 1921 dedication of the Lincoln Memorial in Washington, D.C., by nine years.

Lincoln's name and image appear in numerous other places, such as the Lincoln Memorial in Washington, D.C., and Lincoln's sculpture on Mount Rushmore, Abraham Lincoln Birthplace National Historical Park in Hodgenville, Kentucky, Lincoln Boyhood National Memorial in Lincoln City, Indiana, Lincoln's New Salem, Illinois, and Lincoln Home National Historic Site in Springfield, Illinois commemorate the president. The Lincoln Memorial at Louisville Waterfront Park features a double-life-size sculpture of a seated, hatless Lincoln surrounded by narrative bas relief sculptures by Edward Hamilton which depict the history of slavery as witnessed by Lincoln in the slave markets of Kentucky.

Ford's Theatre and Petersen House (where he died) are maintained as museums, as is the Abraham Lincoln Presidential Library and Museum, located in Springfield. The Lincoln Tomb in Oak Ridge Cemetery in Springfield, Illinois, contains his remains and those of his wife Mary and three of his four sons, Edward, William, and Thomas. Springfield's airport is named for him, the Abraham Lincoln Capital Airport.

There was also the Great Moments with Mr. Lincoln exhibit in Disneyland, and the Hall of Presidents exhibit at Walt Disney World, which was based on Walt Disney admiring Lincoln ever since he was a little boy.

Lincoln Memorial University located in Harrogate, Tennessee near the Cumberland Gap National Historical Park was established in 1897 as a living memorial to President Lincoln. The Abraham Lincoln Library and Museum located on campus, houses a large collection of memorabilia relating to the school's namesake.

The Lincoln Memorial Shrine was built in 1932 in Redlands, California. It has an original Lincoln bust by George Grey Barnard, and is the only museum and research center dedicated to the memory of Lincoln west of the Mississippi River.

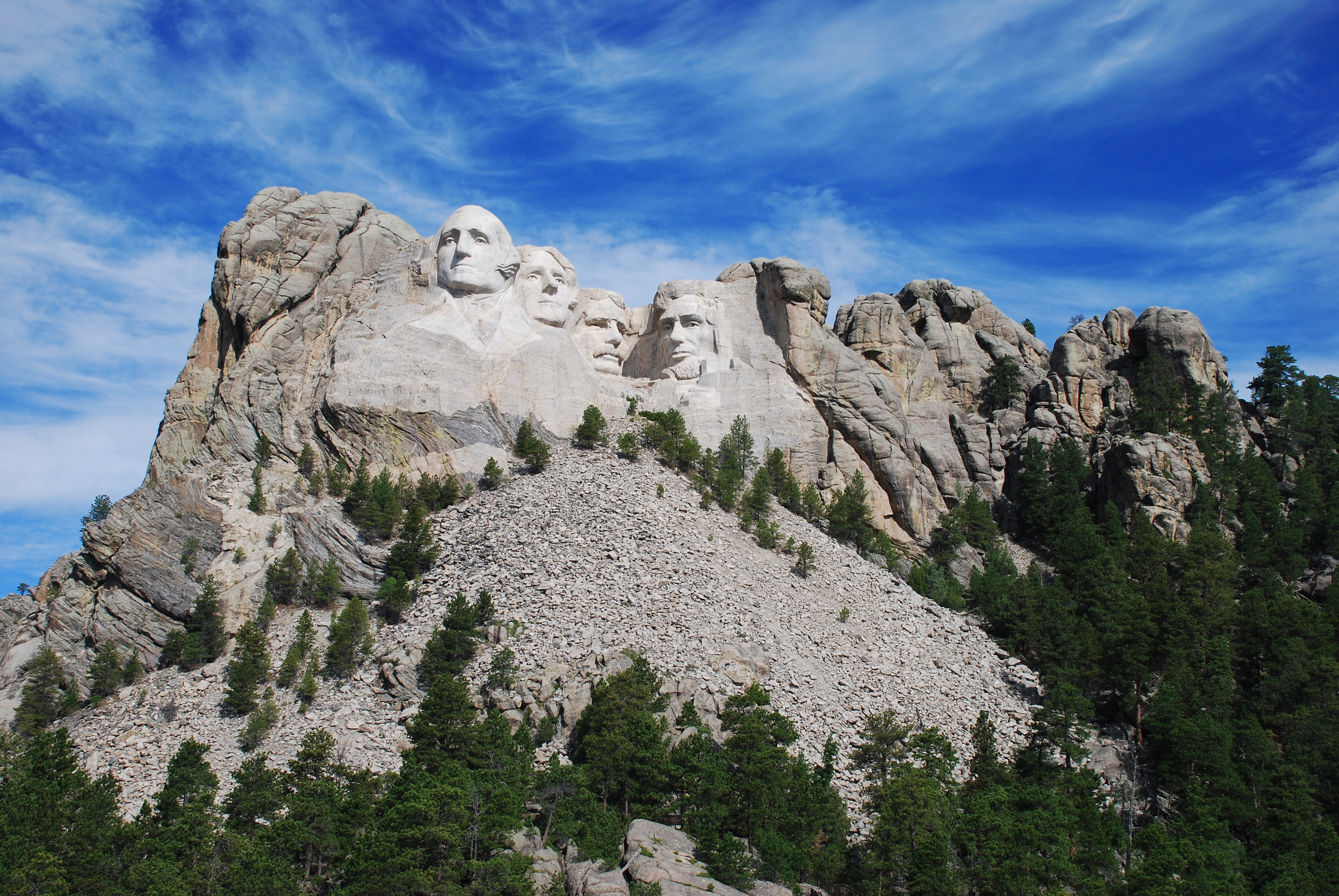
Mount Rushmore, showing the full size of the mountain and the scree of rocks from the sculpting and construction

=== Desecration ===
On the night of November 7, 1876, a group of counterfeiters entered Lincoln's tomb with the intent of absconding with his mortal remains and holding them for ransom in order to secure the release of their leader, Benjamin Boyd, an imprisoned engraver of counterfeit currency plates. The group entered his tomb, but had only succeeded in partially dislodging its marble lid before a US Secret Service agent who had infiltrated their number alerted law enforcement authorities. Although several escaped, most served a one-year prison term. For much of the next decade (c. 1876 – 1887), Lincoln's tomb was mobile, to avoid further unwanted disinterment.

=== Statue burning ===
On August 16, 2017, a bust of Abraham Lincoln in a park in West Englewood, Chicago was spray-painted black and later covered in tar and set on fire. The bust restoration was finished in 2018, it was then moved to the Chicago Public Library.

== Stamps, currency and coins ==
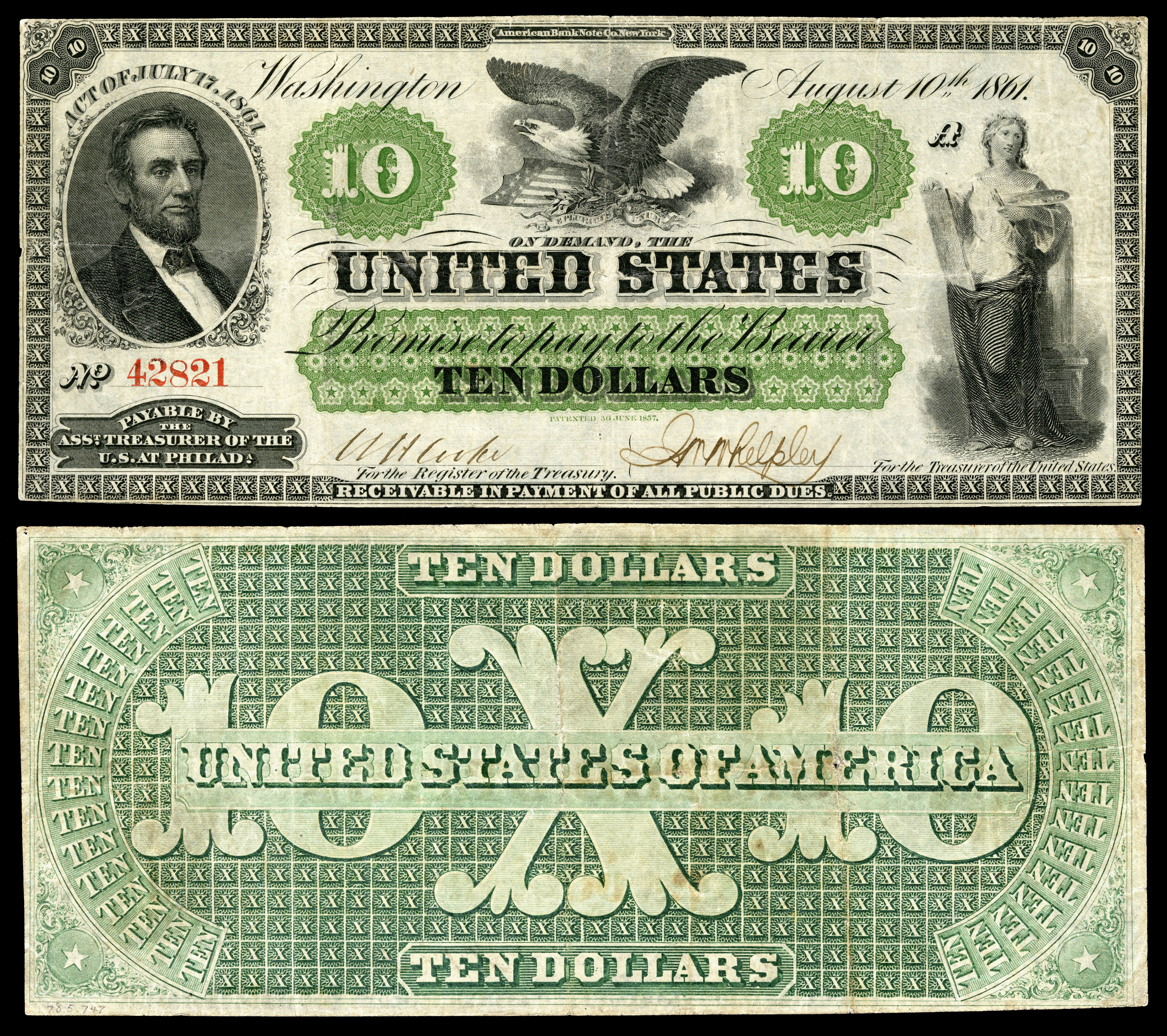
$10 Demand Note issued in 1861, while Lincoln was still alive.

Within a year of this death, Lincoln's image began to be disseminated throughout the world on stamps. Pictured on many United States postage stamps, Lincoln is the only U.S. president to appear on a U.S. airmail stamp.

To date, more than 50 nations around the world have issued postage bearing his image.

Lincoln was one of five people to be depicted on United States paper currency (federal issue) during their lifetime (along with Salmon P. Chase, Francis E. Spinner, Spencer M. Clark, and Winfield Scott). He has been featured on several denominations ($1, $5, $10, $20, $100, and $500) across different issues (e.g., Demand Notes, Legal Tender, Gold Certificates, Silver Certificates, etc.) since the first federally issued U.S. Bank Note in 1861. In addition to the modern United States five-dollar bill, currency honoring the president includes the Lincoln cent, which represents the first regularly circulating U.S. coin to feature an actual person's image.

Lincoln's image on the five-dollar bill was used by Salvador Dalí to help commemorate the U.S. Bicentennial with his creation of "Gala looking at the Mediterranean Sea which at a distance of 20 meters is transformed into the portrait of Abraham Lincoln (Homage to Rothko)" and Lincoln in Dalivision, the earlier of which was displayed at The Guggenheim in New York during the 1976 Bicentennial.

== International ==
The first statue of Lincoln outside the United States was erected in Edinburgh, Scotland in 1893. The work of George Edwin Bissell, it stands on a memorial to Scots immigrants who enlisted with the Union during the Civil War, the only memorial to the war erected outside the United States. A second statue by George Grey Barnard was erected in Manchester, England in 1919. Nowadays situated in Lincoln Square west of Manchester Town Hall, the statue commemorates the impact the American Civil War had on the cotton cloth-producing region of Manchester and Lancashire. A large statue of Lincoln standing by Saint Gaudens was unveiled near Westminster Abbey in London, on July 28, 1920, in an elaborate ceremony. The principal addresses were delivered in Central Hall, Westminster. In 1964, United States President Lyndon Johnson presented a Saint Gaudens to the people of Mexico, which is displayed in Mexico City's Parque Lincoln. Also in Mexico, a monument in Tijuana was unveiled in 1981 while a reciprocal statue of Lincoln's contemporary and friend President Benito Juarez was unveiled in neighboring San Diego.

== Birthday ==
Abraham Lincoln's birthday, February 12, was never a national holiday, but it was at one time observed by as many as 30 states. In 1971, Presidents Day became a national holiday, combining Lincoln's and Washington's birthdays and replacing most states' celebration of his birthday. The Abraham Lincoln Association was formed in 1908 to commemorate the centennial of Lincoln's birth. In 2000, Congress established the Abraham Lincoln Bicentennial Commission to commemorate his 200th birthday in February 2009.

== Sculpture in the United States ==
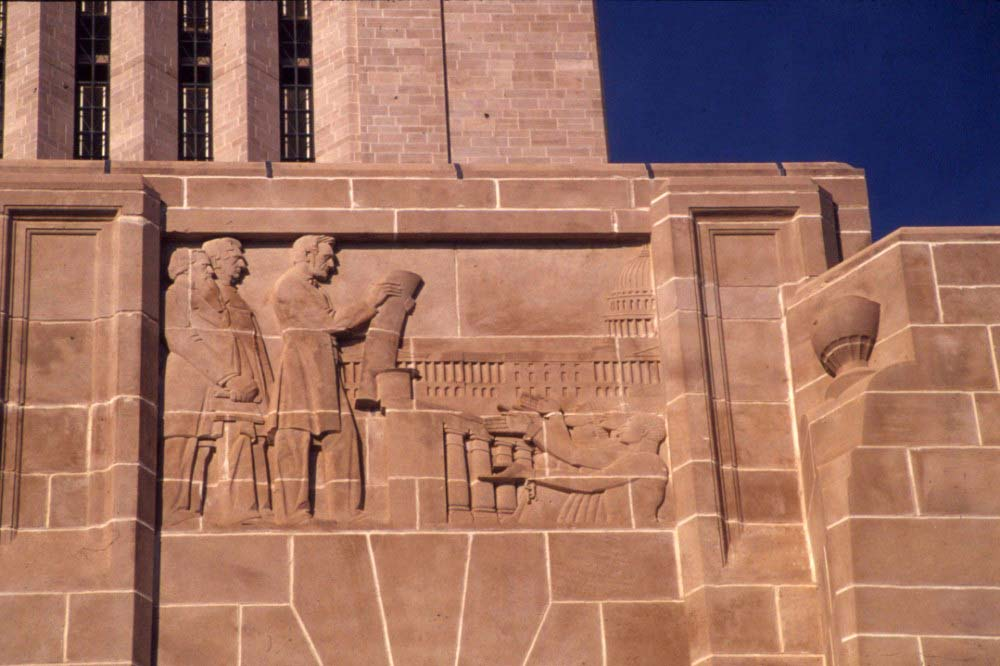
Emancipation Proclamation, Lee Lawrie, Nebraska State Capitol, Lincoln, Nebraska

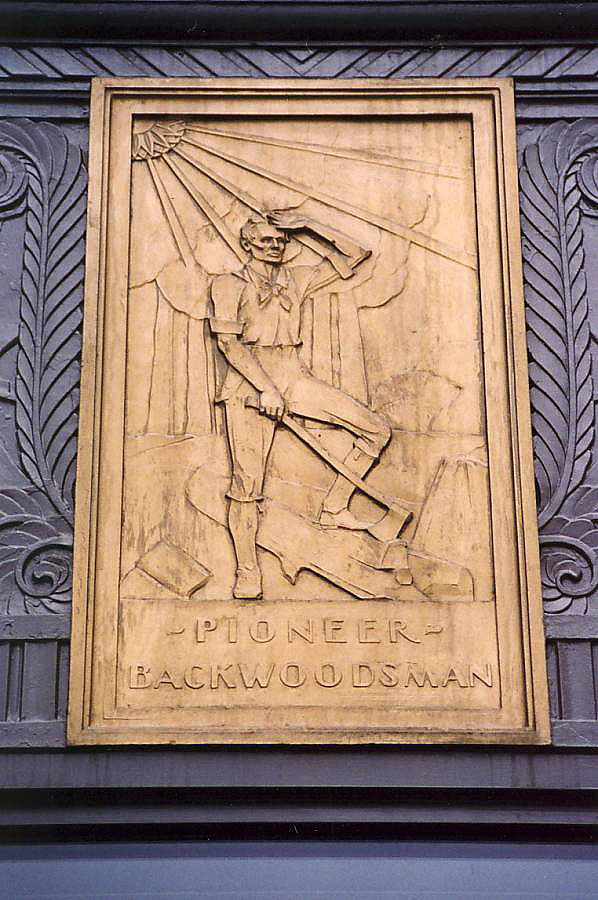
Pioneer-Backwoodsman, Lincoln Tower, Ft. Wayne, Indiana

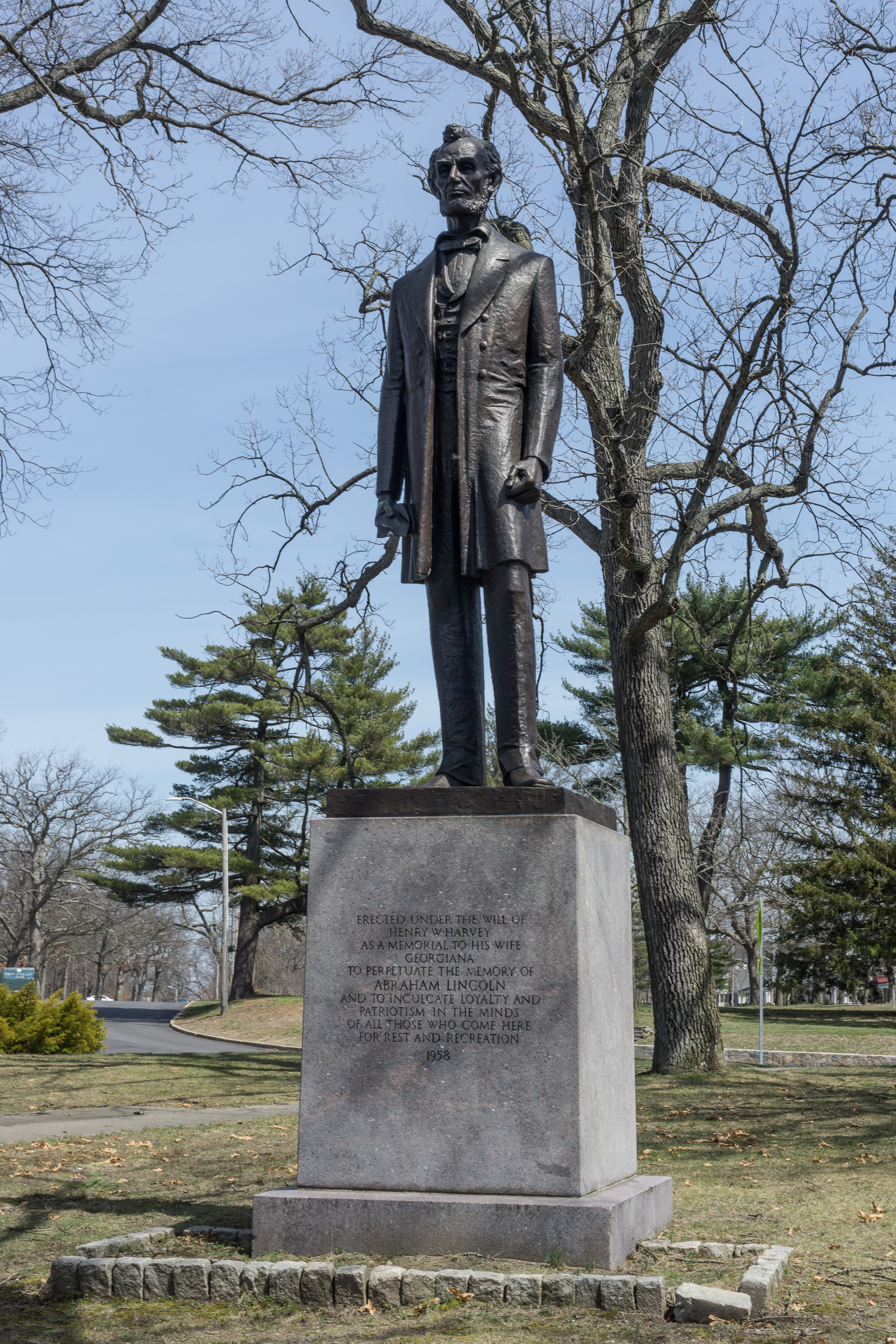
Roger Williams Park, Providence, Rhode Island

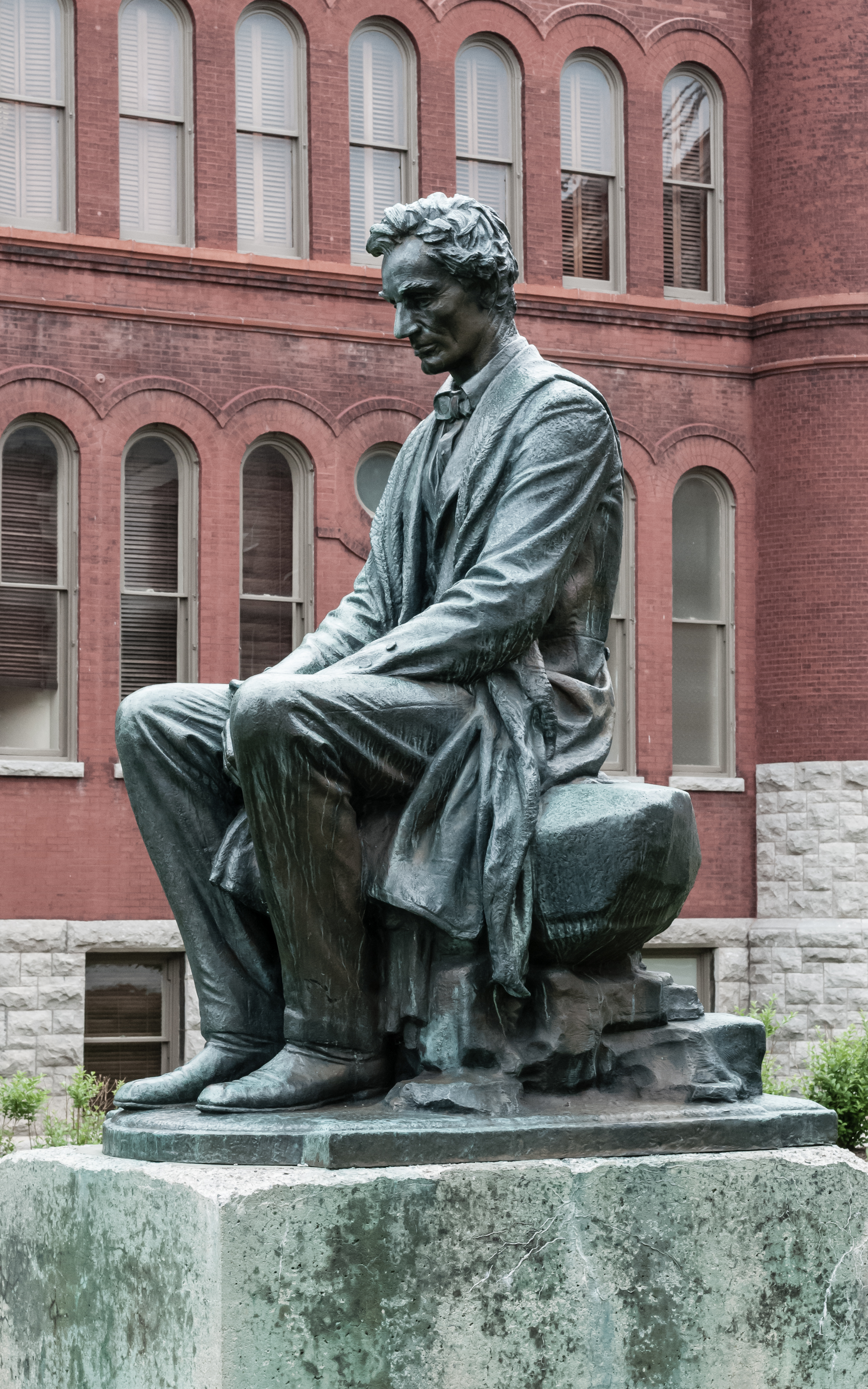
Seated Lincoln at Syracuse University

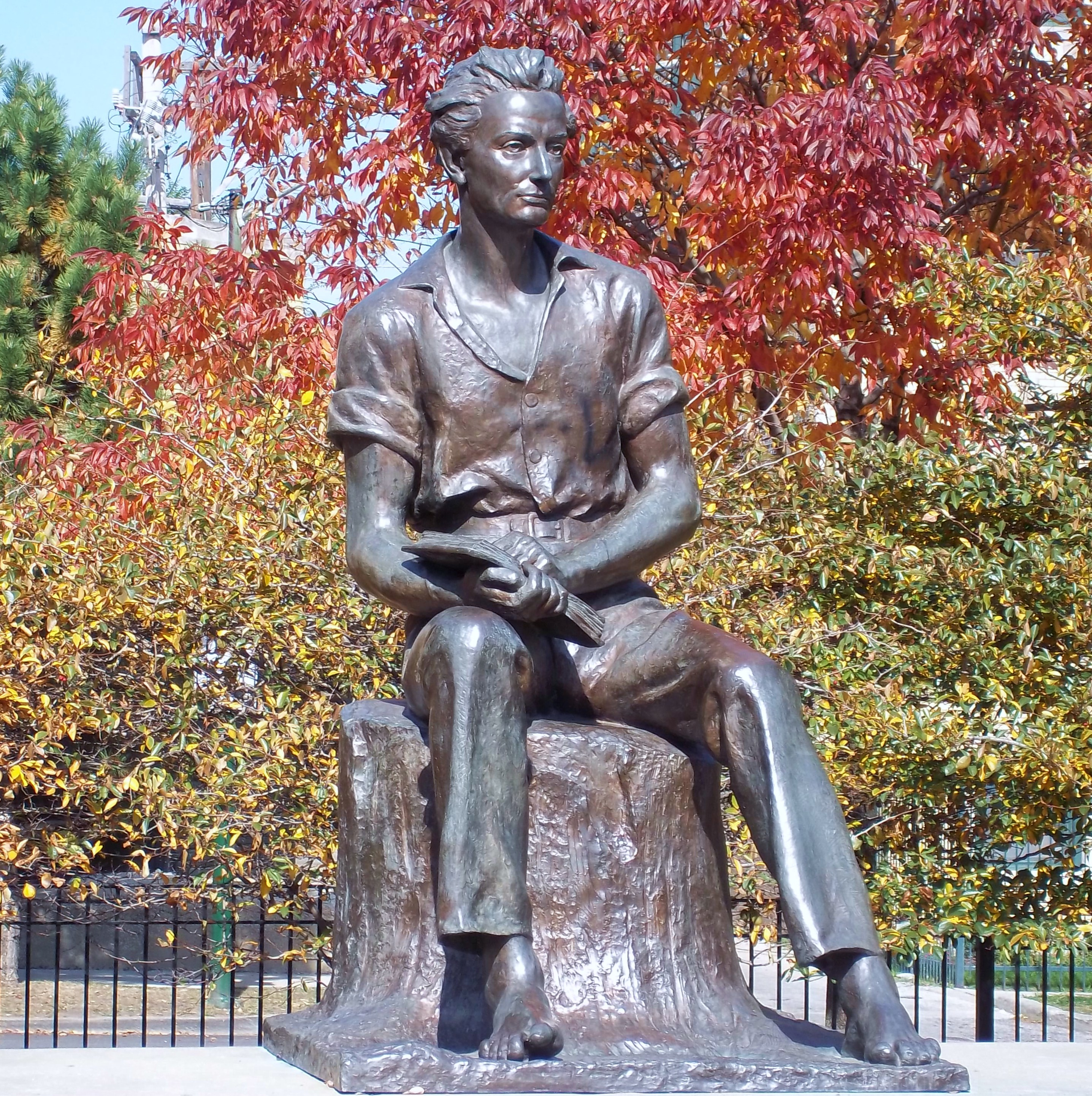
Young Lincoln by Charles Keck, in Chicago

- bas relief on the "Michigan Soldiers' and Sailors' Monument", Detroit, Michigan, 1867
- Abraham Lincoln, Lot Flannery, Washington, D.C. (1868)
- Statue of Abraham Lincoln, Henry Kirke Brown, Union Square, New York City (1870)
- Abraham Lincoln, Henry Kirke Brown, Prospect Park, Brooklyn, New York (1869)
- Abraham Lincoln, Vinnie Ream, United States Capitol rotunda, Washington, D.C. (1871)
- Lincoln Tomb, Larkin Goldsmith Mead, Springfield, Illinois (1874)
- Emancipation Memorial, Thomas Ball, Washington, D.C. (1876)
- Life Mask and Hands of Abraham Lincoln, Augustus Saint-Gaudens, original casting by Leonard Wells Volk (1886).
- Abraham Lincoln: The Man, aka Standing Lincoln, Augustus Saint Gaudens, Chicago, Illinois (1887). A reduced version is in the Metropolitan Museum of Art in New York City.
- Abraham Lincoln, Alfonso Pelzer, (original 1898, in Middlesex, NJ - this cast ca. 1915) Detroit, Michigan
- Abraham Lincoln Statue and Park, Clermont, Iowa, 1902
- Lincoln, The Emancipator, Charles Henry Niehaus, Buffalo History Museum, Buffalo, New York (1902) (a replica exists in Muskegon, Michigan)
- Abraham Lincoln: The Head of State aka Seated Lincoln, Augustus Saint Gaudens, Chicago, Illinois (1908)
- Abraham Lincoln, Adolph Alexander Weinman, Hodgenville, Kentucky (1909)
- Seated Lincoln, Gutzon Borglum, Newark, New Jersey (1911)
- Abraham Lincoln, Adolph Alexander Weinman, Kentucky State Capitol, Frankfort, Kentucky (1911)
- Standing Lincoln at the Nebraska State Capitol, Lincoln, Nebraska, Daniel Chester French (1912)
- Abraham Lincoln at The Pennsylvania State Memorial, J. Otto Schweizer, Gettysburg, Pennsylvania (1913)
- Statue of Abraham Lincoln, George Grey Barnard, Cincinnati, Ohio (1917)
- Abraham Lincoln in the Lincoln Memorial, Daniel Chester French (1914–22)
- Statue of Abraham Lincoln, Civic Center, San Francisco, Haig Patigian (1926)
- Lincoln the Lawyer, Urbana, Illinois, Lorado Taft (1927)
- Statue of Abraham Lincoln, South Park Blocks, Portland, Oregon, George Fite Waters (1928)
- Mount Rushmore, Gutzon Borglum (1927–1941)
- Lincoln Monument (Dixon, Illinois), Leonard Crunelle (1930)
- Lincoln Bank Tower, 3 panels, Pioneer Backwoodsman, Preservation of the Union and Emancipation Proclamation Fort Wayne, Indiana (1930)
- Emancipation Proclamation, Nebraska State Capitol, Lee Lawrie, Lincoln, Nebraska (1932)
- Abraham Lincoln: The Hoosier Youth, Paul Manship, Fort Wayne, Indiana (1932)
- Abraham Lincoln Walks at Midnight, by Fred Torrey (1933), cast by Bernard Wiepper, West Virginia State Capitol (1974)
- Abraham Lincoln Statue, Bryant Baker, Delaware Park, Buffalo, New York (1935)
- Lincoln Trail State Memorial, Nellie Verne Walker, near Lawrenceville, Illinois (1938)
- Abraham Lincoln Monument, Samuel Cashwan, Ypsilanti, Michigan (1938)
- Abraham Lincoln statue by Charles Keck in Hingham, Massachusetts (1939). Lincoln's ancestors had settled in Hingham.
- Young Lincoln by Charles Keck, Senn Park, Chicago (1945)
- The Chicago Lincoln, aka Beardless Lincoln, Avard Fairbanks, Chicago, Illinois (1956)
- Abraham Lincoln by Gilbert A. Franklin, Roger Williams Park in Providence, Rhode Island (1958). This 12-foot bronze is the only monument to Abraham Lincoln in Rhode Island.
- Young Abe Lincoln, David K. Rubins, Indianapolis, Indiana (1962)
- Young Abraham Lincoln, also known as Abraham Lincoln on Horseback, "Abraham Lincoln Equestriam Monument," and Abraham Lincoln on the Prairie, Anna Hyatt Huntington, editions located in Northwood Institute, Midland, Michigan, (1963): State University of New York, College of Environmental Science and Forestry, Syracuse, New York (1963): Salem State Park, Petersburg, Illinois, (1963–64): Lincoln City, Oregon, (1965):
- Seated Lincoln, a 1968 cast of the 1930 James Earle Fraser bronze at Syracuse University, New York.
- Lincoln's Bench (2006) by Mark Lundeen at the Abraham Lincoln Presidential Library and Museum.
- Mr. Lincoln's Square, Clinton, Illinois
- State of Lincoln "outside the old ironworks that powered the Confederate artillery," Richmond, Virginia.

== See also ==
- List of Union Civil War monuments and memorials
- List of memorials to the Grand Army of the Republic
- List of memorials to Robert E. Lee
- List of memorials to Jefferson Davis
- List of Confederate monuments and memorials
- List of statues of Abraham Lincoln
- Removal of Confederate monuments and memorials
