= The Young Lincoln =

1941 statue in Los Angeles, California, U.S.

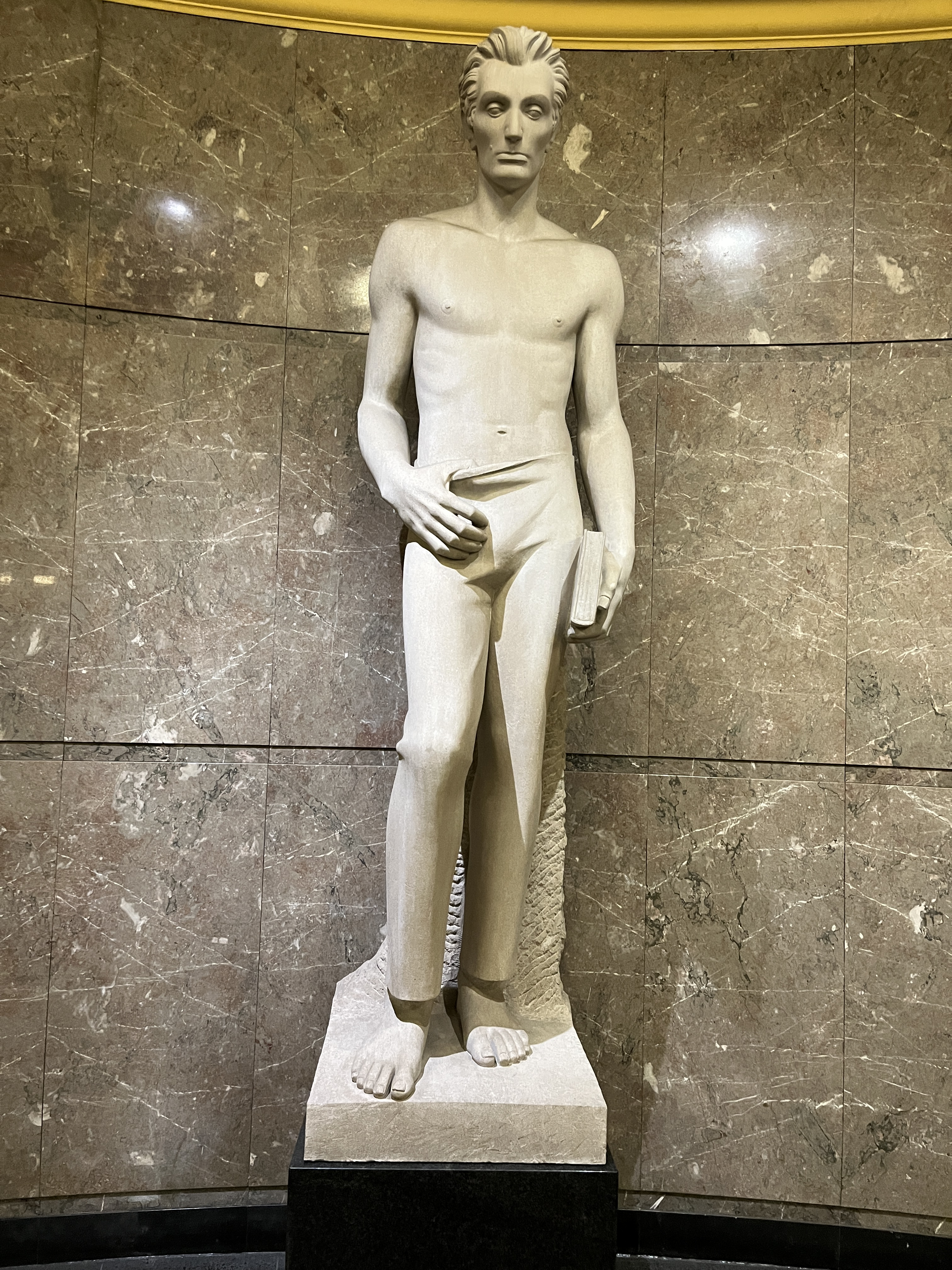
- The statue in 2022
- Artist: James Lee Hansen
- Year: 1941
- Dimensions: 240 cm (8 ft)
- Location: Los Angeles, California, U.S.

The Young Lincoln is a statue of Abraham Lincoln created by James Lee Hansen (1917-1998) in 1941, installed in the Spring Street Courthouse, in Los Angeles in the U.S. state of California.

The statue exemplifies public art of the New Deal, including its depiction of Lincoln in his youth, a popular topic of the era. It was built as a result of Hansen winning a 1939 Federal Works Agency art contest, and it was the first large sculpture he had ever completed. In creating the statue, Hansen "developed his own interpretation of Lincoln, portraying him as a young man standing barefoot and shirtless - a man of deep sentiment and understanding."

In 2019, it gained renewed attention on Twitter, wherein users nicknamed the statue "Hot Lincoln."

== Description ==
The 8-foot tall statue (2.4 m) is made of Indiana limestone on a black granite pedestal. The sculpture shows "Lincoln as a young man, wearing only a pair of jeans, with the thumb of one hand hooked in the band of the garment and with a book in the other hand." His eyes are "cast downward as if in thought."

He is placed in the north end of the lobby, providing a backdrop of deep green terrazzo floors and orange marble-lined walls. He stands across from Archibald Garner statue Law, also 8 feet tall, depicting a woman gesturing to a tablet on which is inscribed Abraham Lincoln quote: "No law is stronger than is the public sentiment where it is to be enforced." Both were winners of the 1939 New Deal Arts Program contest.

== History ==
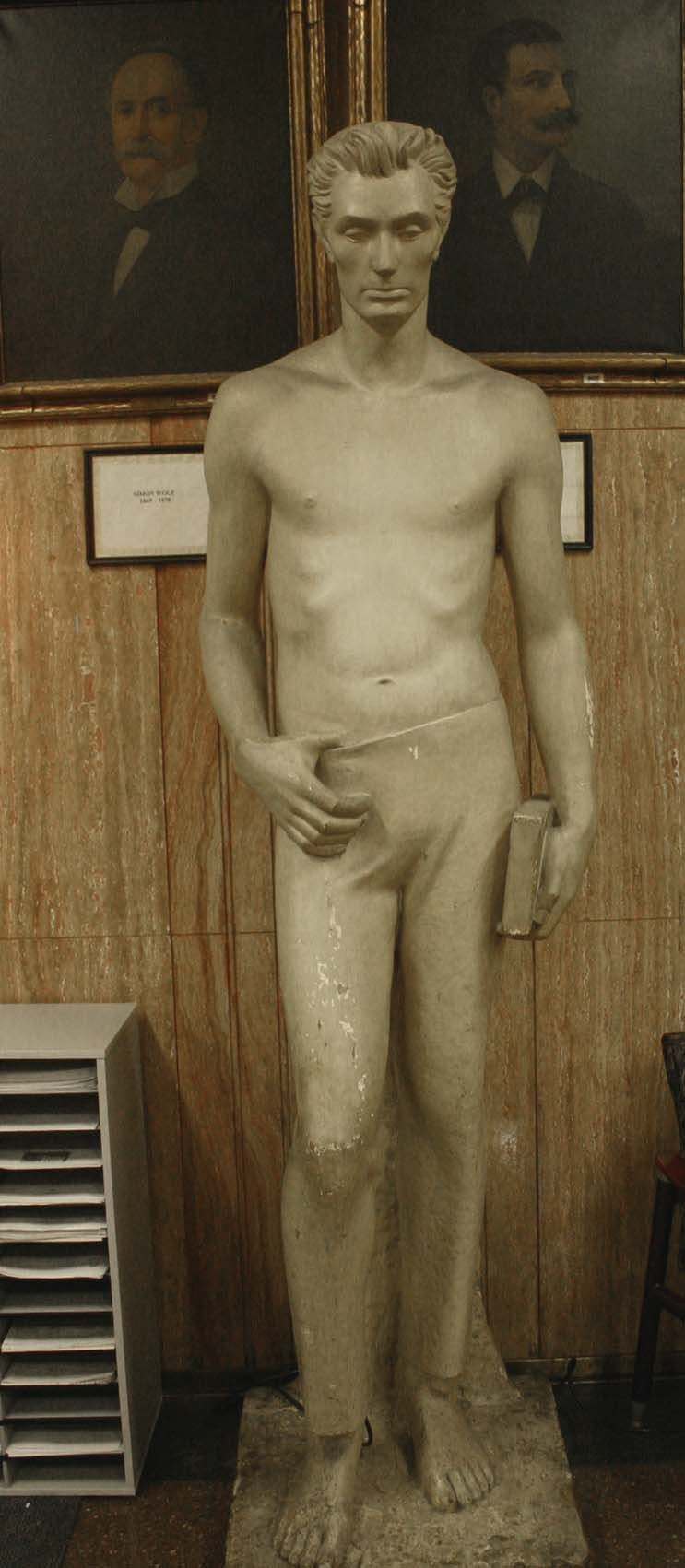
Plaster cast of the original

In 1939, Fresno sculptor James Lee Hansen (born 1917) was "discouraged and dissatisfied with his progress" at the Los Angeles Art Center school. The 22-year-old student considered moving to New York to accept art commissions, as he was struggling to afford meals and was "an improvident student."

That year, Hansen accompanied his teacher to a stoneyard and asked how to work with limestone. The teacher responded that it was simple: "Just hack at it." Hansen took a small piece of stone and created a sculpture of an athlete within 10 days, impressing his peers and teachers.

Presumably as a response, his friend then told him about the Federal Works Agency's contest to design a statue "for the decoration of the Los Angeles Post Office and Courthouse Lobby." The competition was anonymous and open to all sculptors west of the Mississippi as part of the New Deal Art Program. In response to the idea, Hansen said, "I don’t know; I’ve only done one piece of sculpture in my life." Nevertheless, Hansen determined to apply, but discovered the contest had been open for months and only a week remained until the deadline. He "got a supply of plaster and made a small figure of Lincoln" and submitted it.

Hansen was later alerted by mail that his entry won $7,200 and the sculpture's commission. The Times claims that Hansen "was so shocked that he bought a new car, promptly wrecked it, [and] spent 18 days in jail."

Within a year, he carved The Young Lincoln outdoors, in the backyard of a $25-a-month shack he rented on the edge of Hollywood. He used his own body as the model.

In 1939, it was exhibited in the WPA building of the 1939 New York World's Fair. The building had an outdoor theater that showed a documentary about "the achievements of the Works Program as a temporary alleviation of mass unemployment," as well as live crafting exhibits such as wool spinning, pottery, and wood carving. The statue was likely housed in the WPA's Contemporary Art Building which displayed nearly one thousand works of art from living artists.

On March 12, 1941, the 8-foot-tall (2.4 m) sculpture was established at the Main Street lobby of the then-new Federal Building. However, Hansen did not expect an unveiling ceremony and press. Hansen brought files with him, intending to smooth off the rough edges of the limestone figure, and "was somewhat flustered by the arrival of news photographers and reporters."

Almost immediately, Hansen was criticized for portraying Lincoln scantily clad and barefoot. In response to the criticism, Hansen was recorded to have shrugged and stated, "Well, from a sculpturing standpoint, it’s better to show the body without any clothes. That’s why I left ’em off."

The following day, the story of the sculpture and its creator was published in the Los Angeles Times.

== Renewed interest ==
On February 20, 2019, American screenwriter Zack Stentz wrote a tweet describing the statue as "a shirtless young stud suggestively tugging at his waistband like a Sports Illustrated swimsuit model." This brought renewed interest to the statue. The Washington Post collected comedic puns given to the statue by Twitter users, including "Gettysburg Undress," "Honest Abs," and "Babe-raham Lincoln."

== See also ==
- List of statues of Abraham Lincoln
- Memorials to Abraham Lincoln
- Young Abe Lincoln (1962)
