= Statue of Abraham Lincoln (San Francisco) =

Statue of Abraham Lincoln in San Francisco, California, U.S.

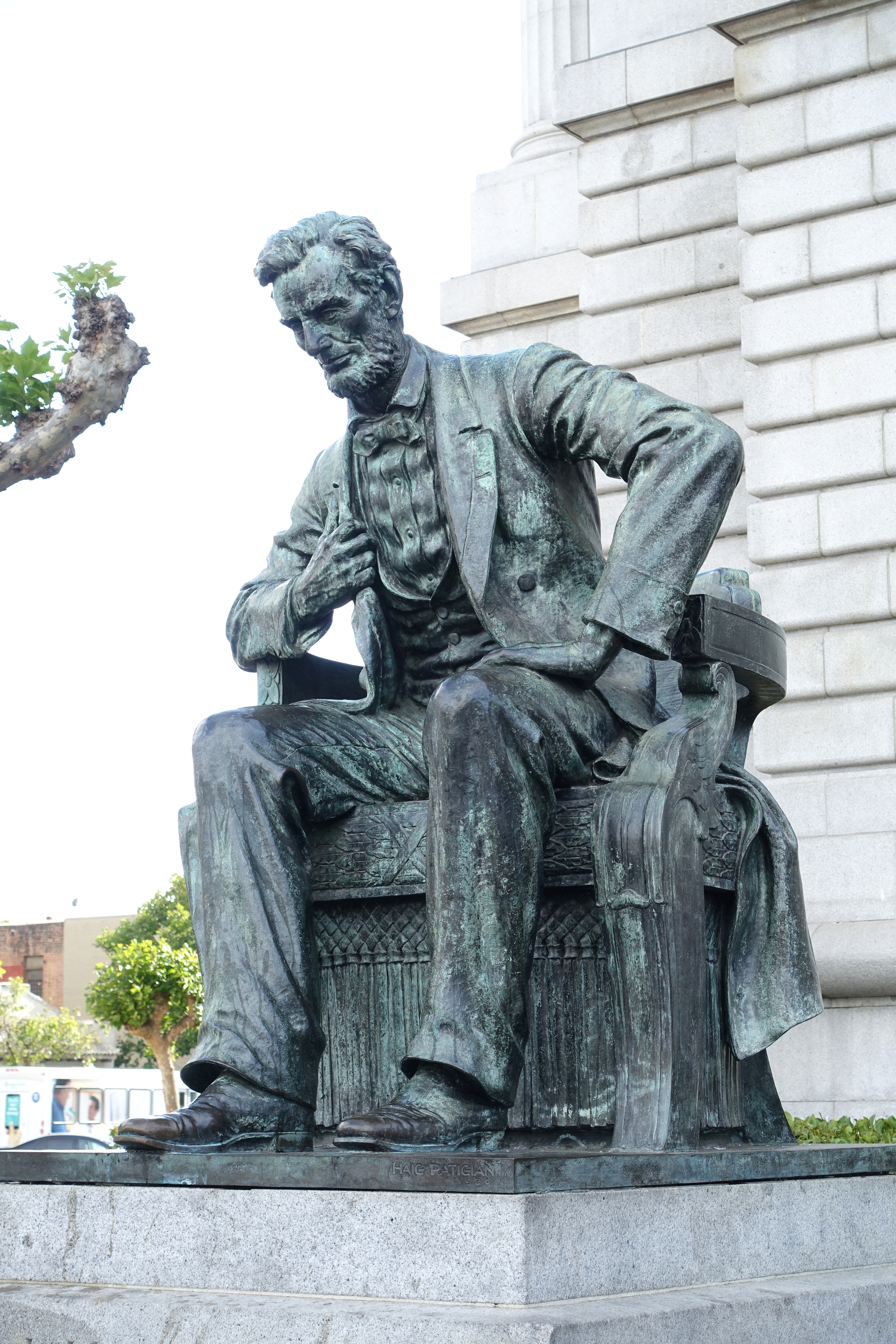
- The statue in 2015
- Artist: Haig Patigian
- Year: 1926
- Type: Sculpture
- Medium: Bronze
- Subject: Abraham Lincoln
- Location: San Francisco, California, United States; 37°46′44″N 122°25′07″W

An outdoor 1926 bronze statue of Abraham Lincoln by Armenian American artist Haig Patigian is installed in Civic Center, San Francisco, California.

== See also ==
- 1926 in art
- Abraham Lincoln cultural depictions
- List of sculptures of presidents of the United States
- List of statues of Abraham Lincoln
- Memorials to Abraham Lincoln
