= List of statues of Abraham Lincoln =

This list includes prominent and known statues of Abraham Lincoln, the 16th president of the United States who presided during his nation's Civil War.

Image	Statue name	Location	Date	Sculptor	Source
	Abraham Lincoln Statue	Clermont, Iowa Abraham Lincoln Park	1902	George Edwin Bissell	
	Abraham Lincoln: The Head of State	Chicago, Illinois Grant Park	1908	Augustus Saint-Gaudens	
	Abraham Lincoln: The Hoosier Youth	Fort Wayne, Indiana Lincoln National Corporation Headquarters	1932	Paul Manship	
	Abraham Lincoln: The Man	Chicago, Illinois Lincoln Park	1887	Augustus Saint-Gaudens	
	Abraham Lincoln: The Man	London, England Parliament Square	1920	Augustus Saint-Gaudens	
	Abraham Lincoln: The Man	Mexico City, Mexico Parque Lincoln	1964	Augustus Saint-Gaudens	
	Abraham Lincoln: The Man	Cornish, New Hampshire Saint-Gaudens National Historical Park	2016	Augustus Saint-Gaudens	
	The Chicago Lincoln	Chicago, Illinois Lincoln Square	1956	Avard Fairbanks	
	Civil War Monument	Cambridge, Massachusetts Cambridge Common	Monument, 1870; Statue, 1887	Monument, Cyrus Cobb and Darius Cobb; Statue, Augustus Saint-Gaudens	
	Lincoln Monument	Dixon, Illinois President's Park	1930	Leonard Crunelle	
	Emancipation Memorial	Washington, D.C. in Lincoln Park, and 1879 Boston replica	1876	Thomas Ball	
	Lincoln Memorial at Waterfront Park	Louisville, Kentucky Louisville Waterfront Park	2009	Ed Hamilton	
	Lincoln the Lawyer	Urbana, Illinois Carle Park	1927	Lorado Taft	
	Lincoln the Mystic	Jersey City, New Jersey Lincoln Park	1929	James Earle Fraser	
	Lincoln Monument	Wabash, Indiana Wabash County Courthouse	1932	Charles Keck	
	Abraham Lincoln Monument	Ypsilanti, Michigan Lincoln Middle School	1938	Samuel Cashwan	
	Lincoln Monument	Philadelphia, Pennsylvania Fairmount Park	1870	Randolph Rogers	
	Statue of Abraham Lincoln	Washington, D.C. National Mall	1920	Daniel Chester French	
	Statue of Abraham Lincoln	Cincinnati, Ohio Lytle Park	1917	George Grey Barnard	
	Statue of Abraham Lincoln	Hodgenville, Kentucky Hodgenville Public Square	1909	Adolph Alexander Weinman	
	Statue of Abraham Lincoln	Madison, Wisconsin University of Wisconsin–Madison	1909	Adolph Alexander Weinman	
	Statue of Abraham Lincoln	Jefferson, Iowa Greene County Courthouse	1918	William Granville Hastings	
	Statue of Abraham Lincoln	Lincoln, Nebraska Nebraska State Capitol	1912	Daniel Chester French	
	Statue of Abraham Lincoln	Milwaukee, Wisconsin	1934	Gaetano Cecere	
	Statue of Abraham Lincoln	New York City, New York Union Square	1870	Henry Kirke Brown	
	Statue of Abraham Lincoln	Portland, Oregon South Park Blocks	1928	George Fite Waters	
	Statue of Abraham Lincoln	San Francisco, California Civic Center	1926	Haig Patigian	
	Statue of Abraham Lincoln	Washington, D.C. District of Columbia City Hall	1868	Lot Flannery	
	Statue of Abraham Lincoln	Frankfort, Kentucky Kentucky State Capitol	1909	Adolph Alexander Weinman	
	Statue of Abraham Lincoln	Stanville, Kentucky U.S. Route 23	2009		
	Statue of Abraham Lincoln	Washington, D.C. United States Capitol	1871	Vinnie Ream	
	Statue of Abraham Lincoln	Indianapolis, Indiana University Park	1934	Henry Hering	
	Seated Lincoln	Newark, New Jersey Essex County Courthouse	1911	Gutzon Borglum	
	Young Abe Lincoln	Indianapolis, Indiana Indiana Statehouse	1962	David K. Rubins	
	The Young Lincoln	Los Angeles, California Spring Street Courthouse	1941	James Lee Hansen	
	Seated Lincoln and Son	Richmond, Virginia Tredegar Iron Works	2003	David Frech	
		Manchester, UK Albert Square, Manchester	1919	George Gray Barnard	
	Monumento Abraham Lincoln	Tijuana, Baja California, Mexico Roundabout on Paseo de los Héroes	1981	Humberto Peraza Ojeda	
	Lincoln Monument	Oslo, Norway Frogner Park	1914	Paul Fjelde	
	Scottish-American Soldiers Monument	Edinburgh, Scotland Old Calton Burial Ground	1893	George Edwin Bissell	
	Monumento a Abraham Lincoln	Ciudad Juárez, Chihuahua, Mexico Avenida Abraham Lincoln	1965	Angel Terrac	
	Abraham Lincoln shaking hands with Tsar Alexander II	Moscow, Russia Federal Archives	2011	Alexander Bourganov	

== See also ==
- List of sculptures of presidents of the United States
- Mount Rushmore
- Presidential memorials in the United States
