= Abraham Lincoln Monument (Ypsilanti, Michigan) =

Monument in Ypsilanti, United States of America

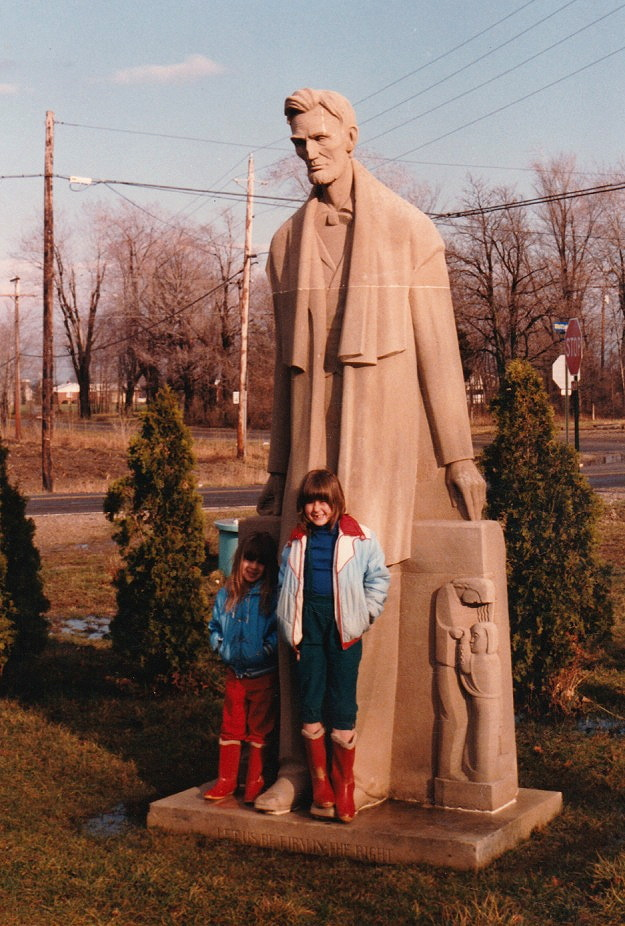

The Abraham Lincoln Memorial is a limestone statue of Abraham Lincoln by Samuel Cashwan located in front of the Lincoln Middle School in the Lincoln Consolidated School District, about six miles (9.7 km) south of Ypsilanti, Michigan.

The figure of Lincoln, larger than life-size (9 feet 8 inches [2.95 m] tall) is bracketed by two smaller groups one leaning on a fasces and the other depicting a figure with broken chains.

The original idea for the statue arose out of a visit by Cashwan, who was employed by the Federal Art Project in Michigan, in the course of a visit to inspect several WPA murals at Lincoln School by the Leon Makielski and his brother, Bronislau. There he proposed that he create the statue if the students at the school would do the work involved in erecting and landscaping the area around where the sculpture would be. Cashwan carved the statue in three parts, the "junior-high boys dug the excavation for the base; the "senior-highs" poured the concrete; all hands joined in the sodding and decorative planting." The work was unveiled on May 4, 1938, the anniversary of Lincoln's burial.

Over the years the statue fared rather badly, Lincoln's face was vandalized and paint was poured over the statue.

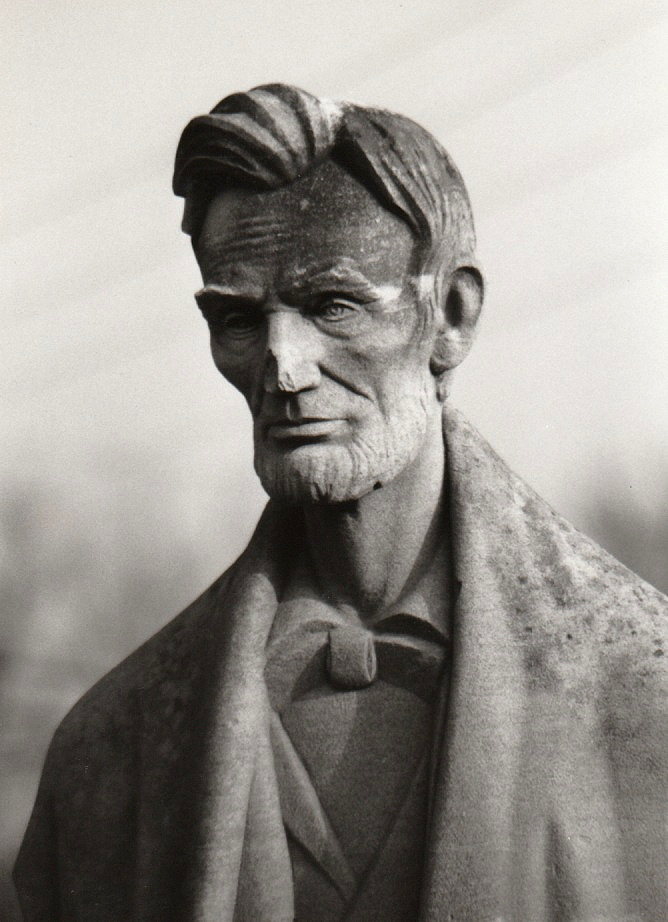
Shows broken nose

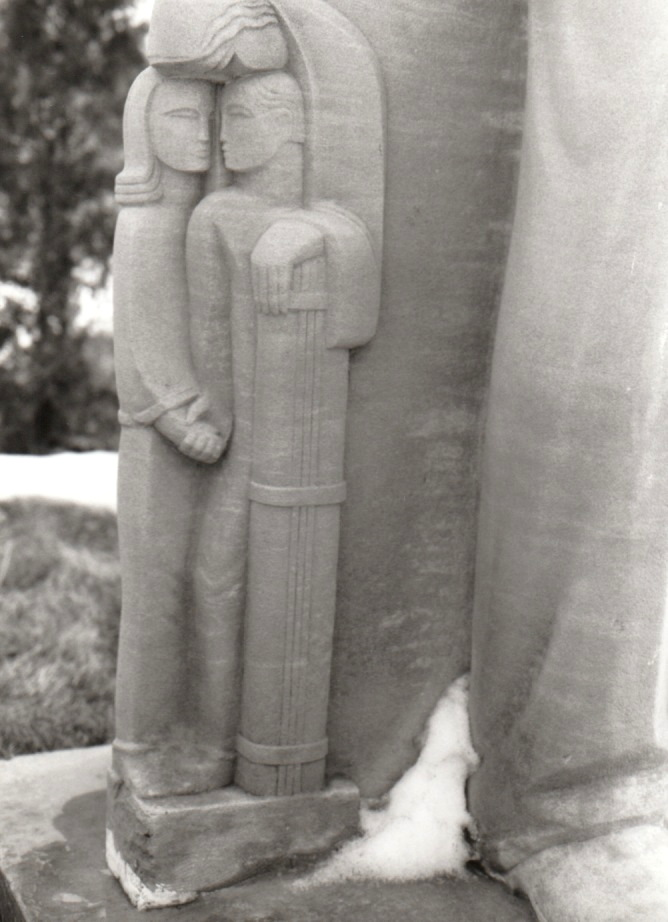
Detail

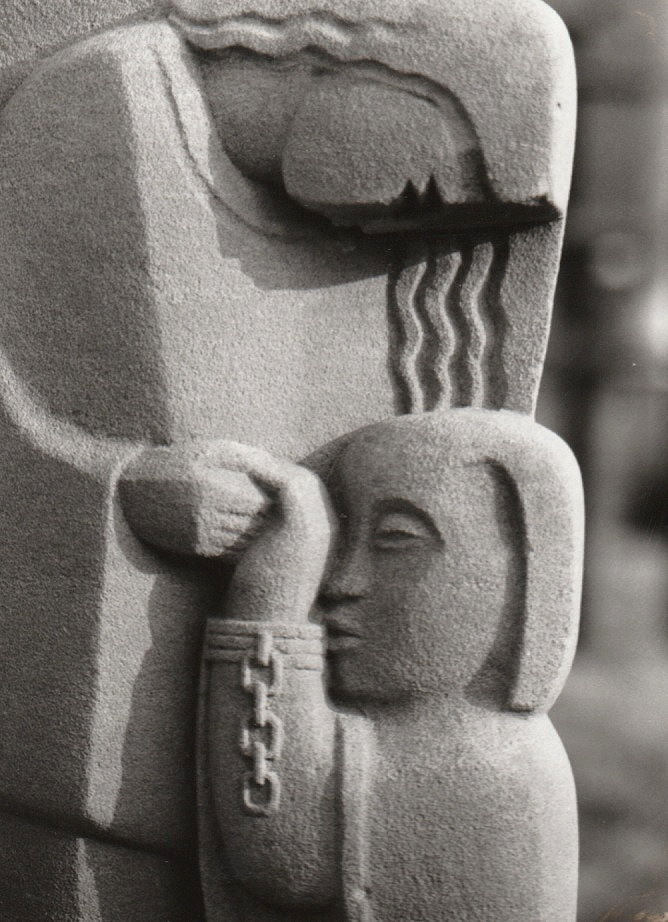
Detail

== See also ==
- List of statues of Abraham Lincoln
- List of sculptures of presidents of the United States
