= Statue of Abraham Lincoln (Lincoln Memorial) =

Sculpture in Washington, D.C.

Abraham Lincoln
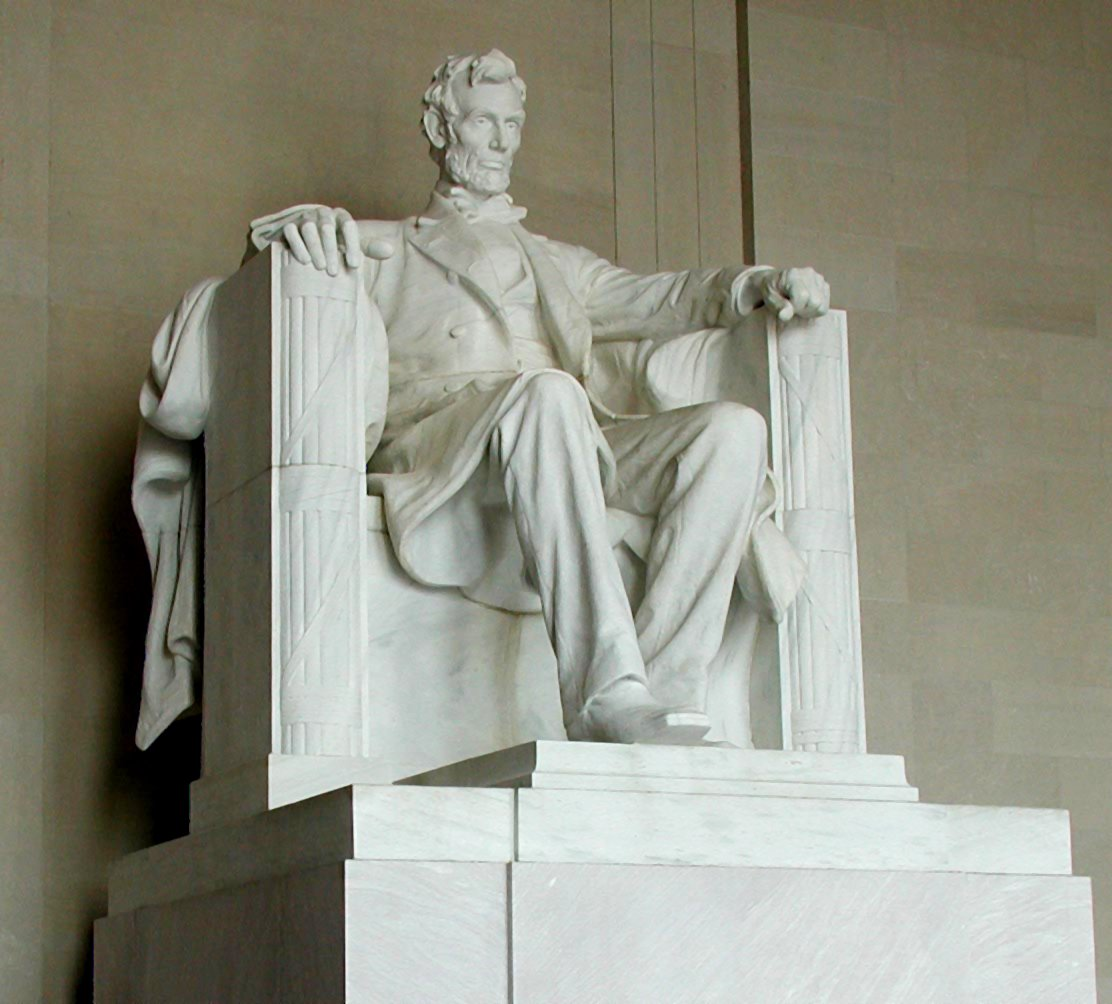
- The statue in August 2002
- Artist: Daniel Chester French
- Year: 1920; 106 years ago
- Type: Georgia marble (Murphy Marble)
- Dimensions: 580 cm (228 in)
- Location: Lincoln Memorial; Washington, D.C., U.S.; 38°53′21.4″N 77°3′0.5″W

Abraham Lincoln (1920) is a colossal seated figure of the 16th president of the United States, Abraham Lincoln (1809–1865), sculpted by Daniel Chester French (1850–1931) and carved by the Piccirilli Brothers. Located in the Lincoln Memorial, constructed between 1914 and 1922 on the National Mall in Washington, D.C., the statue was unveiled in 1922. The work follows in the nation's Beaux Arts and American Renaissance-style architecture traditions.

== Description ==
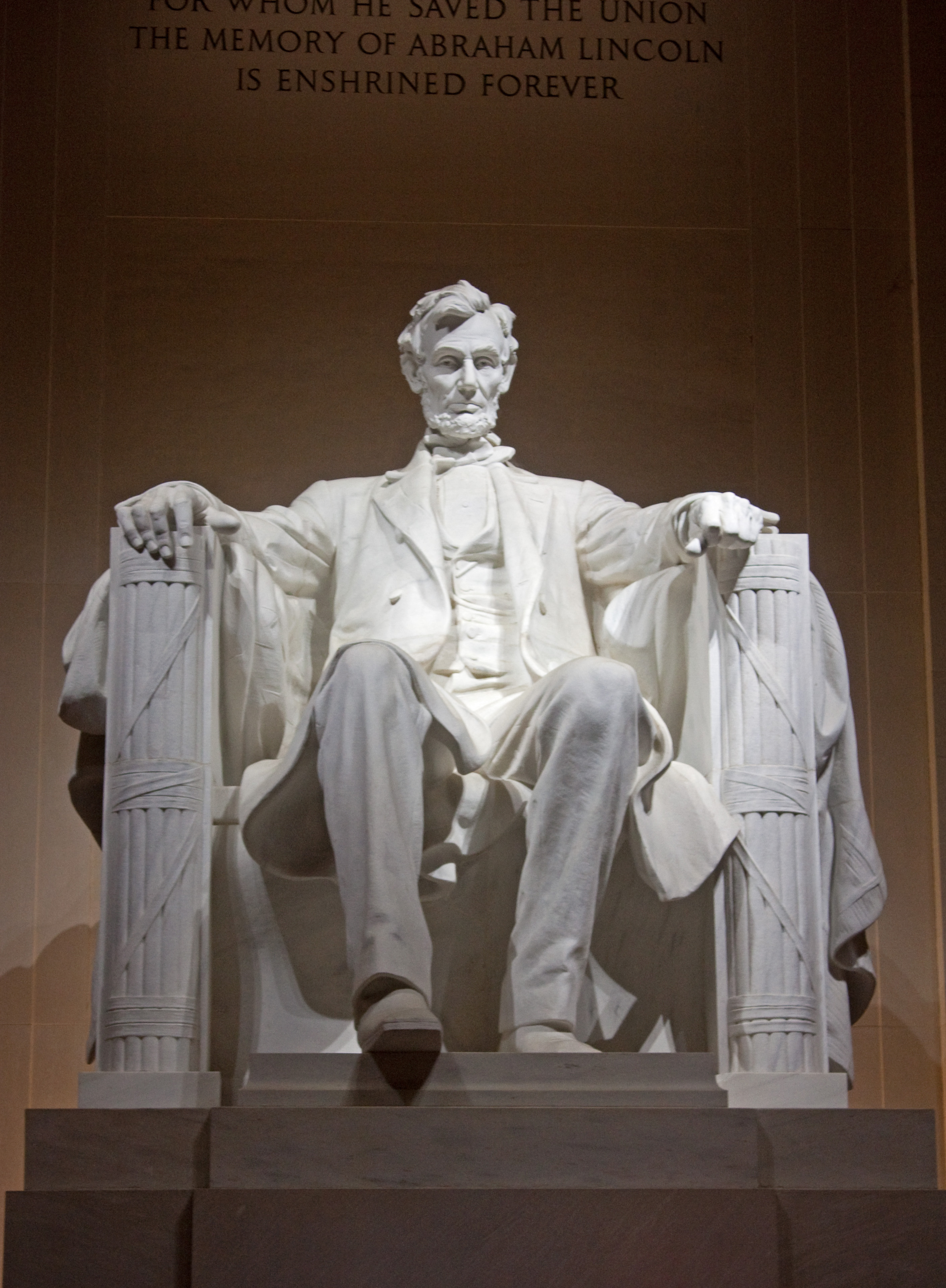
Abraham Lincoln statue, Lincoln Memorial (1920)

The 170-ton statue is composed of 28 blocks of white Georgia marble and rises 30 feet (9.1 m) from the floor, including the 19-foot (5.8 m) seated figure (with armchair and footrest) upon an 11-foot (3.4 m) high pedestal. The figure of Lincoln gazes directly ahead and slightly down with an expression of gravity and solemnity. His frock coat is unbuttoned, and a large United States flag is draped over the chair back and sides. French paid particular attention to Lincoln's expressive hands, which rest on the enormous arms of a semi-circular ceremonial chair, whose fronts bear fasces, emblems of authority from Roman antiquity. French used casts of his own fingers to achieve the correct placement.

== History ==
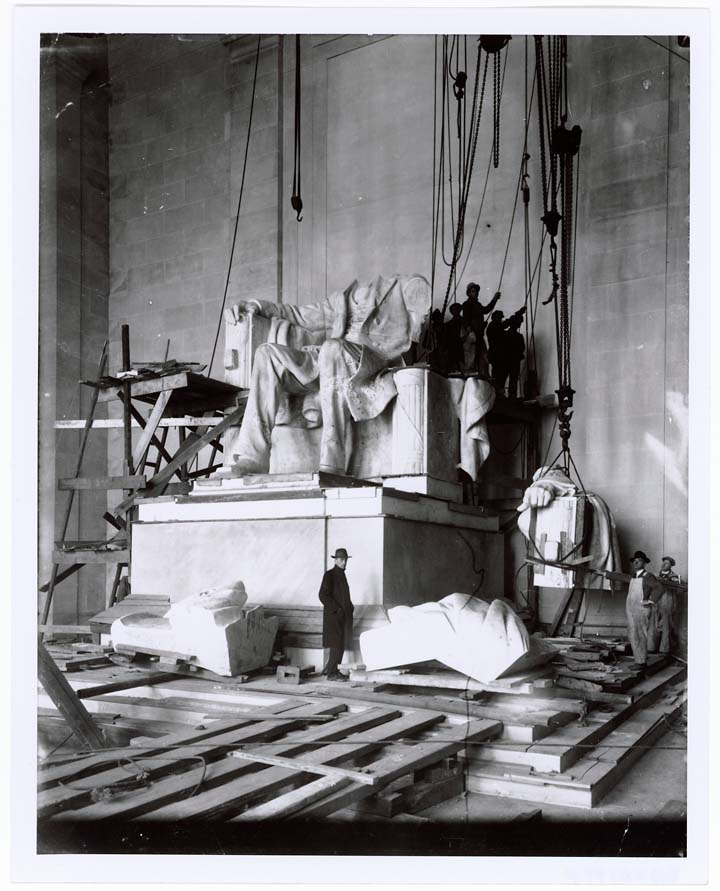
The statue being installed in 1920

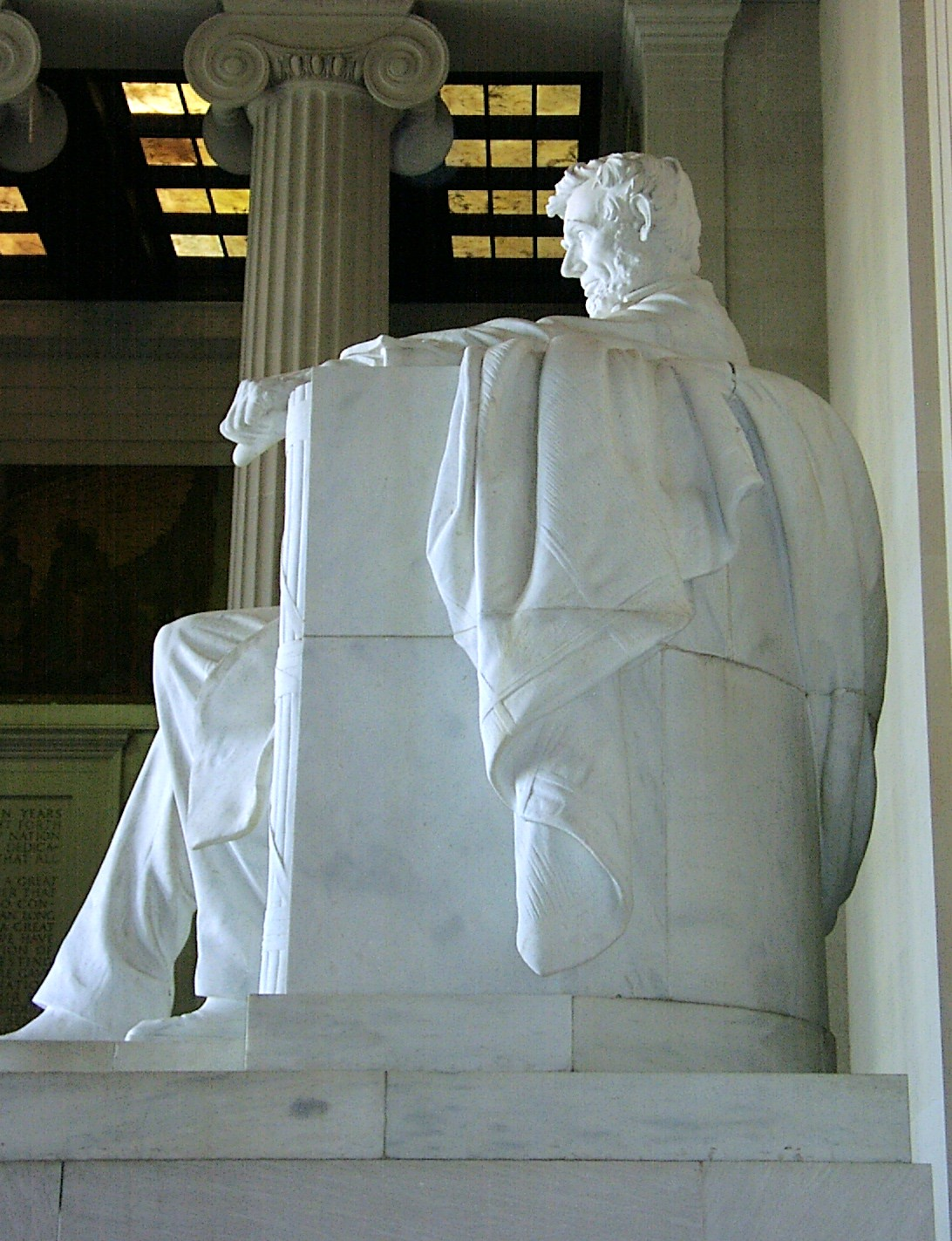
Right side view of the statue

In 1914, Daniel Chester French was selected by the Lincoln Memorial Committee to create a Lincoln statue as part of the memorial to be designed by architect Henry Bacon (1866–1924). French was already famous for his 1874 The Minute Man statue in Concord, Massachusetts, and his 1884 John Harvard statue in Harvard Yard on the campus of Harvard University. He was also the personal choice of Bacon, who had already been collaborating with him for nearly 25 years. French resigned his chairmanship of the Fine Arts Commission in Washington, D.C., a group closely affiliated with the memorial's design and creation — and commenced work in December.

French had already created (1909–1912) a major memorial statue of Lincoln—this one standing—for the Nebraska State Capitol (Abraham Lincoln, 1912) in Lincoln, Nebraska. His previous studies of Lincoln—which included biographies, photographs, and a life mask of Lincoln by Leonard Volk done in 1860—had prepared him for the challenging task of the larger statue. He and Bacon decided that a large seated figure would be most appropriate for the national memorial. French started with a small clay study and subsequently created several plaster models, making subtle changes in the figure's pose or setting. He placed Lincoln not in an ordinary 19th-century seat but in a classical chair, including fasces, a Roman symbol of authority, to convey that the subject was an eminence for all the ages.

Three plaster models of the Lincoln statue are at French's Chesterwood Studio, a National Trust Historic Site in Stockbridge, Massachusetts, including a plaster sketch (1915) and a six-foot plaster model (1916). The second of French's plasters, created at Chesterwood in the summer of 1916 (inscribed October 31), became the basis of the final work, which was initially envisioned as a 12-foot (3.7 m) bronze. In deciding the size of the final statue, French and Bacon took photographic enlargements of the model to the memorial under construction. Eventually, French's longtime collaborators, the firm of Piccirilli Brothers, were commissioned to do the carving of a much larger sculpture in marble from a quarry near Tate, Georgia.

French's design took a year to transfer to the massive marble blocks. French provided finishing strokes in the carvers' studio in The Bronx, New York City and after the statue was assembled in the memorial on the National Mall in 1920. Lighting the statue was a particular problem. In creating the work, French had understood that a large skylight would provide direct, natural illumination from overhead, but this was not included in the final plans. The horizontal light from the east flattened Lincoln's facial features—making him appear to stare blankly rather than wear a dignified expression—and highlighted his shins. French considered this a disaster. In the end, an arrangement of electric lights was devised to correct this situation. The work was unveiled at the memorial's formal dedication on May 30, 1922.

== Legends ==
American manual alphabet

A

L

It is often said that the Lincoln figure is signing his own initials in the American manual alphabet: "A" with his left hand, "L" with his right. The National Park Service is at best ambivalent toward the story, saying, "It takes some imagination to see signs in Lincoln's hands." French had a deaf son and also completed the Gallaudet Memorial which depicted Thomas Hopkins Gallaudet signing in the manual alphabet.

== See also ==
- List of sculptures of presidents of the United States
- List of statues of Abraham Lincoln
- Outdoor sculpture in Washington, D.C.
- Public sculptures by Daniel Chester French
