= Abraham Lincoln: The Hoosier Youth =

Sculpture by Paul Manship

Coordinates: 41.0738°N 85.1398°W

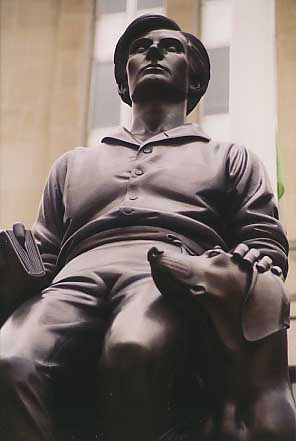
- Artist: Paul Manship
- Year: 16 September 1932
- Type: Bronze, Sculpture
- Location: Fort Wayne, Indiana, U.S.
- Owner: Lincoln National Corporation

Abraham Lincoln, The Hoosier Youth is a heroic bronze sculpture by American artist Paul Manship and was commissioned in 1928 by the Lincoln National Life Insurance Company for its headquarters in Fort Wayne, Indiana. The statue is 12.5 feet (3.8 m) tall and sits atop a pedestal designed by architect Benjamin Wistar Morris and a granite base. The sculpture depicts a youthful Abraham Lincoln during the time he lived in Indiana. The Lincoln figure wears a handmade shirt, buckskin trousers, and boots. He is seated on a tree stump and holds a book. An ax leans against his leg and a dog is seated beside him. Manship also sculpted four bronze allegorical bas reliefs, one for each side of the pedestal, to represent traits associated with Lincoln: Charity, Fortitude, Justice and Patriotism. The statue was dedicated on 16 September 1932.

== Description ==
The Lincoln sculpture is installed between two wings in the forecourt of the Lincoln National Life Insurance Company's former headquarters building in Fort Wayne, Indiana. The heroic bronze statue stands approximately 12.5 feet (3.8 m) tall and depicts Lincoln as a youthful frontiersman with a serious, reflective, and slightly melancholy expression—characteristics used to describe Lincoln's demeanor throughout his life. Lincoln is seated on a tree stump and holds a partially closed book in his proper right hand. An ax leans against his proper right leg. His proper left hand rests on the head of a dog seated beside him. Lincoln wears a homemade linsey-woolsey shirt, buckskin trousers, and boots to emphasize his frontier background. The ax represents Lincoln's youth in Indiana's backwoods, the book symbolizes his intellect, and the dog is a symbol of his love of animals, human empathy, and protectiveness.

Although it is not known if Lincoln had a dog in his youth, Lincoln biographer William Herndon relates a story of Lincoln's refusal to leave a dog behind when the family moved west to Illinois in 1830. According to Herndon, after a stranded dog traveling with the wagon party refused to cross an icy stream, the twenty-one-year-old Lincoln removed his shoes and socks, waded across the chilly water to retrieve the dog, and carried it back in his arms to rejoin the group.

Manship's bronze statue rests on a pedestal designed by Benjamin Wistar Morris, the architect for the Lincoln National building who was also a sculptor. The pedestal is graced with four allegorical reliefs by Manship, one on each side of the pedestal, portraying traits associated with Lincoln: Charity, Fortitude, Justice and Patriotism. These, as well as the main work are executed in the simplified, almost art deco manner that typifies Manship's work. The pedestal sits on a granite base with an overall height of 22 feet (6.7 m).

== Historical information ==
In 1928 the Lincoln National Life Insurance Company commissioned sculptor Paul Manship to produce a statue of Abraham Lincoln for its headquarters in Fort Wayne, Indiana. The company's officers wanted "an outstanding creation of art which would be one of the recognized monuments of the world and which, as such, would attract universal admiration" Benjamin Wistar Morris, the architect for Lincoln National's headquarters in Fort Wayne, recommended Manship for the project.

Manship intended to depict Lincoln as a youthful dreamer and poet rather than an older frontiersman and railsplitter. His first concept paired Lincoln with his mother, Nancy Hanks Lincoln. Manship created four small-scale compositions of Nancy Hanks and Boy Abraham Lincoln, but rejected the mother and son duo in favor of a single figure of Lincoln as a young man. Manship brought a hound dog from Kentucky to his studio in Paris and used it as the model in the Lincoln sculpture. Manship's preliminary sketch was completed and approved in 1929 and he worked on the plaster model in his studios in Paris and New York in 1931. The bronze casting was done at the Compagnie des Bronzes, in Brussels, Belgium, and shipped to the United States, where the statue and four relief medallions were completed in Manship's New York studio during the winter of 1931–32. The sculpture was dedicated in Fort Wayne on 16 September 1932. The plaster model is today kept at the Musée bruxellois des industries et du travail, in Brussels, Belgium, located on the site of the factory of the Compagnie des Bronzes.

A picture of the statue is featured on the dust jacket and the inside front cover of Marks of Lincoln on Our Land.

== Artist ==
Paul Howard Manship (1885–1966), who was born in St. Paul, Minnesota, was an experienced sculptor with an international reputation when he received the commission for the Lincoln sculpture in 1928. Manship familiarized himself with Lincoln's youth by touring the areas where Lincoln lived in Kentucky and Indiana to prepare for the project; there were no photographs taken of Lincoln until he was 37 years of age. Manship also consulted with Lincoln scholars and biographers: Louis Warren, who was a director at Lincoln National, Carl Sandburg, and Ida Tarbell, among others. Manship received $75,000 for the Lincoln statue, an "astonishing" amount considering it was completed in 1932 in the midst of the Great Depression.

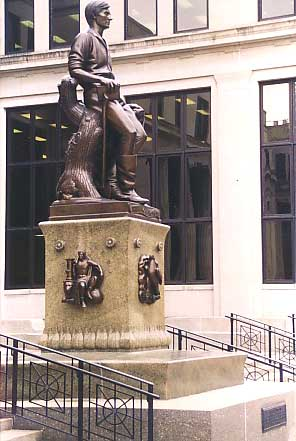

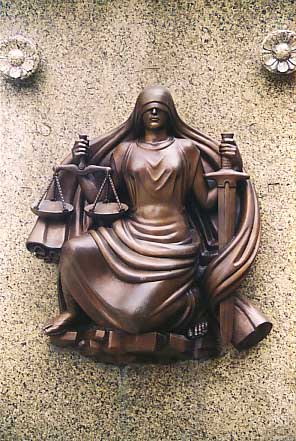
Justice

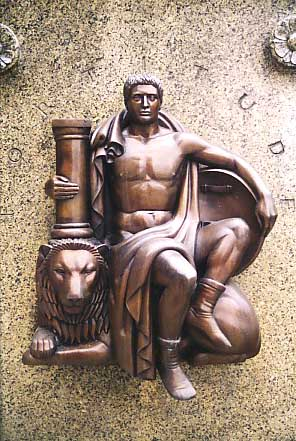
Fortitude

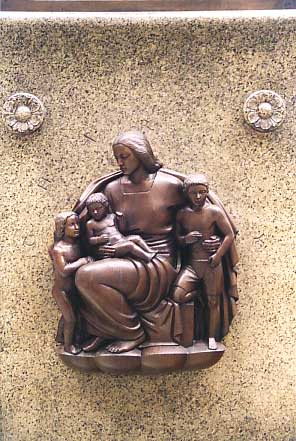
Charity

== See also ==
- List of statues of Abraham Lincoln
- List of sculptures of presidents of the United States
