= Abraham Lincoln Statue and Park =

- U.S. National Register of Historic Places
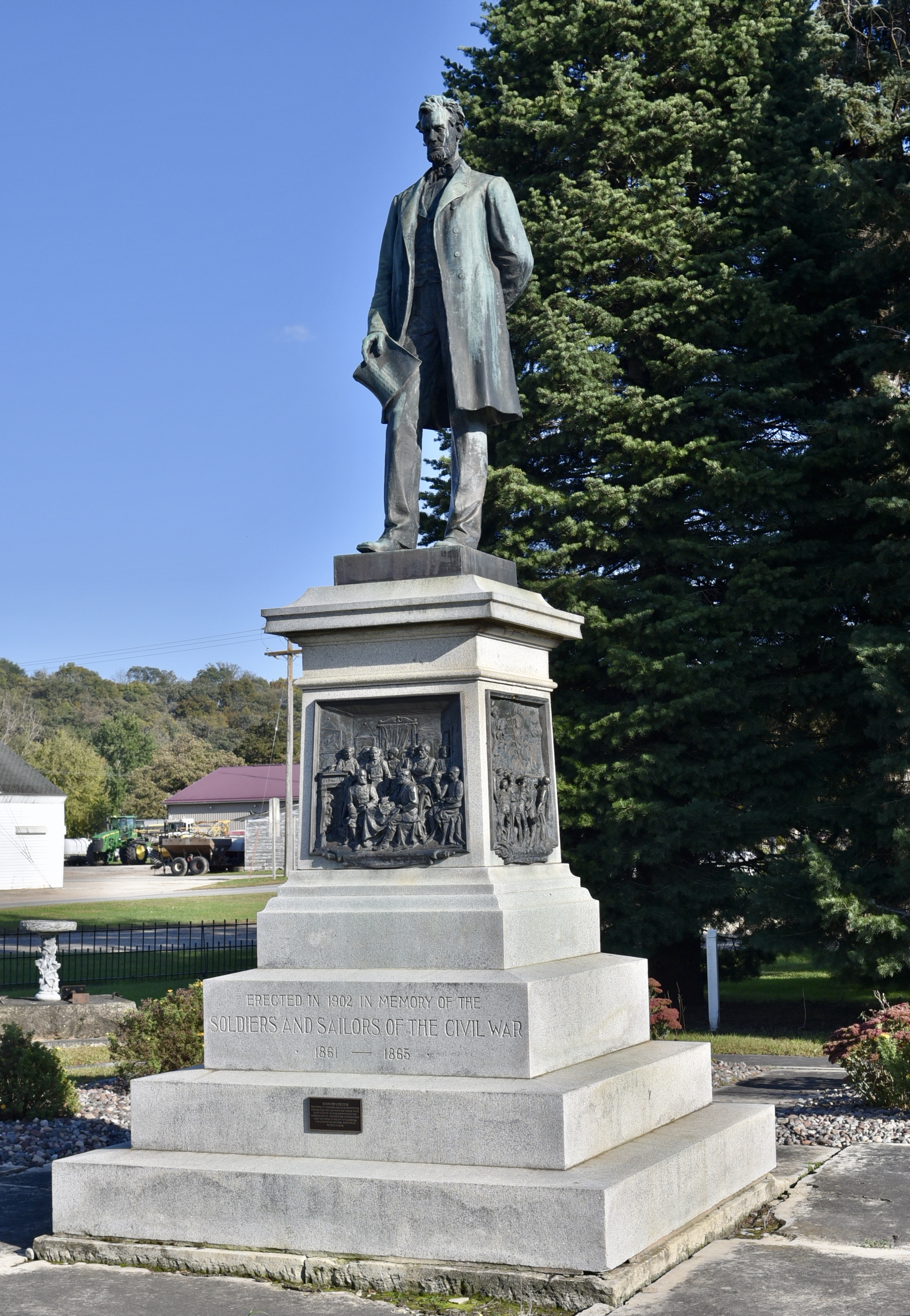

- Location within Iowa Location within the United States
- Location: Junction of Mill and Stone, Clermont, Iowa
- Coordinates: 43°0′13″N 91°39′53″W
- Built: 1902
- Architect: George Edwin Bissell
- NRHP reference No.: 00001197
- Added to NRHP: December 14, 2016

Abraham Lincoln Statue and Park is a historic property located in Clermont, Iowa, United States. The statue was erected in 1902, and the property was listed on the National Register of Historic Places in 2000. It is also referred to as the Bissell Statue after the artist who created it, George Edwin Bissell. The statue is a duplicate of a statue of Lincoln that was erected in Edinburgh, Scotland. The following inscription is on the statue's granite base: "Erected in 1902 in memory of soldiers and sailors of the Civil War, 1861-1865."

The statue was dedicated June 19, 1903.

== See also ==
- List of statues of Abraham Lincoln
- List of sculptures of presidents of the United States
