= Statue of Abraham Lincoln (Lincoln, Nebraska) =

Statue in Lincoln, Nebraska by Daniel Chester French

Abraham Lincoln
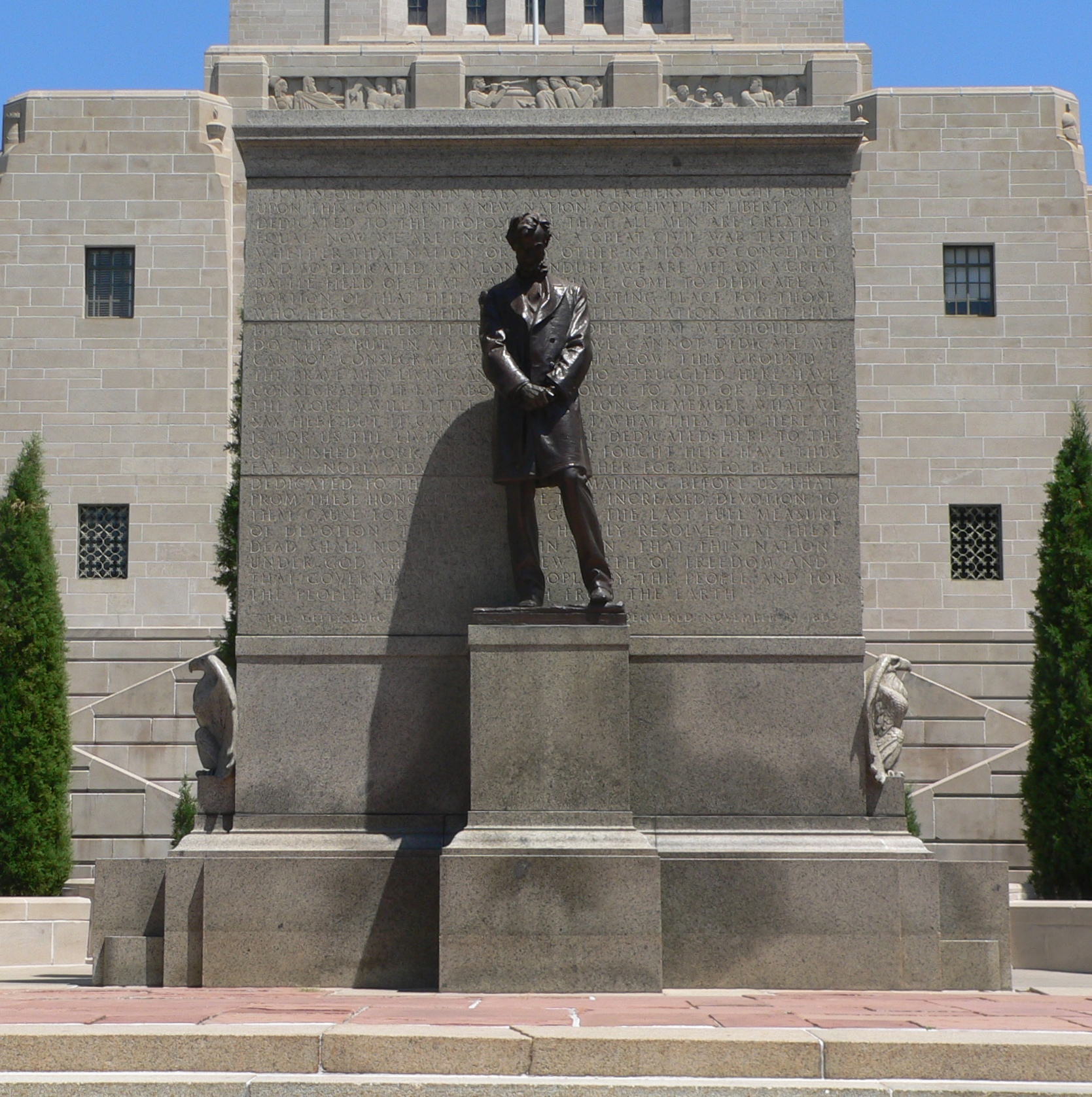
- 40.80806°N 96.70088°W
- Location: Lincoln, Nebraska, U.S.
- Designer: Daniel Chester French
- Material: Bronze sculpture
- Opening date: 1912

Abraham Lincoln – also known as The Gettysburg Lincoln – is a bronze statue of President Abraham Lincoln by Daniel Chester French, located on the grounds of the Nebraska State Capitol. The monument was commissioned by the Abraham Lincoln Memorial Association of Lincoln, Nebraska, and produced in 1912.

The statue was cast in bronze by Jno. Williams, Inc. of New York. Its architectural setting was created by French's longtime collaborator Henry Bacon. The 8.67 ft (2.64 m) statue stands upon a 6 ft (1.83 m) granite base and before a 20 ft (6.1 m) granite stele, on which is inscribed the text of Lincoln's Gettysburg Address.

French later used much of his research for this statue – consisting largely of studying Mathew Brady's photographs of Lincoln and obtaining a copy of Leonard Volk's plaster life cast of the president – in the creation of his most famous work: the Lincoln statue (1920) at the Lincoln Memorial in Washington, D.C.

== See also ==
- List of statues of Abraham Lincoln
- List of sculptures of presidents of the United States
- Public sculptures by Daniel Chester French
