= Abraham Lincoln: The Man =

Statue of Abraham Lincoln standing by Augustus Saint-Gaudens

Coordinates: 41.91263°N 87.63026°W

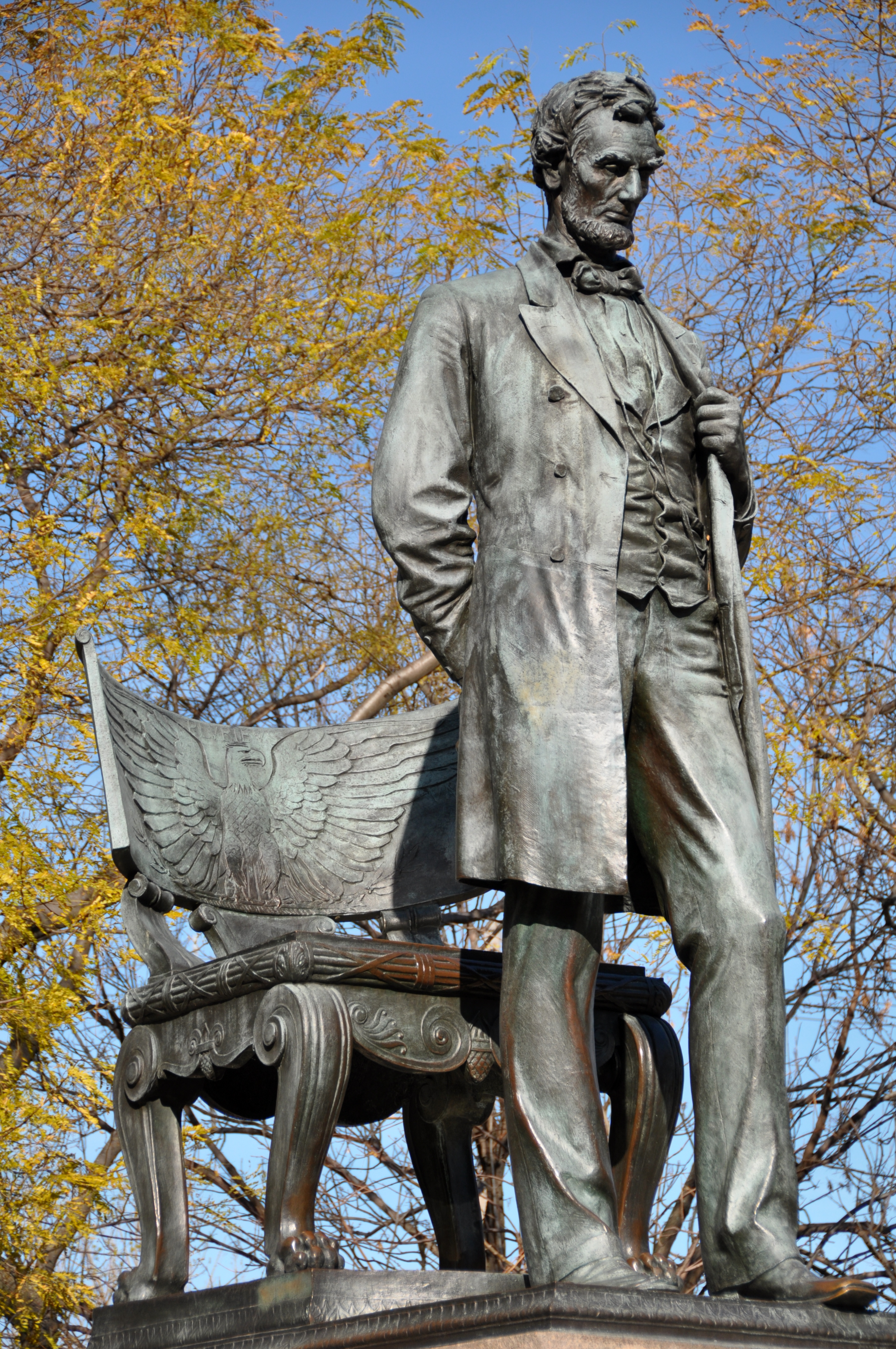
Abraham Lincoln: The Man, by Augustus Saint-Gaudens (1887), Lincoln Park, Chicago

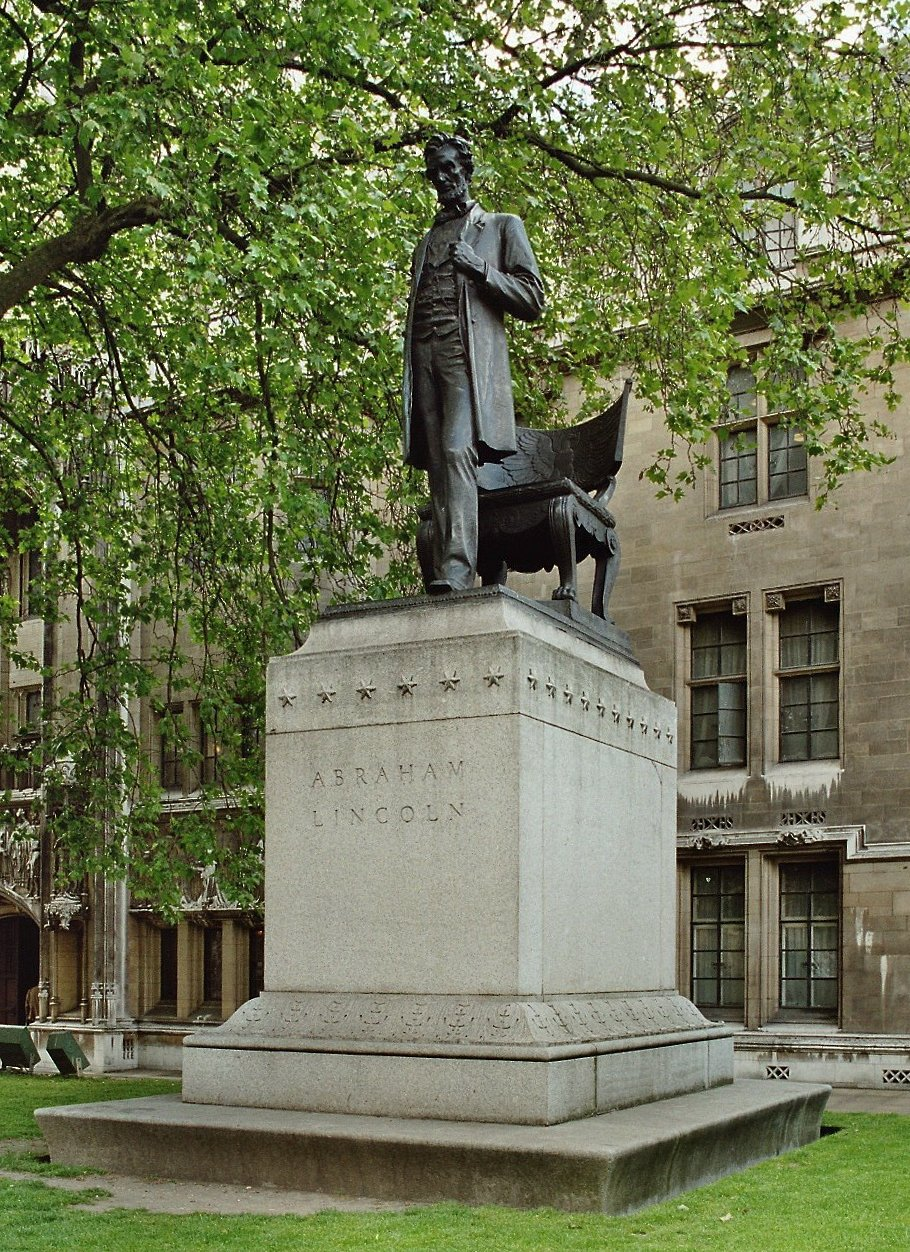
Diplomatic gift recasting of the statue (c. 1920) in Parliament Square, London

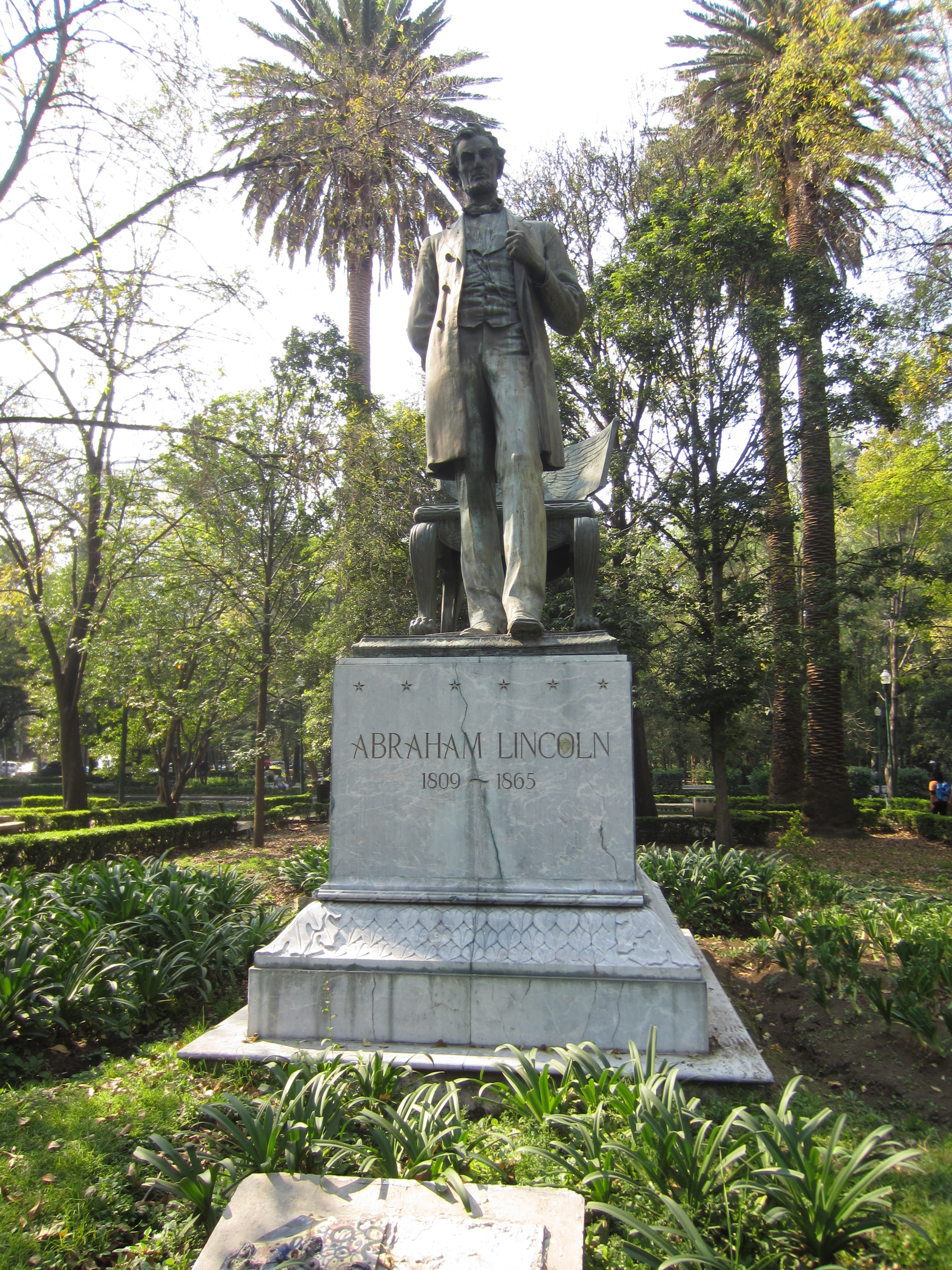
Diplomatic gift recasting of the statue (c. 1964) in Parque Lincoln, Mexico City

Abraham Lincoln: The Man (also called Standing Lincoln) is a larger-than-life size 12-foot (3.7 m) bronze statue of Abraham Lincoln, the 16th president of the United States. The original statue is in Lincoln Park in Chicago, and later re-castings of the statue have been given as diplomatic gifts from the United States to the United Kingdom, and to Mexico.

Completed by Augustus Saint-Gaudens in 1887, it has been described as the most important sculpture of Lincoln from the 19th century. At the time, the New York Evening Post called it "the most important achievement American sculpture has yet produced". Abraham Lincoln II, Lincoln's only grandson, was present, among a crowd of 10,000, at the initial unveiling. The artist later created the Abraham Lincoln: The Head of State ('Seated Lincoln') sculpture in Chicago's Grant Park.

== Design ==
The sculpture depicts a contemplative Lincoln rising from a chair of state, (Note: Lincoln's chair-of-state is adorned with an eagle in relief and the motto e pluribus unum. The chair's composition was informed by the ancient Greek Throne of the Priest (c. 330 BCE) from the Theater of Dionysos in Athens.) about to give a speech. It is set upon a pedestal and, in Chicago, an exedra designed by architect Stanford White. White's setting includes carved and bronze caste excerpts of Lincoln's writings. (Note: The statue's "'profound solemnity' was later reinforced as Saint-Gaudens, on the recommendation of his close friend and critical advocate Richard Watson Gilder, poet and editor of The Century Magazine, studied Lincoln's speeches and writings in preparation for the commission. Excerpts from the Cooper Union speech (February 27, 1860) and second inaugural address (March 4, 1865) were carved into the accompanying sixty-foot-long exedra, while bronze cannonballs flanking the steps have extracts from the Gettysburg Address (November 19, 1863) and a letter written to Horace Greeley (August 22, 1862), editor of the New-York Daily Tribune.") Chicago businessman Eli Bates (1806–1881) provided $40,000 in his will for the statue. Saint-Gaudens was specially selected for the commission after a design competition failed to produce a winning artist. (Note: At the same time, Saint Gaudens was also commissioned to create the Eli Bates Fountain, Storks at Play near the Lincoln Park Conservatory, assisted by Frederick MacMonnies) Saint-Gaudens, who revered the President, had seen Lincoln at the time of his inauguration, and later viewed Lincoln's body lying in state. For his design, the artist also relied on a life mask and hand casts made of Lincoln in 1860 by Leonard W. Volk. While planning and working on the Standing Lincoln, Saint-Gaudens was first enticed to what would become his home and studio, and an associated artist's colony. To convince him to vacation near Cornish, New Hampshire, a friend told him the area had "many Lincoln-shaped men".

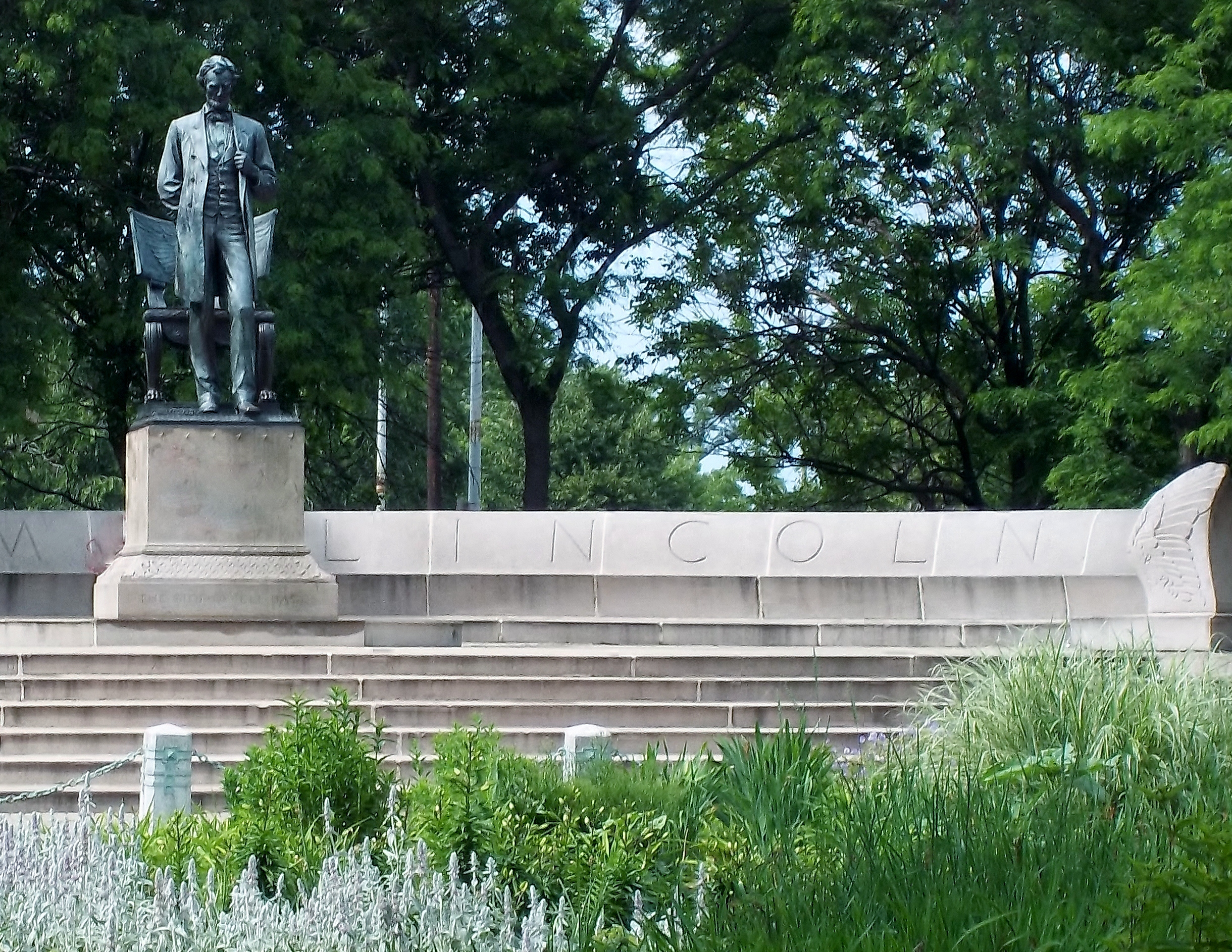
A Stanford White designed exedra (semicircular platform with bench) frames Saint Gaudens' original statue

== Reception and legacy ==
The sculpture's "combination of a natural-looking Lincoln ... with a Classical-style architectural setting" influenced a generation of sculptors. One sculptor Standing Lincoln significantly influenced was Daniel Chester French, who would go on to create the Lincoln statue at the Lincoln Memorial in 1920. The monument was also a favorite of Hull House founder Jane Addams, who once wrote, "I walked the wearisome way from Hull-House to Lincoln Park ... in order to look at and gain magnanimous counsel from the statue." Journalist Andrew Ferguson discusses the statue at length in his book Land of Lincoln, writing that the statue presents "a sort of world-weariness that seems almost kind". The City of Chicago awarded the monument landmark status on December 12, 2001. It is located near the Chicago History Museum and North Avenue. The Lincoln Park Conservancy restored the statue in 1989. The sculpture and exedra were restored again in 2026 and unveiled by the Conservancy and Chicago Park District on 4 July.

== Replicas ==
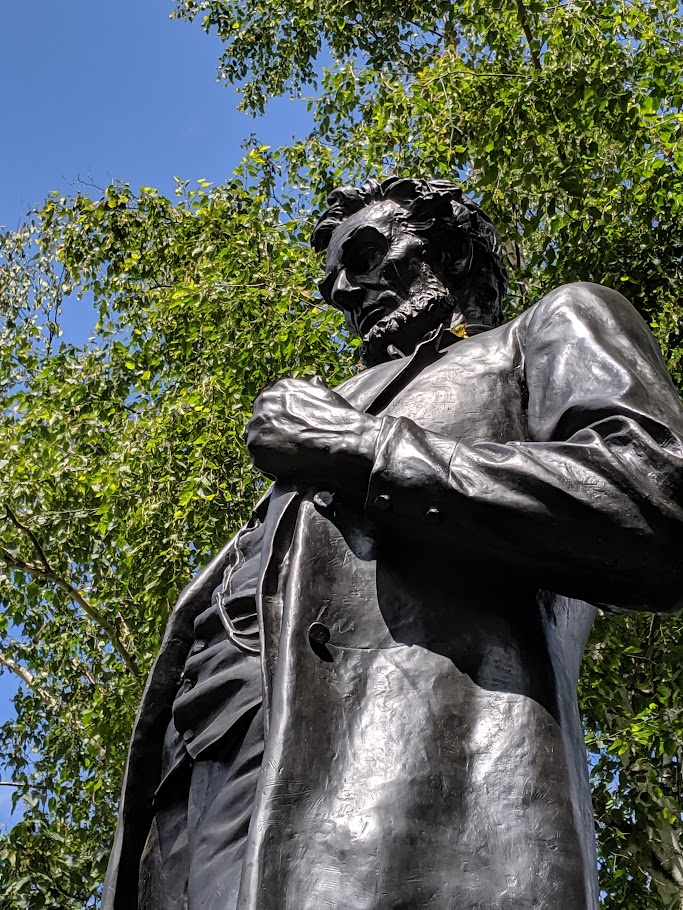
Reproduction in Cornish, NH

Specially cast replicas of the statue, reusing the original reconditioned molds, stand at Parliament Square in London, Parque Lincoln in Mexico City, and at the Saint-Gaudens National Historical Park in Cornish, New Hampshire.

- The Parliament Square statue was given to the United Kingdom in July 1920. The American Ambassador made a formal presentation at Central Hall, Westminster, where Prime Minister David Lloyd George accepted the gift on behalf of the people of Britain; after a procession to Parliament Square, the statue was unveiled by Prince Arthur, Duke of Connaught.

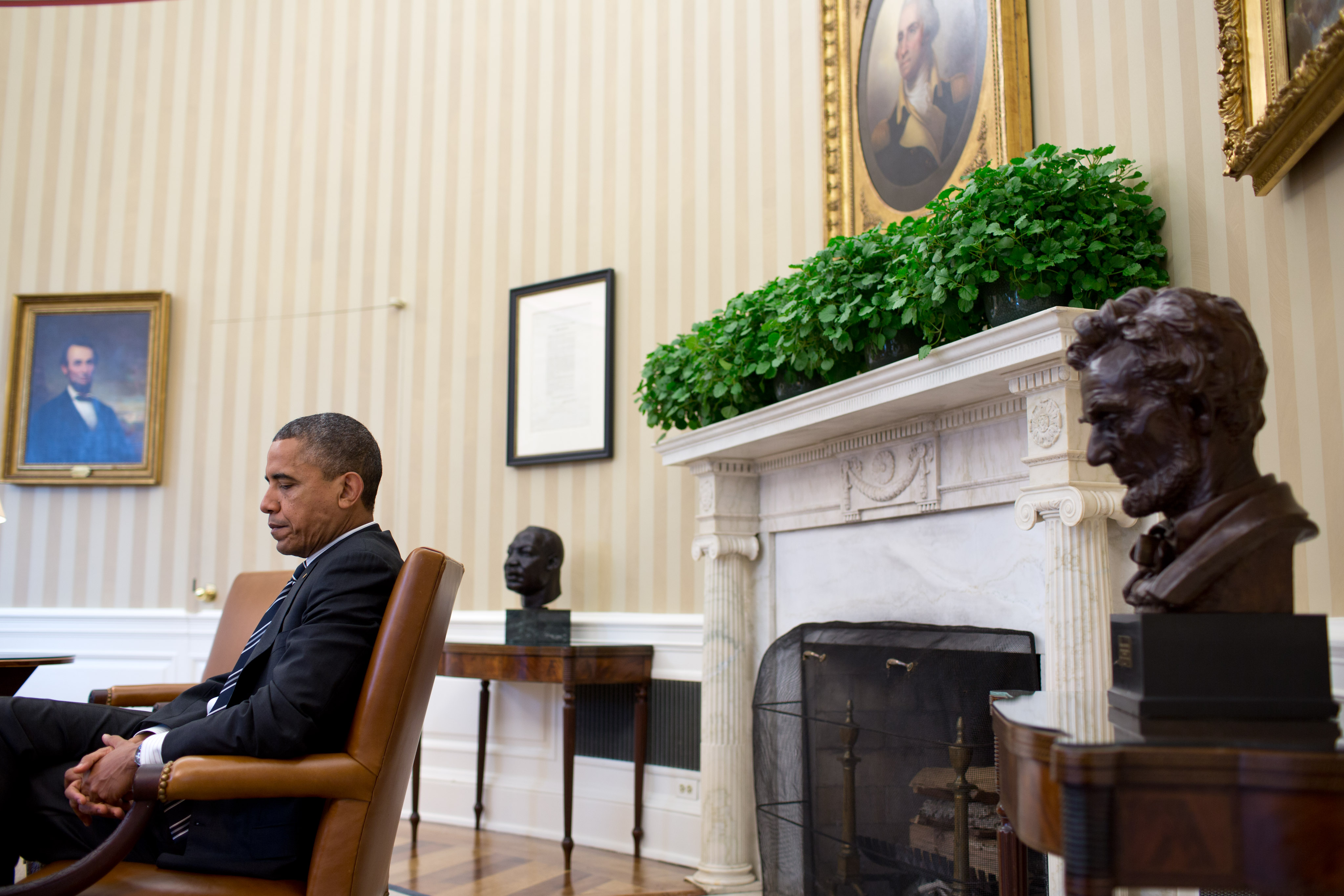
Smaller-sized bust copy from the statue in the Oval Office. (President Obama is seated to the left)

- The Mexico City statue was presented by United States President Lyndon Johnson to the people of Mexico in 1964. Later, Johnson received a small copy of the bust from the statue, which since then is often seen displayed in the Oval Office of the White House.
- In 2016, a newly cast replica of the full-height statue was installed in the garden at Saint-Gaudens National Historic Site in Cornish.

=== Reductions ===
From 1910 onwards, Saint-Gaudens' widow, Augusta, oversaw the casting of a number of smaller replicas of the statue, reduced to slightly under one-third the size of the original.

- Metropolitan Museum of Art, New York: first cast – sold to Clara Stone Hay, 1911, previously on display in Washington. The sculpture belonged to the family of Lincoln's White House aide John Hay.
- Yale University Art Gallery, New Haven: second cast – gift of Allison Armour, 1937, originally purchased by George Armour
- Harvard Art Museums: third cast – purchased from Doll & Richards, Boston, by Grenville L. Winthrop, 1912
- Hotchkiss School: donated by Homer Sawyer, possibly in 1939–40
- Carnegie Museum of Art, Pittsburgh: gift of Charles Rosenbloom, 1943
- Chazy School District, New York: purchased 1923 by William H. Miner
- Detroit Institute of Art: donated by Mrs Walter O. Briggs, 1952
- Forest Lawn Memorial Park, Hollywood Hills: cast in 1940 by Gorham
- Greenfield Village and Henry Ford Museum, Dearborn, Michigan: gift of the Ford Motor Company
- Carnegie Library, Jackson District Library, Jackson, Michigan: gift, 1915
- Lincoln Memorial University Library, Harrogate, Tennessee: donated by Sarah Lynn in memory of her husband, John Lynn, in 1938
- Lincoln Tomb, Springfield, Illinois
- Newark Museum, Newark, New Jersey: gift of Franklin Murphy, 1920
- Saint-Gaudens Memorial, Cornish, New Hampshire: donated by Augusta Saint-Gaudens, 1919
- Fay School, Southborough, Massachusetts
- Abraham Lincoln School of Languages, Havana, Cuba

== See also ==
- List of public art in Chicago
- List of public art in Mexico City
- List of statues of Abraham Lincoln
- List of sculptures of presidents of the United States
