= The Chicago Lincoln =

Statue of Abraham Lincoln

- 'Beardless Lincoln'
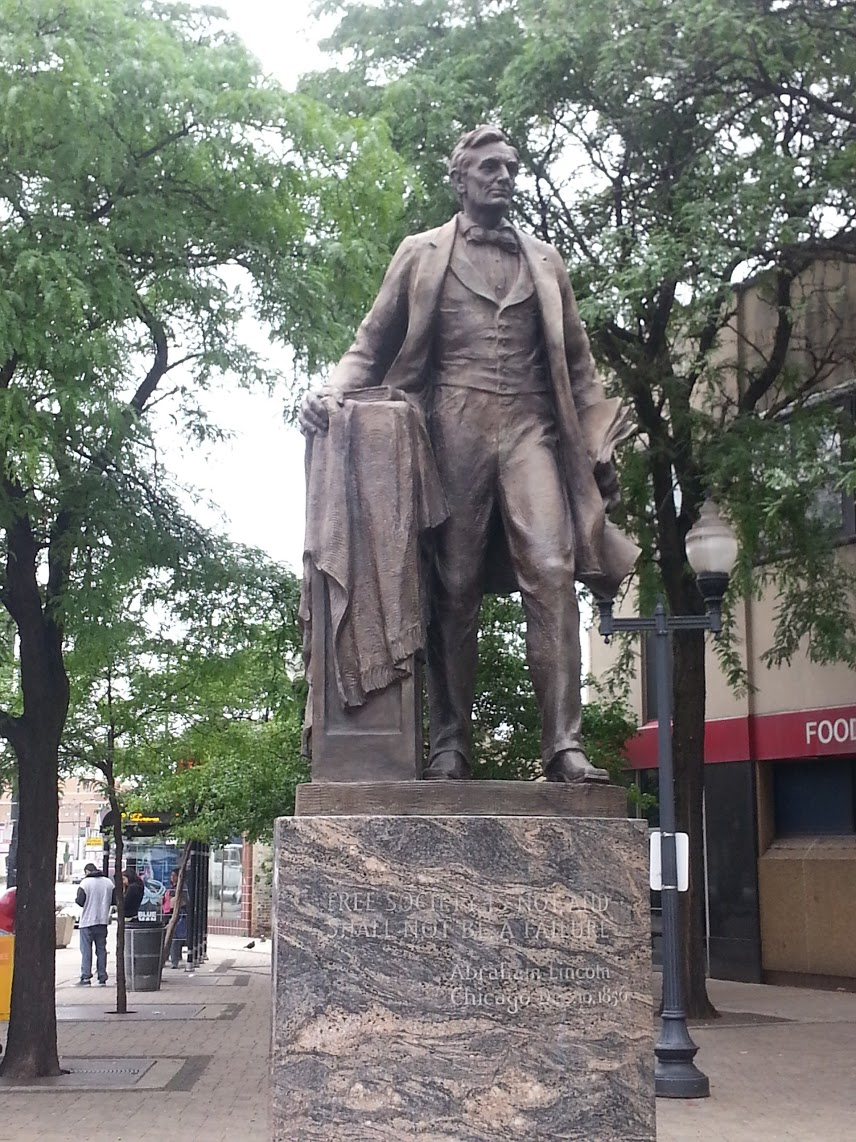
- Artist: Avard Fairbanks
- Year: 1956
- Medium: Bronze sculpture with a polished pink granite base
- Dimensions: 400 cm × 150 cm × 170 cm (156 in × 58 in × 68 in)
- Location: Lincoln Square; Chicago; 41.968756°N 87.688666°W

The Chicago Lincoln is a statue of a standing, beardless Abraham Lincoln in Lincoln Square, Chicago. The statue was designed by Lloyd Ostendorf for a city contest and modeled by sculptor Avard Fairbanks. The statue was erected on October 16, 1956.

== Description ==
The statue displays Lincoln as he appeared when visiting Chicago for various speeches and events such as the River and Harbor Convention or when meeting Vice President-elect Hannibal Hamlin to discuss the organization of his Cabinet. The sculpture of Lincoln is intended to symbolize liberty, and shows Lincoln holding a set of books and his stovepipe hat in his left hand while his right hand is resting on a podium. On the pedestal's southern face, the inscription reads:

FREE SOCIETY IS NOT, AND
SHALL NOT BE A FAILURE.
Abraham Lincoln
Chicago Dec. 10, 1856

The bronze sculpture is a larger-than-life representation of Lincoln; its height measures to 7 feet 6 inches (229 cm) compared to Lincoln's reported height of 6 feet 4 inches (193 cm).

The quotation is from a speech given by Lincoln at a Republican banquet in Chicago in the aftermath of the 1856 presidential election, in which the Republican candidate (John C. Frémont) was defeated by the pro-slavery Democrat James Buchanan.

== History ==
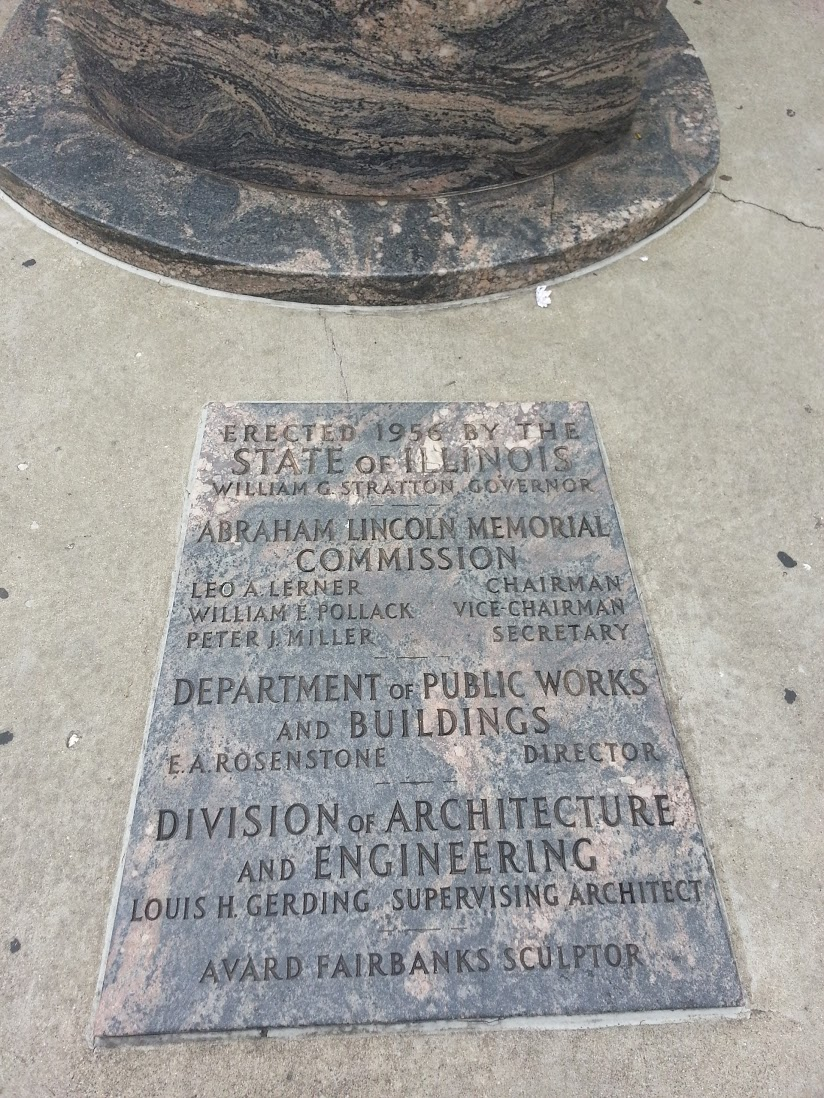
Base plate description of The Chicago Lincoln

The idea for a statue was first proposed by Alderman John Hoellen in 1951 as a memorial to Abraham Lincoln. This proposal was later submitted as a bill to the Illinois General Assembly and signed by Governor William Stratton. The proposal created a committee to plan how the structure was to be created. The committee decided to organize a nationwide contest, allowing individuals to submit designs and ideas for the new statue. A collector of Lincoln images, Lloyd Ostendorf, was declared the winner; Ostendorf won a $500 prize for his submitted sketch of Lincoln without his beard and standing up. The statue was sculpted by Avard Fairbanks at a cost of $35,000.

The statue was originally placed in the street at the intersections of Lincoln, Lawrence, and Western Avenues in a triangular traffic island. However, the three-street intersection coupled with its heavy traffic load and the statue's presence was problematic, and made it among Chicago's three most dangerous intersections: in 1975 alone, the intersection accounted for 109 automobile accidents. Late in 1978 or early in 1979, the statue was moved approximately 50 feet east to its present location, which is at, but no longer in, the redesigned intersection of Lawrence and Western Avenues: it now sits in front of a local Walgreens.

In 1992, the statue was considered to be urgently in need of treatment after an assessment from the Smithsonian Institution. It was later treated and restored in 1996 to celebrate the 40th anniversary of its unveiling.

== Construction ==
Fairbanks, the sculptor, reported that he initially created a sketch followed by small, clay model of the statue before starting on the full-size statue. The clay used on the final statue originated from Illinois. To prepare the full-size statue, an armature using wood, wire mesh, and an iron rod was constructed to keep the statue upright while it was being created. Fairbanks built the statue anatomically (nude) at first, and then moved to add clothing and worked on the extremities toward the end of his work. The podium in the statue was planned based on Fairbanks' review of common photographs of Lincoln during his presidential campaign.

== See also ==
- List of public art in Chicago
- List of statues of Abraham Lincoln
- List of sculptures of presidents of the United States
