= Lincoln Monument (Dixon, Illinois) =

Sculpture by Leonard Crunelle

Coordinates: 41°50′47.5″N 89°29′6.27″W

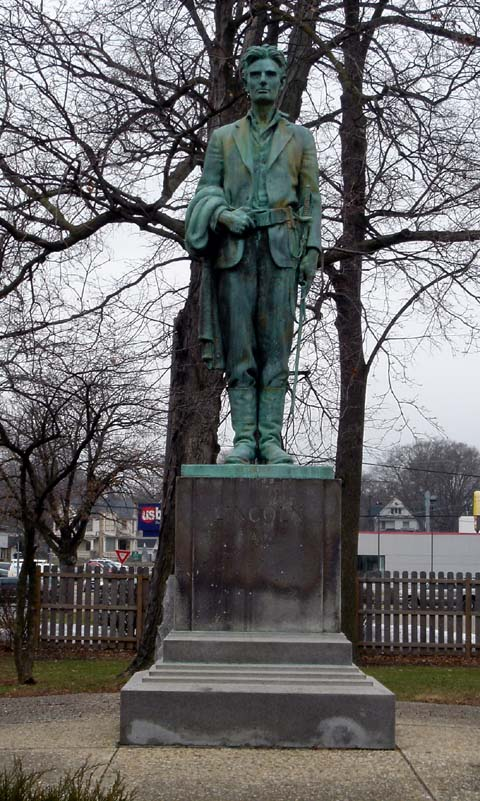
- Artist: Leonard Crunelle
- Year: 1930
- Type: Bronze
- Dimensions: 300 cm × 61 cm × 46 cm (10 ft × 2 ft × 1.5 ft)
- Location: Dixon, Illinois, United States
- Owner: Dixon Historical Society

The Lincoln Monument is a bronze statue of Abraham Lincoln that commemorates his 1832 service in the Black Hawk War. Located in President's Park in Dixon, Illinois, the bronze statue was sculpted by Leonard Crunelle and was dedicated on September 24, 1930. The memorial is maintained by the Illinois Historic Preservation Agency as a state historic site.

The inscription reads:
(On back of base, north side under relief of John Dixon:)
JOHN DIXON
FOUNDER OF THE CITY OF DIXON
APRIL 11, 1830 - PROPRIETOR
OF THE FERRY AND TAVERN HERE
DURING THE BLACK HAWK WAR
(Under relief of Ft. Dixon:)
FORT DIXON IN 1832
(Under relief of a tavern, wagon, and boat:)
DIXON TAVERN AND FERRY 1830
(Front of base:)
LINCOLN

== See also ==
- Lincoln Tomb
- List of statues of Abraham Lincoln
- List of sculptures of presidents of the United States
