= Samuel Cashwan =

American sculptor (1900–1988)

Samuel Cashwan, 1942

Samuel Adolph Cashwan (1900–1988) was an American sculptor.

== History ==
Born Samual Adolf Cashwan to Jewish parents in Cherkasy, Ukraine, Cashwan's parents left Russia and emigrated to New York City in 1906. Cashwan began his art studies after the family moved to Detroit in 1916. His first exposure to art came from his art teacher, Katherine Conover at Detroit's Central High School. Cashwan then took art course at the John Wicker School of Art in Detroit and later at Detroit City College.

In 1918, Cashwan served in the US Army. He was discharged following the end of World War I and returned to New York City, where he continued with his art training at the Architectural League of New York. Cashwan then moved to Paris from 1923 to 1926 where he attended the École des Beaux-Arts under the sculptor Antoine Bourdelle. He returned to Detroit in 1927 and became an art instructor at the University of Michigan. Cashwan also served as the head of the sculpture department of the Detroit Society of Arts and Crafts until 1942. Cashwan was also employed by the Works Progress Administration (WPA) from 1936 until 1942 as the supervisor of its sculpture and ceramics program. He was to credit the income from these teaching positions to allow art to his own tastes rather than that of the art market.

During his time at the WPA, Cashwan created several sculptures for outside display at Michigan State University. At the Olin Health Center, he created bas-reliefs of the Greek gods Panacea and Hygeia. At one of the university entrances, he created a sculpture of a man, a woman, a horse and several sheafs of wheat. These figures symbolized the university's beginnings as a school of agriculture.

In January, 1942, Cashwan exhibited sculptural work at an opening of the Museum of Modern Art in New York City.

Following the end of World War II, Cashwan was hired as a designer for General Motors, a position that he held until his retirement in 1965. He moved to North Carolina shortly thereafter, where he lived until his death in 1988.

Cashwan created two prominent sculptures at the 1966 Oldsmobile Administrative Building in Lansing, Michigan: Prometheus in the building's lobby and Open Cage at an important entrance. The Prometheus sculpture signified the spirit of research necessary to industrial progress, and Open Cage signified people working in groups.

While Cashwan suggested that his work had been influenced by both Romanesque and Hindu sculpture, as his career progress his work developed along more and more abstract lines. By the late 1930s, his figural work had become very angular, stressing sharp lines and large volumes. His pieces created following World War II were even more abstract, his later ones having altogether abandoned figural reference.

Like many of the sculptors of his day Cashwan was endowed with both the skills and the opportunity to work with architects and create architectural sculpture. Buildings adorned by his hand can be found in both Lansing, Michigan and Detroit.

== Architectural work ==
- St. Aloysius Church, Donaldson & Meier architects, Detroit, Michigan - two Angles on facade 1927
- Water Conditioning Plant, Black & Black architects, Lansing, Michigan, 1938
- Olin Health Center, Ralph Calder, architect, Michigan State University, East Lansing, Michigan, 1939
- Abbott Street Entrance Marker, Michigan State University, East Lansing, Michigan 1939
- Edward Denby Memorial, Brodhead Armory, Detroit MI, 1939
- Music Building, Ralph Calder, architect, Michigan State University, East Lansing, Michigan 1940
- Student Union Addition, Prometheus Frieze, Ralph Calder, architect, Michigan State University, East Lansing, Michigan

== Public monuments ==
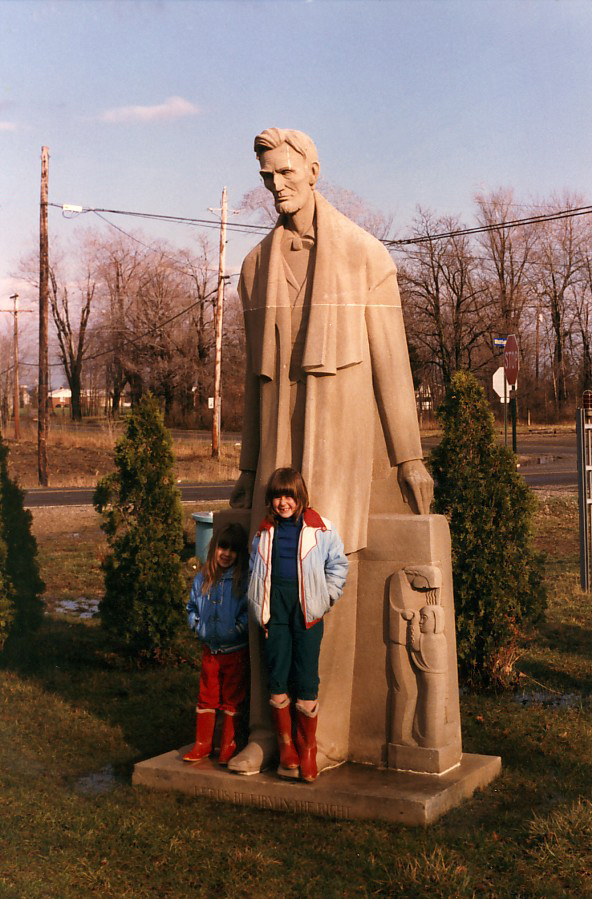
Abraham Lincoln

- Brady Memorial, Belle Isle, Detroit MI, 1928
- Abraham Lincoln, Lincoln Consolidated Schools, Augusta Township, Michigan, 1938
- Pioneer Mother, Clare, Michigan, 1938
- Three Musicians, Michigan State University, East Lansing MI c. 1940
- Miller Memorial, Kellog Building, University of Michigan, Ann Arbor, Michigan, 1940
