= Christopher Lyman Magee Memorial =

Monument in Pittsburgh, Pennsylvania, US

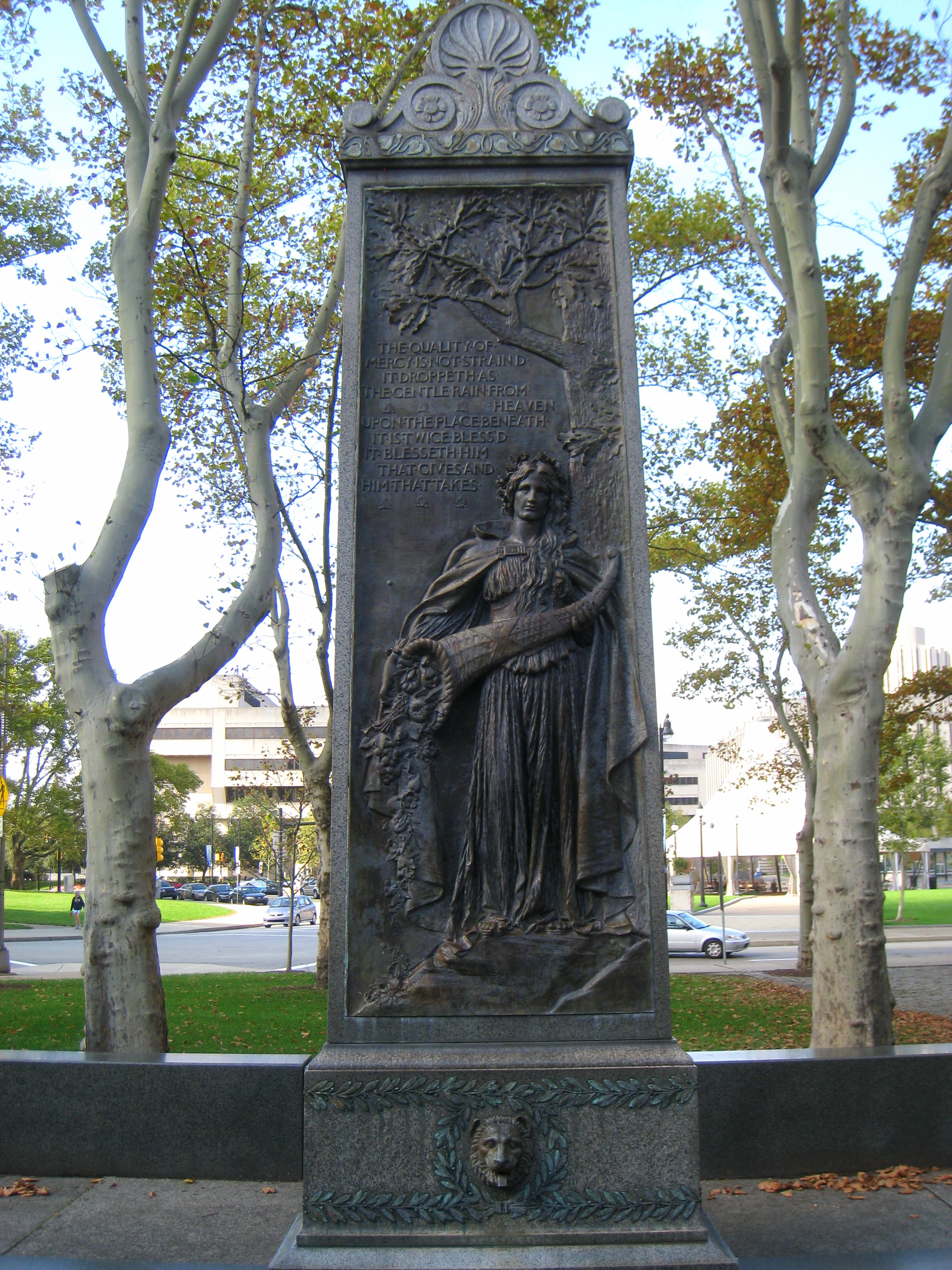
- The memorial in 2009
- Interactive map of Christopher Lyman Magee Memorial
- Location: Carnegie Library, Pittsburgh, Pennsylvania, United States
- Coordinates: 40°26′33″N 79°57′5″W
- Designer: Augustus Saint-Gaudens (sculptor); Stanford White (architect); Henry Bacon (architect)
- Type: Drinking fountain
- Material: Bronze; Granite
- Length: 16 feet 4 inches (4.98 m)
- Width: 37 feet 6 inches (11.43 m)
- Height: 22 feet (6.7 m)
- Beginning date: 1905
- Completion date: 1907
- Dedicated date: July 4, 1908
- Dedicated to: Christopher Magee

The Christopher Lyman Magee Memorial is a public memorial in the Oakland neighborhood of Pittsburgh, Pennsylvania, United States. Located outside of the Carnegie Library of Pittsburgh in Schenley Park, the memorial honors Christopher Magee, a local political boss and philanthropist during the late 1800s. It was designed by sculptor Augustus Saint-Gaudens, with assistance from Henry Hering, while Stanford White and Henry Bacon served as architects for the project. The memorial was dedicated on Independence Day, July 4, 1908, before a crowd of two thousand spectators. It was one of the last works created by Saint-Gaudens, who died several months before its dedication.

== History ==
=== Background ===
Christopher Lyman Magee was an American politician who was born in Pittsburgh, Pennsylvania, in 1848. In the late 1800s, as a member of the Republican Party, he rose to prominence as a political boss and exerted a great deal of influence over the cultural, political, and commercial developments in Pittsburgh and the greater Allegheny County. At various times, he served in political offices, including several terms as Pittsburgh's treasurer and as a member of the Pennsylvania State Senate. Magee was also a philanthropist, serving as a trustee for the Carnegie Institute of Art, and upon his death in 1901, his estate was converted to a hospital.

=== Creation and dedication ===
Following Magee's death, an organization known as the C. L. Magee Memorial Association was established to coordinate the creation of a memorial in his honor. Noted American sculptor Augustus Saint-Gaudens was selected to design the memorial, which would take the form of a public drinking fountain, and he began working on the project in 1905. He was assisted by fellow sculptor Henry Hering. Stanford White served as the initial architect for the project, though Henry Bacon later became the project's architect, succeeding White after he was murdered in 1906. Bacon and Saint-Gaudens had previously collaborated on other works of public art, including memorials for prominent individuals such as Mark Hanna, Charles Stewart Parnell, and James Abbott McNeill Whistler. The memorial was completed in 1907, with Saint-Gaudens receiving $40,000 for his work (equivalent to $1,200,000 in 2021). The memorial was dedicated on July 4, 1908, before a crowd of two thousand spectators. It was one of the last works of art created by Saint-Gaudens, who died several months before the dedication.

In 1994, the memorial was surveyed as part of the Save Outdoor Sculpture! project.

== Design ==
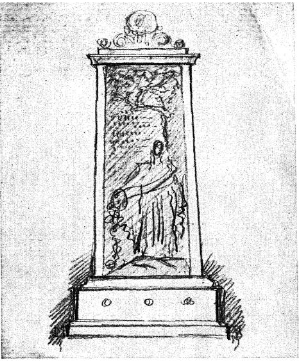
Sketch made by Saint-Gaudens while designing the memorial

The memorial is located in Schenley Park, near the entrance to the Carnegie Library of Pittsburgh in the city's Oakland neighborhood. Its primary structure is a granite stele featuring a bronze relief sculpture of a woman dressed in clothing from classical antiquity, including robes and a cape, representing Charity. She is standing atop a rock and holds a cornucopia filled with fruits and flowers, while a branch from an oak tree is visible near the top of the relief. Just above the figure's head is an inscription of a quote from Portia, a character in the play The Merchant of Venice by William Shakespeare, which reads: "THE QUALITY OF / MERCY IS NOT STRAINED / IT DROPPETH AS / THE GENTLE RAIN FROM / HEAVEN / UPON THE PLACE BENEATH / IT IS TWICE BLESSED / IT BLESSETH HIM / THAT GIVES AND / HIM THAT TAKES". Other inscriptions on the relief include the year of its completion in the lower left in Roman numerals ("MCMVII") and the monogram of sculptor Saint-Gaudens (the letters "AST" surrounded by a large "G"). This front panel stands 22 feet (6.7 m) tall and is 4 feet (1.2 m) wide. Decorations are present on the granite stele that frames the relief, and at the bottom is a bronze waterspout shaped like the head of a lion surrounded by a bronze wreath. The stele is surrounded by a rectangular granite exedra that has dimensions of 37 feet 6 inches (11.43 m) by 16 feet 4 inches (4.98 m). At one point, two drinking fountains were positioned on either end of this exedra and were fed cold drinking water from the nearby Carnegie building. A plaque near the memorial reads "IN MEMORIAM/CHRISTOPHER LYMAN MAGEE".

In sculpting the figure of Charity, Saint-Gaudens employed Davida Johnson Clark, his favorite model, to pose for him, and a preliminary model of the relief used her face, though this was later changed for the finished product. Additionally, early designs for the memorial would have included a relief of Magee's face in profile at the top of the stele, though this was later replaced with a simple anthemion. While Saint-Gaudens had originally intended to carve the relief directly into the granite stele, he opted to instead use bronze after considering the effect that the air pollution in Pittsburgh would have on the memorial. The design of the stele is derivative of some earlier works of Saint-Gaudens, including the plaque Amor Caritas (which was acquired by the Musée du Luxembourg in Paris) and an unused stele design for a memorial to Whistler. The Whistler memorial design, entitled Painting, bore a very strong resemblance to the Magee memorial stele, though with the main figure holding a palette and paintbrush instead of a cornucopia. The overall style of the memorial, with a main central effigy surrounded by a background of stylized lettering and detail, is also indicative of a style that Saint-Gaudens had introduced and popularized in the United States, while the layout of the memorial's base, which saw a central stele emerge from the center of an exedra, was one which Saint-Gaudens had developed with White and can be seen in some of their earlier collaborations, such as the statue of David Farragut in New York City.

== Sources ==
- Dryfhout, John H. (1982). The Work of Augustus Saint-Gaudens. Hanover, New Hampshire: University Press of New England. ISBN 978-0-87451-287-8.
- Evert, Marilyn (1983). Discovering Pittsburgh's Sculpture. Photographs by Vernon Gay. Pittsburgh: University of Pittsburgh Press. ISBN 978-0-8229-3467-7.
- Ferree, Barr, ed. (1909). Year Book of the Pennsylvania Society. New York City: The Pennsylvania Society.
- Saint-Gaudens, Augustus; Saint-Gaudens, Homer (1913). Saint-Gaudens, Homer (ed.). The Reminiscences of Augustus Saint-Gaudens. Vol. II. New York City: The Century Company.
- "Christopher Lyman Magee Memorial, (sculpture)". Smithsonian Institution Research Information System. Archived from the original on November 8, 2022.
- Thomas, Christopher A. (2011). "Bacon, Henry". In Marter, Joan (ed.). The Grove Encyclopedia of American Art. Vol. I. Oxford: Oxford University Press. pp. 185–187. ISBN 978-0-19-533579-8.
