= Mrs. Schuyler Van Rensselaer (Mariana Griswold) =

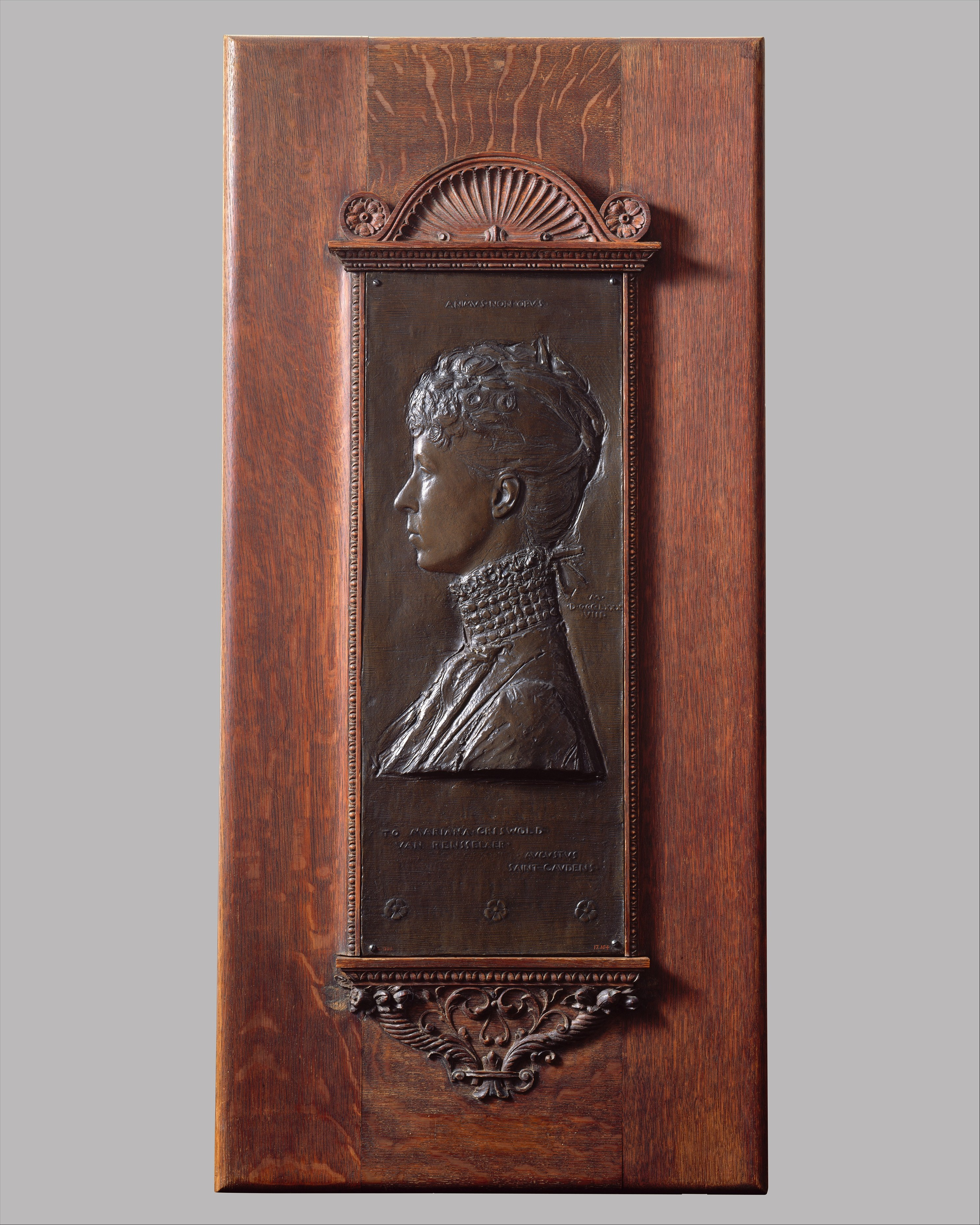
- Artist: Augustus Saint-Gaudens
- Year: 1888, cast 1890
- Medium: Bronze sculpture
- Subject: Mariana Griswold Van Rensselaer
- Dimensions: 51.8 cm × 19.7 cm (20 3/8 in × 7 3/4 in)
- Location: Metropolitan Museum of Art; New York City, New York, U.S.
- Accession: 17.104

Mrs. Schuyler Van Rensselaer (Mariana Griswold) is a bronze sculpture by American artist Augustus Saint-Gaudens. It was designed in 1888 and cast in 1890. This artwork portrays the American author, art critic, and reformer Mariana Griswold Van Rensselaer (1851–1934), who "championed Saint-Gaudens in articles on his public monuments and relief sculptures".

The inscription on the upper center of the sculpture, animvs non opvs ("the spirit, not the work") is a reference to Mrs. Van Rensselaer's "high-minded aesthetic ideals".

The work was given in 1917 by the sitter to the Metropolitan Museum of Art.
