= Augustus Saint-Gaudens =

American sculptor and engraver

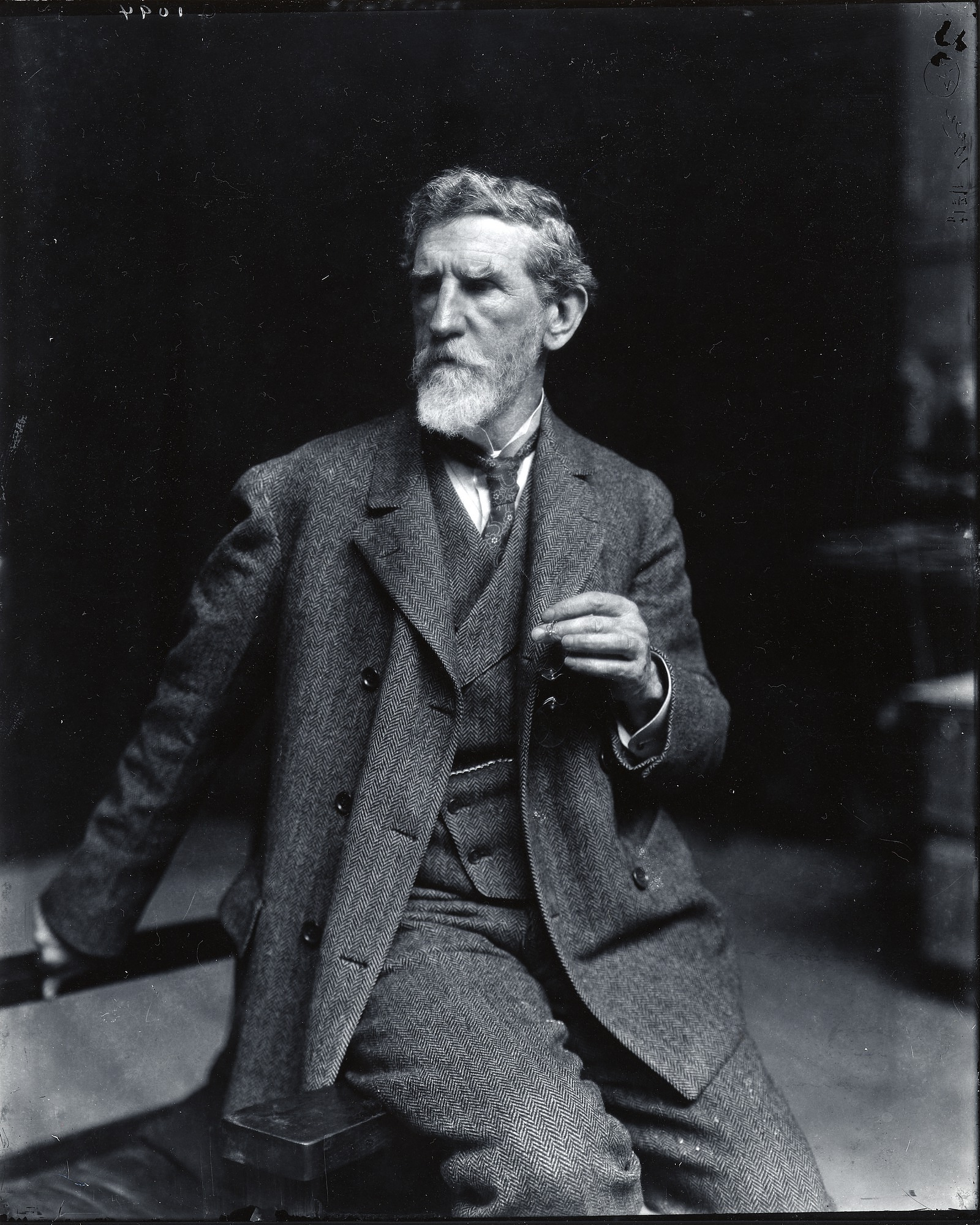
- Saint-Gaudens in 1905
- Born: March 1, 1848; Dublin, Ireland
- Died: August 3, 1907 (aged 59); Cornish, New Hampshire, U.S.
- Education: Cooper Union, National Academy of Design, École des Beaux-Arts
- Known for: Sculpture
- Spouse: Augusta Fisher Homer Saint-Gaudens
- Children: Homer Saint-Gaudens

Augustus Saint-Gaudens (/ˌseɪntˈɡɔːdənz/) was an American sculptor and engraver of the Beaux-Arts generation who embodied the ideals of the American Renaissance.

Saint-Gaudens was born in Dublin to an Irish-French family, and raised in New York City. He traveled to Europe for further training and artistic study. After he returned to New York City, he achieved major critical success for his monuments commemorating heroes of the American Civil War, many of which still stand. Saint-Gaudens created works such as the Robert Gould Shaw Memorial on Boston Common, Abraham Lincoln: The Man, and grand equestrian monuments to Civil War generals: General John Logan Memorial in Chicago's Grant Park and William Tecumseh Sherman at the corner of New York's Central Park. In addition, he created the popular historicist representation of The Puritan.

Saint-Gaudens also created Classical works such as the Diana, and employed his design skills in numismatics. He designed the $20 Saint Gaudens Double Eagle gold coin (1905–1907) for the US Mint, considered one of the most beautiful American coins ever issued, and the $10 Indian Head eagle; both of these were minted from 1907 until 1933. In his later years he founded the "Cornish Colony", an artist's colony in New Hampshire that included notable painters, sculptors, writers, and architects. His brother Louis Saint-Gaudens, with whom he occasionally collaborated, was also a well-known sculptor.

== Early life and career ==
Saint-Gaudens was born on Charlemont Street in Dublin, Ireland, to an Irish mother (Mary McGuinness from County Longford) and French father, Bernard Paul Ernest Saint-Gaudens, a shoemaker by trade from a village in the French Pyrenees, Aspet, 15 kilometres (9.3 mi) from Saint-Gaudens. His parents emigrated to America when he was six months of age, and he was reared in New York City.

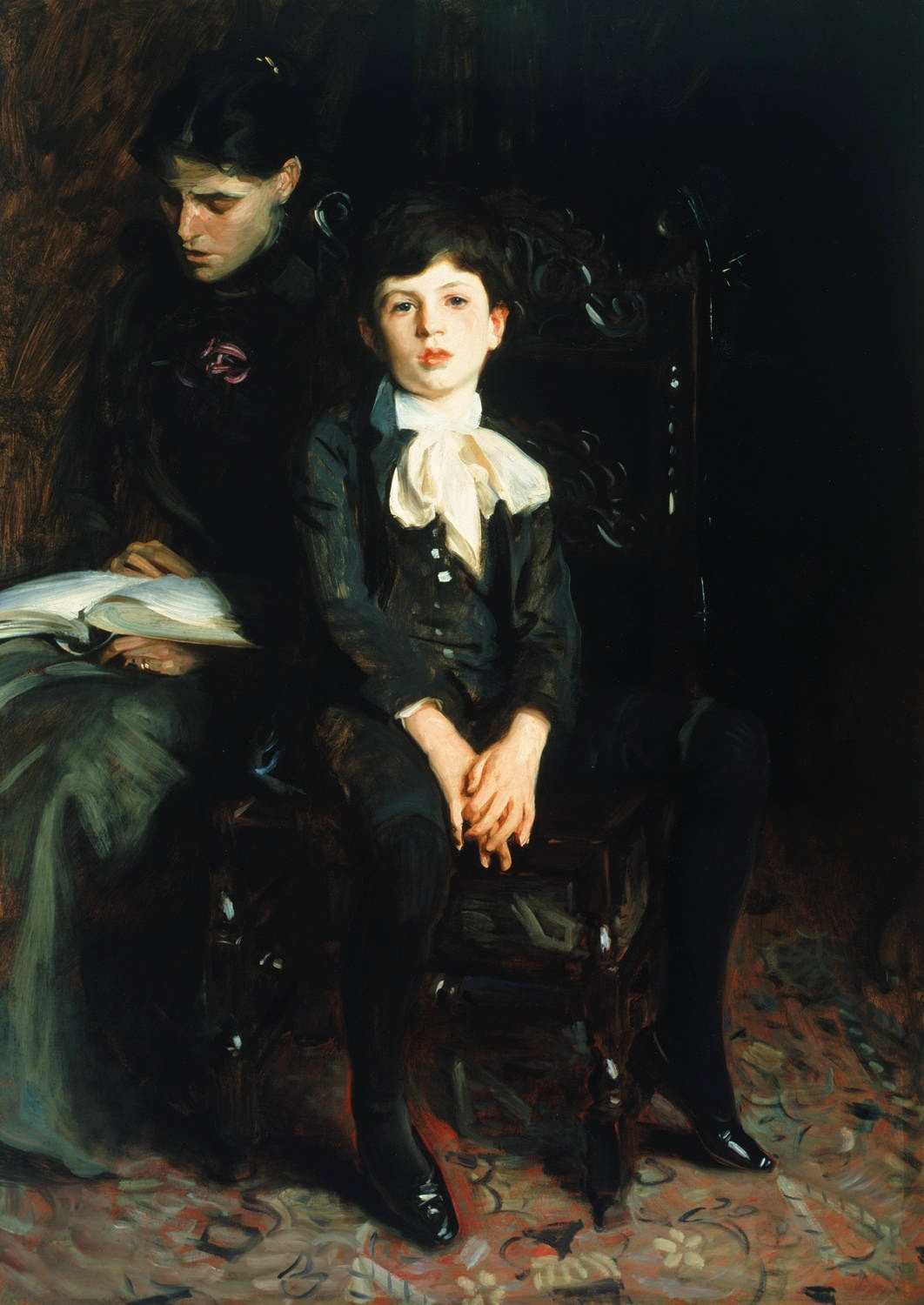
Portrait of Augustus's wife Augusta and their son, Homer Saint-Gaudens, by John Singer Sargent, 1890

In 1861, he became an apprentice to a cameo-cutter, Louis Avet, and took evening art classes at the Cooper Union in New York City. Two years later, he was hired as an apprentice of Jules Le Brethon, another cameo cutter, and enrolled at the National Academy of Design. His apprenticeship was completed by the age of 19 and he traveled to Paris in 1867, where he studied in the atelier of François Jouffroy at the École des Beaux-Arts.

In 1870, he left Paris for Rome to study art and architecture, and worked on his first commissions. There he met a deaf American art student, Augusta Fisher Homer. They married on June 1, 1877. The couple had one child, a son named Homer Saint-Gaudens.

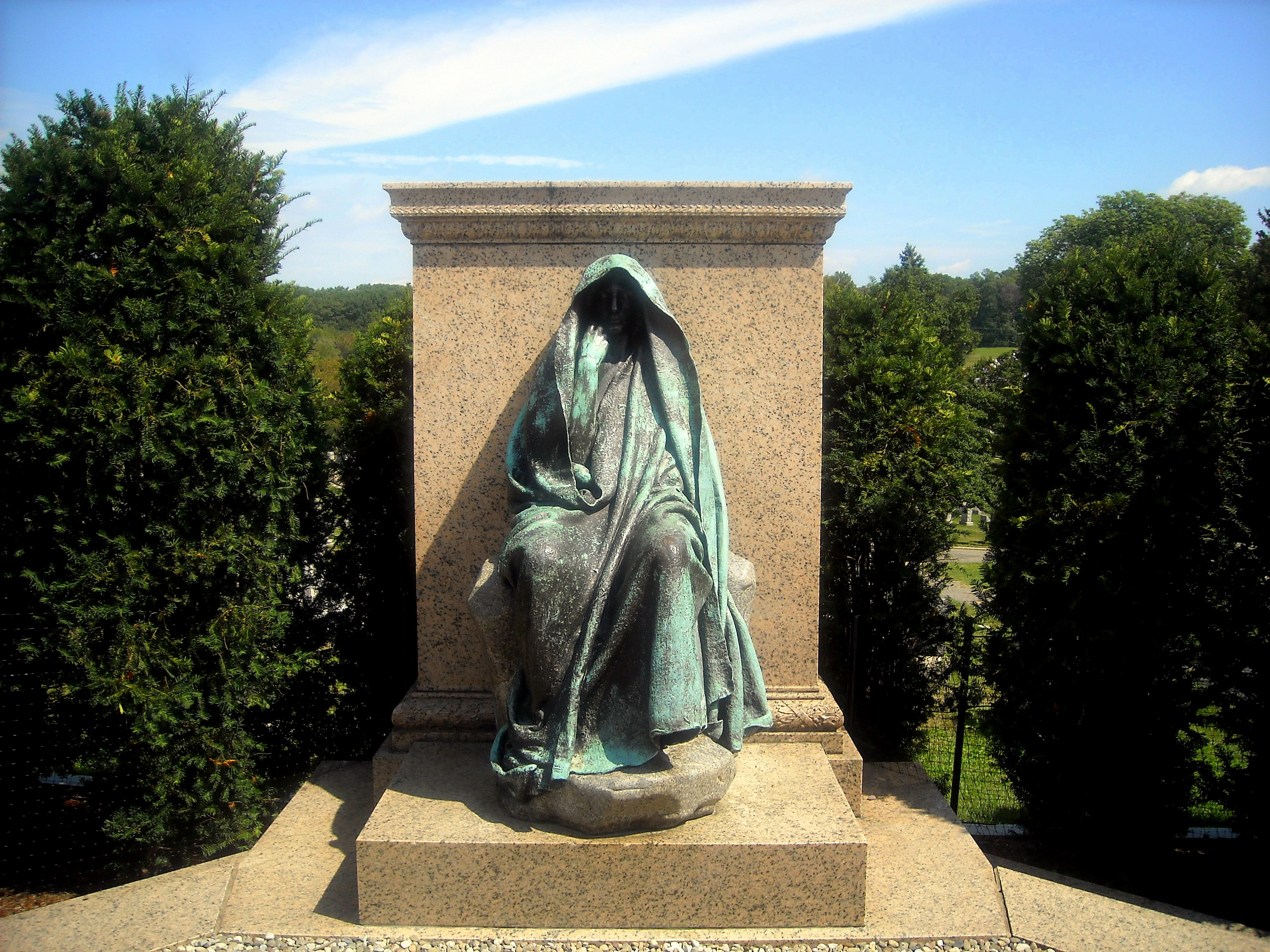
Adams Memorial, Rock Creek Cemetery, Washington, D.C. (1891)

In 1874, Edwards Pierrepont, a prominent New York reformer, hired Saint-Gaudens to create a marble bust of himself. Pierrepont, a phrenologist, proved to be a demanding client, insisting that Saint-Gaudens make his head larger. Saint-Gaudens said that Pierrepont's bust "seemed to be affected with some dreadful swelling disease" and he later told a friend that he would "give anything to get hold of that bust and smash it to atoms".

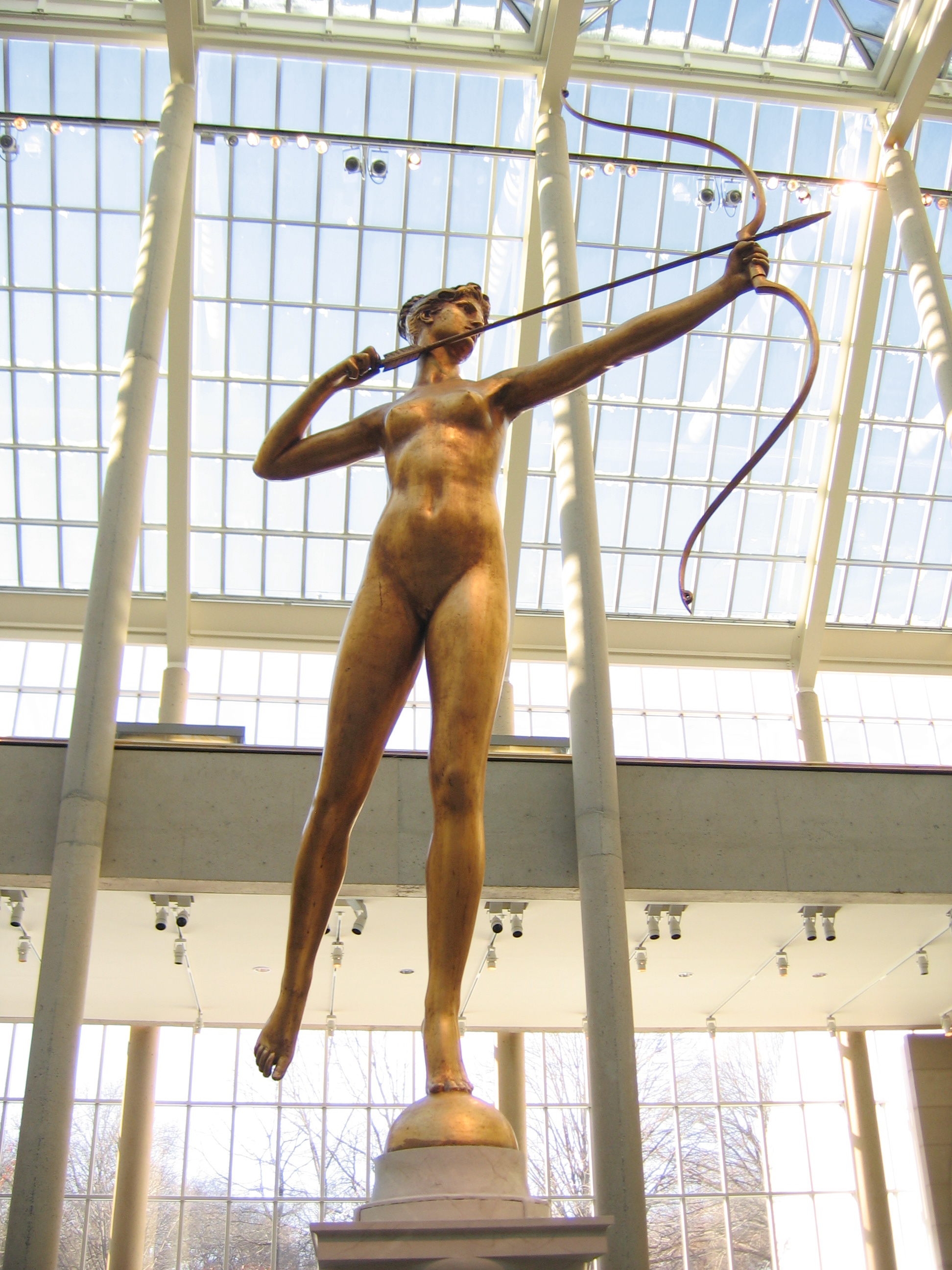
Diana (1892–93). Bronze, Metropolitan Museum of Art, New York City

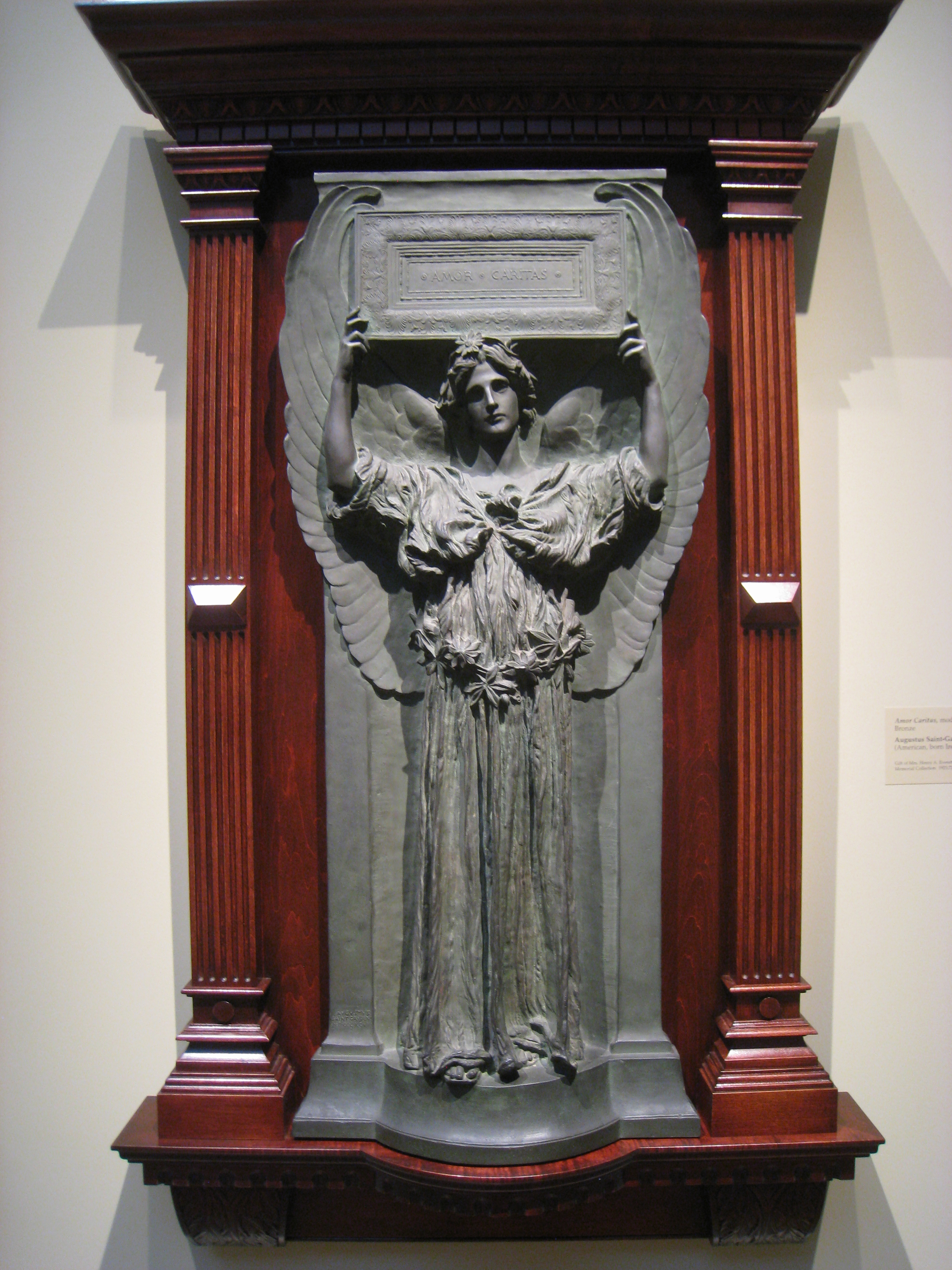
Amor Caritas, bronze (1898), Cleveland Museum of Art

In 1876, he won a commission for a bronze David Farragut Memorial. He rented a studio at 49 rue Notre Dame des Champs. Stanford White designed the pedestal. It was unveiled on May 25, 1881, in Madison Square Park. He collaborated with Stanford White again in 1892–1894 when he created Diana as a weather vane for the second Madison Square Garden building in New York City; a second version used is now in the collection of the Philadelphia Museum of Art, with several reduced versions in museums including the Metropolitan Museum of Art in New York City. The statue stood on a 300-foot-high tower, making Diana the highest point in the city. It was also the first statue in that part of Manhattan to be lit at night by electricity. The statue and its tower was a landmark until 1925 when the building was demolished.

His masterpiece, Amor Caritas (Angel of Charity), is his vision of the ethereal female, which he modeled repeatedly in stone and bronze between 1880 and 1898. A heroic-sized bronze version won the Grand Prize at the Paris Exposition Universelle of 1900, cementing Saint-Gaudens' reputation as America's premier sculptor. Because of its popularity, some 20 smaller-scale versions were produced by Saint-Gaudens and sold through high-end retail outlets such as Tiffany & Co. Most of them are now in museums, including the Metropolitan Museum of Art. The face of the angel, like that of Diana, is modeled after the artist's longtime mistress and muse, Davida Johnson Clark.

In New York, he was a member of the Tile Club, a group of prominent artists and writers, including Winslow Homer (his wife's fourth cousin), William Merritt Chase and Arthur Quartley. He was also a member of The Lambs, Salmagundi Club and the National Arts Club in New York City.

== Civil War commemorative commissions ==
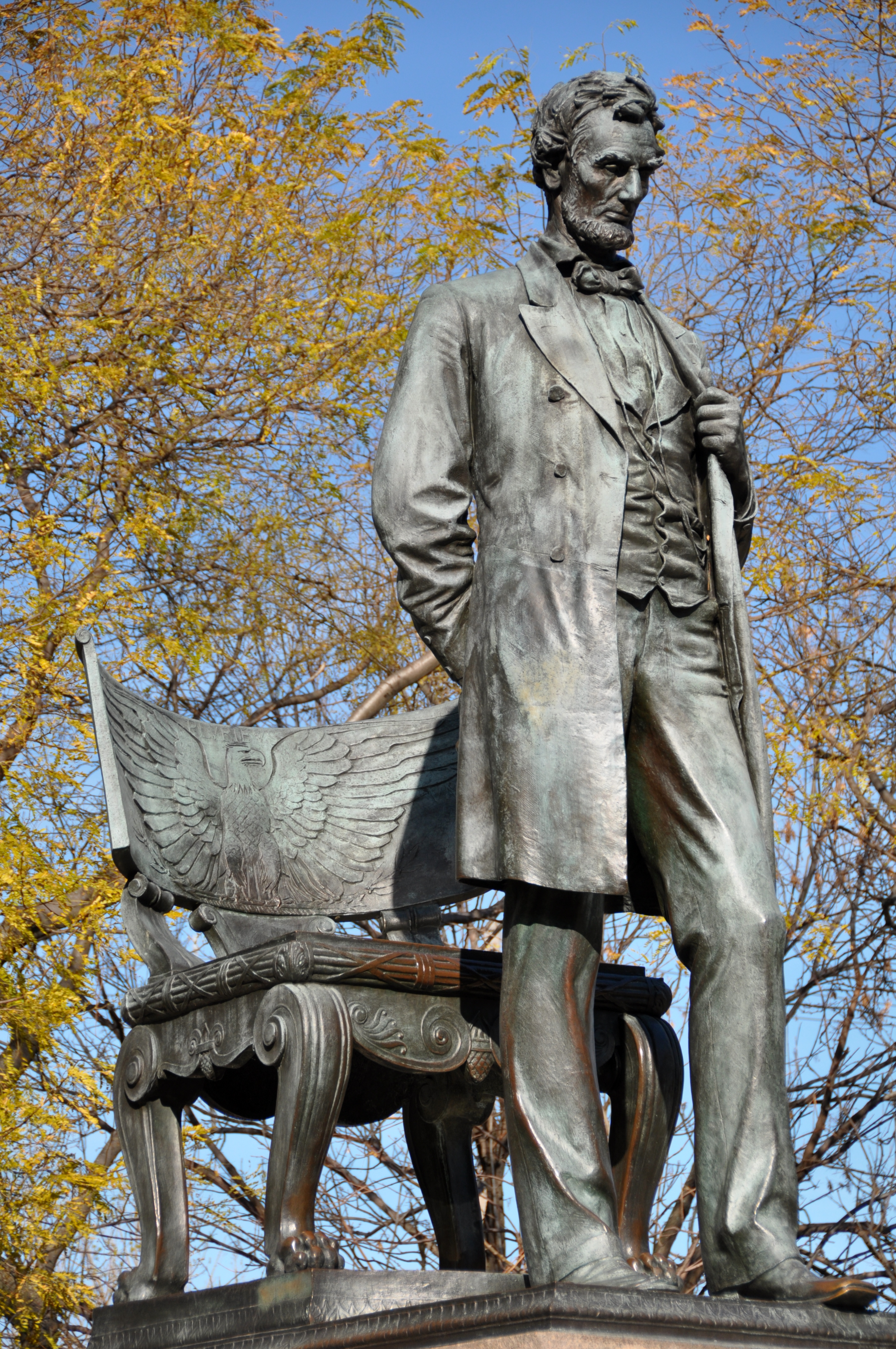
Abraham Lincoln: The Man in Lincoln Park, Chicago (1887)

In 1876, Saint-Gaudens received his first major commission: a monument to Civil War Admiral David Farragut, in New York's Madison Square; his friend Stanford White designed an architectural setting for it, and when it was unveiled in 1881, its naturalism, its lack of bombast and its siting combined to make it a tremendous success, and Saint-Gaudens' reputation was established.

The commissions followed fast, including the colossal Abraham Lincoln: The Man in Lincoln Park, Chicago in a setting by architect White, 1884–1887, considered the finest portrait statue in the United States (a replica was placed at Lincoln's tomb in Springfield, Illinois, and another stands in Parliament Square, London). The statue was highly influential for American artists and received widespread praise by critics.

Other commissions included numerous memorials, funerary monuments and busts, including the Adams Memorial, the Peter Cooper Monument at Cooper Square, and the John A. Logan Monument. Arguably the greatest of these monuments is the bronze bas-relief that forms the Robert Gould Shaw Memorial on Boston Common, 1884–1897, which Saint-Gaudens labored on for 14 years; even after the public version had been unveiled, he continued with further versions. Two grand equestrian monuments to Civil War generals are outstanding: to General John A. Logan, atop a tumulus in Chicago, 1894–1897, and to William Tecumseh Sherman on Grand Army Plaza at the corner of Central Park in New York (with the African-American model Hettie Anderson posing as an allegorical Victory), 1892–1903, the first use of Robert Treat Paine's pointing device for the accurate mechanical enlargement of sculpture models. The depictions of the African-American soldiers on the Shaw memorial is noted as a rare example of true-to-life, non-derogatory, depictions of African physical characteristics in 19th-century American art.

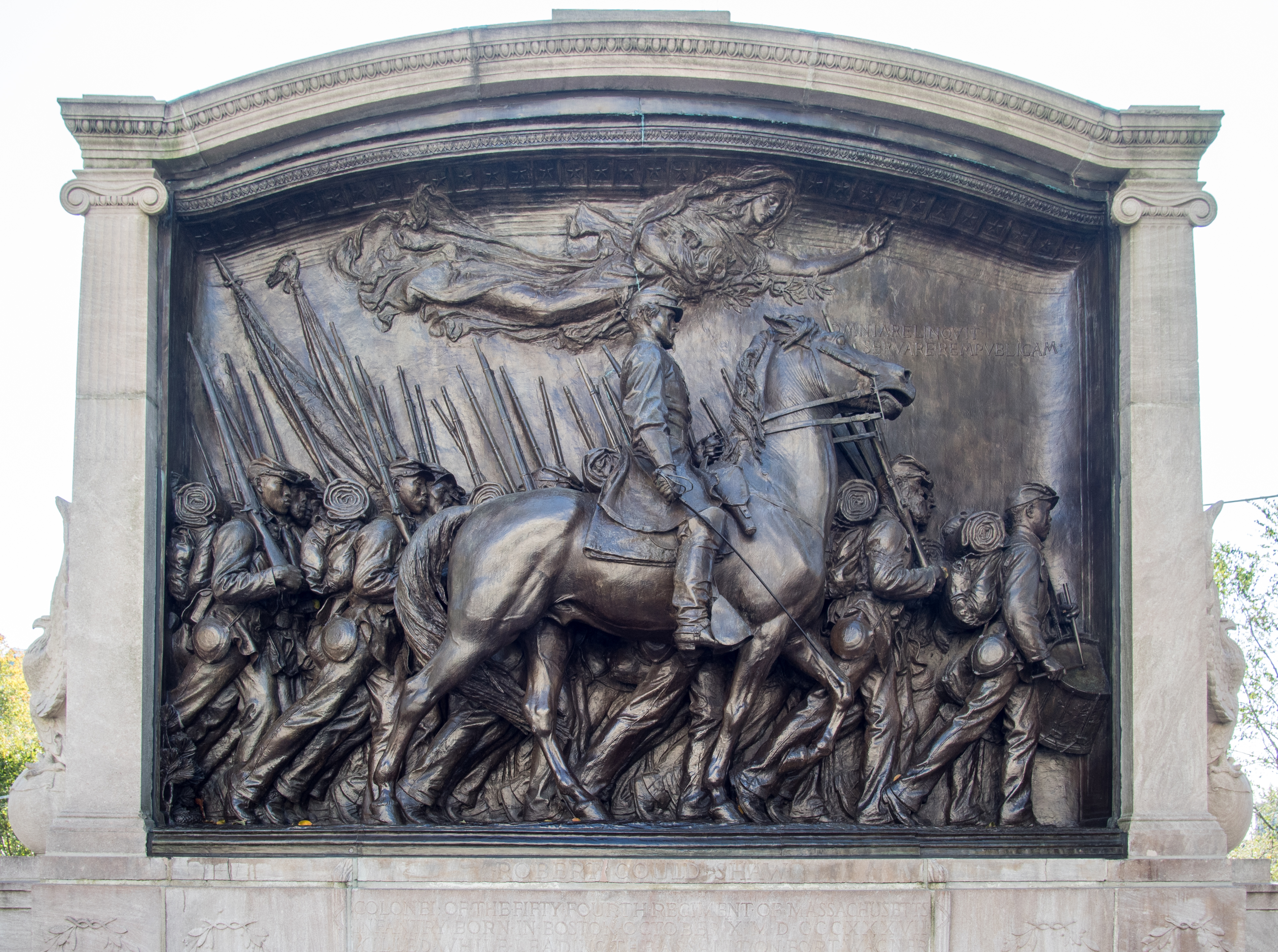
The Robert Gould Shaw Memorial, Boston Common (1884–1897)

For the Lincoln Centennial of 1909, Saint-Gaudens produced another statue of the president. A seated figure, Abraham Lincoln: The Head of State, is in Chicago's Grant Park. Saint-Gaudens completed the design work and had begun casting the statue at the time of his death—his workshop completed it. The statue's head was used as the model for the commemorative postage stamp issued on the 100th anniversary of Lincoln's birth.

== Other works ==
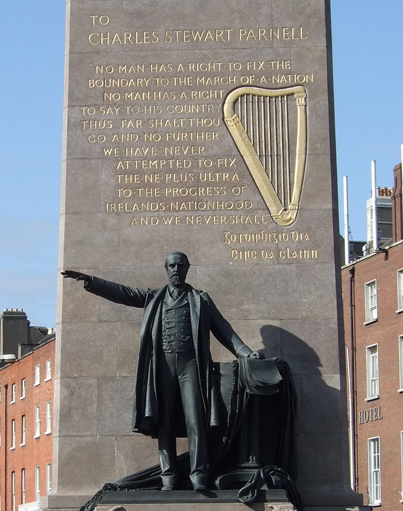
Parnell Monument, Dublin

Saint-Gaudens also created the statue for the monument of Charles Stewart Parnell, which was installed at the north end of Dublin's O'Connell Street, backing on to Parnell Square in 1911.

In 1887, when Robert Louis Stevenson made his second trip to the United States, Saint-Gaudens had the opportunity to make the preliminary sketches for a five-year project of a medallion depicting Stevenson, in very poor health at the time, propped in bed writing. With minor modifications, this medallion was reproduced for the Stevenson memorial in St. Giles' Cathedral, Edinburgh. Stevenson's cousin and biographer, Graham Balfour, deemed the work "the most satisfactory of all the portraits of Stevenson". Balfour also noted that Saint-Gaudens greatly admired Stevenson and had once said he would "gladly go a thousand miles for the sake of a sitting" with him.^{[2]}

Saint-Gaudens was also commissioned by a variety of groups to create medals including varied commemorative themes like The Women"s Auxiliary of the Massachusetts Civil Service Reform Association Presentation Medal and the World's Columbian Exposition Medal. Such pieces stand testament to both his broad appeal and the respect that was given to him by his contemporaries.

A statue of philanthropist Robert Randall stands in the gardens of Sailors' Snug Harbor in New York. A statue of copper king Marcus Daly, first dedicated in 1907, is now placed at the entrance of the Montana Technological University (formerly the Montana School of Mines) on the west end of Park Street in Butte, Montana. A statue of former United States Congressman and New York Governor Roswell Pettibone Flower was dedicated in 1902 in Watertown, New York.

== Teacher and advisor ==
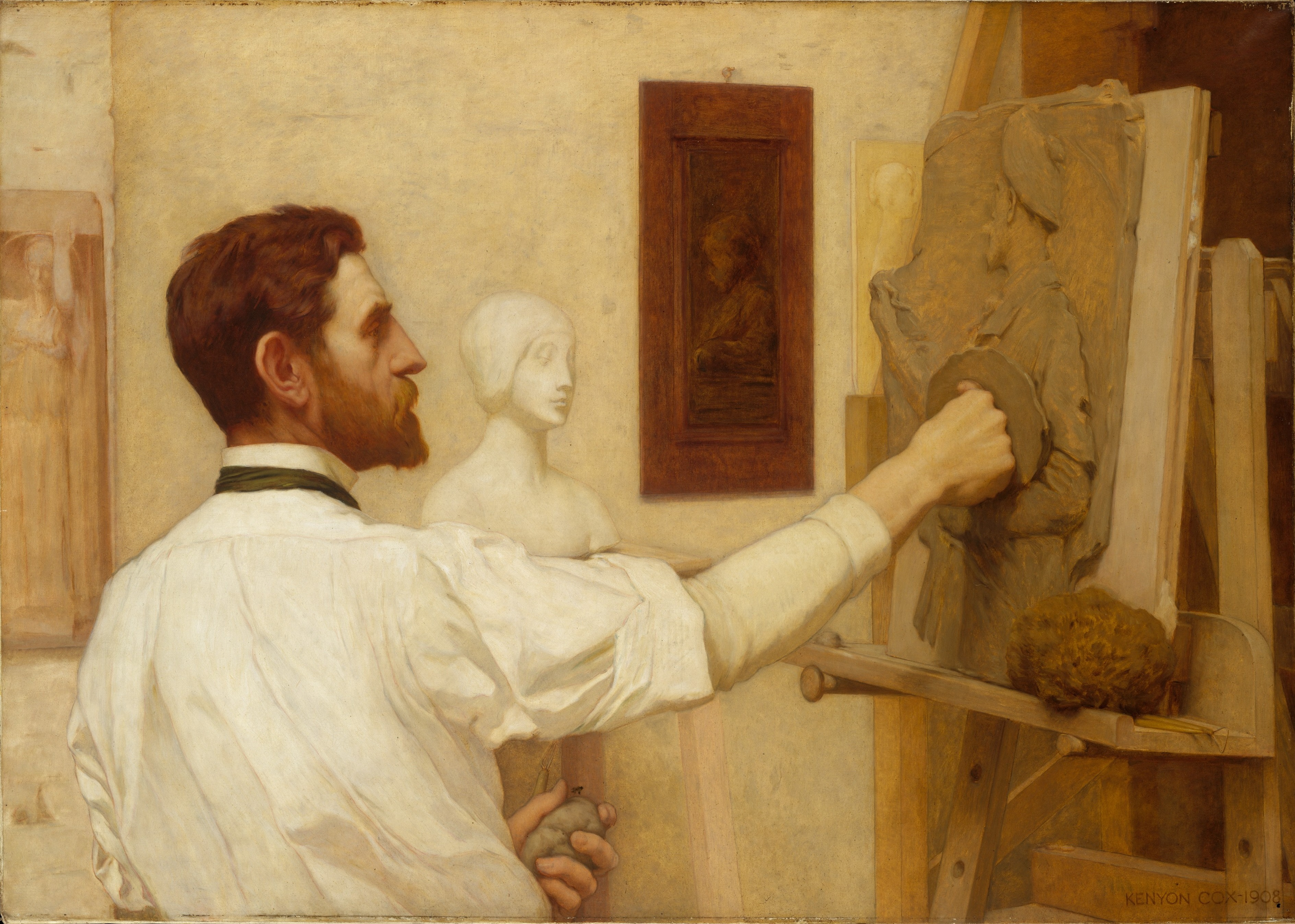
Saint-Gaudens working in his studio, by Kenyon Cox

Saint-Gaudens' prominence brought him students, and he was an able and sensitive teacher. He tutored young artists privately, taught at the Art Students League of New York, and took on a large number of assistants. He was an artistic advisor to the World's Columbian Exposition of 1893, an avid supporter of the American Academy in Rome, and part of the McMillan Commission, which brought into being L'Enfant's long-ignored master plan for the nation's capital.

Through his career Augustus Saint-Gaudens made a specialty of intimate private portrait panels in sensitive, very low relief, which owed something to the Florentine Renaissance. It was felt he heavily influenced another Irish American sculptor, Jerome Connor.

Over the course of his long career Saint-Gaudens employed, and by doing so, trained, some of the next generation's finest sculptors. These included James Earle Fraser, Frances Grimes, Henry Hering, Charles Keck, Mary Lawrence, Frederick MacMonnies, Philip Martiny, Helen Mears, Robert Paine, Alexander Phimister Proctor, Louis Saint-Gaudens, Elsie Ward and Adolph Alexander Weinman.

== Coinage ==
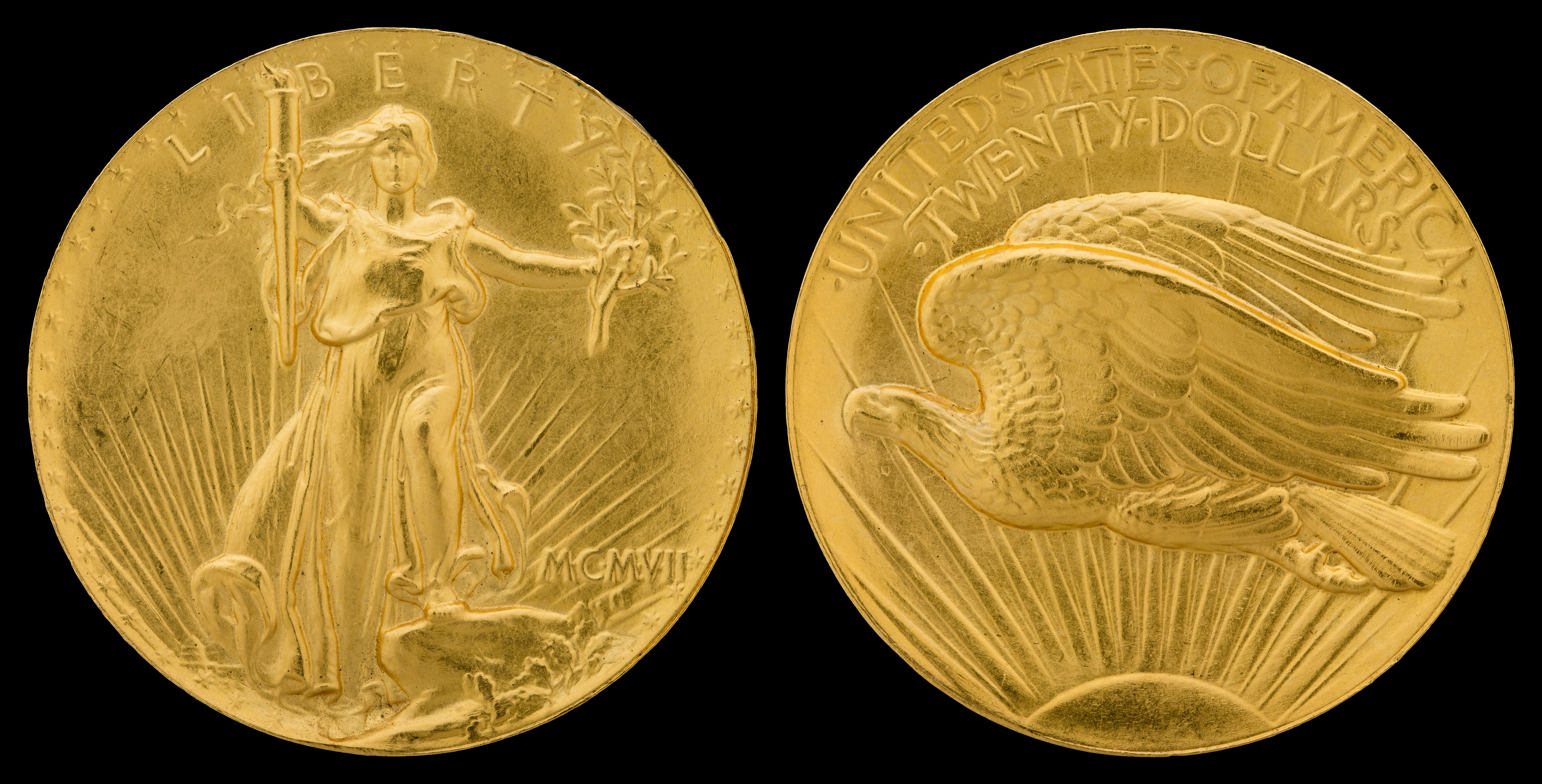
The 1907 Roman numeral ultra high relief double eagle, Saint-Gaudens' design

Saint-Gaudens referred to his early relief portraits as "medallions" and took a great interest in the art of the coin: his $20 gold piece, the double eagle coin he designed for the US Mint, 1905–1907, though it was adapted for minting, is still considered one of the most beautiful American coins ever issued.

Chosen by Theodore Roosevelt to redesign the coinage of the nation at the beginning of the 20th century, Saint-Gaudens produced an ultra high-relief $20 gold piece that was adapted into a flattened-down version by the United States Mint. The ultra high-relief coin took up to 11 strikes to bring up the details, and only 20 or so of these coins were minted in 1907. The Ultra High Reliefs did not stack properly and were deemed unfit for commerce. They are highly sought-after today; one sold in a 2005 auction for $2,990,000. The coin was then adapted into the high-relief version, which, although requiring eight fewer strikes than the ultra high-relief coins, was still deemed impractical for commerce. 12,317 of these were minted, and are currently among the most in-demand U.S. coins. The coin was finally modified to a normal-relief version, which was minted from 1907 to 1933. This design (an "ultra high-relief" $20) was successfully minted in 24 karat gold; 115,178 coins were produced. A surviving 1933 coin sold at auction in 2021 for $18.9 million. This coin's design was reissued by the U.S. Mint in 2009.

== Later life and the Cornish Colony ==
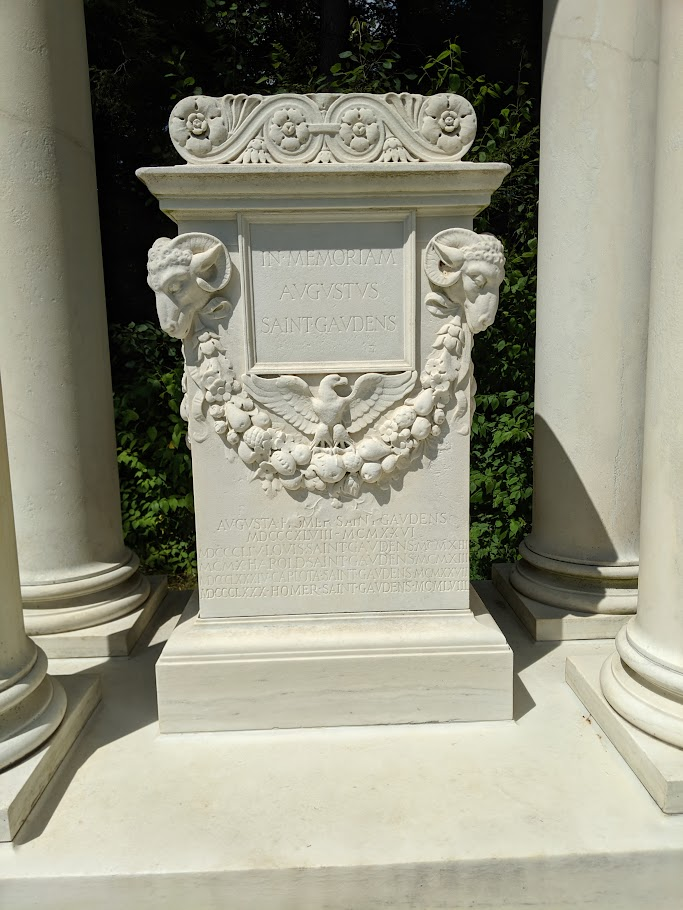
Saint-Gaudens' grave in Cornish, New Hampshire

Diagnosed with cancer in 1900, Saint-Gaudens decided to live at his Federal house with barn-studio set in the handsome gardens he had made, where he and his family had been spending summers since 1885, in Cornish, New Hampshire – though not in retirement. Despite waning energy, he continued to work, producing a steady stream of reliefs and public sculpture. In 1901, he was appointed a member of the Senate Park, or McMillan, Commission for the redesign of Washington, D.C.'s Mall and its larger park system, along with architects Daniel Burnham and Charles Follen McKim, and landscape architect Frederick Law Olmsted Jr.; in 1902, the Commission published their report, popularly known as the McMillan Plan. In 1904, he was one of the first seven chosen for membership in the American Academy of Arts and Letters. That same year the large studio burned, with the irreplaceable loss of the sculptor's correspondence, his sketchbooks, and many works in progress.

The Cornish Art Colony Saint-Gaudens and his brother Louis attracted made for a dynamic social and creative environment. The most famous included painters Maxfield Parrish and Kenyon Cox, architect and garden designer Charles A. Platt, and sculptor Paul Manship. Included were painters Thomas Dewing, George de Forest Brush, dramatist Percy MacKaye, the American novelist Winston Churchill, and the sculptor Louis St. Gaudens, Augustus's brother. After his death in 1907, it slowly dissipated. His house and gardens are now preserved as the Saint-Gaudens National Historic Site.

Saint-Gaudens was elected a member of the American Academy of Arts and Sciences in 1896. In 1901, the French government made him an Officier de la Légion d'honneur. In 1920, Saint-Gaudens was posthumously elected to the Hall of Fame for Great Americans.

Saint-Gaudens and his wife figure prominently in the 2011 book The Greater Journey: Americans in Paris by historian David McCullough. In interviews upon the book's release, McCullough said the letters of Augusta Saint-Gaudens to her friends and family in the United States were among the richest primary sources he discovered in years of research into the lives of the American community in Paris in the late 19th century.

== Legacy and honors ==
During World War II the Liberty ship SS Augustus Saint-Gaudens was built in Panama City, Florida, and named in his honor.

In 1940, the U.S. Post Office issued a series of 35 postage stamps, 'The Famous American Series', honoring America's famous artists, poets, educators, authors, scientists, composers and inventors. The renowned sculptor Augustus Saint-Gaudens was among those chosen for the 'Artists' category of this series and appears on this stamp, which was first issued in New York City on September 16, 1940.

New York City's PS40 school is named after Saint-Gaudens.

== Exhibitions ==
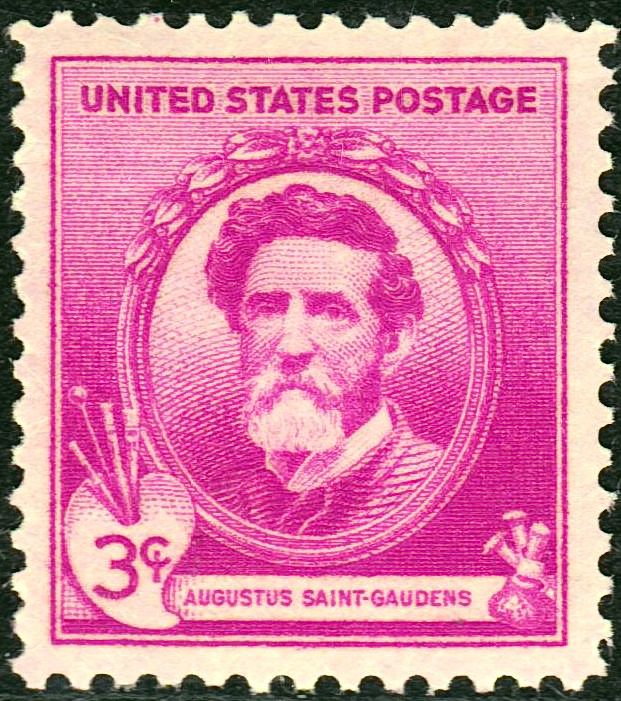
Augustus Saint-Gaudens Issue of 1940

From January 16, 2007 through April 15, 2007, the Flagler Museum, Palm Beach, Florida, exhibited Augustus Saint-Gaudens: American Sculptor of the Gilded Age. It was organized by the Trust for Museum Exhibitions, Washington, D.C. in collaboration with the Saint-Gaudens National Historic Site, Cornish, New Hampshire and displayed over 60 works. An earlier version of the show was shown at the North Carolina Museum of Art, February 23–May 11, 2003.

From June 30–November 15, 2009, the Metropolitan Museum of Art exhibited Augustus Saint-Gaudens in The Metropolitan Museum of Art which displayed the full range of his work including cameos, bas-reliefs and public monuments.

From September 15, 2013 - January 20, 2014, the National Gallery of Art, Washington, D.C., exhibited Tell It with Pride: The 54th Massachusetts Regiment and Augustus Saint-Gaudens' Shaw Memorial. The memorial commemorates the July 18, 1863, storming of Fort Wagner, near Charleston, South Carolina by Colonel Robert Gould Shaw and the 54th Massachusetts Regiment, one of the first African American military units raised in the North. The exhibit was also shown at the Massachusetts Historical Society, February 21–May 23, 2014. The exhibit was accompanied by a brochure written by Lindsay Harris and a catalog by Sarah Greenough et al.

In 2023 the American Federation of Arts, Chesterwood, and the Saint-Gaudens Memorial in partnership with the Saint-Gaudens National Historical Park co-organized Monuments and Myths: The America of Sculptors Augustus Saint-Gaudens and Daniel Chester French, an exhibit that examined their intersecting careers. The exhibit appeared at Jule Collins Smith Museum of Fine Art, Auburn University, Auburn, Alabama, May 30–August 7, 2023; Frist Art Museum, Nashville, Tennessee March 1–May 27, 2024, Michener Art Museum, Doylestown, Pennsylvania June 29, 2024 – January 5, 2025 and Brunnier Art Museum, University Museums, Iowa State University, February 8–May 18, 2025. The exhibition catalog was written by Andrew Eschelbacher. ISBN 978-3-777-44097-2

== Collections ==
Among the public collections holding works by Augustus Saint-Gaudens are:

- Addison Gallery of American Art (Andover, Massachusetts)
- Amon Carter Museum (Texas)
- Art Institute of Chicago (Chicago, Illinois)
- Berkshire Museum (Pittsfield, Massachusetts)
- Brigham Young University Museum of Art (Utah)
- Brooklyn Museum of Art (New York City)
- Carnegie Museum of Art (Pittsburgh, Pennsylvania)
- Cincinnati Art Museum
- Courtauld Institute of Art (London)
- Currier Museum of Art (New Hampshire)
- Delaware Art Museum
- Detroit Institute of Arts
- Honolulu Museum of Art
- Lincoln Park Conservatory (Chicago, Illinois)
- Los Angeles County Museum of Art
- Mabee-Gerrer Museum of Art, (Shawnee, Oklahoma)
- Mead Art Museum (Amherst College, Massachusetts)
- Memorial Art Gallery of the University of Rochester (New York)
- Metropolitan Museum of Art, (New York City)
- Museum of the Rhode Island School of Design
- Montclair Art Museum (New Jersey)
- Musée d'Orsay (Paris)
- Museum of Fine Arts, Boston
- National Academy of Design (New York City)
- National Gallery of Art (Washington, D.C.)
- National Portrait Gallery (London)
- North Carolina Museum of Art
- Saint-Gaudens National Historic Site (New Hampshire)
- Newark Museum (New Jersey)
- Pennsylvania Academy of the Fine Arts
- Philadelphia Museum of Art
- Sheldon Memorial Art Gallery (Lincoln, Nebraska)
- Smithsonian American Art Museum (Washington, D.C.)
- Tate Gallery (London)
- Toledo Museum of Art (Ohio)
- United States Senate Art Collection
- Virginia Museum of Fine Arts (Richmond)
- Yale University Art Gallery

== Selected works ==
Title	Image	Year	Location	Material	Notes
Admiral David Glasgow Farragut		1881	Madison Square Park, New York City	Bronze and granite	exedra designed by Stanford White
The Puritan		1887	Merrick Park, near Quadrangle Springfield, Massachusetts	Bronze and granite	
Standing Lincoln		1887	Lincoln Park in Chicago, Illinois	Bronze and granite	architectural setting by Stanford White additional castings located in Parliament Square, London, Mexico City, and at the Saint-Gaudens National Historical Park
Adams Memorial		1891	Rock Creek Cemetery, Washington, D.C.	Bronze and granite	architectural setting by Stanford White
Diana		1893	Philadelphia Museum of Art, USA	Copper and gold leaf	Surviving sculpture was the 2nd version, stood atop New York City's 2nd Madison Square Garden 1893 to it was demolished in 1925. Donated to PMoA in 1932.
General John Logan Memorial		1897	Grant Park in Chicago, Illinois	Bronze and granite	architectural setting by Stanford White, horse modeled by Alexander Phimister Proctor
Robert Gould Shaw Memorial		1897	Boston Common, Boston, Massachusetts	Bronze and granite	architectural elements designed by Charles Follen McKim
William Tecumseh Sherman		1903	Grand Army Plaza, Manhattan	Bronze and granite	granite pedestal designed by Charles Follen McKim
Henry W. Maxwell Memorial		1903	Grand Army Plaza, Brooklyn	Bronze and granite	Assisted by Albert Jaegers
Christopher Lyman Magee Memorial		1908	Schenley Park, Pittsburgh	Bronze and granite	Architectural setting by Stanford White and Henry Bacon Assisted by Henry Hering
Seated Lincoln		1908, unveiled in 1926	Grant Park in Chicago, Illinois	Bronze and granite	architectural setting by Stanford White, Laurence Grant White and Graham, Anderson, Probst and White

== Gallery ==
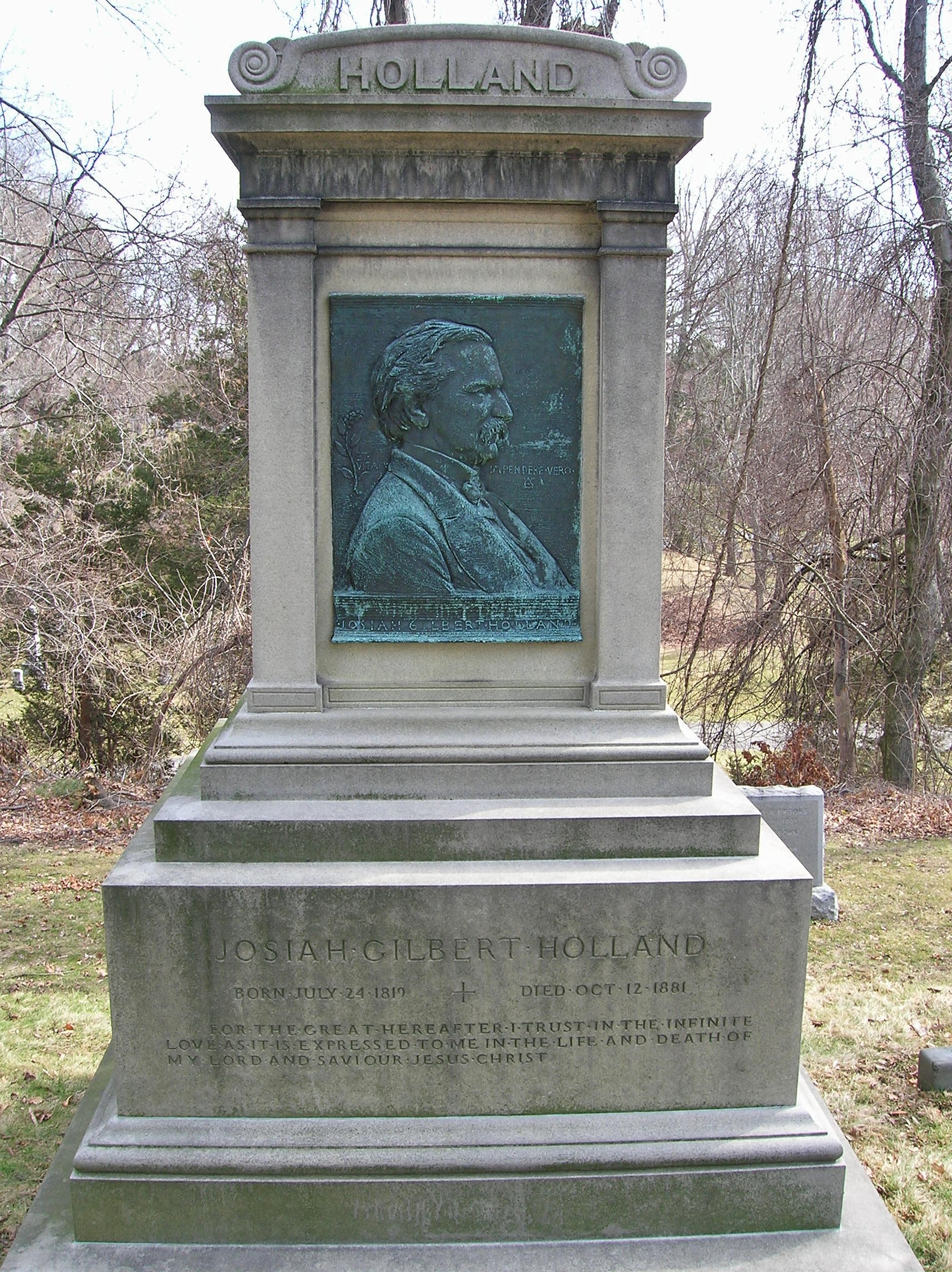
Josiah Gilbert Holland monument, Springfield Cemetery, Massachusetts (1881)

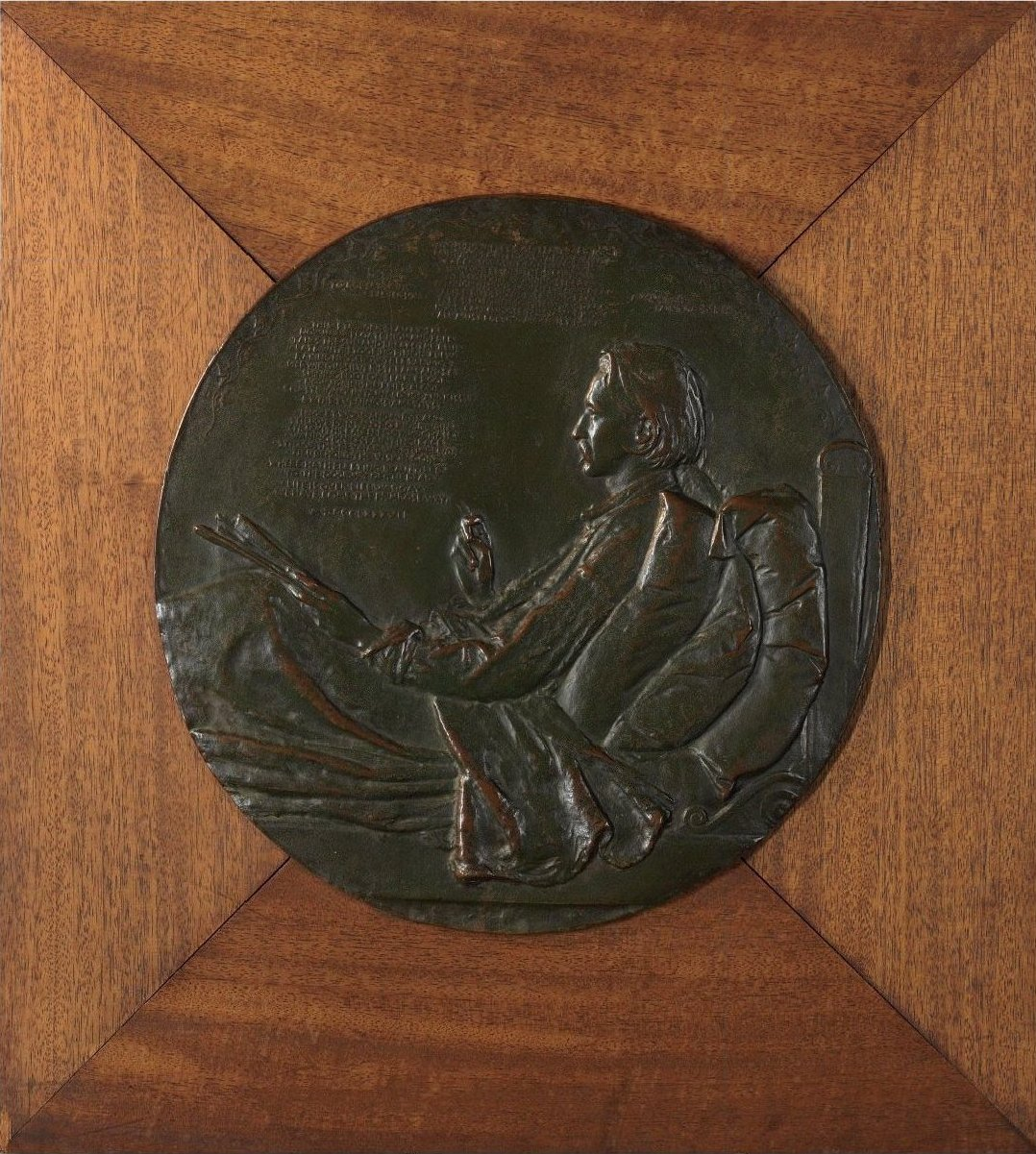
Portrait of Robert Louis Stevenson, 1887–88, Honolulu Museum of Art

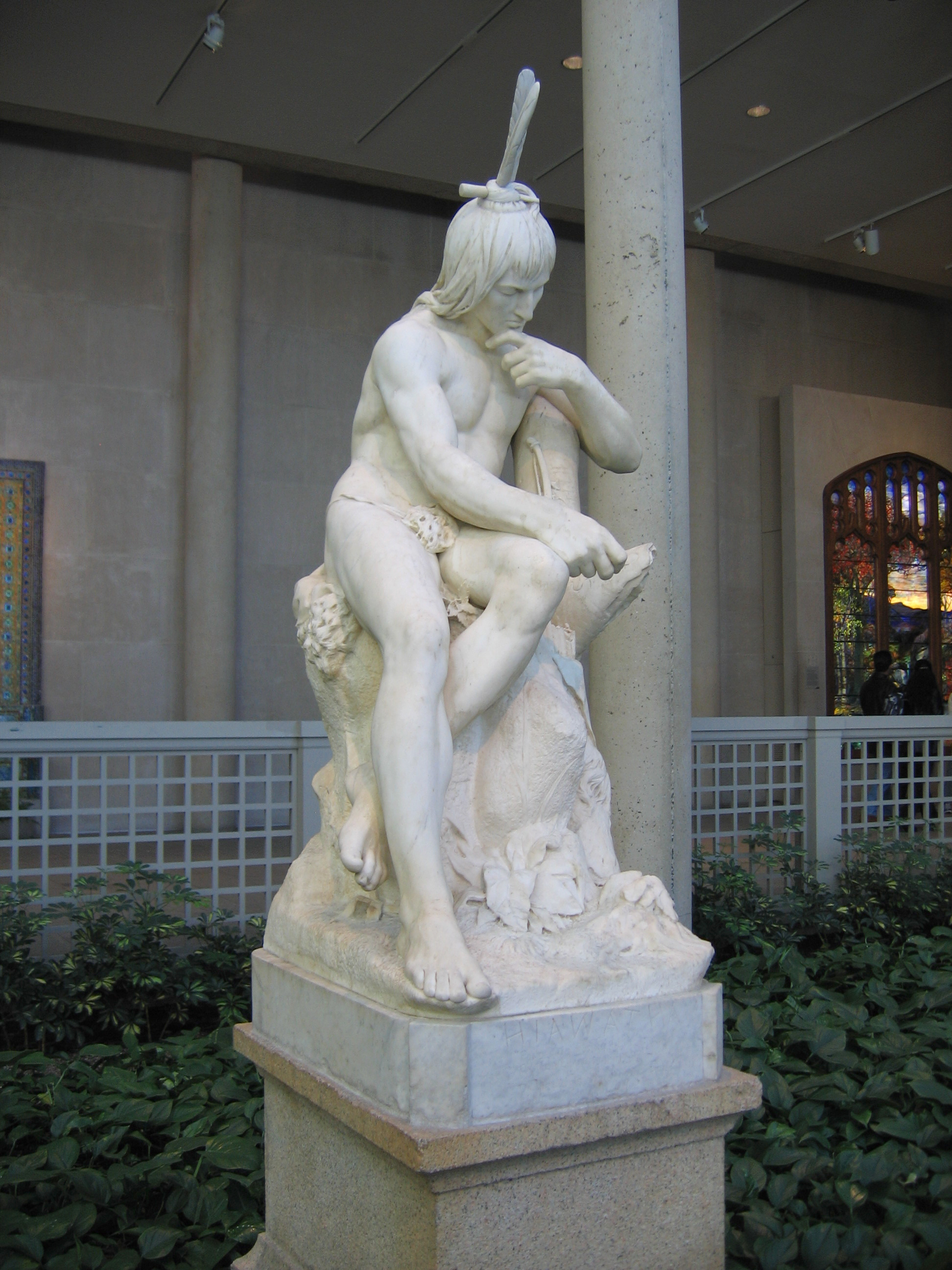
Hiawatha, Marble (1872), Metropolitan Museum of Art

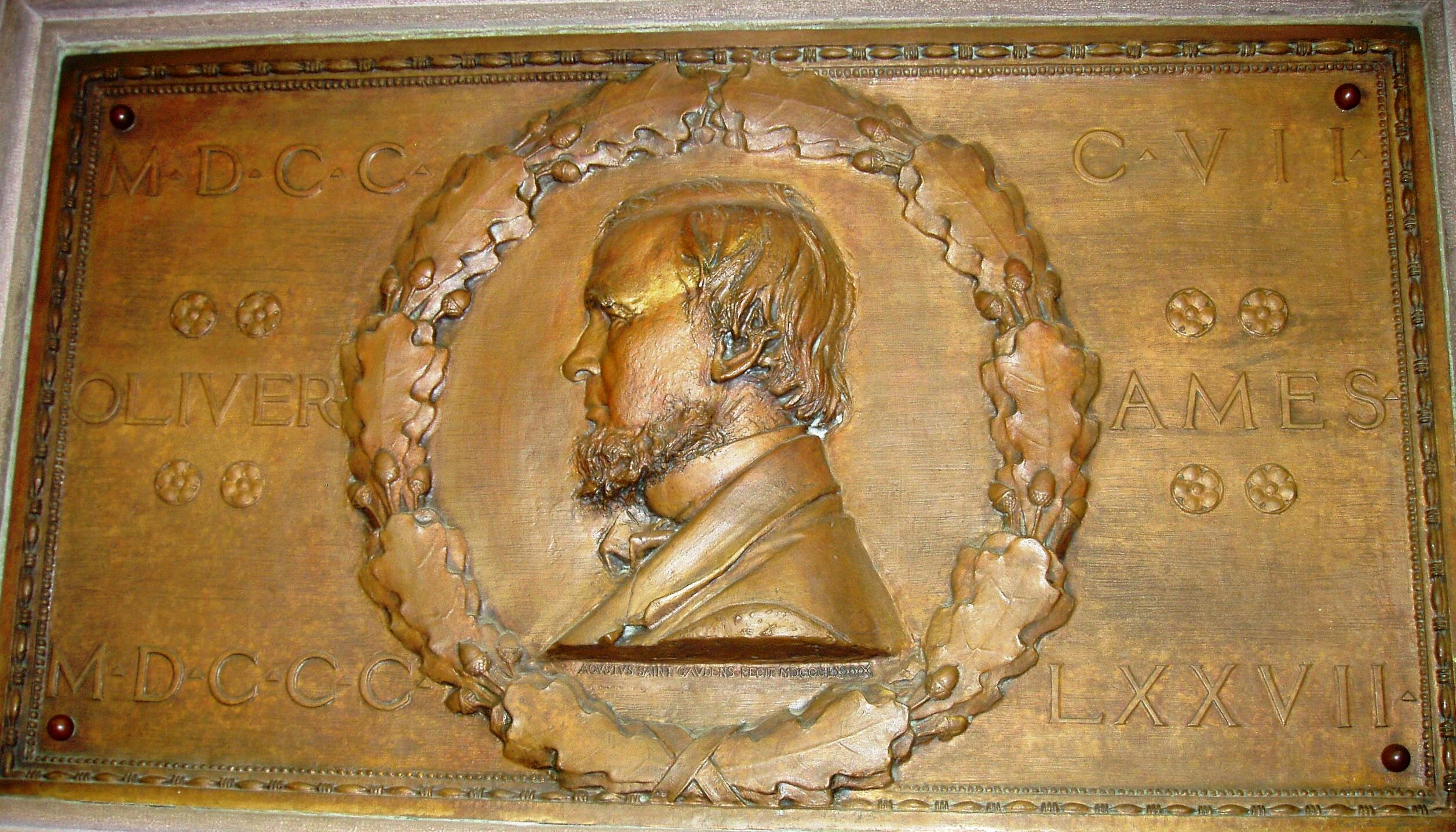
Bas relief of Oliver Ames Jr., Ames Free Library, North Easton, Massachusetts (1883)

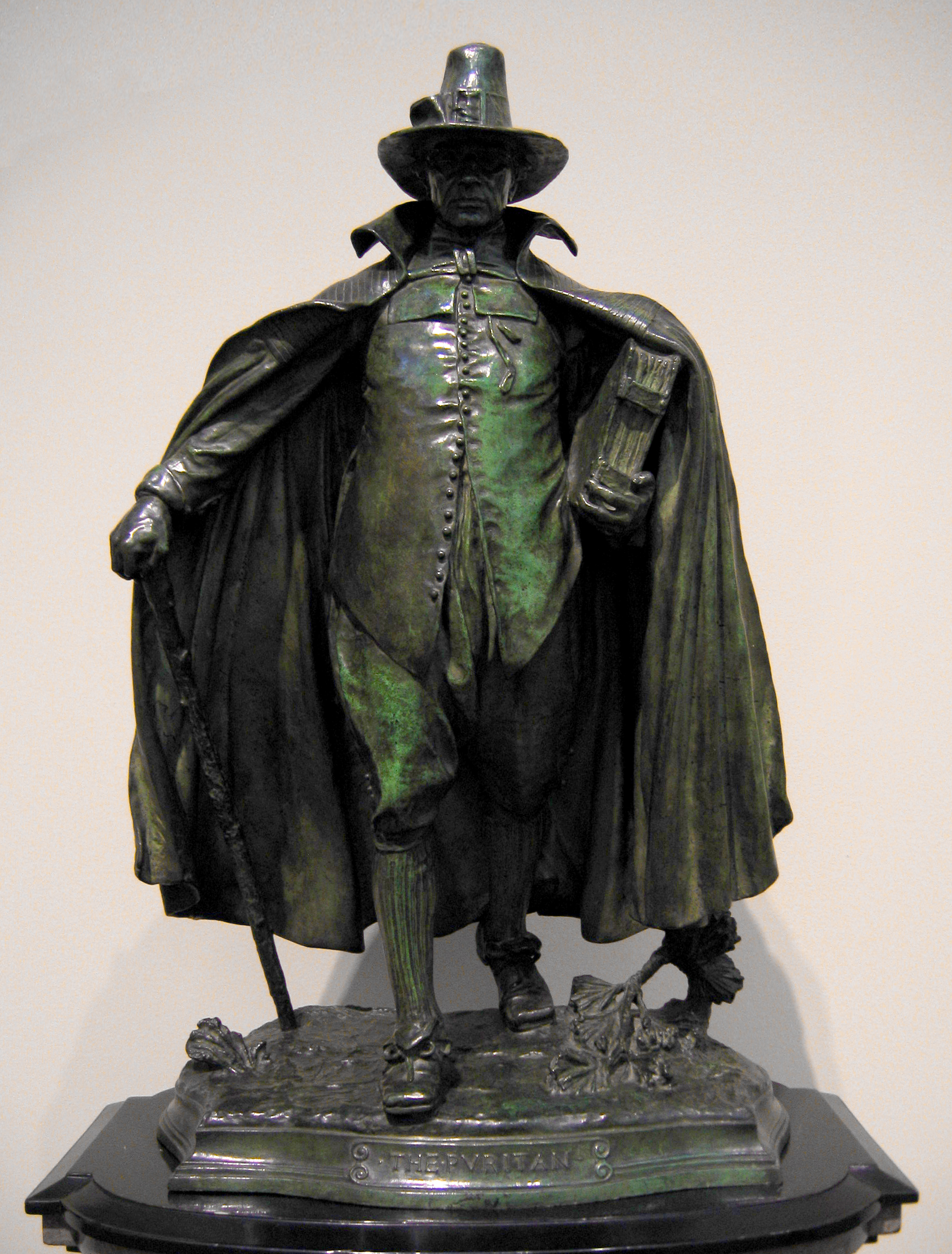
The Puritan, bronze (1883–1886), outdoors in Springfield, Massachusetts, and indoors at the Metropolitan Museum of Art and the National Gallery of Art

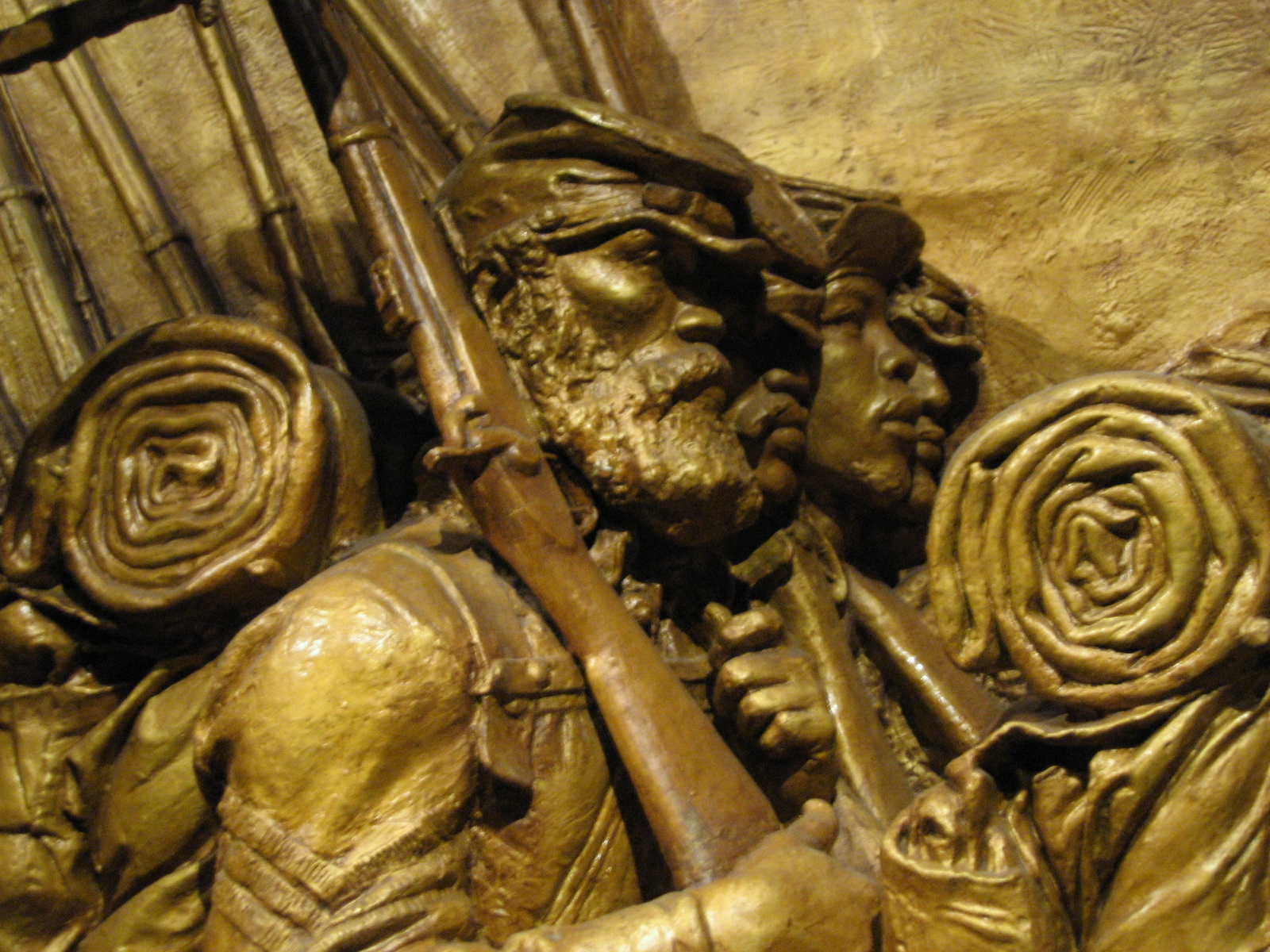
Detail of Shaw Memorial plaster model (1884–1887), National Gallery of Art

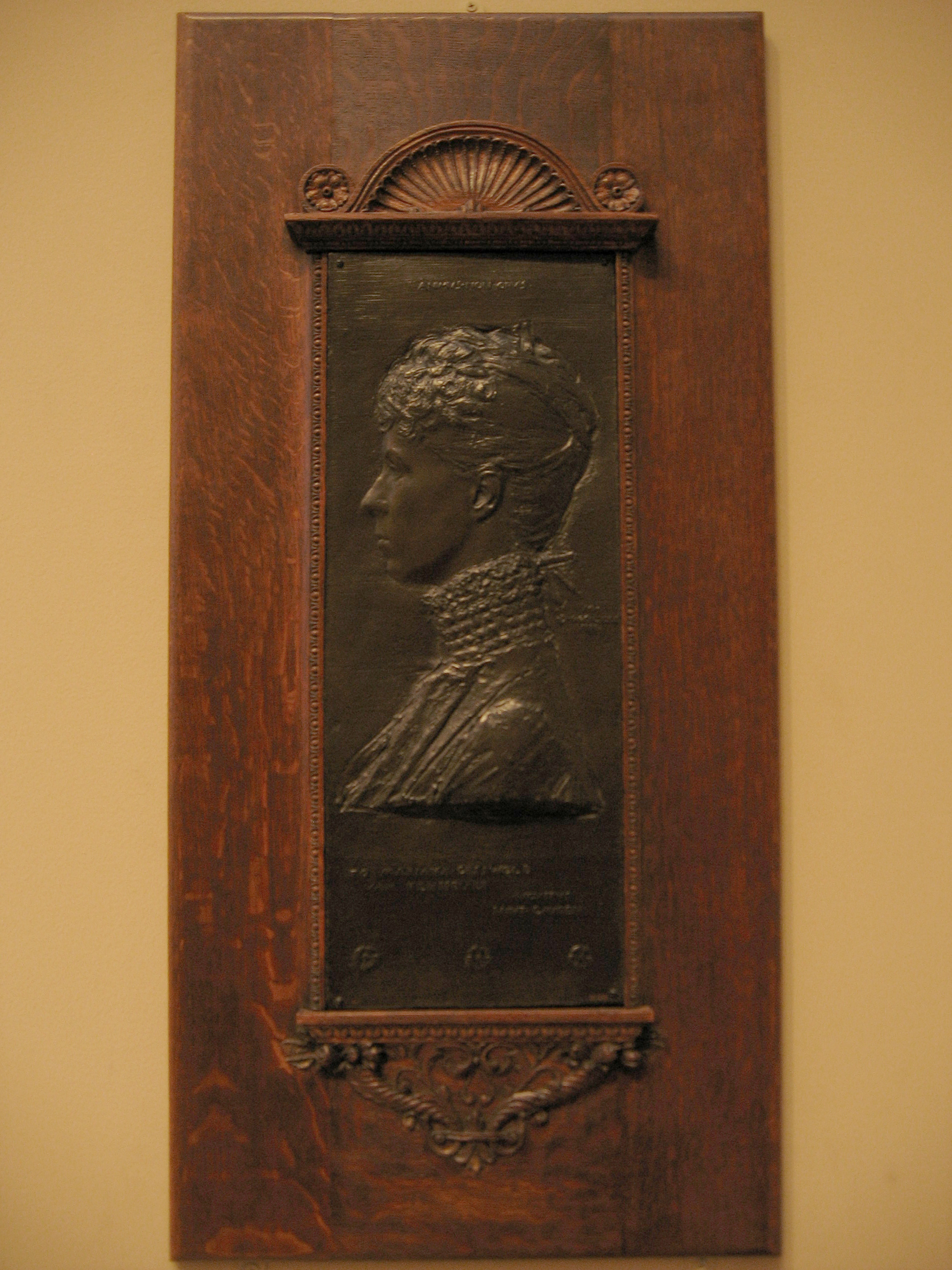
Mrs. Schuyler Van Rensselaer (Mariana Griswold), Bronze (1888), Metropolitan Museum of Art

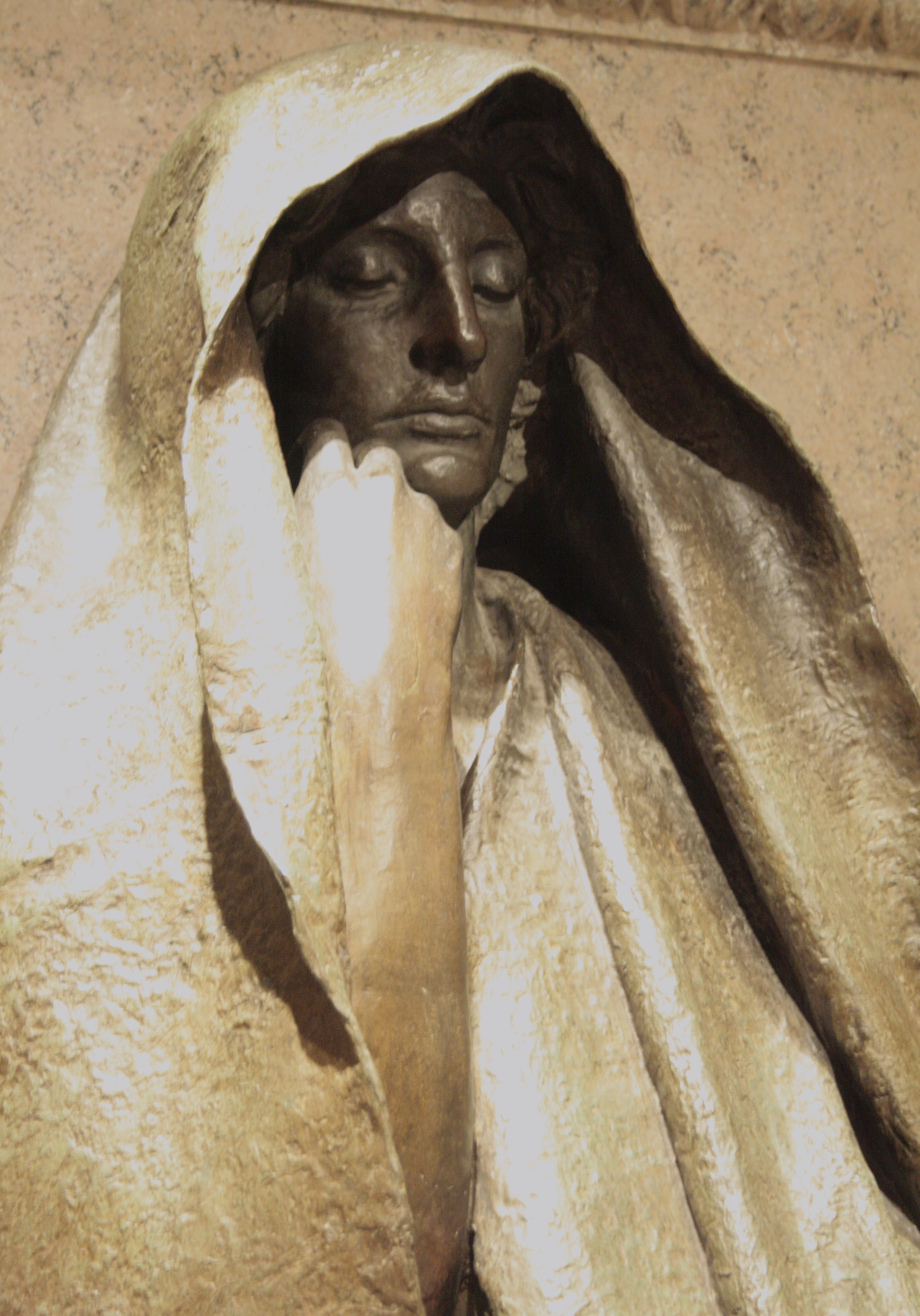
Detail of Adams Memorial, Rock Creek Cemetery, Washington, D.C. (1891)

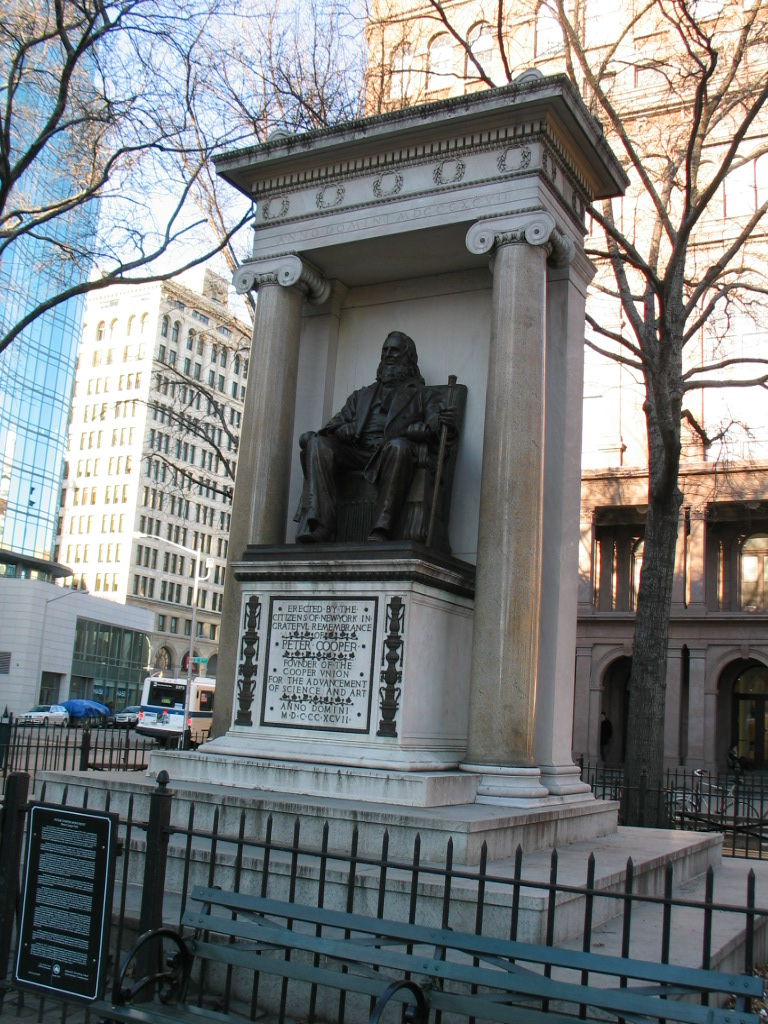
Peter Cooper Monument in front of the Cooper Union, Cooper Square, New York City (1897)

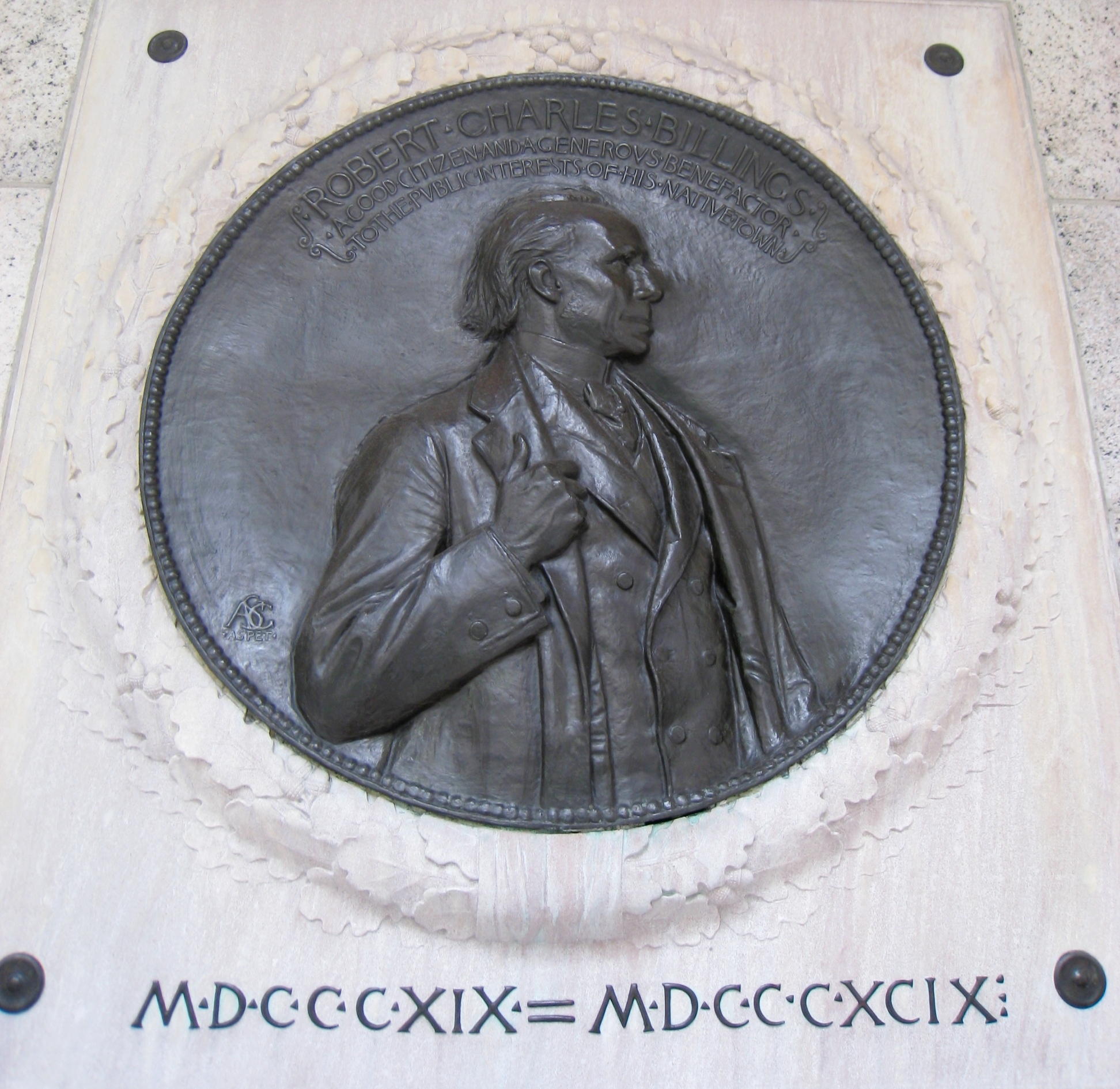
Plaque of Robert Charles Billings, Boston Central Library, Boston, Massachusetts (1899)

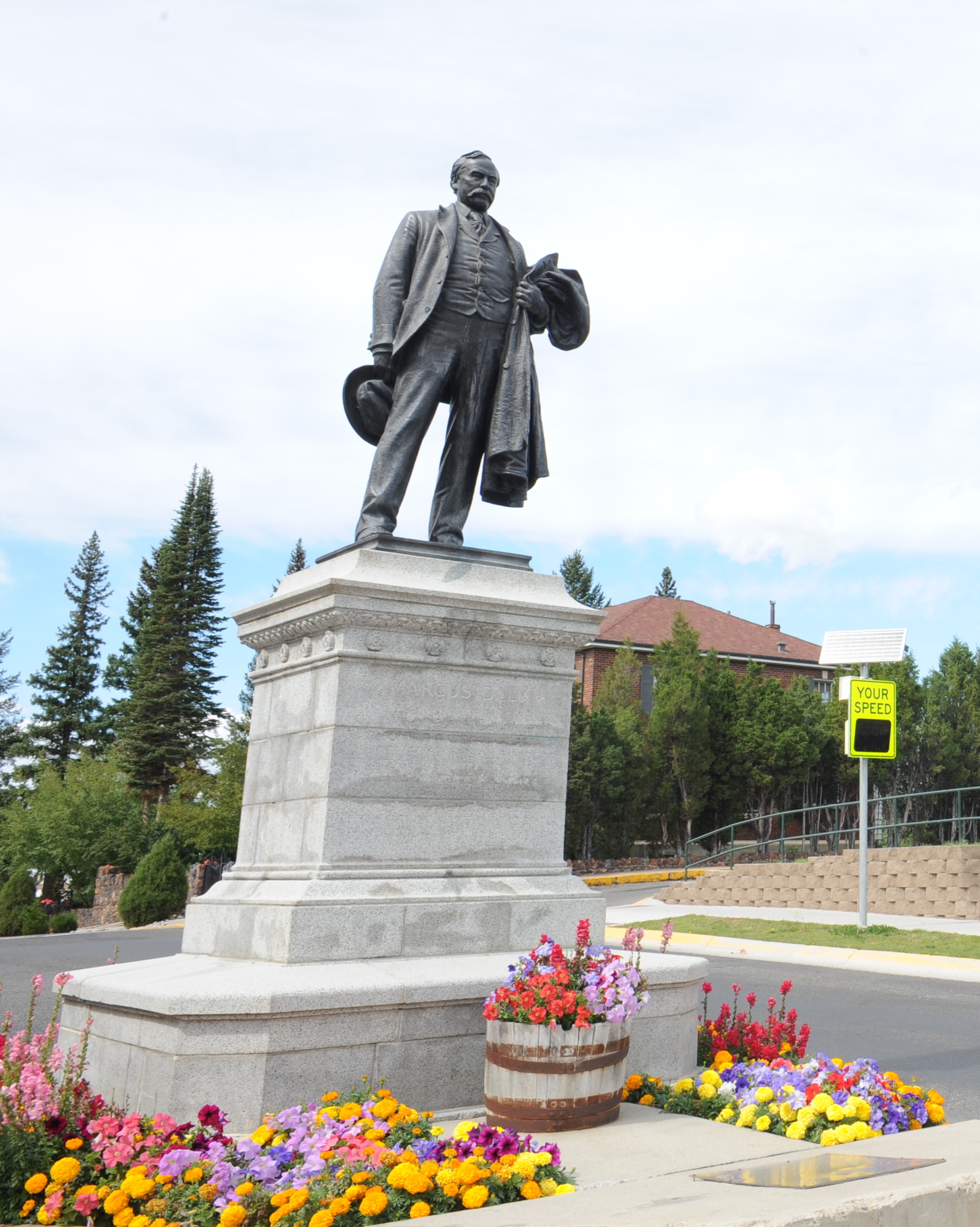
Marcus Daly statue (1906), Montana Tech campus, Butte, Montana

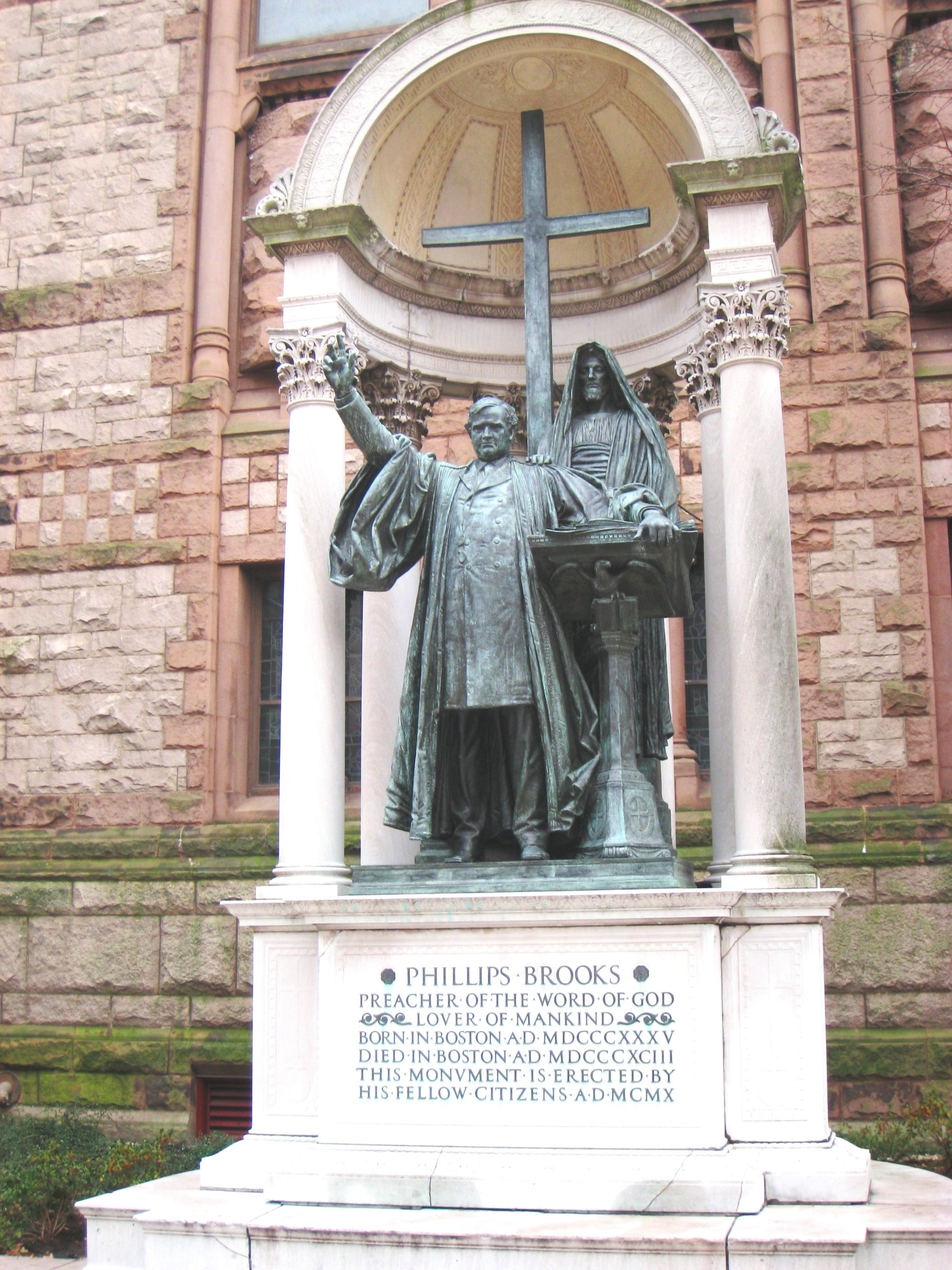
Statue of Phillips Brooks, Trinity Church, Boston (1907–1910, completed by Grimes, Ward and Hering)

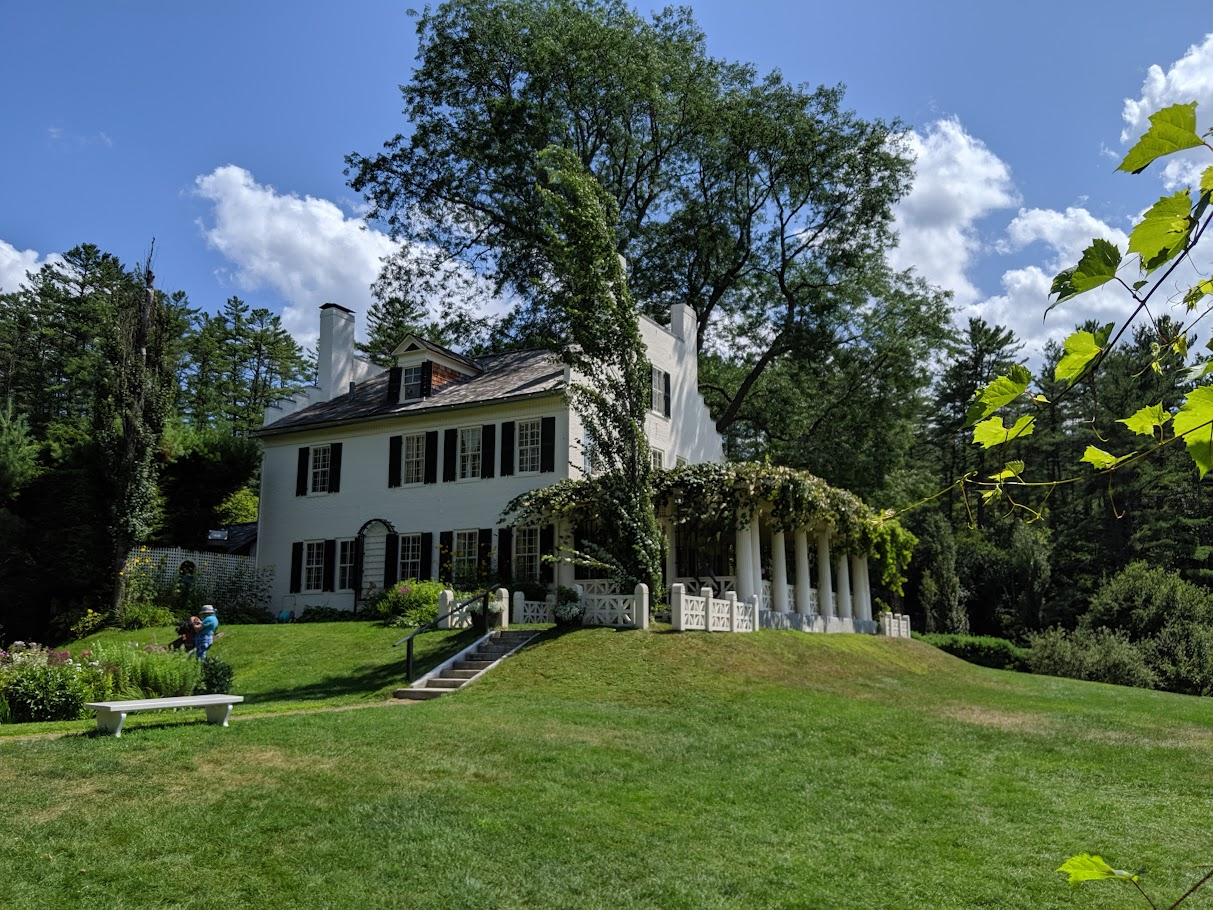
Aspet, Saint-Gaudens' summer home and studio in Cornish, New Hampshire

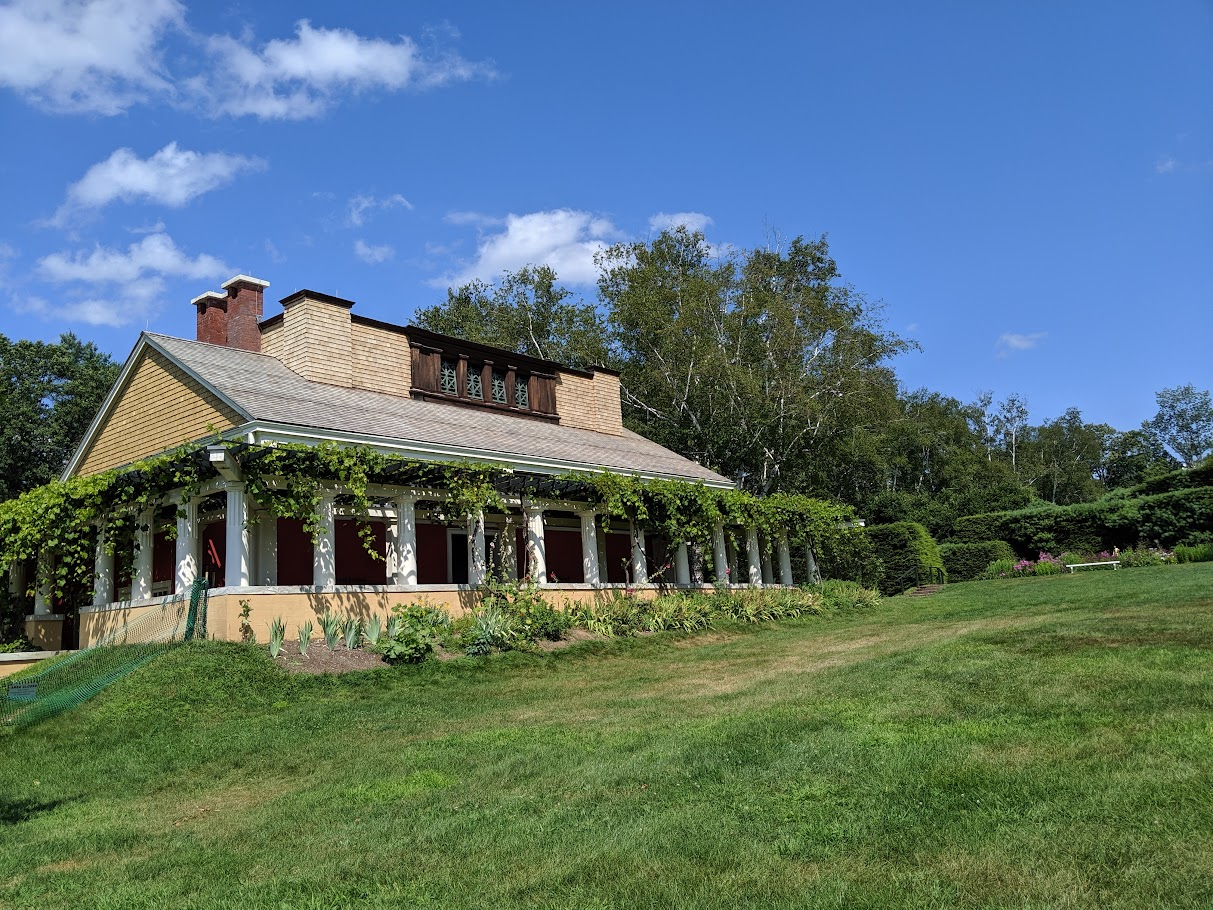
Saint-Gaudens' studio in Cornish, New Hampshire

== See also ==
- Art Students League of New York
- Society of American Artists
