= SS Augustus Saint-Gaudens =

World War II Liberty ship of the United States

History

United States
- Name: Augustus Saint-Gaudens
- Namesake: Augustus Saint-Gaudens
- Owner: War Shipping Administration (WSA)
- Operator: Black Diamond Steamship Co.
- Ordered: as type (EC2-S-C1) hull, MC hull 1549
- Builder: J.A. Jones Construction, Panama City, Florida
- Cost: $1,350,923
- Yard number: 31
- Way number: 3
- Laid down: 20 December 1943
- Launched: 17 February 1944
- Completed: 30 March 1944
- Identification: Call Signal: KWBO
- Fate: Laid up in National Defense Reserve Fleet, James River Group, Lee Hall, Virginia, 19 May 1946; Sold to Italy, 3 May 1947

Italy
- Name: Nazareno
- Owner: Societe Coop di Navigazione Resp. Ltda., Genoa, Italy
- Acquired: 27 May 1947
- Fate: Sold, 1948

Italy
- Owner: Garibaldi Societe Coop di Navigazione Resp. Ltda., Genoa, Italy
- Acquired: 1948
- Fate: Scrapped, 1967

General characteristics
- Class & type: Liberty ship; type EC2-S-C1, standard
- Tonnage: 10,865 LT DWT; 7,176 GRT
- Displacement: 3,380 long tons (3,434 t) (light); 14,245 long tons (14,474 t) (max)
- Length: 441 feet 6 inches (135 m) oa; 416 feet (127 m) pp; 427 feet (130 m) lwl
- Beam: 57 feet (17 m)
- Draft: 27 ft 9.25 in (8.4646 m)
- Installed power: 2 × Oil fired 450 °F (232 °C) boilers, operating at 220 psi (1,500 kPa); 2,500 hp (1,900 kW)
- Propulsion: 1 × triple-expansion steam engine, (manufactured by General Machinery Corp., Hamilton, Ohio); 1 × screw propeller
- Speed: 11.5 knots (21.3 km/h; 13.2 mph)
- Capacity: 562,608 cubic feet (15,931 m^{3}) (grain); 499,573 cubic feet (14,146 m^{3}) (bale)
- Complement: 38–62 USMM; 21–40 USNAG
- Armament: Varied by ship; Bow-mounted 3-inch (76 mm)/50-caliber gun; Stern-mounted 4-inch (102 mm)/50-caliber gun; 2–8 × single 20-millimeter (0.79 in) Oerlikon anti-aircraft (AA) cannons and/or, 2–8 × 37-millimeter (1.46 in) M1 AA guns

SS Augustus Saint-Gaudens was a Liberty ship built in the United States during World War II. She was named after Augustus Saint-Gaudens, a Beaux-Arts sculptor that embodied the ideals of the "American Renaissance", designer of the Saint-Gaudens double eagle, and founder of the "Cornish Colony".

== Construction ==
Augustus Saint-Gaudens was laid down on 20 December 1943, under a Maritime Commission (MARCOM) contract, MC hull 1549, by J.A. Jones Construction, Panama City, Florida; she was launched on 17 February 1944.

== History ==
She was allocated to Black Diamond Steamship Company, on 30 March 1944. On 17 May 1946, she was laid up in the National Defense Reserve Fleet, in the James River Group, in Lee Hall, Virginia. On 3 May 1947, she was transferred to the Italian Government, which in turn sold her to Societe Coop di Navigazione Resp. Ltda., Genoa, Italy, on 27 May 1947. She was renamed Nazareno. In 1948, she was sold to Garibaldi Societe Coop di Navigazione Resp. Ltda., Genoa. She was scrapped in Spezia, in 1967.

== Bibliography ==
- "Jones Construction, Panama City FL". www.ShipbuildingHistory.com. 13 October 2010.
- "Liberty Ships – World War II".
- Maritime Administration. "Augustus Saint-Gaudens". Ship History Database Vessel Status Card. U.S. Department of Transportation, Maritime Administration. Archived from the original on 12 December 2019.
- Davies, James (May 2004). "Specifications (As-Built)" (PDF). p. 23.
- "SS Augustus Saint-Gaudens".
