= Hiawatha (sculpture) =

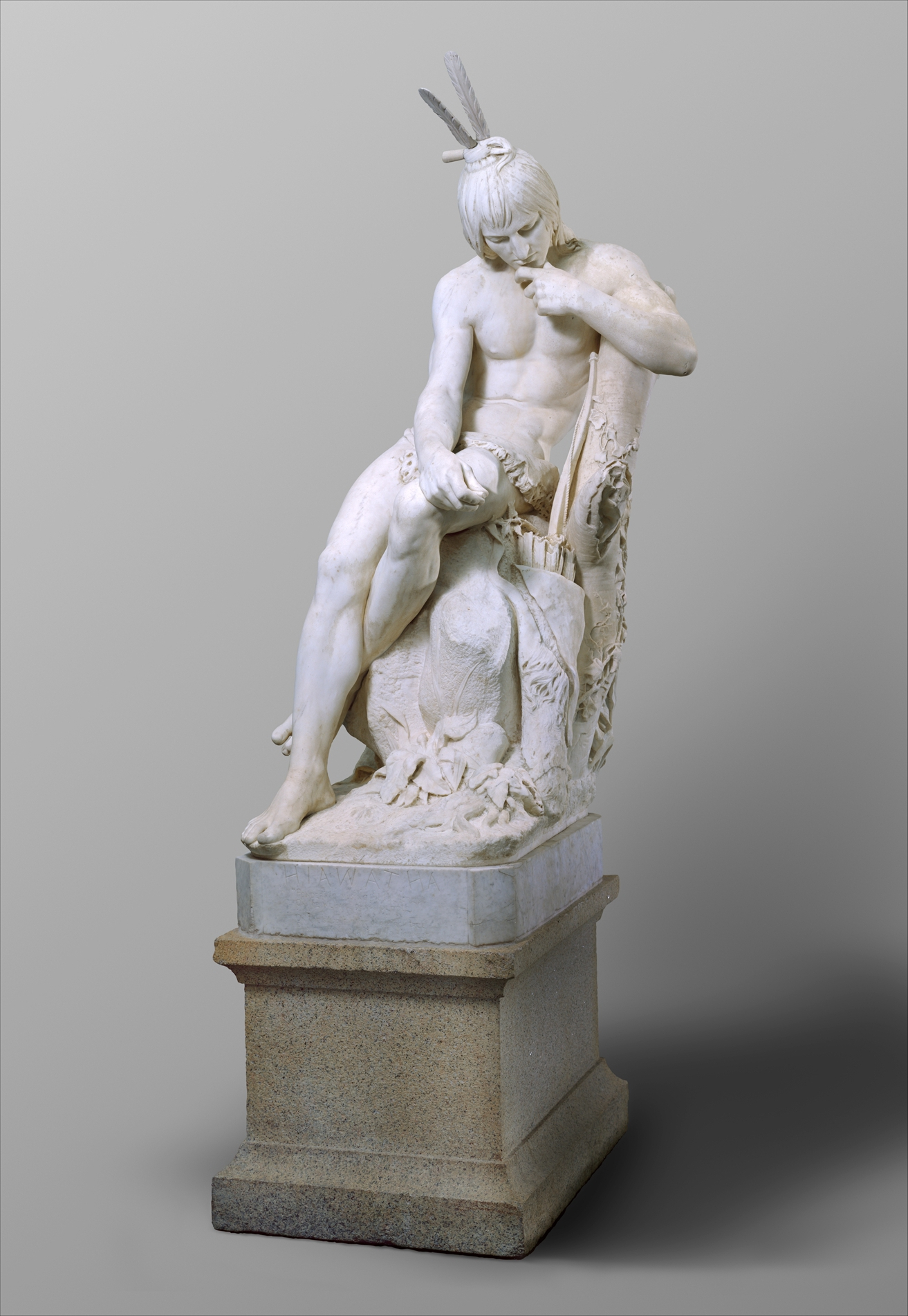
- Year: 1872-1874
- Medium: marble
- Dimensions: 152.4 cm × 87.6 cm × 94.6 cm (60.0 in × 34.5 in × 37.2 in)
- Location: Metropolitan Museum of Art; New York City

Hiawatha is a 19th-century sculpture executed in marble by American sculptor Augustus Saint-Gaudens. The work, which depicts the Iroquois leader Hiawatha, is in the collection of the Metropolitan Museum of Art.

== Description ==
Augustus Saint-Gaudens sculpted his interpretation of the famed Iroquois leader between 1872 and 1874. He was inspired to create the work by The Song of Hiawatha, an 1855 epic poem by poet Henry Wadsworth Longfellow. Longfellow's poem was well received by American audiences, and the epic work resulted in a rekindling of interest in Hiawatha and the waxing days of the Iroquois Confederacy. The poem is itself reflected on Saint-Gauden's sculpture, as the line “pondering, musing in the forest /On the welfare of his people/On the smooth Bark of a birch tree/Painted many shapes and figures” is inscribed on the base of the work, and said excerpt is directly reflected in the sculpture's pose.
