= Homer Saint-Gaudens =

American art museum director (1880–1953)

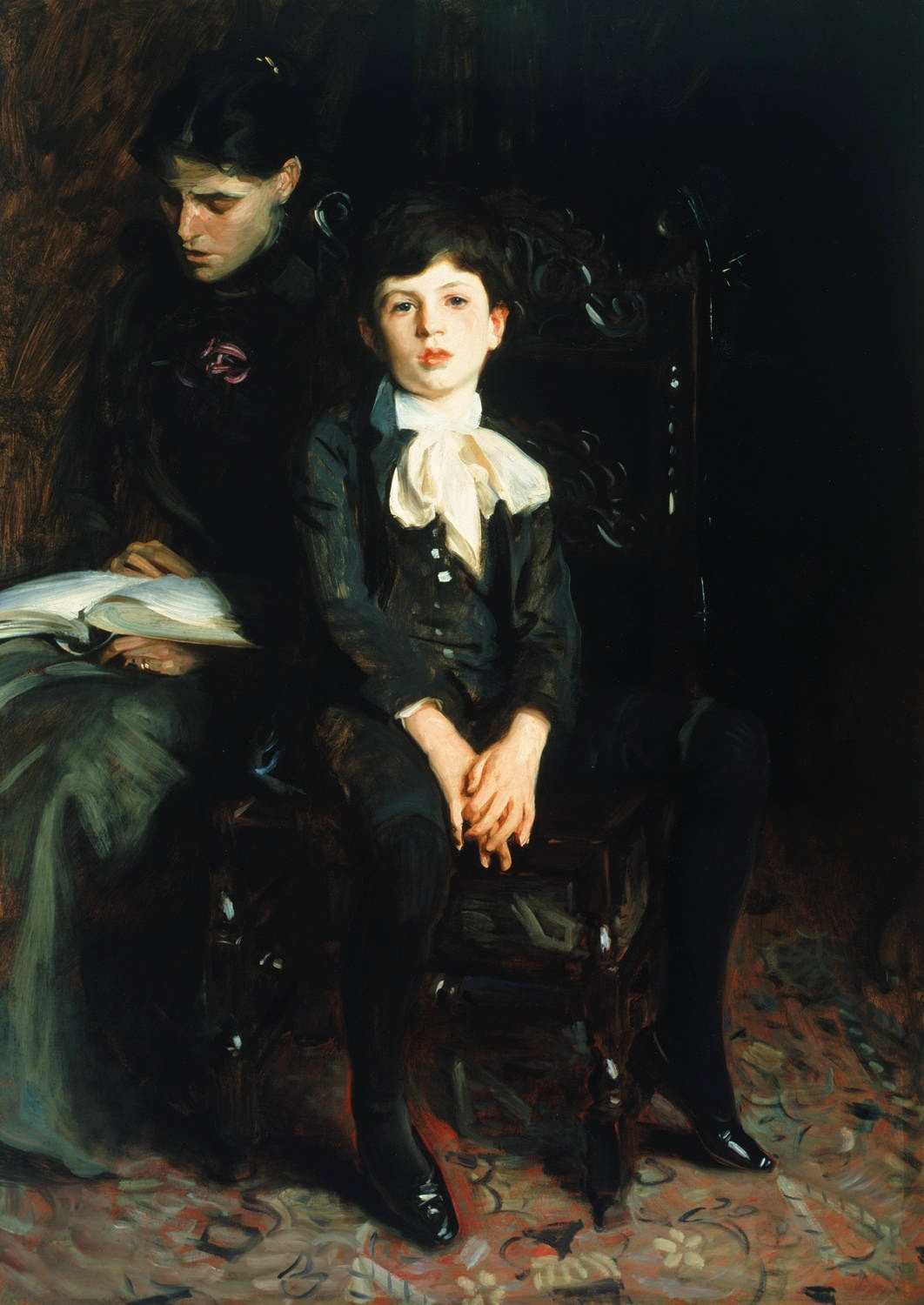
Portrait of Homer Saint-Gaudens and his mother by John Singer Sargent, 1890.

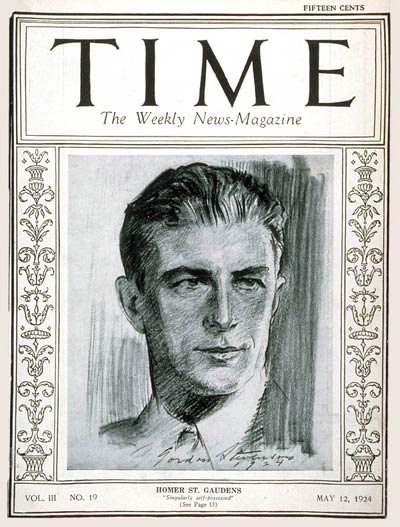
Time cover, 12 May 1924

Homer Schiff Saint-Gaudens (1880–1953) was the only child of sculptor Augustus Saint-Gaudens and his wife Augusta (née Homer). He served as the director of the Art Museum of the Carnegie Institute and was a founder of the Saint-Gaudens Memorial, a non-profit organization that maintained the family home as a museum before its donation to the National Park Service in 1965.

Saint-Gaudens was instrumental in the formation of the American Camouflage Corps in 1917; another leader was Saint-Gaudens' roommate at Harvard, Barry Faulkner. With the unit formalized as Company A of the 40th Engineers, Saint-Gaudens commanded the Corps as Captain when they sailed to Europe on January 4, 1918, and deployed to battlefield service.

In 1905, he married Carlota Dolley, a student at the Pennsylvania Academy of Fine Arts and later a painter of miniatures. They had three children: Augustus, Carlota, and Harold. Saint-Gaudens was featured on the cover of Time magazine for its 12 May 1924 edition, in connection with his direction and promotion of the annual Carnegie International art exhibition.

Awards and achievements
Preceded by Senator William Borah	Cover of Time Magazine; 19 May 1924	Succeeded by Henry Seidel Canby
