= Statue of David Farragut (New York City) =

Sculpture in Manhattan, New York, U.S.

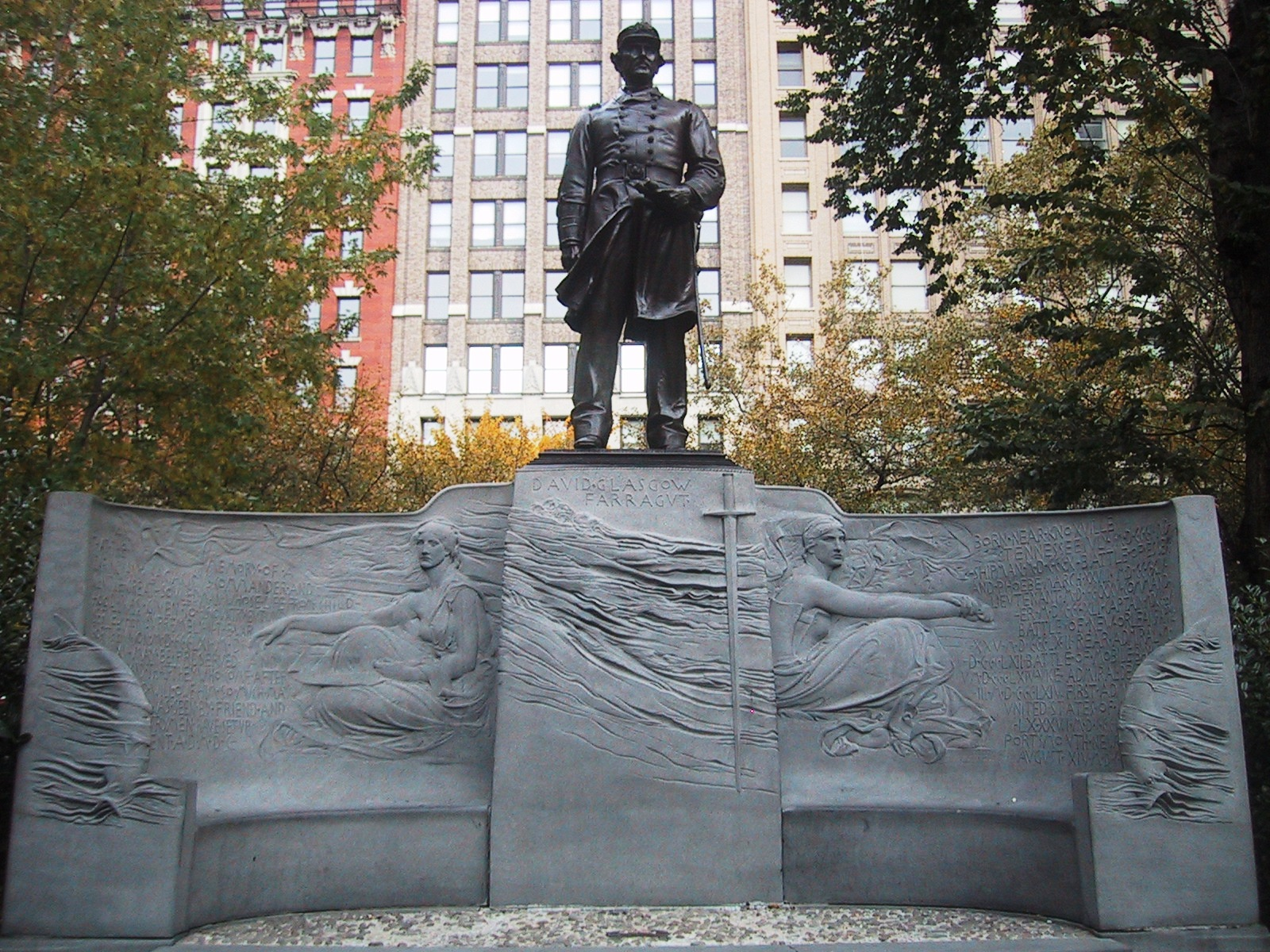
- The monument in 2006
- Artist: Augustus Saint-Gaudens; Stanford White
- Year: 1881
- Type: Sculpture
- Medium: Bronze; granite
- Subject: David Farragut
- Dimensions: 251 cm (96 in)
- Location: New York City, New York, United States; 40.74277°N 73.98767°W

Admiral David Glasgow Farragut, also known as the Admiral Farragut Monument, is an outdoor bronze statue of David Farragut by Augustus Saint-Gaudens on a stone sculptural exedra designed by the architect Stanford White, installed in Manhattan's Madison Square, in the U.S. state of New York.

== Description and history ==
The statue, cast in 1880 and dedicated on May 25, 1881, is set on a Coopersburg, Pennsylvania black granite pedestal. The work depicts Farragut, the noted United States Navy admiral of the Civil War, standing in naval uniform with binoculars and sword; the statue rests upon a plinth and then a pedestal, surrounded by a semicircular, winged exedra, which features a bas-relief figure of a seated female on either side.

The Farragut statue was Saint-Gaudens's first major work and as a result certain rumors and allegations arose. Sculptor Truman Bartlett found the work "better than anyone who knew him expected" and so began a "campaign to slur and slang him," suggesting that the statue had in fact been made by sculptors in Paris. The statue was cast in Paris by Adolphe Gruet.

The inscription on the base was composed by Stanford White's father, Richard Grant White, and reads as follows:

West Exedra: That the memory of a daring and sagacious commander and gentle great-souled man whose life from childhood was given to his country but who served her supremely in the War for the Union 1861-1865 may be preserved and honored and that they who come after him and who will owe him so much may see him as he was seen by friend and foe his countrymen have set up this monument A.D. 1881.

East Exedra: Born near Knoxville, Tennessee, July 5, 1801. Midshipman 1810. Battle of Essex and Phoebe March 28, 1814. Lieutenant 1825. Commander 1841. Captain 1855. Battle of New Orleans April 25, 1862. Rear Admiral 1862. Battle of Mobile Bay August 5, 1864. Vice Admiral December 23, 1864. First Admiral of the United States of America July 26, 1866. Died at Portsmouth, New Hampshire, August 14, 1870.

John Dryfhout wrote of the inscriptions and the base that the "intermingling of natural forms of sinuous linearity with ideal reliefs and symbols, is notable as the first expression of a form of American art nouveau." The original bluestone base, likely carved by Saint-Gaudens or his brother Louis, weathered badly and was replaced by the current granite base as a Works Project Administration project during the 1930s. The earlier base was moved to Saint-Gaudens National Historical Park in Cornish, New Hampshire.

== Study ==
A bronze bust that is a study for the sculpture is in the Metropolitan Museum of Art.

== See also ==
- 1881 in art
