= The Closing Era =

Statue in Denver, Colorado, U.S.

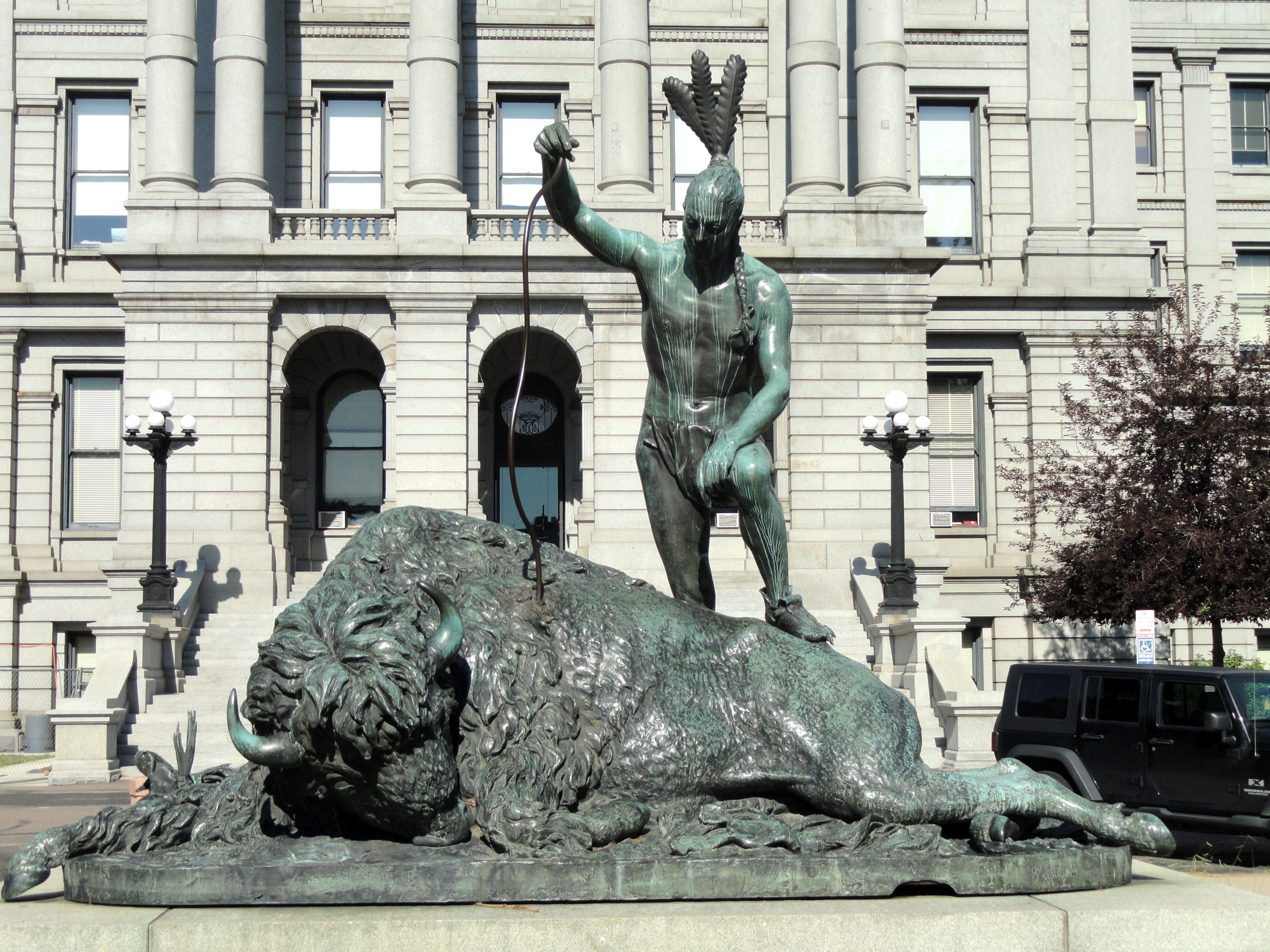
- The statue in 2011
- Medium: Bronze sculpture
- Location: Denver, Colorado, U.S.
- Coordinates: 39.739235°N 104.983983°W

The Closing Era is a bronze sculpture of a Native American hunter standing over a dying bison, installed on the East side of the Colorado State Capitol in Denver. The statue was created by Preston Powers, the son of famous sculptor Hiram Powers and "represents the end of the traditional lifestyle of Native Americans in Colorado". It was originally created in 1893 for the World's Columbian Exposition in Chicago and subsequently donated to the state of Colorado and erected on a granite base. The base originated from Cotopaxi in Fremont County, Colorado. Powers commissioned a poem from John Greenleaf Whittier for the base of the statue.

The original idea came from real estate investors who wanted to commission a sandstone statue to lure newcomers to the Perry Park area of Denver. When the idea did not materialize, a group called the "Fortnightly Club" under the leadership of Mrs. E. M. Ashley and Eliza Routt determined the same idea would be a good addition to the Colorado State's exhibit at the 1893 World's Fair Exposition in Chicago. The group commissioned Powers to create the sculpture in bronze instead of sandstone.

== Base poem ==
The poem at the base reads:

The mountain eagle from his snow-locked peaks

For the wild hunter and the bison seeks,

In the chang'd world below; and find alone

Their graven semblance, in the eternal stone.

== Vandalism ==
In August, 2015, the bow being held by the Native American was stolen but later recovered. According to police spokeswoman Christine Downs, the bow was "discovered tossed over the District 2 police station fence" on September 2, 2015, which is approximate five miles away.
