= Elsie Ward =

American sculptor

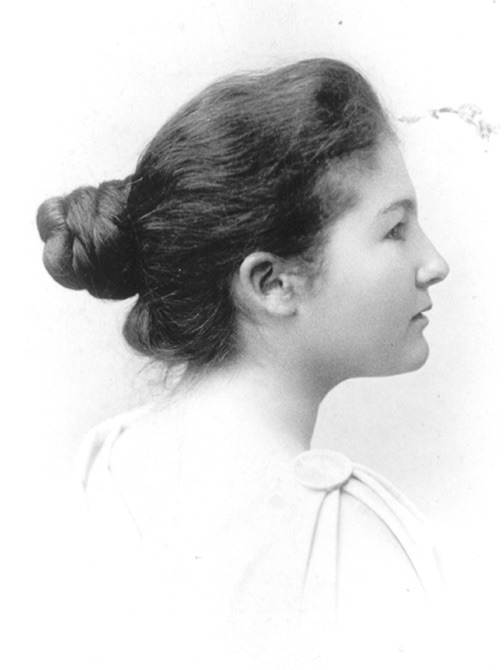
- Profile picture of Elsie Ward provided by her family
- Born: Elsie Ward; 1871; Fayette, Missouri, US
- Died: January 12, 1923; New York City, US
- Known for: Sculpture
- Movement: Art Nouveau
- Spouse: Henry Hering (m. 1910)

Elsie Ward (also known as Elsie Ward Hering) (1871–1923) was an American sculptor born in Fayette, Missouri. Her collection largely consists of bronze and other metal sculptures. Ward worked on a host of diverse works of art, but "her specialty was portraits, busts, and reliefs".

== Life ==
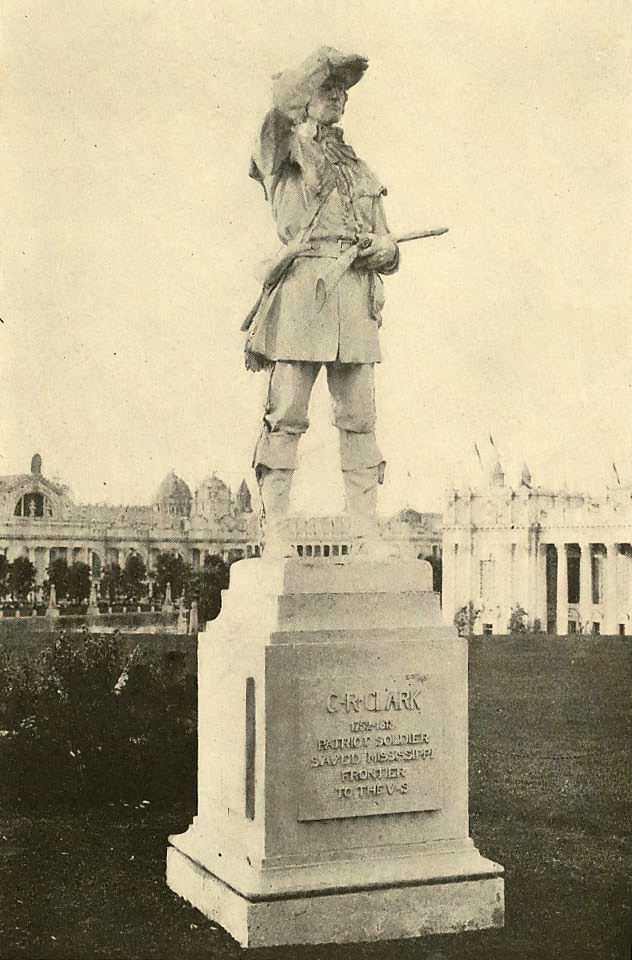
George Rogers Clark, 1904

Ward grew up on a farm where she first started experimenting with clay, modeling her pets and peers. After her family moved to Denver, Colorado around 1887, Ward graduated from high school in 1889 and began studying art with artists such as Preston Powers, Ida M. Stair, Samuel Richards and Henry Read. From the time she graduated high school until she moved again to New York, Ward was involved in the Denver Woman's Club, the Denver School of Fine Arts, the Denver Art Association, and the Denver Artists Club.

== Career ==
In New York, Ward joined the Art Student's League and studied under Augustus St. Gaudens, Daniel Chester French, and Siddons Mowbray. Around 1898, Ward traveled to Paris where she created the Boy and Frog sculpture that was later awarded a medal at the 1904 St. Louis Worlds Fair. Before moving back to Denver in 1900, Ward also entered a piece for an exhibition at the Society of American Artists in Paris.

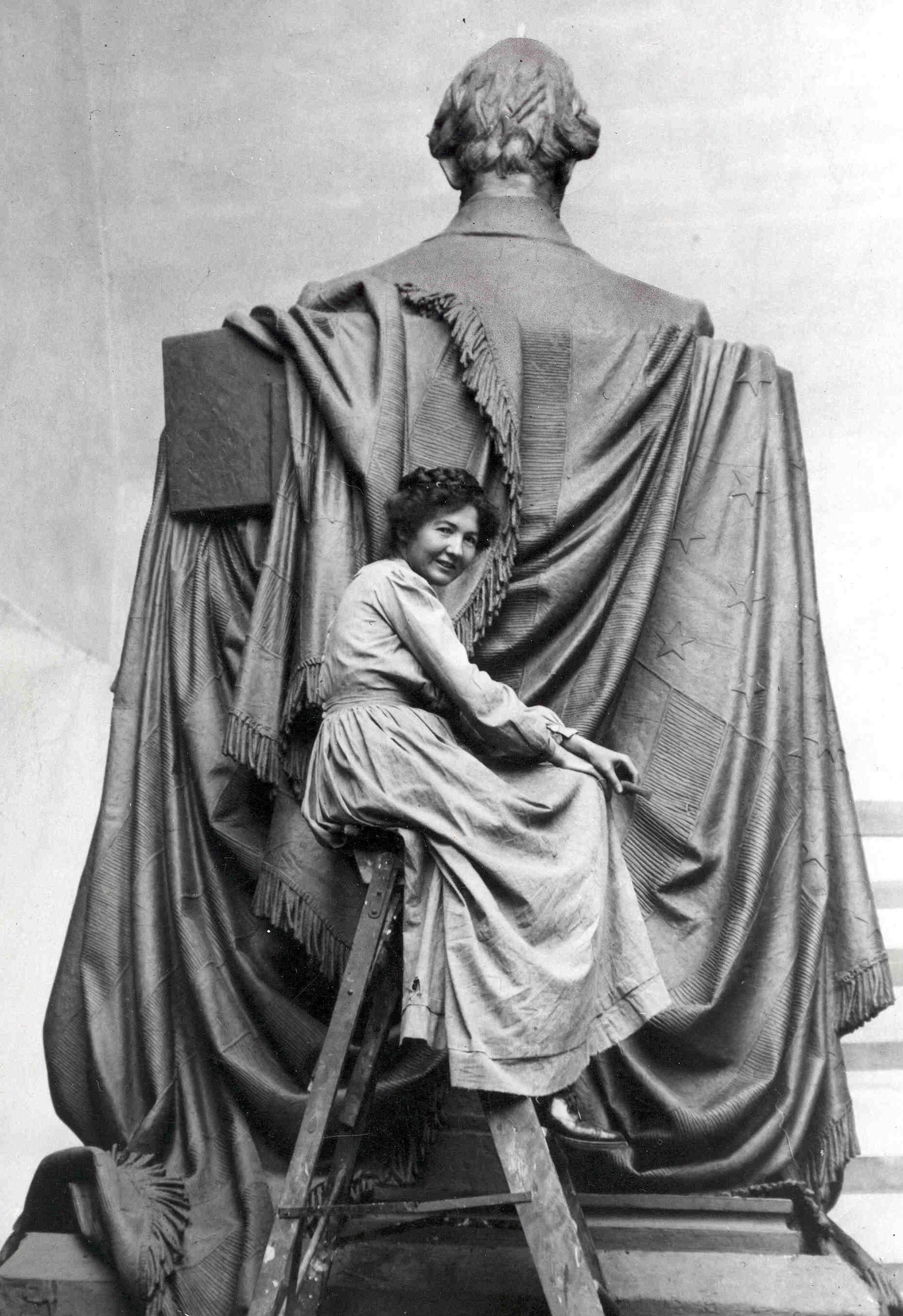
Elsie Ward working on Saint-Gaudens, Abraham Lincoln: The Head of State also known as the Seated Lincoln in Chicago

At the request of her previous mentor, Augustus St. Gaudens, Ward began work at his studio in Cornish, New Hampshire. Ward produced a number of her works at this point in her life, including Mother and Child and The Huguenot, both prize-winning pieces in the Charleston Exposition in 1902.

In 1904, there was a fire in Saint-Gaudens' studio and only the sculpted head of Irish politician Charles Stewart Parnell, for the Parnell Monument commission in Ireland, was saved. According to the National Park Service, Ward "dragged a ladder to the side of the completely clay model and wrestled the head off. This quick action saved the most important part of the piece from the flames in an otherwise major setback."

After her mentor, St. Gaudens died in 1907, Ward finished many of the pieces he was commissioned to create including the Baker Memorial in Mount Kisco, New York and a monument for Marcus A. Hanna in Cleveland, Ohio. Additionally, "Ward was responsible for much of the work on the sculpture, Seated Lincoln (1897-1906) and the Baker tomb (1906-7)."

Ward then moved back to Denver, Colorado and married her husband, Henry Hering, in June 1910. After she married Henry, Elsie Ward took his last name and became Elsie Ward Hering. "After her marriage to Henry Hering in 1910, she seldom worked independently but assisted her husband on his projects."

Ward continued to create art pieces after leaving the St. Gaudens studio. One of her last known works is a baptismal font that was finished in 1917 and was erected in St. George's Church in New York City. "Until her death in 1923, she was a deserving sculptor of statues great and small, including portraits and statues for public spaces." She died at the Memorial Hospital in Manhattan, New York, on January 12, 1923.

== Works ==
- Portrait reliefs of her Mother, Alice Talbot Ward, and others
- Chapel of Our Saviour, Denver, Colorado
- The Fountain of the Women's Christian Temperance Union, St. Louis, Missouri
- Schermerhorn Memorial Font, Denver, Colorado
- The Huguenot for the 1901-2 South Carolina Inter-State and West Indian Exposition.
- Boy and Frog, 1904, This work won the bronze medal at the 1904 St. Louis Exposition and copies are located at both Brookgreen Gardens and the Denver Botanic Gardens.

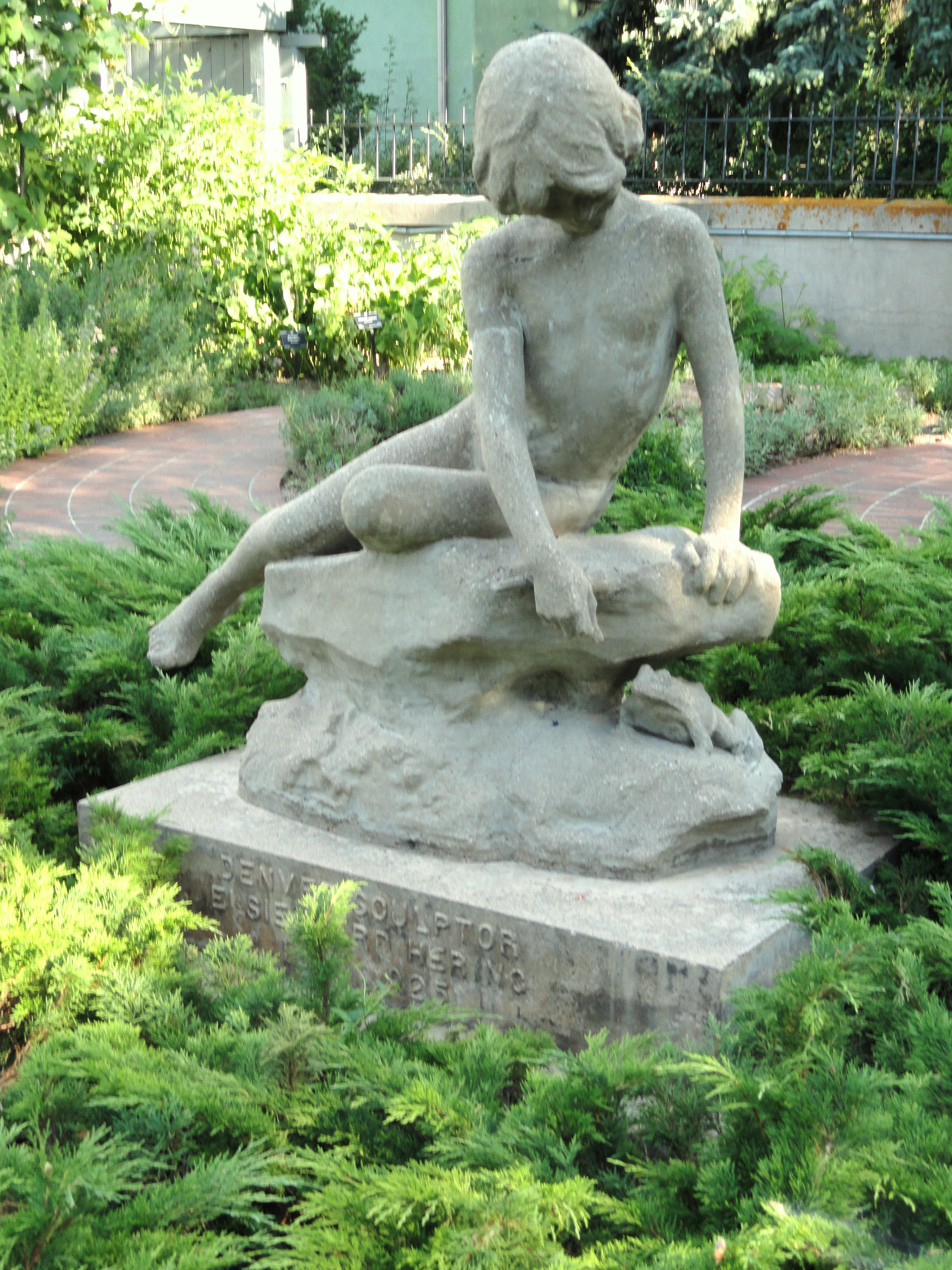
Boy and Frog, Denver Botanical Gardens

- Statue of frontiersman, George Rogers Clark, 1904, for the Louisiana Purchase Exposition, that was later permanently erected in St. Louis.
