= Abraham Lincoln: The Head of State =

Bronze statue in Chicago

Coordinates: 41°52′38.24″N 87°37′17.47″W

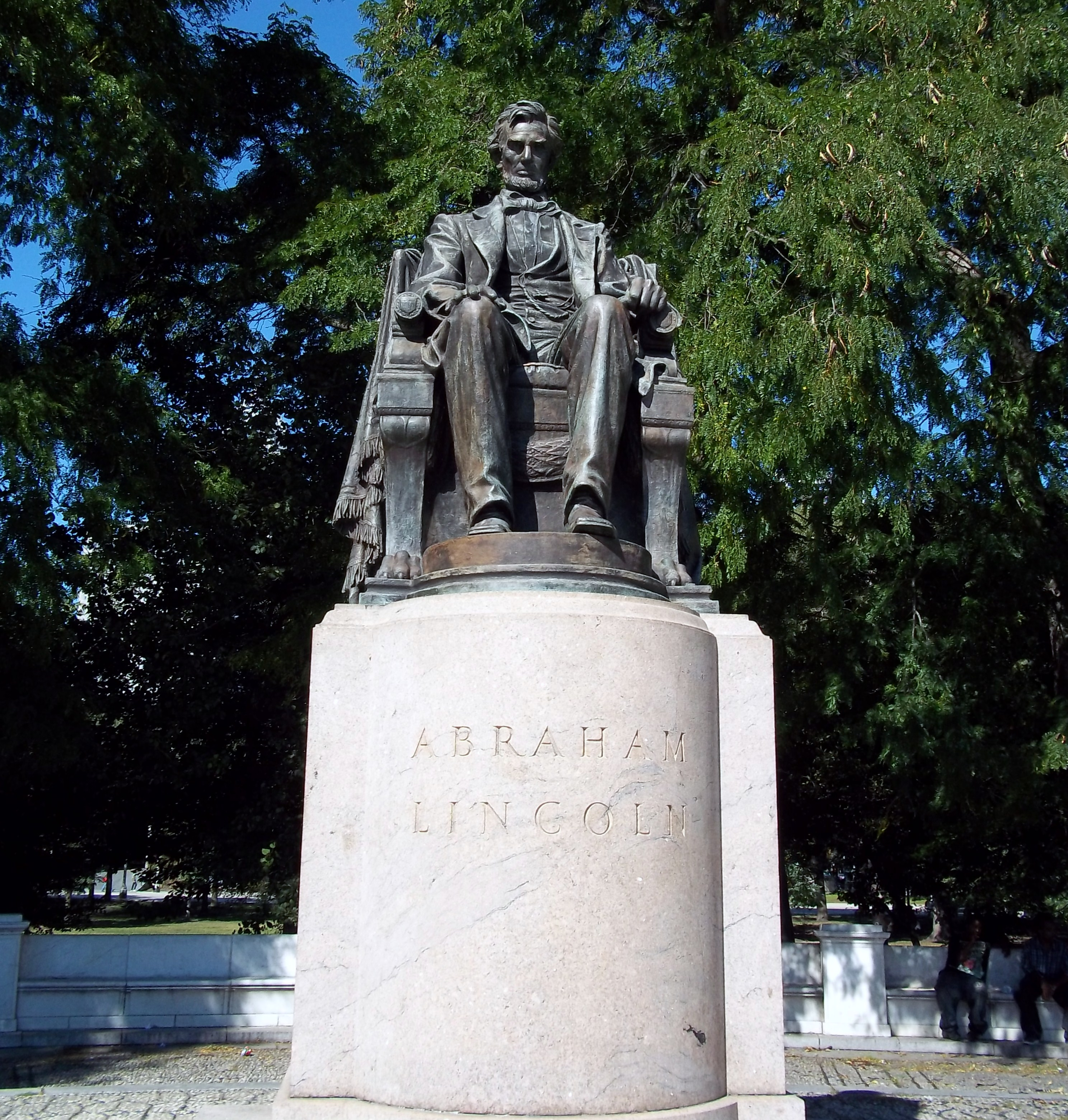
- Artist: Augustus Saint-Gaudens
- Year: 1908
- Location: Grant Park, Chicago

Abraham Lincoln: The Head of State (also called Seated Lincoln or Sitting Lincoln) is a 9-foot (2.7 m) tall bronze statue of Abraham Lincoln in Grant Park, in Chicago. Created by Augustus Saint-Gaudens and completed by his workshop in 1908, it was intended by the artist to evoke the loneliness and burden of command felt by Lincoln during his presidency. The sculpture depicts a contemplative Lincoln seated in an elaborately draped chair, and gazing down into the distance. The sculpture is set upon a pedestal and a 150-foot (46 m) wide exedra designed by architect Stanford White.

Although not as well known as Saint-Gaudens' Standing Lincoln (in Lincoln Park), it does demonstrate the years of attention that the sculptor gave to capturing Lincoln in a most somber light. Prior to being installed in Grant Park in 1926, the sculpture was displayed at the Metropolitan Museum of Art in New York City and at the San Francisco World's Fair in 1915. The section of Grant Park, where this statue of Lincoln is located, was designated as the Court of Presidents in the plan for the park but, to date, this is the only such monument that has been erected.

== History ==
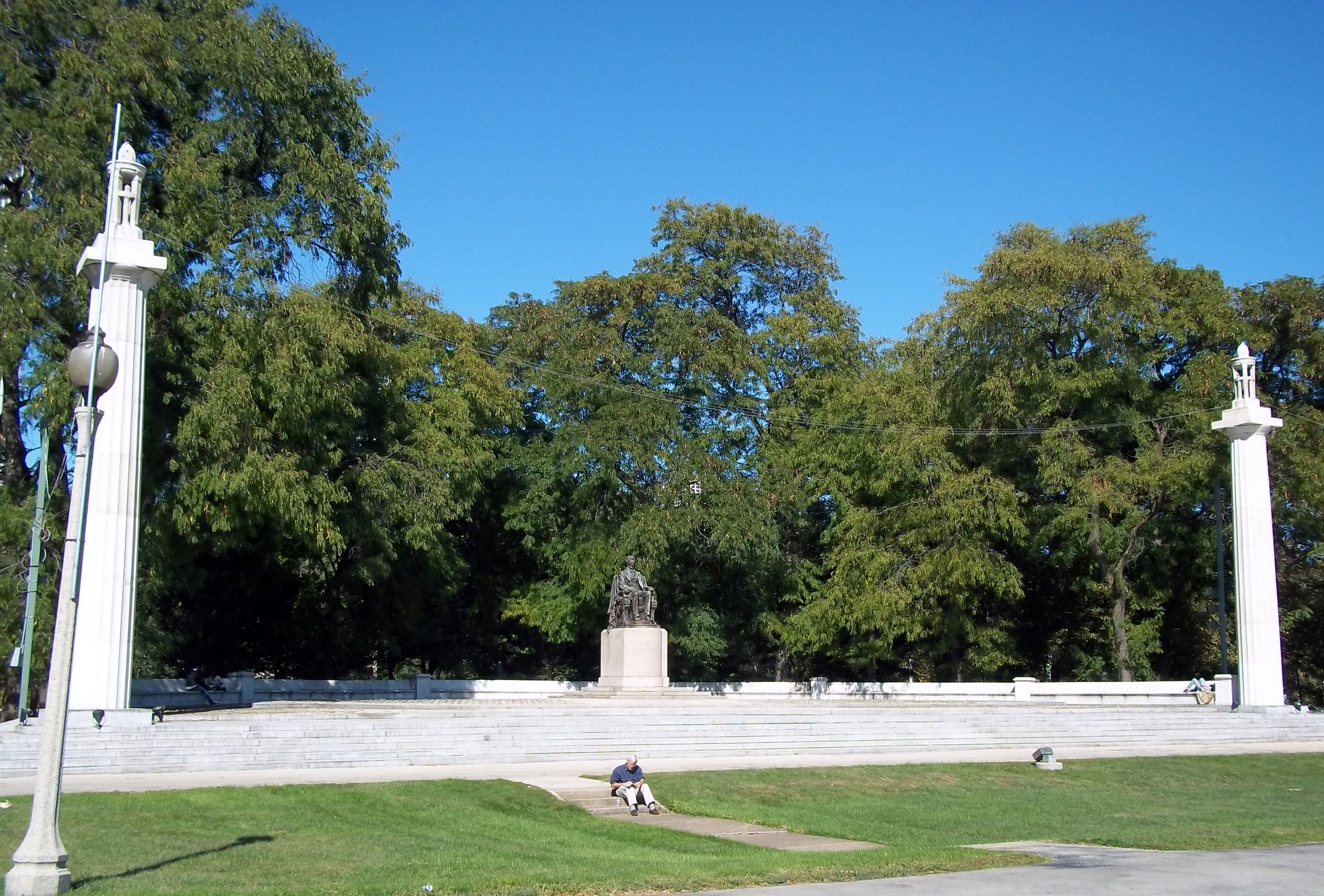
Wide view of exedra

In his will, the industrialist John Crerar bequeathed funds for the creation and maintenance of a free public library in Chicago to be called the John Crerar Library. He also bequeathed $100,000 (roughly equivalent to $3,583,333.3 today) to his executors, Norman Williams and Huntington W Jackson, for the erection of a "colossal statue of Abraham Lincoln" at a location of their choosing. Crerar died in 1889, and in 1897 Saint-Gaudens was commissioned to sculpt the statue. In 1901 the Chicago city council approved an act for the construction of the John Crerar Library in Grant Park on a site bounded by Michigan Avenue, the Illinois Central railroad tracks, Monroe Avenue and Madison Street (the site of the Crown Fountain today). The act also allowed the trustees of the money bequeathed by Crerar to construct a statue of Lincoln to place the statue within the grounds of the library.

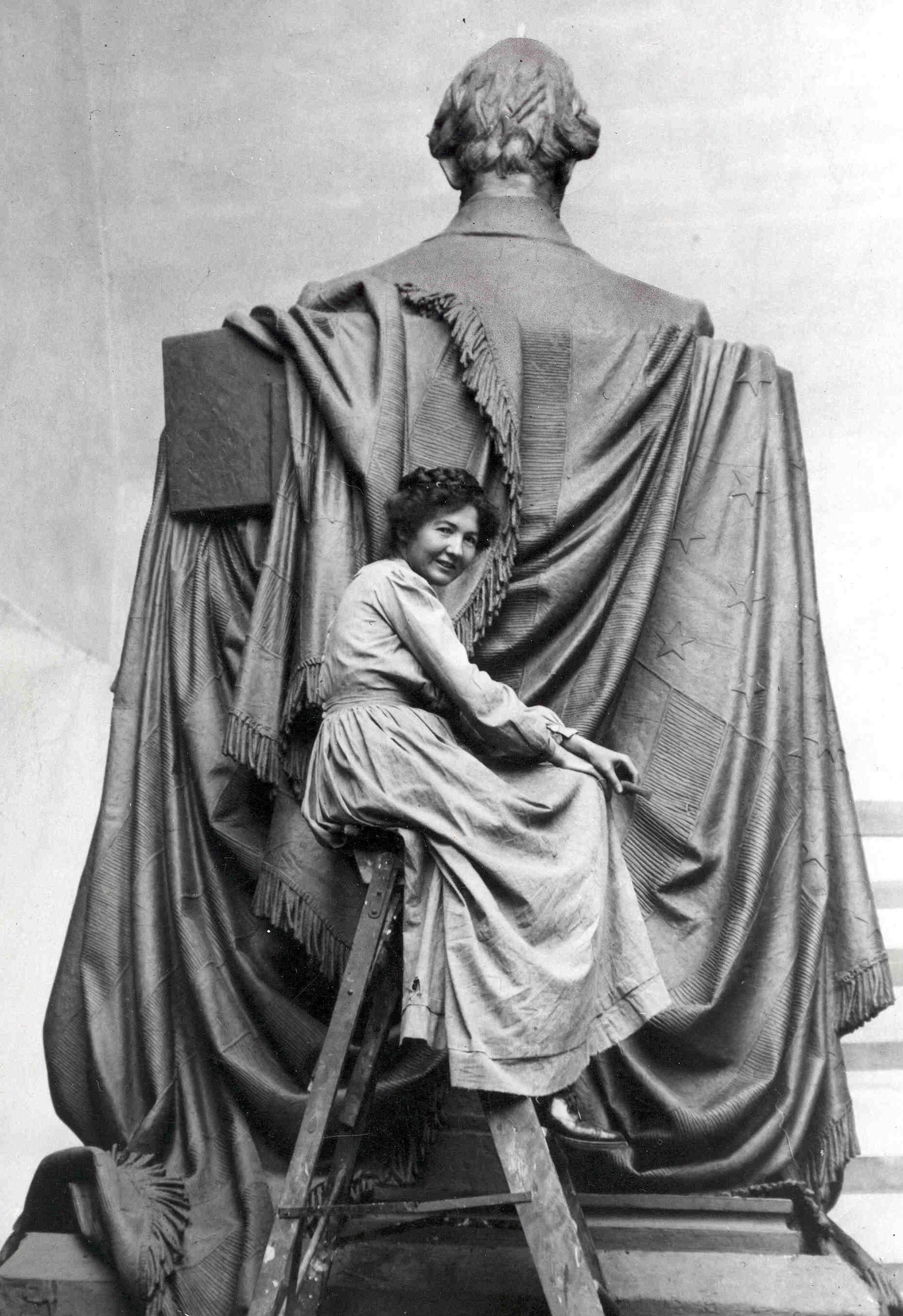
Saint-Gauden's studio sculptor Elsie Ward perched on a ladder working on the draping of the statue.

A fire at Saint-Gaudens studio in 1904 destroyed all of his drawings and models for the sculpture, however Saint-Gaudens was able to complete design work and begin casting before his death in 1907. Plans to build in Grant Park were opposed by Aaron Montgomery Ward, who in 1910 won a court battle to prevent the Crerar Library and the Field Museum of Natural History from being constructed in the park. The library was instead constructed at the northwest corner of Randolph Street and Michigan Avenue. Subsequent plans for the development Grant Park called for the statue to be located on reclaimed land between Van Buren Street and Congress Parkway, but delays in the construction of the park led to the statue being stored, first at the Metropolitan Museum of Art in New York City (from 1908 to 1913) and then in a building in Washington Park.

In 1924 it was announced that the South Park Commissioners had approved a location for the statue 225 feet (69 m) east of the Illinois Central railroad tracks and north of Van Buren Street, and the statue was unveiled on May 31, 1926.

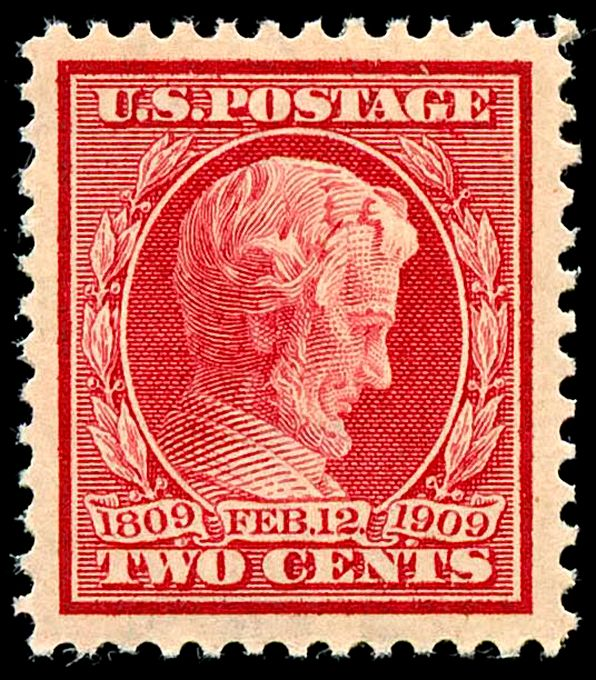

The statue's head was used for the commemorative postage stamp issued on the 100th anniversary of Lincoln's birth in 1909.

== See also ==
- List of public art in Chicago
- List of statues of Abraham Lincoln
- List of sculptures of presidents of the United States
