= Statue of Jacob Collamer =

Statue in the United States Capitol

Jacob Collamer
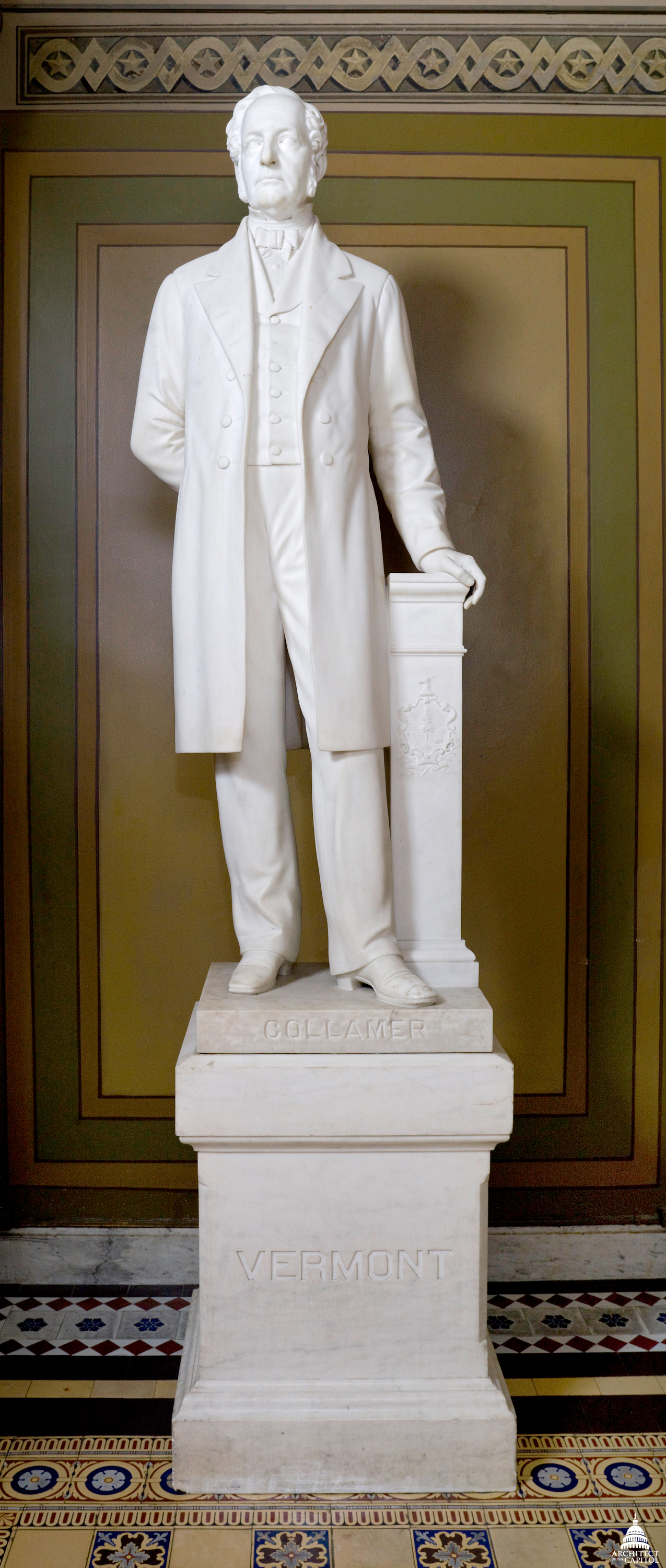
- The statue in the National Statuary Hall Collection
- Artist: Preston Powers
- Medium: Marble sculpture
- Subject: Jacob Collamer
- Location: Washington, D.C., United States

Jacob Collamer is a marble statue of Jacob Collamer by Preston Powers, installed in the United States Capitol, in Washington D.C., as part of the National Statuary Hall Collection. It is one of two statues donated by the state of Vermont. The statue was accepted in the collection by Alexander H. Stephens in 1881.
