= California (sculpture) =

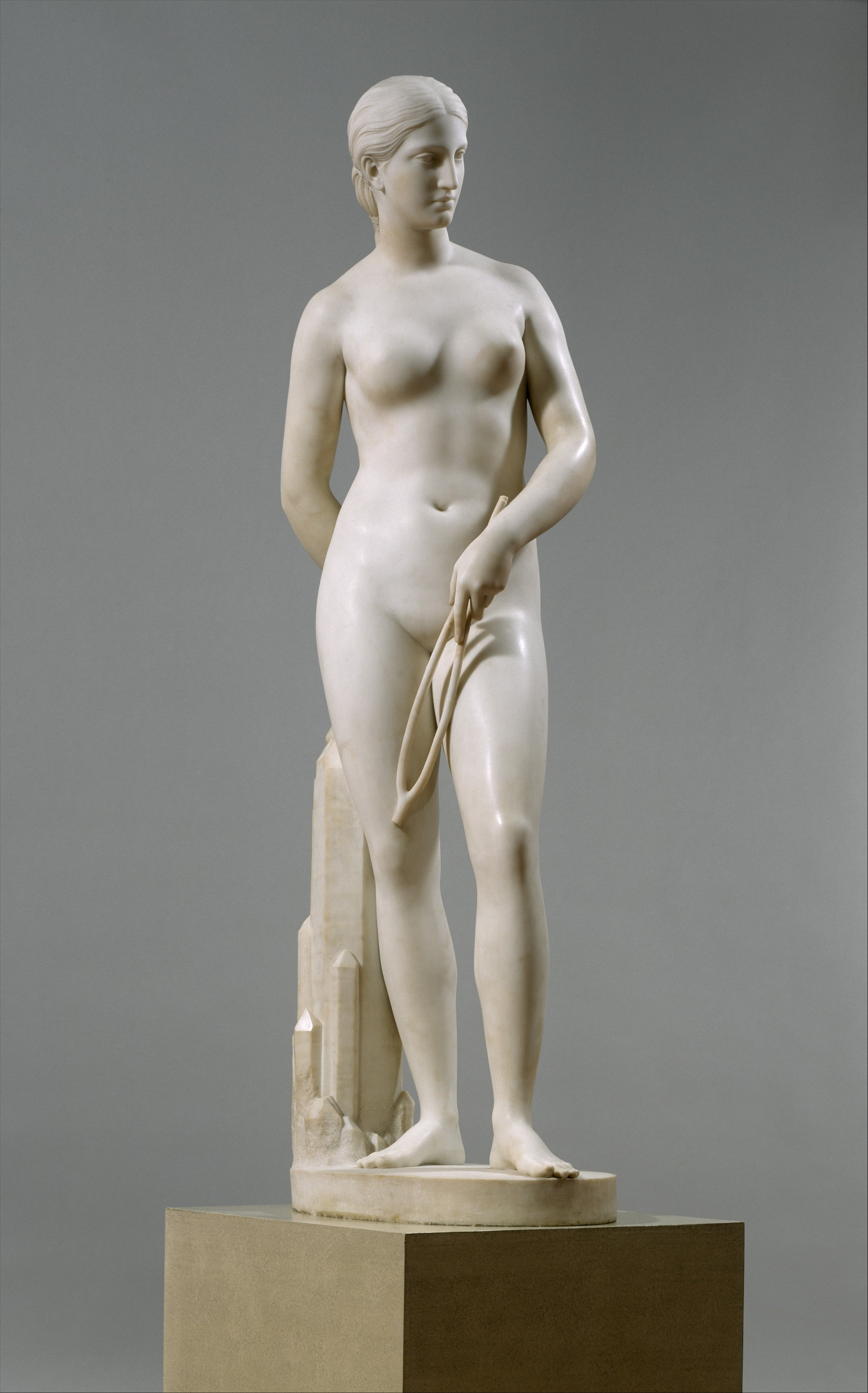
- Artist: Hiram Powers
- Year: 1858
- Medium: Marble
- Dimensions: 180.3 cm × 46.4 cm (71.0 in × 18.3 in); 62.9 cm diameter (24.8 in)
- Location: Metropolitan Museum of Art, New York City

California is a mid-19th century marble sculpture. Crafted by American sculptor Hiram Powers, the marble statue is an allegory for the wealth and danger of California. The sculpture, which is currently on display at the Metropolitan Museum of Art in New York City, was the first sculpture by an American artist to enter the museum's collection.

== Background ==
During the mid-19th century, the use of nude female sculptures as allegories of places was a prevalent artistic trend. Hiram Powers, already famed for his sculpture The Greek Slave, began to work on producing a statue to encapsulate the spirit of the then-ongoing California Gold Rush. Powers was enthusiastic about the project, and began work on the sculpture before he had secured funding. Powers initially planned to place the completed sculpture at Sutter's Mill, where the gold flakes that sparked the gold rush had been found in early 1848.

Powers began his work on California in 1850, and by 1855 had completed a plaster casting of the future sculpture. The carving of the statue was completed by 1858. Rather than being sent to California as was originally intended, the sculpture was instead finished on commission for New York business magnate William Backhouse Astor Sr. In 1872 Astor gifted the statue to the newly-established Metropolitan Museum of Art in New York City, where it became the first sculpture executed by an American artist in the museum's collection.

== Description ==
California was carved by Powers in the form of young woman. She holds a divining rod (a tool purportedly able to detect gold deposits) in her left hand, crossed in front of her body, while her right hand holds a branch covered with thorns. These two symbols represent both the outward opportunity and hidden dangers of pursuing the alluring lands of California. To the figure's back-right stands a column of quartz; as gold was often found among quartz deposits, the mineral's depiction represents the mineral wealth of California, both the state and the sculpture.
