= The Last of the Tribes =

Coordinates: 29.7256°N 95.3904°W

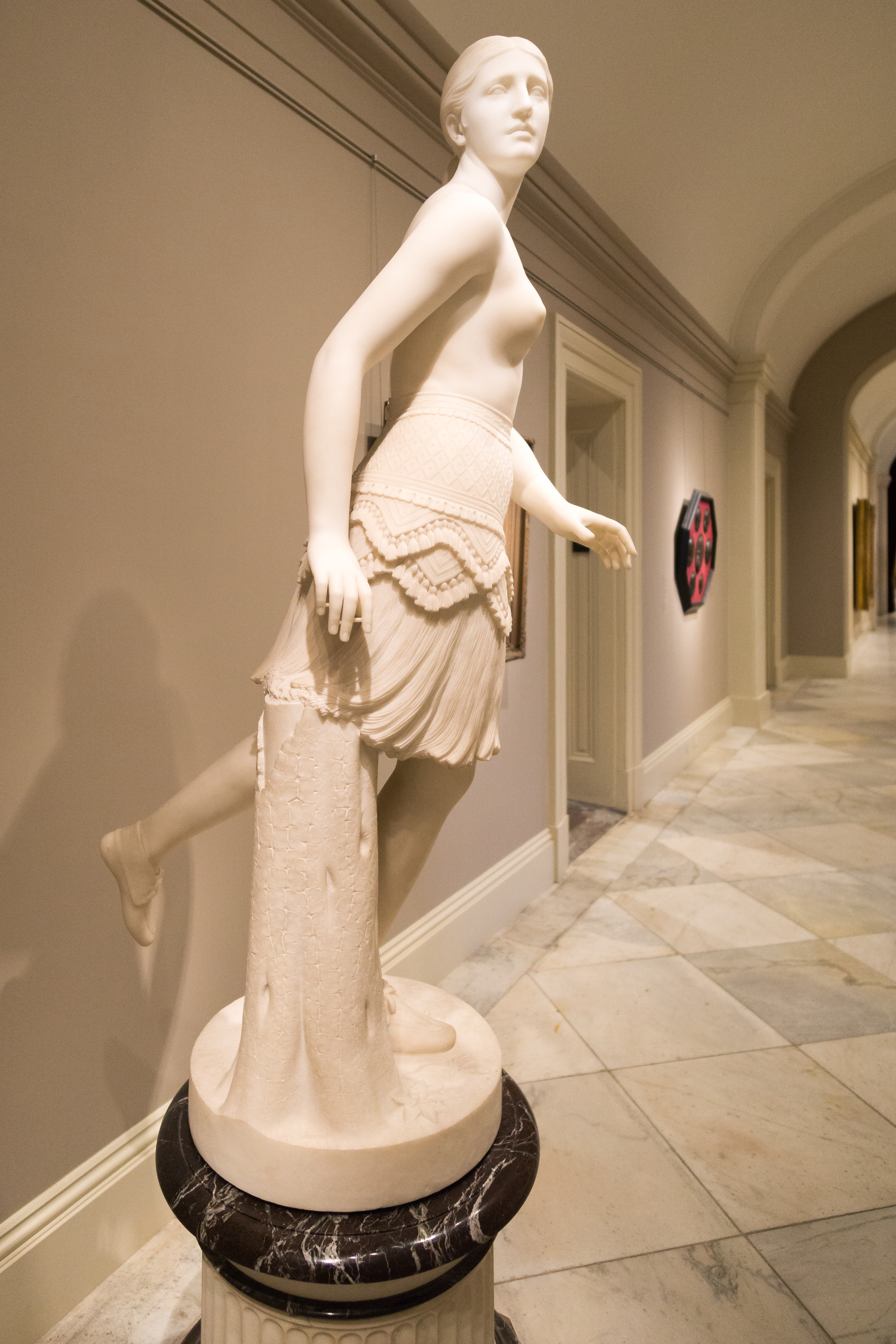
The Last of the Tribes

The Last of the Tribes is a neo-classical sculpture by Hiram Powers (1805–1873).

The sculpture was modelled between 1867 and 1872 from marble and depicts a partially nude, young Native American girl walking with her head turned slightly to one side. It was Hiram Powers' last full-length sculpture.

While Powers also produced many busts, he was noted for his full-lengths, especially his sculptures entitled Eve and The Greek Slave, both of which are nude. At the time, nude and partially nude sculptures and paintings were frowned upon and Powers received criticism for his work, but his art was and still is enjoyed by the majority of those who see it. The Last of the Tribes has been on public display at the Museum of Fine Arts, Houston since 2001.

The name of sculpture was intended to reflect a time "when the last Indian will pass away" as a result of contact with Euro-Americans, and Powers described the figure as "fleeing before civilization [and] looking back in terror."

The Last of the Tribes drew more attention when it was included as part of The United States Academic Decathlon 2003-2004 curriculum. The focus for that year was on the Lewis and Clark Expedition and Native Americans.
