= Exedra =

Semicircular niche or recess, often lined with seats

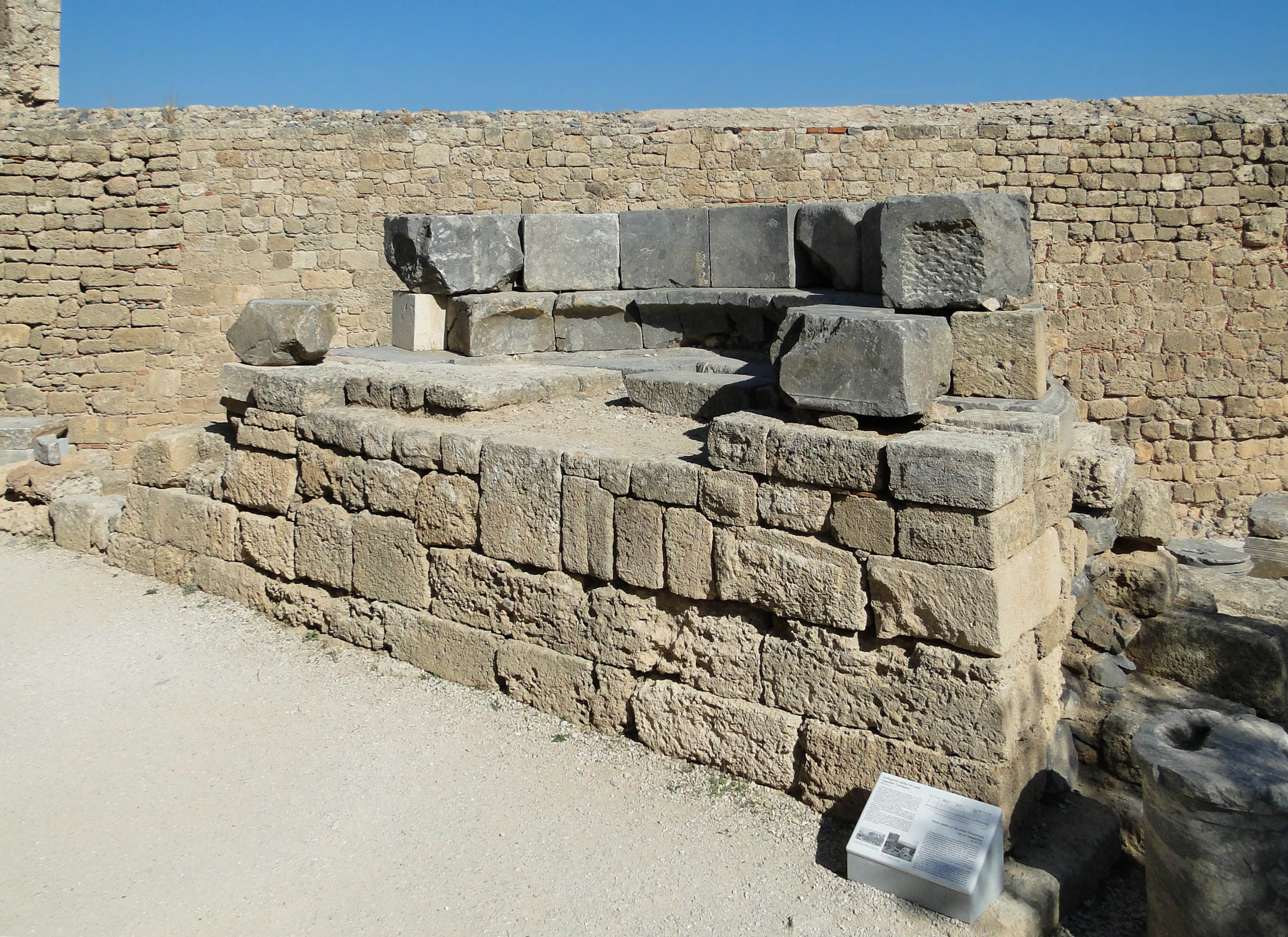
Exedra of Pamphilidas, Acropolis of Lindos, Rhodes, Greece

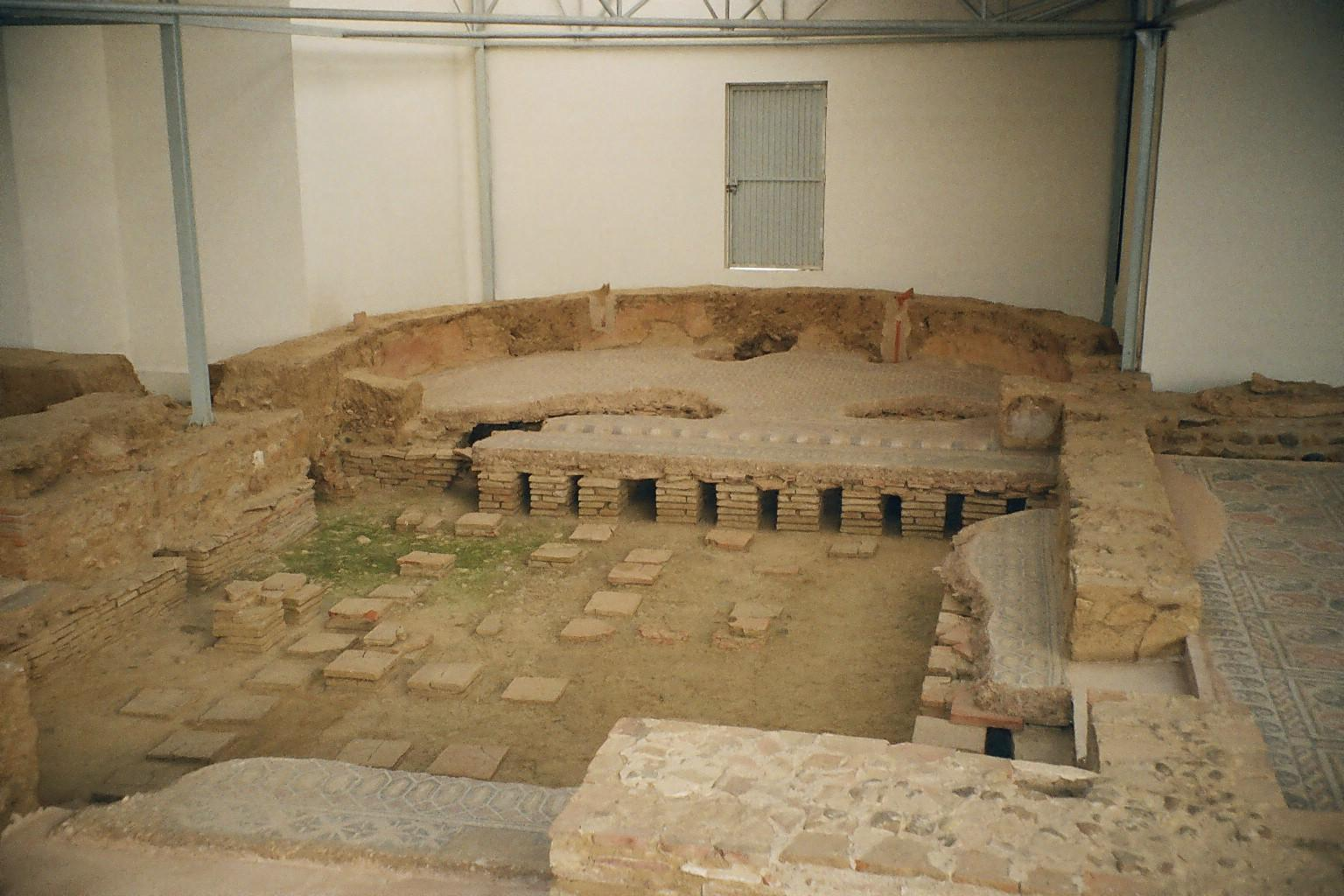
The foundations and partial floor of a late Roman villa. The floored part is the exedra. The rest of the floor has deteriorated and is missing, with only parts of the hypocaust columns remaining. Hot air circulated through the hypocaust to heat the house.

An exedra (pl. exedras or exedrae) is a semicircular architectural recess or platform, sometimes crowned by a semi-dome, and either set into a building's façade or free-standing. The original Greek word ἐξέδρα ('a seat out of doors') was applied to a room that opened onto a stoa, ringed with curved high-backed stone benches, a suitable place for conversation. An exedra may also be expressed by a curved break in a colonnade, perhaps with a semicircular seat.

The exedra would typically have an apsidal podium that supported the stone bench. The free-standing (open air) exedra, often supporting bronze portrait sculpture, is a familiar Hellenistic structure, characteristically sited along sacred ways or in open places in sanctuaries, such as at Delos or Epidaurus. Some Hellenistic exedrae were built in relation to a city's agora, as in Priene. Monument architects have also used this free-standing style in modern times.

== Rise ==
The exedra achieved particular popularity in ancient Roman architecture during the Roman Empire. In the 1st century AD, Nero's architects incorporated exedrae throughout the planning of his Domus Aurea, enriching the volumes of the party rooms, a part of what made Nero's palace so breathtakingly pretentious to traditional Romans, for no one had ever seen domes and exedrae in a dwelling before.

An exedra was normally a public feature: when rhetoricians and philosophers disputed in a Roman gymnasium it was in an exedra opening into the peristyle that they gathered. A basilica featured a large exedra at the far end from its entrance, where the magistrates sat, usually raised up several steps, in hearing cases. This was called a tribuna in Latin, and tribune is used for an area of raised floor backing onto a wall, often in an exedra.

== Later uses ==
Following precedents from Rome, exedrae continued to be in widespread use architecturally after the fall of Rome. In Byzantine architecture and Romanesque architecture, this familiar feature developed into the apse and is fully treated there.

The term exedra is still often used for secondary apses or niches in the more complicated plans of later Byzantine churches; another term is conch, named for the scallop shell form often taken by the half-dome cap. A famous use of the exedra is in Donato Bramante's Cortile del Belvedere extension of the Vatican Palace; that exedra was initially open to the sky.

In Muslim architecture, the exedra becomes a mihrab and invariably retains religious associations, wherever it is seen, even on the smallest scale, as a prayer niche.

Both Baroque and Neoclassical architecture used exedrae. Baroque architects, (for example, Pietro da Cortona in his Villa Pigneto), used them to enrich the play of light and shade and give rein to expressive volumes; Neoclassical architects, to articulate the rhythmic pacing of a wall elevation.

The interior exedra was richly exploited by Scottish neoclassical architect Robert Adam and his followers.

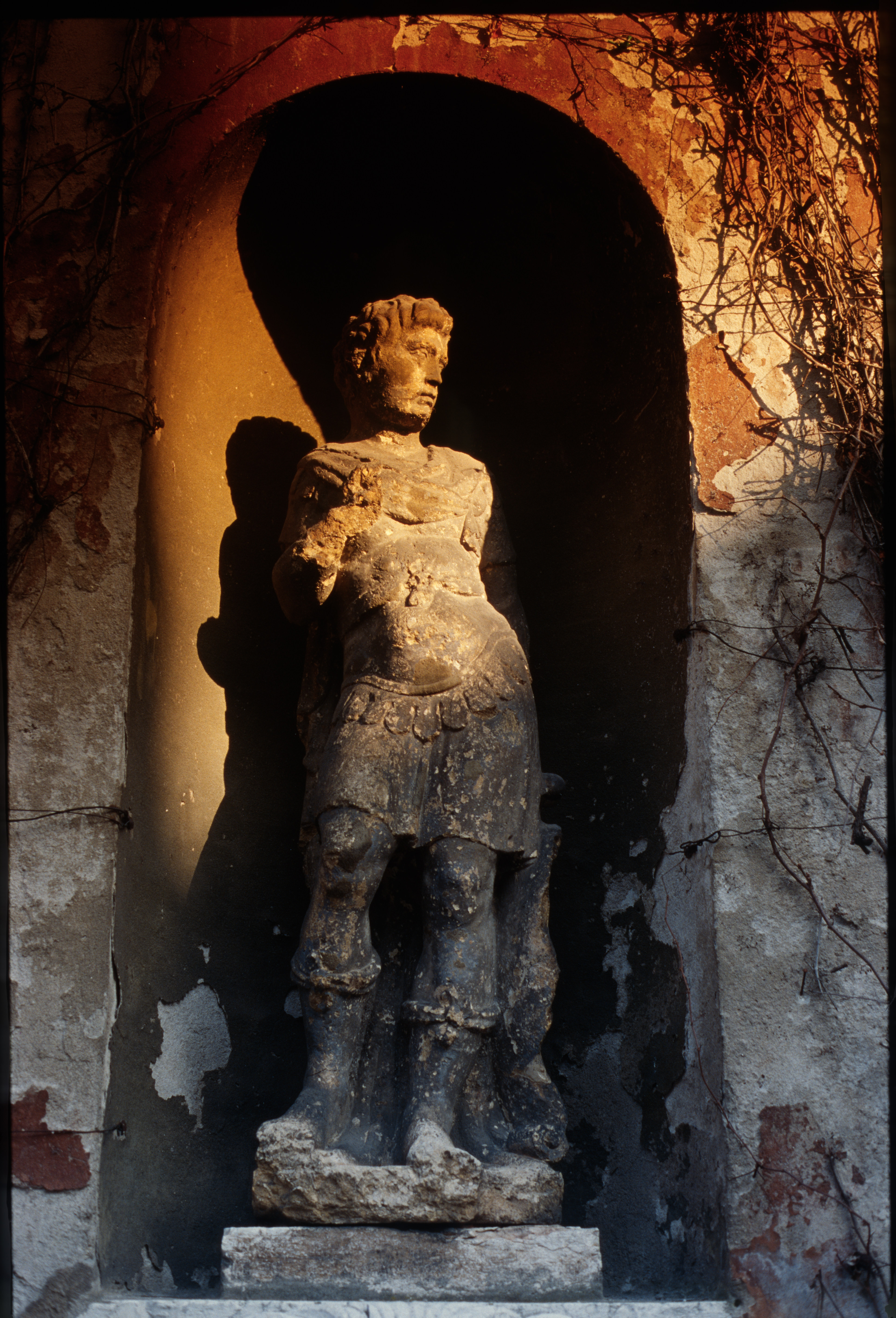
Exedra-shaped niche with a Apollo sculpture, at the Palazzo Giusti, Verona

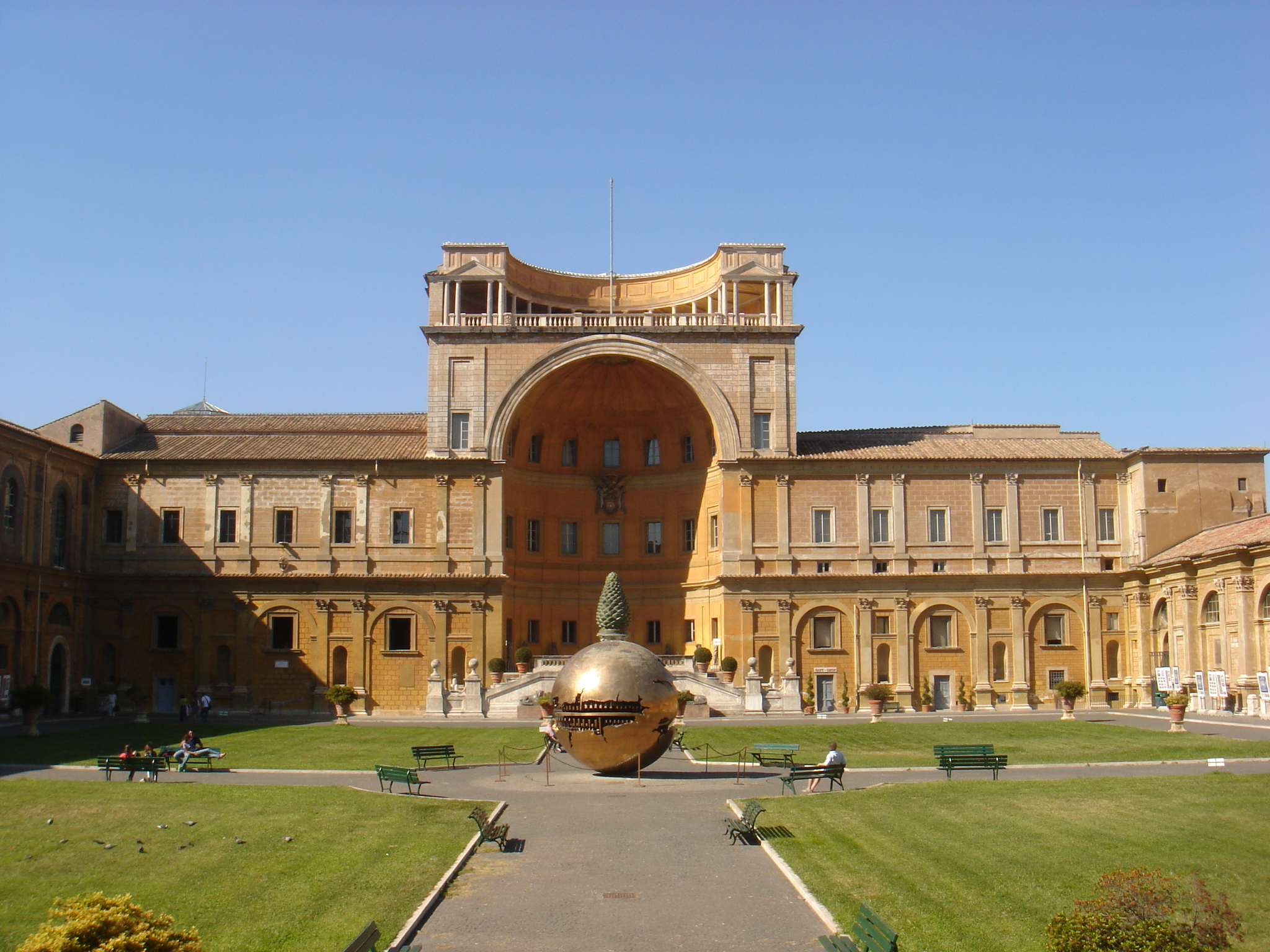
Exedra of the Cortile della Pigna, at the Vatican Palace in Rome

== Public landscapes ==
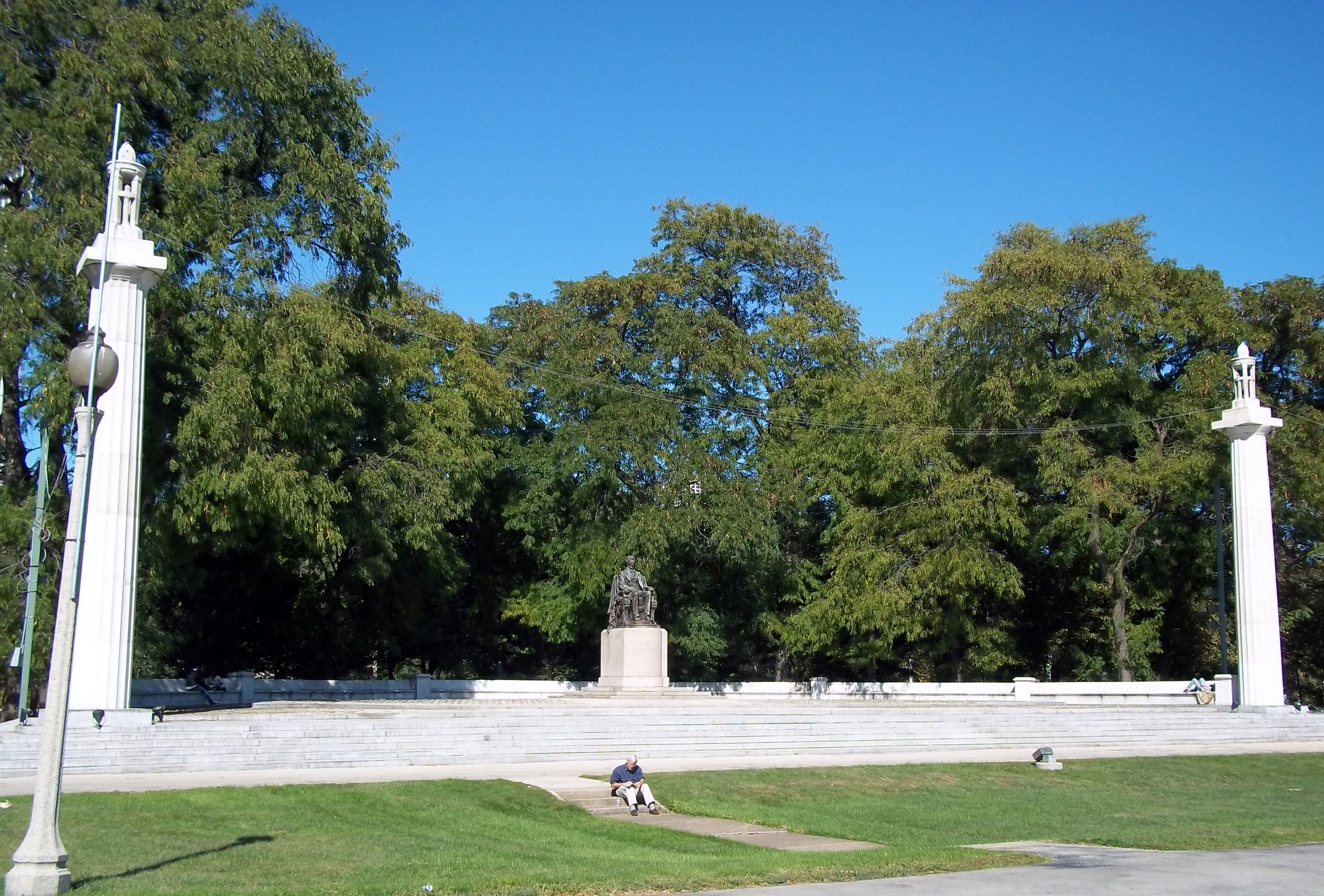
Open-air exedra with bench – the Abraham Lincoln: The Head of State monument in Grant Park, Chicago

A classic example of a Baroque exedra on a (comparatively) reduced scale within its context, is the central niche of the Trevi Fountain in Rome, sheltering a statue of Neptune.

Many classicizing bandshells in public parks are exedrae, for the shape, with its half-dome heading, reflects sound forwards. The Hollywood Bowl's shell (illus. at that entry) takes the form of the head of a gargantuan exedra, stripped of classicizing details. The Spreckels Temple of Music in Golden Gate Park in San Francisco is another example of such a free-standing classicized bandshells

Public monuments without any covering use a freestanding semicircular exedra with a bench, often to give a platform to a statue, for example at Abraham Lincoln: The Head of State monument in Grant Park (Chicago), the Houdini grave in New York, and the Signing of the Mayflower Compact Bas Relief in Provincetown, Massachusetts.

The Great Court on the urban campus of the University of Illinois at Chicago Circle (now UIC), had four modern examples of the exedra. The elevated Great Court, which served as the campus quad, had one exedra in each quadrant: two with four sections of seating facing in, one with two sections of seating facing in, and one inside-out exedra with two sections of seating facing out. In the center of the Great Court was the Circle Forum, which extended down to ground level. Designed by Walter Netsch of Skidmore, Owings & Merrill, the lack of maintenance led to disrepair and, ultimately, to being demolished.

== Gardens ==
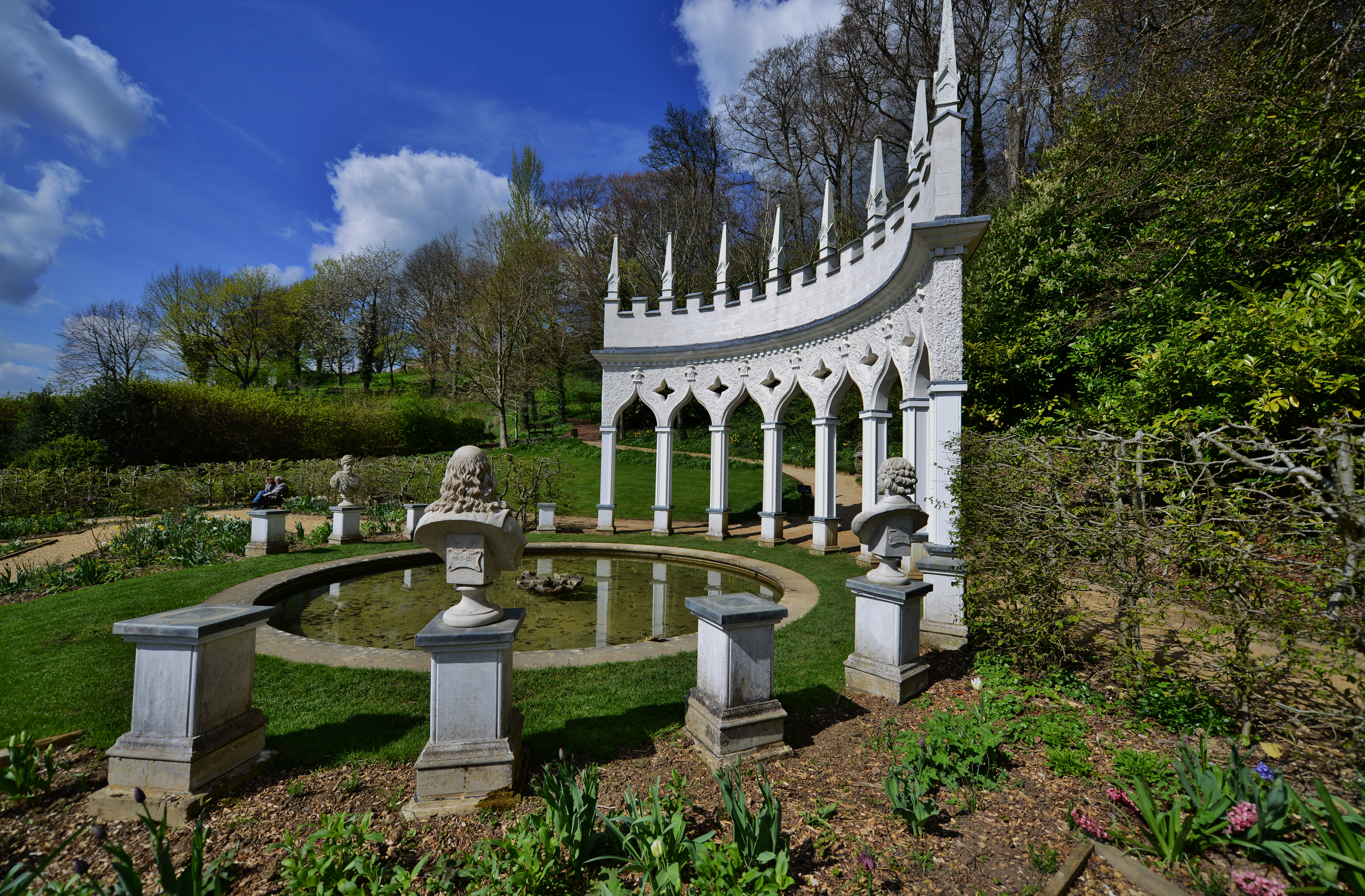
Exedra in Painswick Rococo Garden, dating from the 1740s

During the 18th century, an exedra became a popular garden feature or folly, often used as an ornamental curved screening wall to hide another part of the garden. Examples can be found at Belton House and West Wycombe Park. An exedra can be used in landscape design to visually terminate a garden axis. They can incorporate seating, a fountain, tile-work, and landscape lighting; in traditional or contemporary styles.

In New York City's Central Park, overlooking Conservatory Water, is the Waldo Hutchins bench, a curved Concord white granite exedra outdoor bench. The bench is almost 4 feet (1.2 m) tall by 27 feet (8.2 m) long, and weighs several tons. Its architect was Eric Gugler, and in 1932 it was executed by the Piccirilli Brothers studio, the firm that carved the Lincoln Memorial in Washington, D.C.

== See also ==
- Iwan – Structure in Iranian and Islamic architecture
- Niche (architecture) – Architectural recess in a wall
