= Preston Powers =

American sculptor

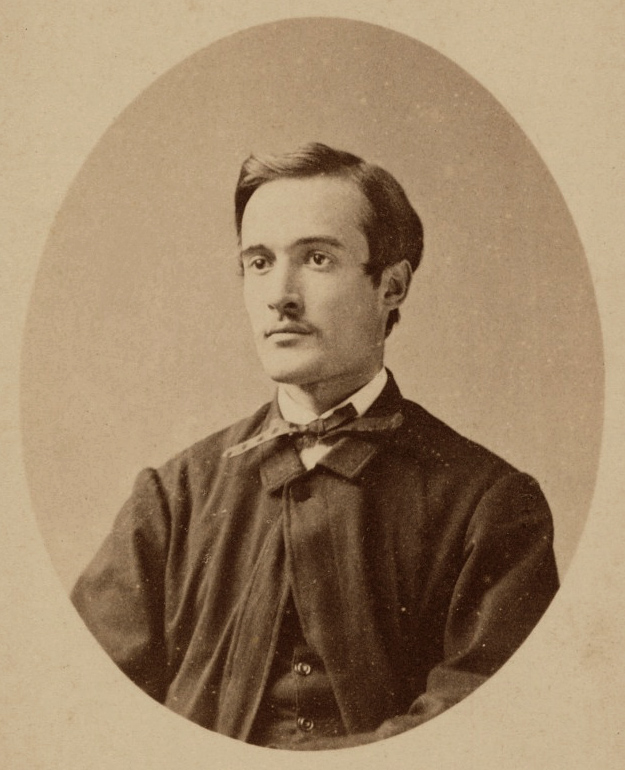
- Preston Powers, 1870
- Born: 1843; Florence, Grand Duchy of Tuscany
- Died: 1931 (aged 87–88); Florence, Italy
- Known for: American sculptor, painter, and teacher
- Notable work: statue The Closing of an Era at the Colorado State Capitol in Denver

Preston Powers (1843–1931) was an American sculptor, painter, and teacher, born in Florence, Grand Duchy of Tuscany. He is also known as William Preston Powers.

== Biography ==
Powers studied with his father, Hiram Powers, a well known Neo-classical sculptor and expatriate who lived in Italy. After returning to the United States, the younger Powers worked as an artist in Boston Massachusetts, Washington, D.C., and Portland Maine. Powers eventually became his father's personal secretary, a position he held until Hiram Powers' death in 1873. Preston sued his mother for inadequate support after the details of his father's will became known, as it declared his widow as sole heir. In order to keep peace within the family, Preston Powers was made the supervisor of Hiram Powers' studio-workshop, which eventually closed in 1877. He later operated his own studio across the street from his mother's house but insisted on harassing her with additional lawsuits. Preston Powers died penniless in Florence, Italy, and was buried in the pauper's section of the Allori Protestant Cemetery located outside the city.

== Work ==
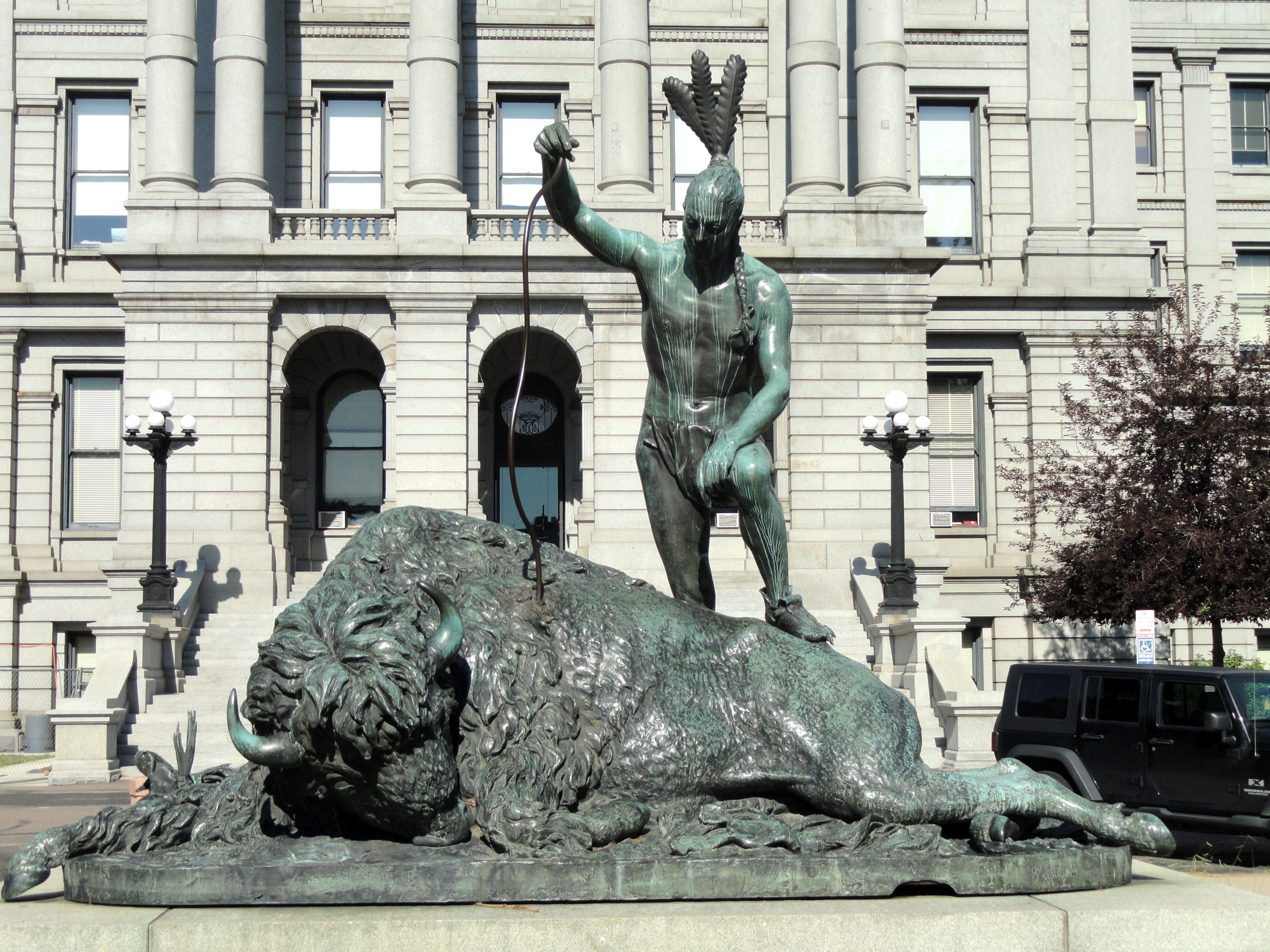
The Closing Era, Colorado State Capitol, Denver

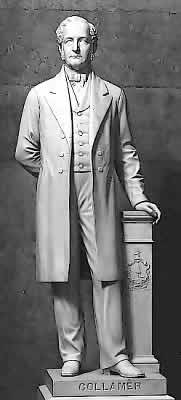
Statue of Jacob Collamer, part of the U.S. National Statuary Hall Collection

Powers' statue The Closing of an Era at the Colorado State Capitol in Denver depicts an American Indian in triumph over a fallen bison. The granite for the statue came from Fremont County, Colorado. The sculpture was completed for the Chicago World's Fair in 1893. Powers' friend John Greenleaf Whittier wrote the poem inscribed at the base of the monument.

Preston Powers sculpted several portrait busts; some of his most notable creations include:

- Lady Alexander Mackenzie of Scotland
- United States Senator Justin Smith Morrill of Vermont
- James Lawrence, Boston, Massachusetts
- Alvin Adams, founder of Adams Express Company
- John Greenleaf Whittier
- J. C. Whiting
- Senator Charles Sumner
- President Ulysses S. Grant
- Marshall Field and Son, Chicago, Illinois
- Mrs. Wheatland, Salem, Massachusetts
- Eugene Sargent, Boston
- Mrs. John E. Hatch, Cincinnati
- Senator Jacob Collamer of Vermont, installed in the United States Capitol, in Washington, D.C., as part of the National Statuary Hall Collection.
- Bishop George Burgess, first Episcopal bishop of Maine
- Emanuel Swedenborg, for the New Church in England
- Reuben Springer, for the Music Hall in Cincinnati

His students include Alice Cooper and Elsie Ward.
