= Hiram Powers =

American sculptor (1805–1873)

- Powers and his autograph, c. 1863
- Born: July 29, 1805; Woodstock, Vermont, US
- Died: June 27, 1873 (aged 67); Florence, Kingdom of Italy
- Resting place: English Cemetery
- Known for: The Greek Slave
- Children: Preston Powers

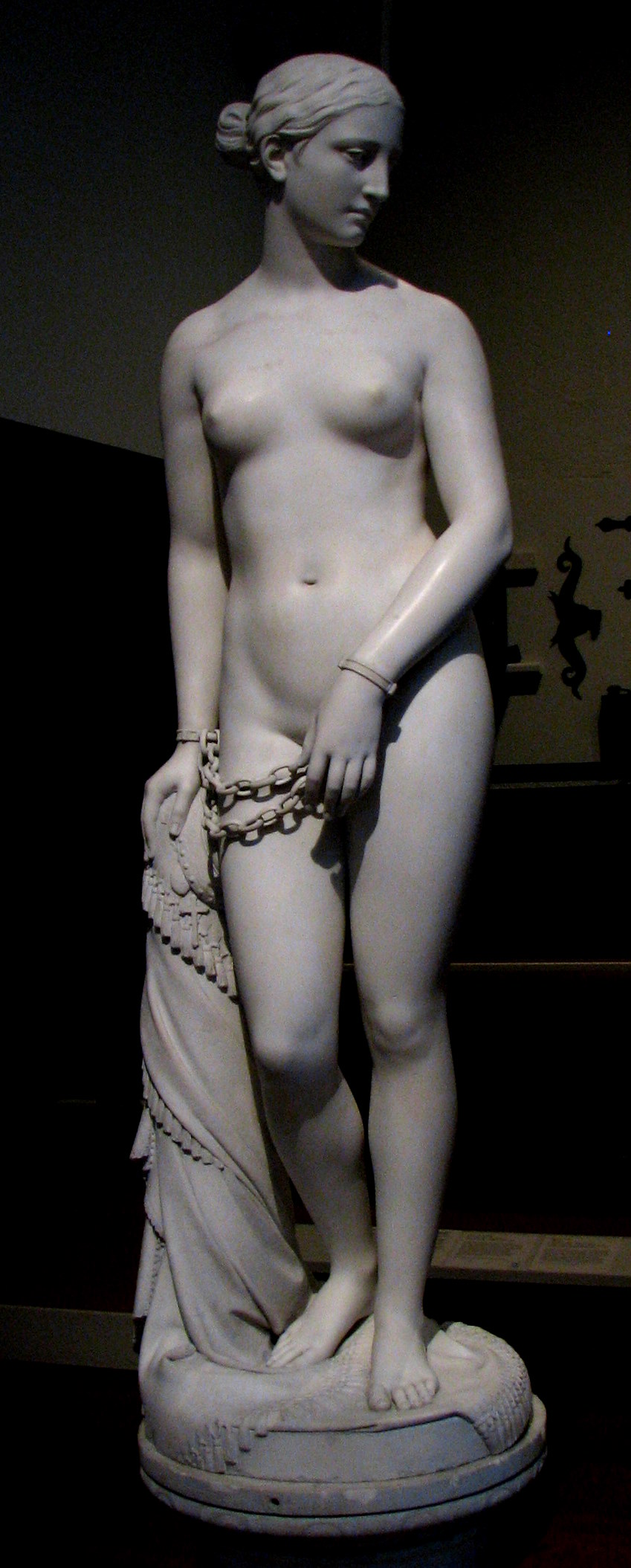
The Greek Slave

Hiram Powers (July 29, 1805 – June 27, 1873) was an American neoclassical sculptor. He was one of the first 19th-century American artists to gain an international reputation, largely based on his famous marble sculpture The Greek Slave.

== Early life and studies ==
Powers was born to a farmer on July 29, 1805 in Woodstock, Vermont. When he was 14 years old, his family moved to Ohio, about six miles from Cincinnati, where Powers attended school for about a year while staying with his father's brother, a lawyer. He began working after the death of his parents, first superintending a reading-room in connection with the chief hotel of the town, then working as a clerk in a general store. At age 17, Powers became an assistant to Luman Watson, Cincinnati's early wooden clockmaker, who owned a clock and organ factory. Using his skill in modeling figures, Powers mastered the construction of the instruments and became the first mechanic in the factory.

In 1826, he began to frequent the studio of Frederick Eckstein Sr., and at once conceived a strong passion for the art of sculpture. His proficiency in modeling secured him the situation of general assistant and artist of the Western Museum, kept by a Louisiana naturalist of French extraction named Joseph Dorfeuille. Here he created representations of scenes in the poem Inferno by Dante, which met with extraordinary success. Fanny Trollope helped launch his career when she had him sculpt Dante's Commedia. After studying thoroughly the art of modeling and casting, he moved to Washington, D.C. at the end of 1834.

== Career as a sculptor ==
Powers drew attention and local commissions in Washington, D.C. with his modeled portrait of Andrew Jackson. In 1837 he moved to Italy and settled on the Via Fornace in Florence, where he had access to good supplies of marble and to traditions of stone-cutting and bronze casting. He remained in Florence till his death, though he did travel to Britain during this time. During his time in Italy, he developed a friendship with Horatio Greenough. He developed a thriving business in portraiture and "fancy" parlor busts, but he also devoted his time to creating life-size, full-figure ideal subjects, many of which were also isolated as a bust. In 1839 his statue of Eve won the admiration of the leading European neoclassical sculptor, Bertel Thorvaldsen.

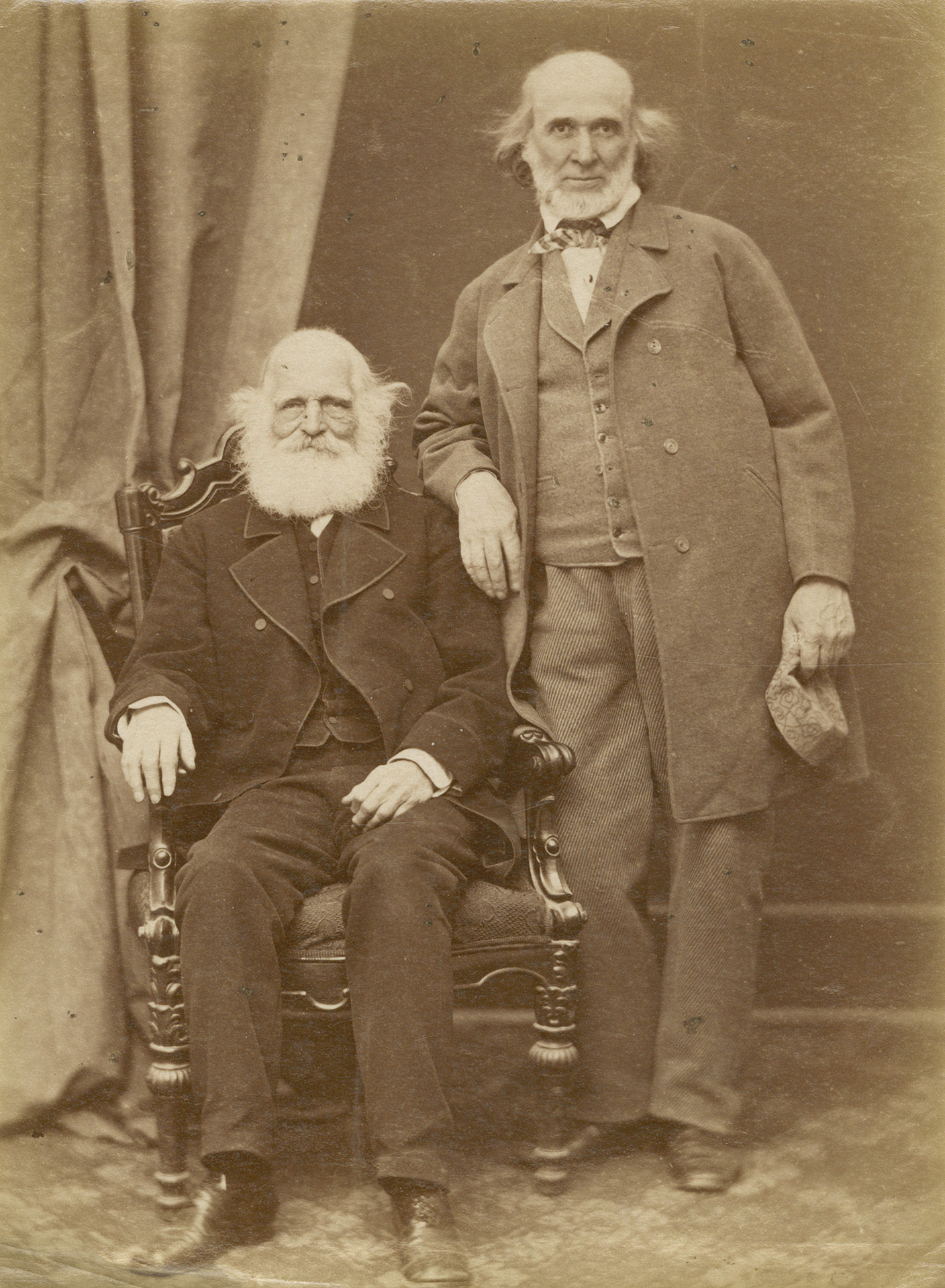
William Cullen Bryant and Hiram Powers, 1867

In 1843 Powers produced his most celebrated statue, The Greek Slave, which at once gave him a place among the leading sculptors of his time. It attracted more than 100,000 viewers when it toured America in 1847; and in 1851 was exhibited in Britain (along with the Fisher Boy, his other very famous statue, mentioned below) at the center of the Crystal Palace Exhibition, when Elizabeth Barrett Browning wrote a sonnet on it. This sculpture was used in the abolitionist cause and copies of it appeared in many Union-supporting state houses. Among the best known of his other idealising statues are The Fisher Boy, Il Penseroso, Eve Disconsolate, California, America and The Last of the Tribe (also called The Last of Her Tribe). He was elected an Associate Fellow of the American Academy of Arts and Sciences in 1851.

Powers' most discerning and important private client was Prince Anatole Demidoff, who owned marble full-figure versions of both the Greek Slave and the Fisher Boy and also commissioned from Powers a portrait bust of his wife, the niece of Napoleon and the Grand Duchess of Tuscany. The statues and busts Powers carved for Demidoff were exceptional in the quality and purity of the marble employed.

Powers became a teacher at the Florence Accademia. One of his sons was the sculptor Preston Powers.

Hiram Powers died in Florence on June 27, 1873 and is buried, as were three of his children, at the cities' English Cemetery.

Spiritual descendants of Hiram Powers in Europe included the notorious Futurist designer 'Thayaht,' pseudonym of Ernesto Michahelles and his brother, the notorious neo-metaphysical artist RAM, pseudonym of Ruggero Alfredo Michahelles who was awarded the "Prix Paul Guillaume" in Paris in 1937.

== Collections ==
In 2007 the Taft Museum of Art, Cincinnati, Ohio presented the first major exhibition devoted to his work, "Hiram Powers: Genius in Marble". This is the same place of the first solo exhibition of Powers' work in Cincinnati in 1842, when Nicholas Longworth opened his private residence to allow the public to view Power's newest sculpture.

Collections holding works by Hiram Powers include the Addison Gallery of American Art (Andover, Massachusetts), the Amon Carter Museum (Texas), the Arizona State University Art Museum, the Art Gallery of the University of Rochester (New York), the Art Institute of Chicago (Illinois), the Berkshire Museum (Massachusetts), the Birmingham Museum of Art (Alabama), the Brooklyn Museum of Art (New York City), the Carnegie Museum of Art (Pittsburgh, Pennsylvania), the Chrysler Museum of Art (Norfolk, Virginia), the Cincinnati Art Museum, the Corcoran Gallery of Art (Washington D.C.), Cornell Fine Arts Museum at Rollins College (Florida), High Museum of Art (Atlanta, GA) Dallas Museum of Art (Texas), Detroit Institute of Arts, Fine Arts Museums of San Francisco, the Glencairn Museum (Pennsylvania), the Greenville County Museum of Art (South Carolina), Harvard University Art Museums, the Honolulu Museum of Art, the Hudson River Museum (Yonkers, New York), the McMullen Museum of Art (Massachusetts), the Metropolitan Museum of Art, the Milwaukee Art Museum, Miami University, the Minneapolis Institute of Arts (MIA), the Morse Museum of American Art, (Florida), the Museum of Fine Arts, Boston, the Museum of Fine Arts, Houston the National Gallery of Art (Washington D.C.), the Newark Museum (New Jersey), the North Carolina Museum of Art, the Portland Museum of Art (Maine), Raby Castle (County Durham, England), the Smithsonian American Art Museum (Washington D.C.), the United States Senate Art Collection, the University of Cincinnati Galleries (Ohio), the University of Michigan Museum of Art, the Vermont State House Fine Arts Collection (Montpelier, Vermont), the White House Collection, (Washington), the Yale University Art Gallery (New Haven, Connecticut), Huddersfield Art Gallery (UK), Edward Lee McClain High School (Greenfield, Ohio) and the Gilcrease Museum (Tulsa, OK).

== Gallery ==
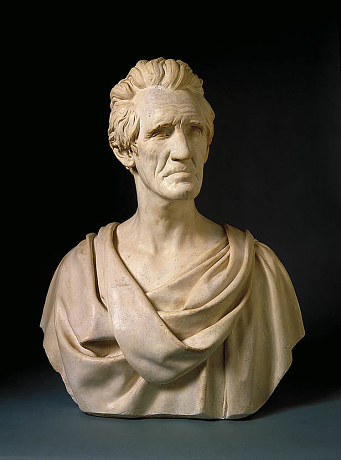
President Andrew Jackson, modeled in 1835

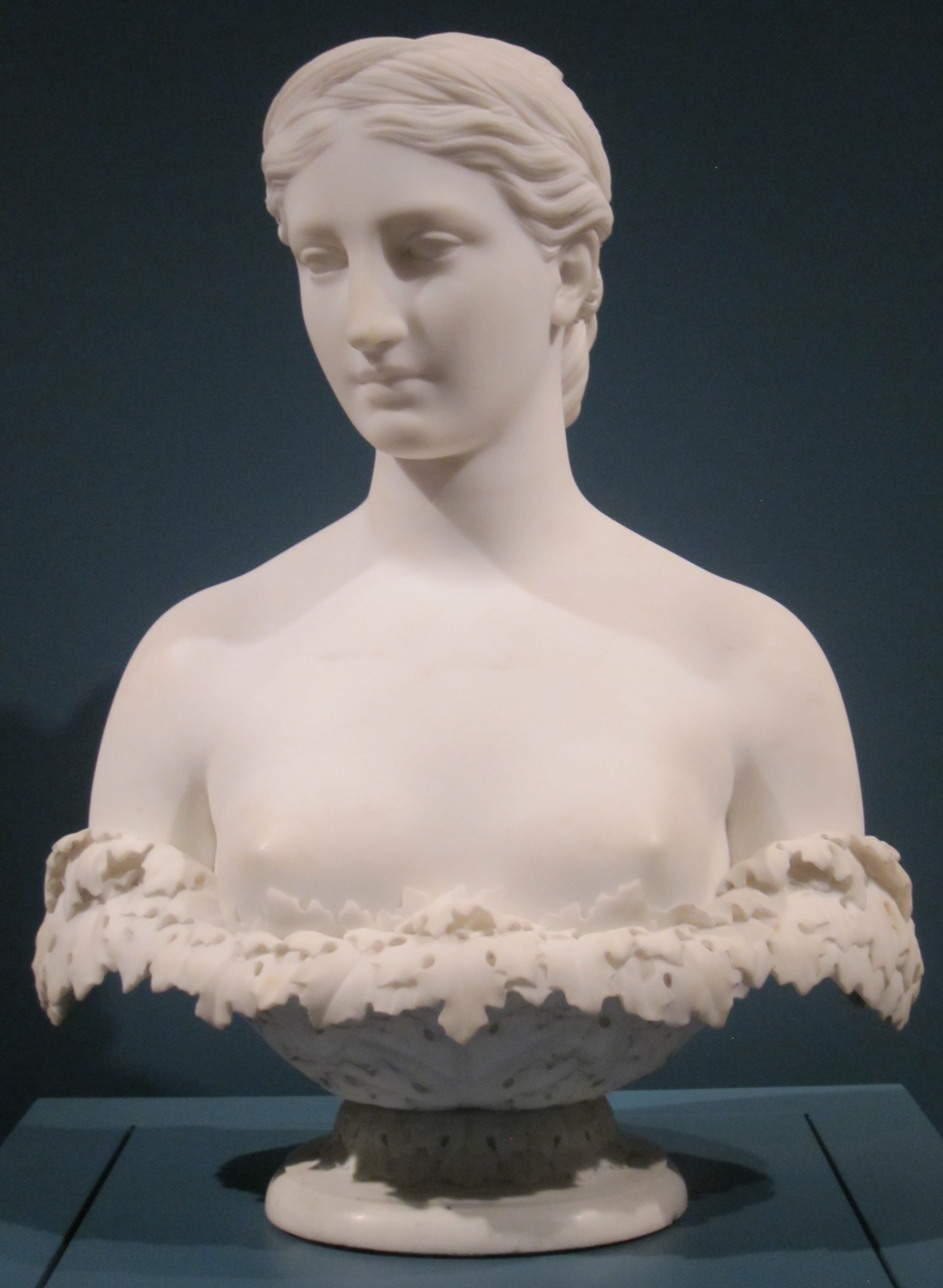
Proserpine, 1844

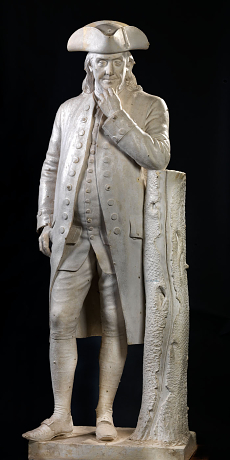
Benjamin Franklin, 1844–60

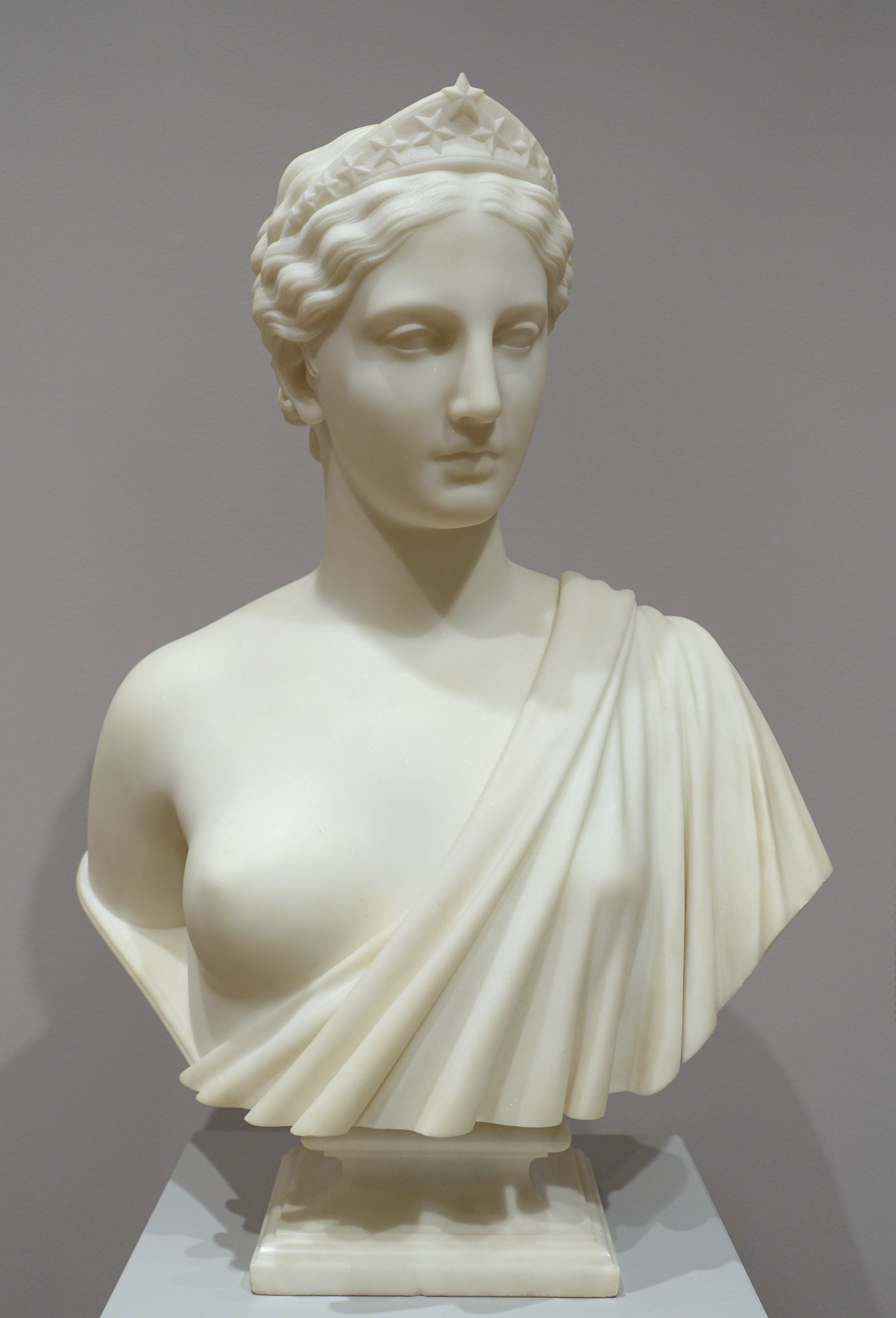
America, 1854

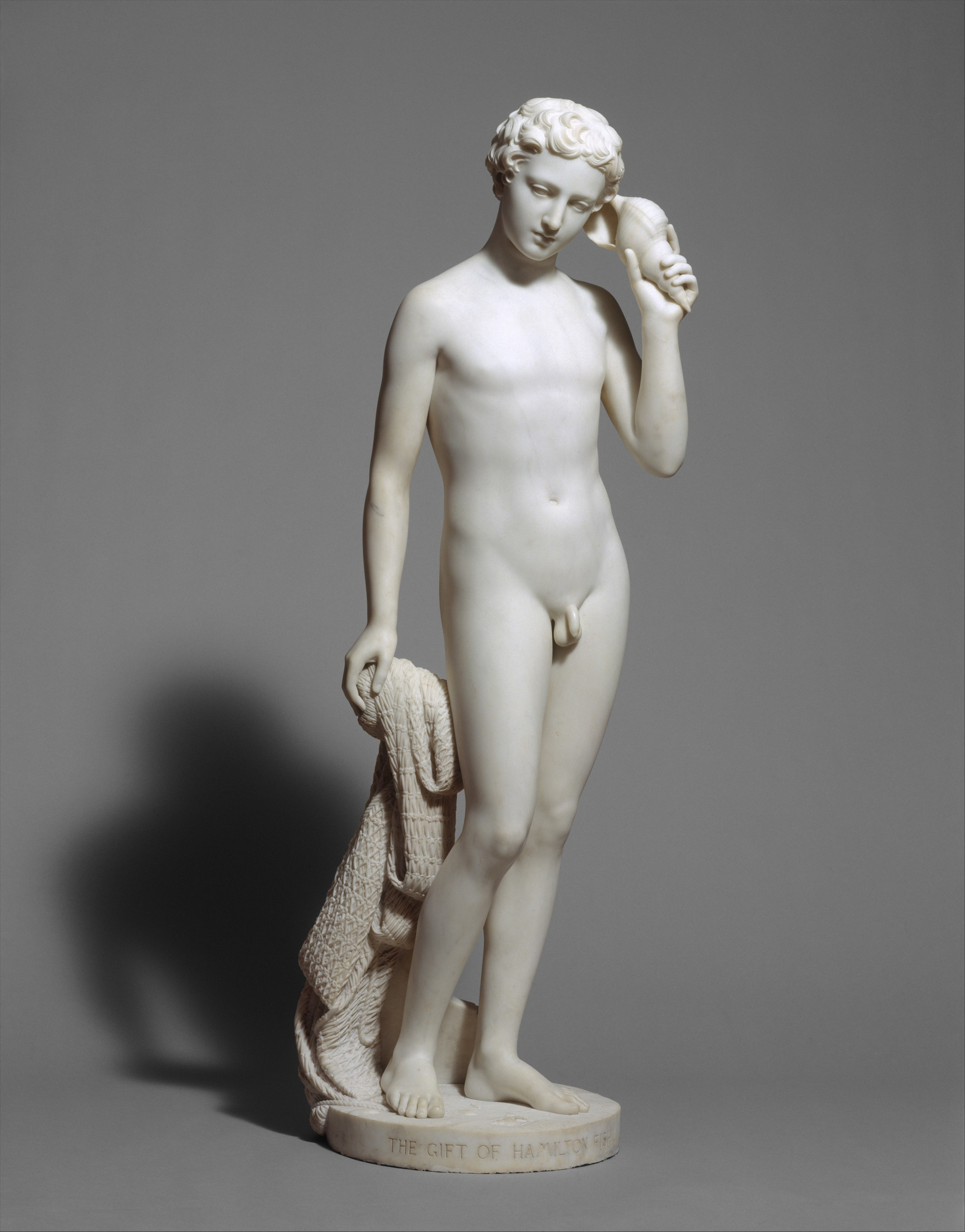
Fisher Boy, 1857

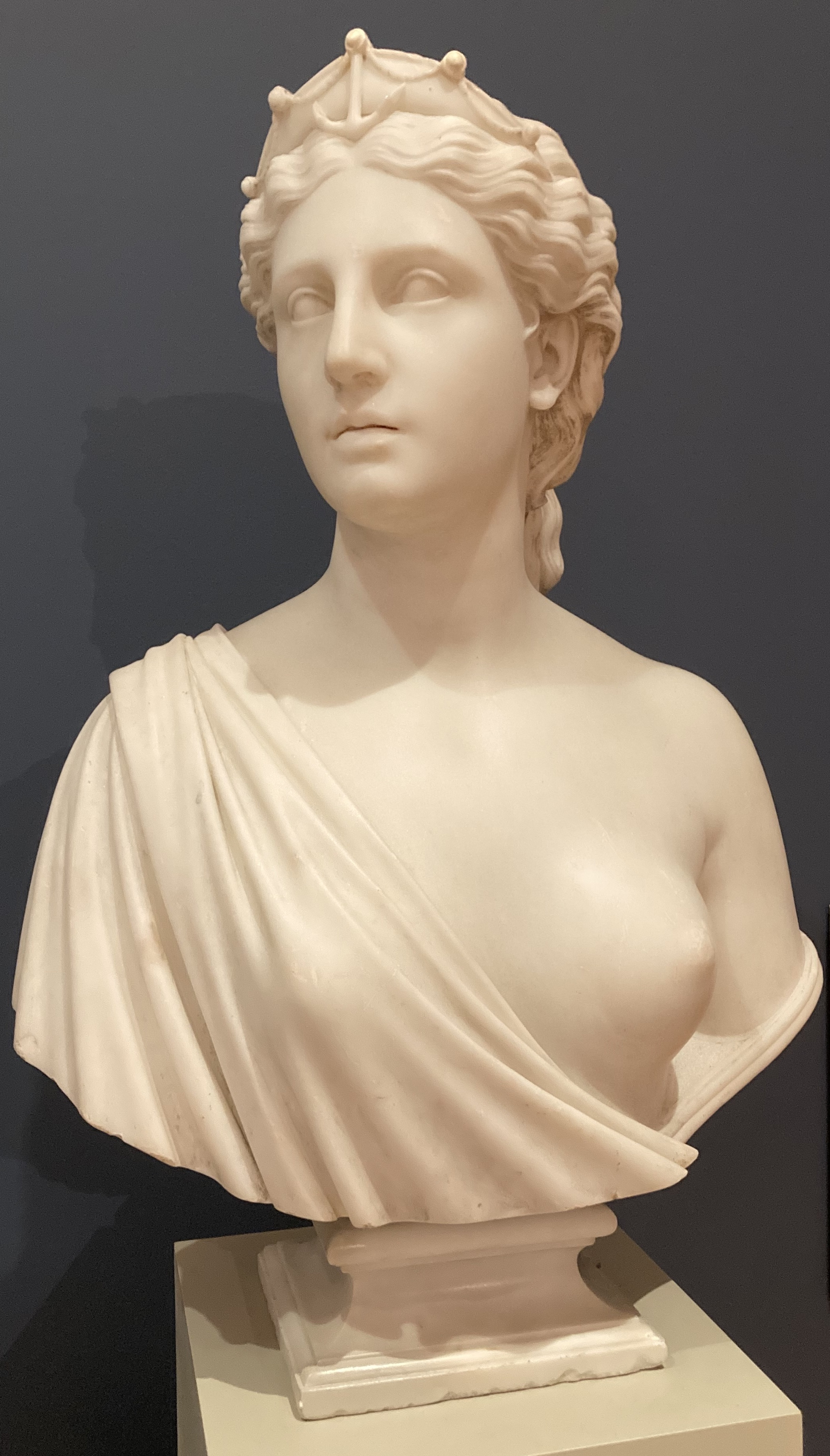
Hope, ca. 1866

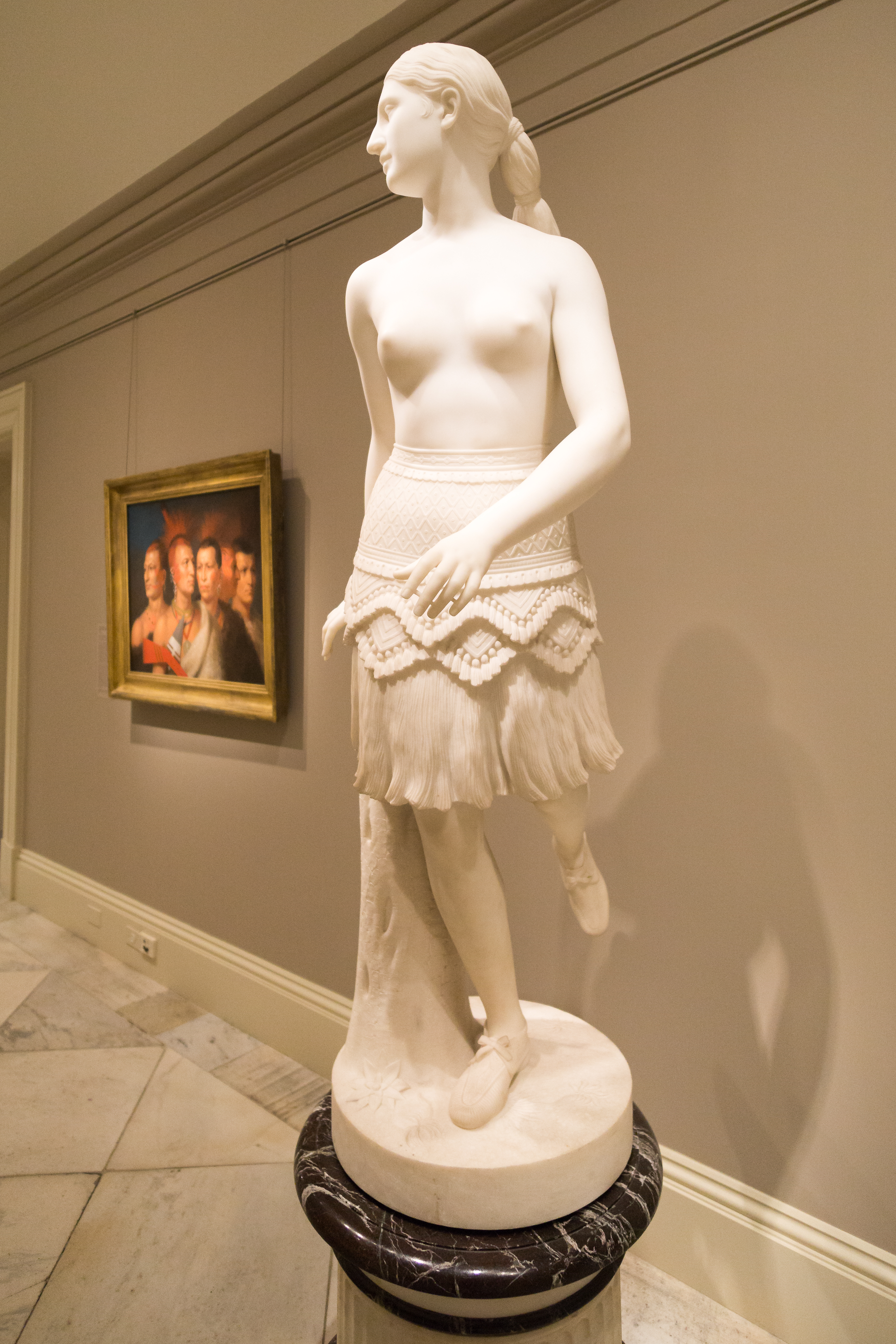
The Last of the Tribes, 1876–77
