= Fairbanks family =

Canadian-American family

Fairbanks Fairbank
- Political, mercantile
- Coat of Arms of Jonathan Fairbanks
- Country: United Kingdom; United States; Canada
- Current region: United States; Canada
- Origin: Heptonstall, Halifax, West Yorkshire, England
- Founded: 1633
- Founder: Jonathan Fairbanks
- Seat: Fairbanks House

The Fairbanks family (also written as Fairbank) is a noted American and Canadian family of English origin. The family descends from colonist Jonathan Fairbanks, who emigrated to Boston, Massachusetts in 1633 with his family, settling at Dedham, Massachusetts three years later. There he built the Fairbanks House, today the oldest surviving verified timber-frame house in the United States.

The Fairbanks family later became one of the Second Families of the United States with the election of Charles W. Fairbanks as the twenty-sixth vice president of the United States in 1905. The Fairbanks North Star Borough, Alaska; Fairbanks, Alaska; Fairbanks, Minnesota; Fairbanks, Oregon; and Fairbanks Township, Michigan all take their names from him.

The Fairbank Center for Chinese Studies at Harvard University is named after a member of the family, John King Fairbank. The American manufacturing company Fairbanks-Morse was founded by another member of the family, Thaddeus Fairbanks.

The following genealogical tree illustrates the links between the more notable family members:

== Family tree ==
- Jonathan Fairbanks (c. 1595–1668) m. Grace Smith (c. 1600–1673)
  - John Fairbanks I (1618–1684) m. Sarah Fiske (c. 1620–1683)
    - Joseph Fairbanks I (1656–1734) m. Dorcas ? (c. 1660–1738)
      - Joseph Fairbanks II (1687–1753) m. Abigail Deane (1694–1750)
        - Samuel Fairbanks (1728–1812) m. Mary Draper
          - Samuel Fairbanks (1753–1825) m. (1). Rachel Lovett (1755–1806); 1807 (2). Joanna Gilmer (d. 1812); 1812 (3). Martha Legg (d. 1838)
            - Jasan Fairbanks (1785–1875) m. Mary Massey (1796–1882)
              - George Rainsford Fairbanks (1820–1906)
  - George Fairbanks (1619–1682)
    - Eleazer Fairbanks (1655–1741) m. Martha Lovett
      - Eleazer Fairbanks (1690–1741) m. Martha Bullard
        - Eleazer Fairbanks (1716–1782) m. Prudence Cary
          - Abel Fairbanks (1754–1842) m. Hannah Hobbs (d. 1840)
            - Harvey Fairbanks (1787–1877) m. Lois Hall (1792–1872)
              - Charles Hall Fairbanks (1835–1916) m. Amelia A. Williams (1836–1926)
                - Herbert Charles Fairbanks (1859–1932) m. Ellen E. Hammond (1857–1920)
                  - Frank Latta Fairbanks (1884–1939) m. Helen McClellan Hart
                    - David Fairbanks (1922–1975)
        - Ebenezer Fairbanks (1734–1812) m. Elizabeth Dearth (1743–1818)
          - Joseph Fairbanks (1763–1846) m. Phebe Paddock (1760–1853)
            - Erastus Fairbanks (1792–1864) m. Lois Crossman (1792–1866)
              - Horace Fairbanks (1820–1888) m. Mary E. Taylor (1824–1901)
              - Franklin Fairbanks (1828–1895)
            - Thaddeus Fairbanks (1796–1886) m. Lucy Peck Barker (1798-1866)
              - Henry Fairbanks (1830–1918) m. 1862 (1). Annie S. Noyes (1845–1872); 1874 (2). Ruthy Page
                - Charlotte Fairbanks (1871–1932)
          - Rufus Fairbanks (1759–1842) m. Ann Prescott (1766–1850)
            - Charles Rufus Fairbanks (1790–1841)
            - Samuel Prescott Fairbanks (1795–1882)
    - Jonathan Fairbanks (1662–1719) m. (1). Sarah ? (1666–1713)
      - Samuel Fairbanks (1693–1756) m. Susannah Watson
        - Samuel Fairbanks (1720–1790) m. (1). Hannah Corbin; (2). Lucy Smith (d. 1802)
          - Jonas Fairbanks (1747–1825) m. (1). Mary Carter; 1782. (2). Freelove Stanley (1760–1831)
            - Ebenezer Fairbanks (1776–1848) m. Abigail Cobb
              - Henry Fairbanks (1825–1909) m. Esther Palmer (1832–1910)
                - Charles Fairbanks (1857–1935) m. Sarah Palmer (1860–1954)
                  - Louis Byron Fairbanks (1885–1961) m. Henrietta Herron
                    - Charles H. Fairbanks (1913–1984)
  - Jonas Fairbanks (1625–1676) m. Lydia Prescott
    - Jabez Fairbank (c. 1670–1758) m. (1). Mary Wilder (c. 1675–1718)
      - Joseph Fairbank (1693–1772) m. Mary Brown (c. 1700–1791)
        - Joseph Fairbank Jr (1722–1802) m. (1). Mary Willard (1722–1748); 1749 (2). Abigail Tarbell (1721–1798); 1801 (3). Mary Willard
          - Joseph Fairbank III (1743–1784) m. Asenath Osgood
            - Joseph Fairbank IV (1778–1847) m. Polly Brooks (1780–1860)
              - David Fairbanks (1810–1895) m. Susan Mandeville (1819–1899)
                - Ralph Jacobus Fairbanks (1857–1943) m. Celestia Adelaide Johnson
                  - Zella Modine (1900–1995)
                    - Nola Fairbanks (1924–2021)
                    - Mark Alexander Modine
                      - Matthew Modine (b. 1959)
                        - Ruby Modine (b. 1990)
              - John Boylston Fairbanks (1817–1875) m. Sarah Van Wagoner
                - John Fairbanks (1855–1940) m. (1). Lilly Huish (1857–1898); 1917 (2). Florence Gifford
                  - J. Leo Fairbanks (1878–1946)
                  - Ortho Lane Fairbanks (b. 1887)
                    - Ortho R. Fairbanks (1925–2015)
                  - Avard Fairbanks (1897–1987)
                    - Jonathan Leo Fairbanks (b. 1933)
      - Jonas Fairbank (1703–1792) m. Thankful Wheeler (1711–1795)
        - Josiah Fairbank (1734–1798) m. Abigail Carter (d. 1815)
          - Manesseh Fairbank (1765–1848) m. Octavia Taylor (1771–1866)
            - Stephen Taylor Fairbank (1794–1850) m. Mehitable Kellogg
              - Nathaniel Kellogg Fairbank (1829–1903) m. Helen Livingston Graham (1840–1895)
                - Kellogg Fairbank (1869–1939) m. Janet Ayer Fairbank (1878–1951)
                  - Janet Fairbank (1903–1947)
          - Ephraim Fairbank (1770–1837) m. Sarah Chandler (1776–1844)
            - John Barnard Fairbank (1796–1873) m. Hannah M. Crissy
              - Rev. Samuel B. Fairbank (1822–1898) m. 1846 Abby Allen (d. 1852); 1856 (2). Mary Ballantine (1836–1878)
                - Rev. Henry Fairbank (1862–1926) m. Ruby Elizabeth Harding (1860–1906)
                  - Samuel Ballantine Fairbank (1887–1959) m. Helen Leslie Martin
                    - William M. Fairbank (1917–1989) m. Jane Davenport
                      - Richard Fairbank (b. 1950)
              - Rev. John Barnard Fairbank (1831–1910) m. 1859 (1). Emily P. Mack (d. 1860); 1863 (2). Ruth A. Boyce (d. 1889)
                - Arthur Boyce Fairbank (1873–1936) m. Lorena King (1874–1979)
                  - John K. Fairbank (1907–1991)
      - Thomas Fairbank (1707–1791) m. Dorothy Carter (1710–1784)
        - John Fairbank (1731–1817) m. (1). Relief Houghton; 1796 (2). Tabitha White
          - John Fairbank (1755–1830) m. Fanny Kelton (d. 1847)
            - Asa Fairbank (1784–1842) m. 1827 (1). Polly Leonard (d. 1827); 1829 (2). Mary Oliver (d. 1870)
              - John Henry Fairbank (1831–1914) m. Edna Chrysler (1829–1896)
                - Charles Oliver Fairbank (1858–1925) m. Clara Mabel Sussex
                  - Charles Oliver Fairbank (1904–1982)
      - Joshua Fairbank (1714–1769) m. Eunice Wilder
        - Calvin Fairbank (1753–1836) m. (1). Jenny Ayers (1755–1803)
          - Chester Fairbank (1788–1849) m. Betsey Abbott (1787–1882)
            - Calvin Fairbank (1816–1898)
        - Luther Fairbank (1755–1836) m. 1777 (1). Thankful Wheelock (1757–1820); (2). Anna ? (d. 1842)
          - Luther Fairbank (1780–1857) m. (1). Lucy Lewis (1785–1842); 1849 (2). Miranda McLenathan (d. 1850)
            - Loriston Monroe Fairbanks (1824–1900) m. Mary A. Smith
              - Charles W. Fairbanks (1852–1918) m. Cornelia Cole Fairbanks (1852–1913)
                - Richard Monroe Fairbanks (1884–1944) m. Louise Hibben (1889–1912)
                  - Richard Monroe ("Dick") Fairbanks (1912–2000) m. (1). Mary Caperton (d. 1967); 1968 (2). Virginia Nicholson Brown (d. 2007)
                    - Richard M. Fairbanks III (1941–2013)
