= List of people from St. Johnsbury, Vermont =

The following list includes notable people who were born or have lived in St. Johnsbury, Vermont.

== Artists and authors ==
Name	Image	Birth	Death	Known for	Association	Reference
GG Allin		Aug 29, 1956	Jun 28, 1993	Punk rock musician	Raised in East St. Johnsbury	
Edward Behr		1951		Author; publisher of The Art of Eating Magazine	Lives in St. Johnsbury	
Chris Hedges		Sep 18, 1956		Journalist and author	Born in St. Johnsbury	
Stephen Huneck		Oct 8, 1948	Jan 7, 2010	Artist and wood carver	Had studio in St. Johnsbury	
Khonnor		Jul 24, 1986		Musician	Lives in St. Johnsbury	

== Military ==
Name	Image	Birth	Death	Known for	Association	Reference
Asa P. Blunt		Oct 19, 1826	Oct 4, 1889	Civil War-era brevet general	Lived in St. Johnsbury	

== Politics ==
Name	Image	Birth	Death	Known for	Association	Reference
Jonathan Arnold		Dec 3, 1741	Feb 1, 1793	Delegate to the Continental Congress		
Lemuel H. Arnold		Jan 29, 1792	Jun 27, 1852	U.S. congressman and 12th governor of Rhode Island	Born in St. Johnsbury	
George Baldwin		Jan 22, 1830	Dec 7, 1907	Wisconsin politician	Born in St. Johnsbury	
Albert W. Barney		Oct 23, 1920	May 10, 2010	Vermont jurist	Born in St. Johnsbury	
Scott Beck		April 17, 1968		Vermont Senate minority leader	Born in St. Johnsbury	
Helen Burbank		Jul 27, 1898	Feb 22, 1981	Secretary of state of Vermont	Raised, educated and buried in St. Johnsbury	
Alexander Dunnett		Nov 29, 1852	Sep 14, 1920	United States attorney for the District of Vermont, president of the Vermont Bar Association, member of the Vermont Senate from Caledonia County, state's attorney of Caledonia County, Vermont	Lived and worked in St. Johnsbury	
Erastus Fairbanks		Oct 28, 1792	Nov 20, 1864	21st and 26th governor of Vermont	Lived in St. Johnsbury	
Horace Fairbanks		Mar 21, 1820	Mar 17, 1888	36th governor of Vermont	Lived in St. Johnsbury	
Frederick G. Fleetwood		Sep 27, 1868	Jan 28, 1938	US congressman	Born in St. Johnsbury	
Charles E. Gibson Jr.		Dec 20, 1925	Oct 10, 2017	Vermont attorney general	Born and raised in St. Johnsbury	
Ellery Albee Hibbard		Jul 31, 1826	Jul 24, 1903	US congressman		
Harland Bradley Howe		Feb 19, 1873	Apr 22, 1946	Judge		
Henry Clay Ide		Sep 18, 1844	Jun 13, 1921	Governor-general of the Philippines	Practiced law in St. Johnsbury	
Luther Jewett		Dec 24, 1772	Mar 8, 1860	US congressman	Lived and died in St. Johnsbury	
Graham S. Newell		Nov 27, 1915	Jun 20, 2008	State senator	Born and died in St. Johnsbury	
Ephraim Paddock		Jan 4, 1780	Jul 27, 1859	Justice of the Vermont Supreme Court; uncle of Erastus Fairbanks and Thaddeus Fairbanks	Lived in St. Johnsbury	
Jonathan Ross		Apr 30, 1826	Feb 23, 1905	US senator	Lived and died in St. Johnsbury	
Wendell Phillips Stafford		May 1, 1861	Apr 21, 1953	Judge of the United States District Court for the District of Columbia	Lived and worked in St. Johnsbury	
Frank D. Thompson		Apr 9, 1876	Jun 12, 1940	Associate justice of the Vermont Supreme Court	Lived and worked in St. Johnsbury	

== Professionals ==
Name	Image	Birth	Death	Known for	Association	Reference
Walter J. Bigelow		Jan 22, 1865	May 2, 1935	Publisher of the St. Johnsbury Caledonian, former mayor of Burlington, Vermont	Resided in St. Johnsbury while publishing the Caledonian	
Franklin Fairbanks		Jun 18, 1828	Apr 24, 1895	Businessman, philanthropist, and co-founder of Winter Park and Rollins College		
Thaddeus Fairbanks		Jan 17, 1796	Apr 12, 1886	Inventor		
Jacob Green Jackson		Mar 16, 1817	Apr 17, 1901	Lumberman	Born in East St. Johnsbury, Vermont	
Albert B. Jewett		Mar 20, 1829	Mar 6, 1887	Railroad executive	Lived in St. Johnsbury	
Milo Parker Jewett		Apr 27, 1808	Jun 9, 1882	Educator	Born in St. Johnsbury	
Charles Hosmer Morse		Sep 23, 1833	May 5, 1921	Businessman and co-founder of Winter Park and Rollins College	Born in St. Johnsbury	
Henry O'Malley		Mar 22, 1876	Apr 24, 1936	United States Commissioner of Fish and Fisheries (1922–1933)	Born and raised in St. Johnsbury	

== Religion ==
Name	Image	Birth	Death	Known for	Association	Reference
Jacob Gates		May 9, 1811	Apr 14, 1892	Early Mormon leader	Born in St. Johnsbury	
Edward A. Lawrence, Sr.		Oct 7, 1808	Sep 4, 1883	Congregational pastor	Born in St. Johnsbury	
Edwin Wallace Parker		Jan 21, 1833	Jun 4, 1901	Methodist Episcopal missionary bishop	Born in St. Johnsbury	
Bob Smith		Aug 8, 1879	Nov 16, 1950	Co-founder of Alcoholics Anonymous	Born in St. Johnsbury	
Erastus Snow		Nov 9, 1818	May 27, 1888	Early Mormon leader	Born in St. Johnsbury	
Zerubbabel Snow		Mar 29, 1809	Sep 27, 1888	Early Mormon pioneer	Born in St. Johnsbury	

== Sports ==
Name	Image	Birth	Death	Known for	Association	Reference
Jean Dubuc		Sep 15, 1888	Aug 28, 1958	Pitcher for the Cincinnati Reds, Detroit Tigers, Boston Red Sox, and New York Giants	Born in St. Johnsbury	
