= Ephraim Paddock =

American judge (1780–1859)

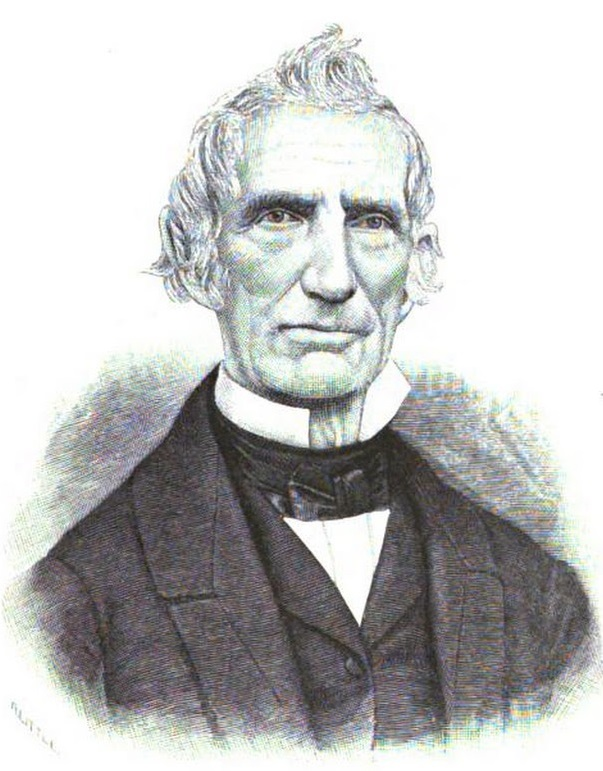
- From 1887's Gazetteer of Caledonia and Essex Counties, Vt. 1764-1887

Associate Justice of the Vermont Supreme Court
- In office 1828–1831
- Preceded by: None (New seat)
- Succeeded by: Nicholas Baylies

Member of the Vermont House of Representatives from St. Johnsbury
- In office 1823–1827
- Preceded by: Abner Miles
- Succeeded by: Ariel Goodrich

Personal details
- Born: January 4, 1780 Holland, Massachusetts
- Died: July 27, 1859 (aged 79) St. Johnsbury, Vermont
- Resting place: Mount Pleasant Cemetery, St. Johnsbury, Vermont
- Party: Whig
- Spouse: Abigail Phelps (m. 1807-1859, his death)
- Children: 2
- Parent(s): James Paddock; Ann (Huxham) Paddock
- Education: Peacham Academy, Peacham, Vermont
- Profession: Attorney

Ephraim Paddock (January 4, 1780 – July 27, 1859) was a Vermont attorney who served as a justice of the Vermont Supreme Court from 1828 to 1831.

== Early life ==
Paddock was born in a portion of Brimfield, Massachusetts that is now the town of Holland on January 4, 1780. The son of James and Ann (Huxham) Paddock, he was educated in Holland, and worked at a store before deciding to settle in Vermont. He completed his education at Peacham Academy, and afterwards remained there to teach. He then studied law with William A. Griswold and Asa King in Danville, and attained admission to the bar in 1809.

== Career ==
In addition to building a successful practice in St. Johnsbury, Paddock served as postmaster from 1815 to 1820 and 1827 to 1829. He was also involved in several other ventures, including farming, sheep raising, and a partnership in a general store.

He also served in the Vermont House of Representatives from 1823 to 1827. In 1828, he was a delegate to the state constitutional convention. From 1828 to 1831, Paddock served as a justice of the Vermont Supreme Court, appointed following the expansion of the court from four judges to five. In 1836, Paddock was one of the vice presidents of Caledonia County's Whig Party convention. In 1841, Paddock was a member of the Council of Censors, the body which met every seven years to review actions of Vermont's government and ensure their constitutionality.

== Death and burial ==
Paddock retired in 1847, and resided in St. Johnsbury until his death on July 27, 1859. He was buried at Mount Pleasant Cemetery in St. Johnsbury.

== Family ==
In 1807, Paddock married Abigail Phelps of Danville. They were the parents of two children, son Horace (1809-1877) and daughter Charlotte (1820-1855). Charlotte Paddock was the wife of Reverend William W. Thayer.

Paddock's sister Phebe (1760-1853) was the wife of Joseph Fairbanks (1763-1846). They were the parents of Thaddeus Fairbanks, Erastus Fairbanks, and Joseph Paddock Fairbanks (1806-1855). The Fairbanks brothers were the developers of the platform scale, and the founders of the E & T Fairbanks Company. In addition, Erastus Fairbanks was a prominent Whig and Republican who twice served as Governor of Vermont.

Phebe Paddock Fairbanks' grandchildren included Horace Fairbanks, who also served as governor, and Franklin Fairbanks, who served as Speaker of the Vermont House of Representatives, and was a developer of Winter Park, Florida. The Fairbanks family was also involved in numerous charitable and civic endeavors throughout St. Johnsbury and the surrounding towns, including the 1842 founding of St. Johnsbury Academy and 1890 founding of the Fairbanks Museum and Planetarium.

== Legacy ==
The Ephraim Paddock House was constructed for Paddock's family in 1820. This federal style brick mansion on St. Johnsbury's Main Street still stands, and continues to be a private residence.

Paddock was a talented musician, proficient on several stringed instruments as well as the piano; his home included a piano manufactured by Jonas Chickering. According to town histories, Paddock's home was a showpiece and tourist destination, with visitors traveling to St. Johnsbury to admire the brickwork, the unique woodwork of the windows and doors, which had been handcrafted by Thaddeus Fairbanks, and Paddock's piano.

== Sources ==
=== Books ===
- Baldwin, Frederick W. (1886). Biography of the Bar of Orleans County, Vermont. Montpelier, VT: Vermont Watchman and State Journal Press. p. 36.
- Childs, Hamilton (1887). Gazetteer of Caledonia and Essex Counties, Vt. 1764-1887. Syracuse, NY: Syracuse Journal Company.
- Dodge, Prentiss Cutler (1912). Encyclopedia of Vermont Biography. Burlington, VT: Ullery Publishing Co. p. 84.
- Fairbanks, Edward T. (1914). The Town of St. Johnsbury, Vt: A Review of 125 Years to the Anniversary Pageant 1912. St. Johnsbury, VT: Cowles Press.

=== Magazines ===
- "Obituary, Ephraim Paddock". The Historical Magazine and Notes and Queries. New York, NY: C. Benjamin Richardson. September 1, 1859.

=== Internet ===
- Zschau, Kurt (October 22, 2015). "The Ephraim Paddock House". Circaoldhouses.com/. Circa Old Houses.com.
- "Our History". stjacademy.org. St. Johnsbury, VT: St. Johnsbury Academy.

Legal offices
Preceded by Newly created seat	Justice of the Vermont Supreme Court; 1828–1830	Succeeded by Nicholas Baylies
Political offices
Preceded by Abner Miles	Member of the Vermont House of Representatives; 1823–1827	Succeeded by Ariel Aldrich
