= Jonathan Fairbanks =

English colonist (1594–1668)

- Born: 1594; Heptonstall, West Yorkshire, England
- Died: December 5, 1668 December 5, 1668 (aged 73–74); Dedham, Massachusetts, U.S.
- Spouse: Grace Smith
- Children: 6

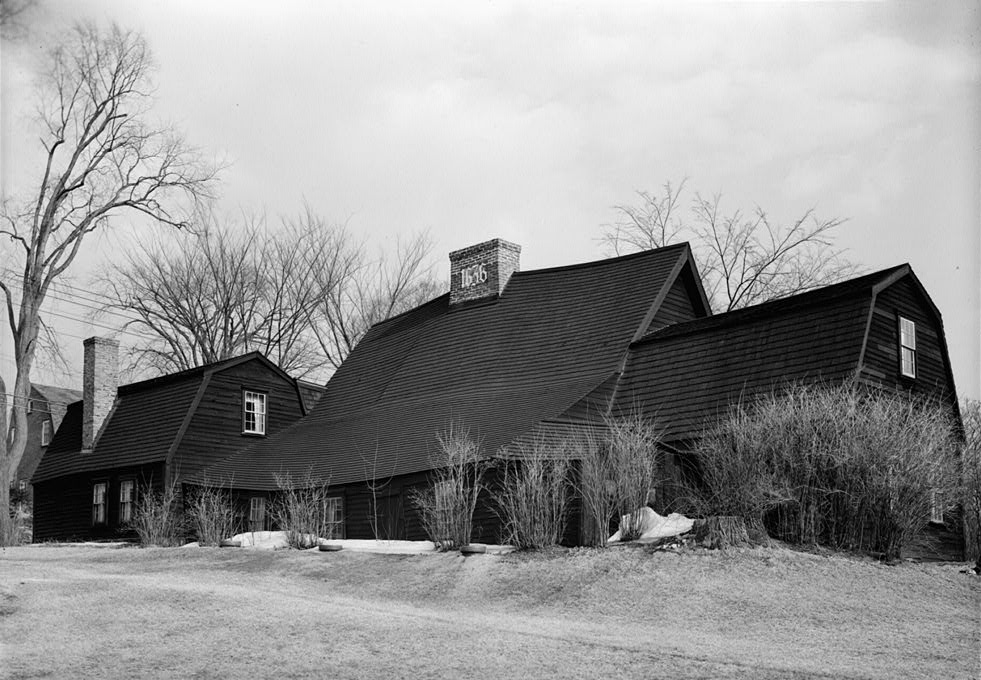
Fairbanks House, ca. 1641, is considered the oldest surviving timber-frame house in North America

Jonathan Fairbanks (1594 – December 5, 1668) was an English colonist born in Heptonstall, Halifax, in the West Riding of Yorkshire, England. He immigrated to New England in 1633. Around 1641, Fairbanks built the Fairbanks House in Dedham, Massachusetts, which is today the oldest surviving wood-framed house in North America.

== Family ==
Coat of Arms of Jonathan Fairbanks

Fairbanks married Grace Smith in Halifax on May 20, 1617. Together, they had six children. To celebrate the Fairbanks' 400th wedding anniversary, the Fairbanks Family in America offered half-price admission to the house, as well as wedding cake and popcorn on May 20, 2017.

== Settlement in New England ==
Jonathan Fairbanks arrived in Boston, Massachusetts Bay Colony, with his family in 1633. The Fairbanks family remained in Boston for about three years before settling in Dedham as one of the earliest settler families. The family purchased 12 acres of land, and in 1641, master carpenters began constructing their home. Jonathan Fairbanks signed the Covenant when the town was founded and named. He served a single term as selectman in 1658.

== Conversion to Christianity ==
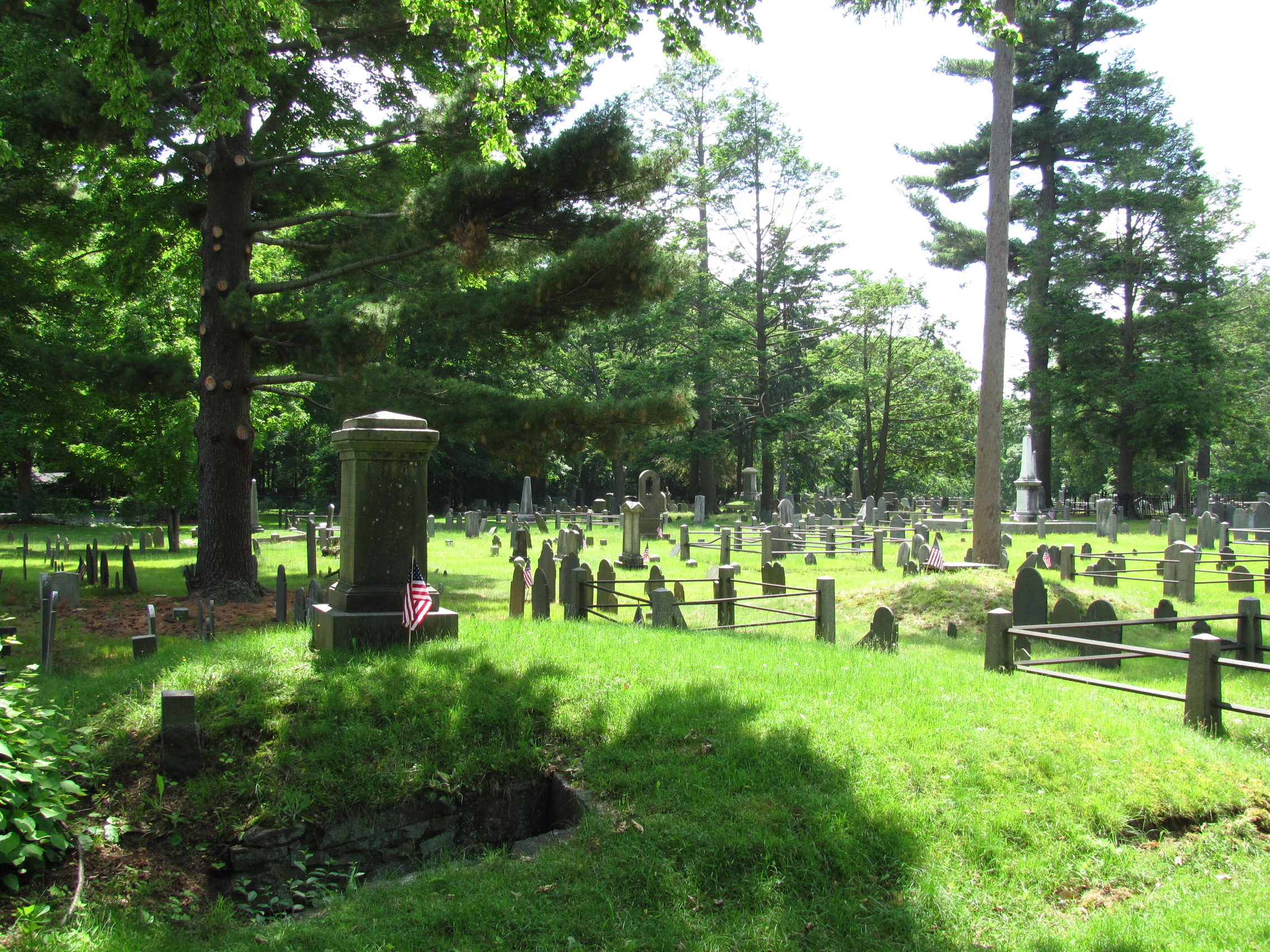
Old Village Cemetery, the final resting place of Fairbanks

Jonathan Fairbanks had "long stood off from the church upon some scruples about public profession of faith and the covenant, yet after divers loving conferences..., [In 1646] he made such a declaration of his faith and conversion to God and profession of subjection to the ordinances of Christ in the church that he was readily and gladly received by the whole church." Fairbanks became a member of the First Church in Dedham, which espoused a Reformed theology (Calvinist) in the seventeenth century.

Jonathan Fairbanks died in Dedham, December 5, 1668. Grace Fairbanks died either October 28, 1673; or March 19, 1676. Fairbanks was buried in the Old Village Cemetery.

As was common at the time Jonathan used several spellings of his surname: Fairbanke, Fairebanke, Fayerbanke, and on his will Fairbanck. His sons and grandsons began spelling the name Fairbank or Fairbanks. The spelling Fairbanks carried on for 15 generations.

== See also ==
- Thaddeus Fairbanks

== Works cited ==
- Worthington, Erastus (1827). The history of Dedham: from the beginning of its settlement, in September 1635, to May 1827. Dutton and Wentworth. p. 29.
