= Nicholas Baylies =

American lawyer, politician and judge (1768–1847)

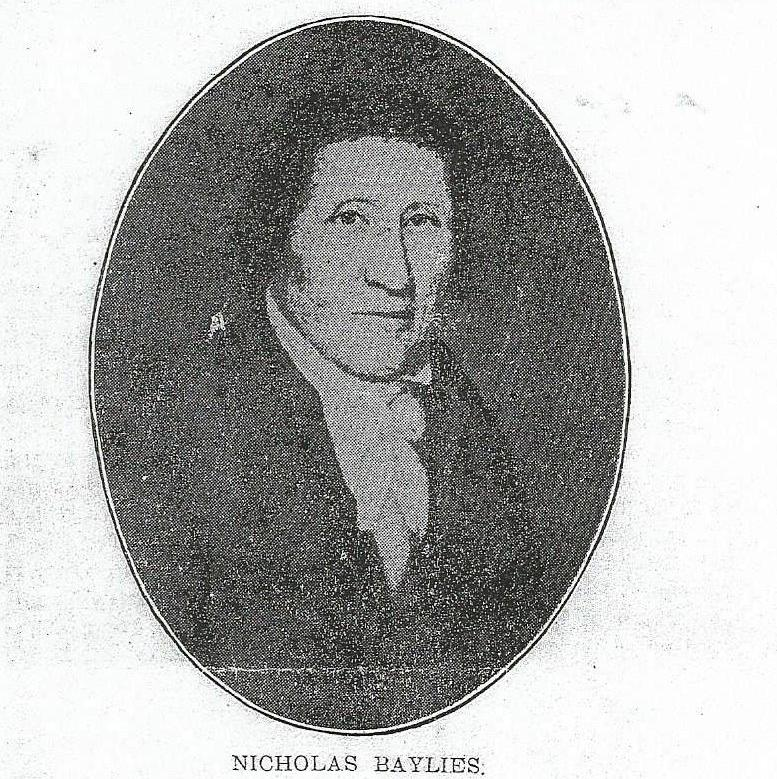

Associate Justice of the Vermont Supreme Court
- In office 1831–1833
- Preceded by: Ephraim Paddock
- Succeeded by: Jacob Collamer

Personal details
- Born: April 9, 1768 Uxbridge, Massachusetts, British America
- Died: April 14, 1847 (aged 79) Lyndon, Vermont, U.S.
- Resting place: Elm Street Cemetery, Montpelier, Vermont, U.S.
- Party: Federalist
- Spouse: Mary Ripley (m. 1798)
- Children: 3
- Relatives: Thomas Baylies (grandfather)
- Education: Dartmouth College
- Profession: Attorney

Nicholas Baylies (April 9, 1768 – April 14, 1847) was a Vermont lawyer, politician, and judge. He served as a justice of the Vermont Supreme Court from 1831 to 1833.

== Biography ==
Nicholas Baylies was born in Uxbridge, Massachusetts on April 9, 1768, the son of Deacon Nicholas Baylies (1739–1831) and Abigail Wood Baylies (1742–1788), and the grandson of Thomas Baylies, a well known New England ironmaster. He was educated in Uxbridge, and graduated from Dartmouth College in 1794.

Baylies moved to Woodstock, Vermont after finishing college, and studied law with Charles Marsh. After attaining admission to the bar, Baylies practiced law in Woodstock as Marsh's partner until 1809, when he relocated to Montpelier. In 1813, Baylies served on the state Council of Censors, which met every seven years to review actions of Vermont's government and ensure their constitutionality. He served as state's attorney of Washington County from 1813 to 1815. From 1814 to 1815 he served on Vermont's executive council. He was state's attorney again from 1825 to 1826. In 1831, Baylies was appointed an associate justice of the Vermont Supreme Court, succeeding Ephraim Paddock. He served until 1833, when he was succeeded by Jacob Collamer.

As an attorney, Baylies was recognized for his legal acumen and technical expertise; among his written works was a three volume reference work on British and U.S. common law, 1814's A Digested Index to the Modern Reports of the Courts of Common Law in England and the United States.

In 1835, Baylies moved to Lyndon, Vermont to live with his daughter Mary and son-in-law, George Cahoon. He continued to practice law almost until his death, and argued a case to the Vermont Supreme Court a few months before he died.

== Death and burial ==
Baylies died in Lyndon on April 17, 1847. He was buried at Elm Street Cemetery in Montpelier.

== Family ==
In 1798, Baylies married Mary Ripley (1778–1830), the daughter of Dartmouth College Professor Sylvanus Ripley, and granddaughter of Dartmouth's founding president, Eleazar Wheelock. Eleazer Wheelock Ripley was her brother.

The children of Nicholas and Mary Baylies included:

- Horatio Nelson Baylies (1802–1849), a merchant who lived first in Montpelier, and later in Franklin, Louisiana
- Mary Ripley Baylies (1804–1858), the wife of George C. Cahoon
- Nicholas (1809–1893), an attorney who settled in Louisiana, where he served in the Louisiana House of Representatives and as a judge. He later moved to Des Moines, Iowa and served in the Iowa House of Representatives.

== Sources ==
=== Books ===
- Fleetwood, Frederick G. (1902). Vermont Legislative Directory. Montpelier, VT: Vermont Watchman Co.
- Hemenway, Abby M. (1882). The History of the Town of Montpelier, Including that of the Town of East Montpelier. Montpelier, VT: A. M. Hemenway.
- Jeffrey, William Hartley (1904). Successful Vermonters: A Modern Gazetteer of Caledonia, Essex, and Orleans Counties. East Burke, VT: Historical Publishing Company.
- Pioneer Law-Makers Association of Iowa (1890). A Brief History of the Organization and Proceedings of the Reunions of 1886 and 1890.
- Thompson, Zadock (1842). History of Vermont, Natural, Civil and Statistical. I. Burlington, VT: Chauncey Goodrich.
- Ullery, Jacob G. (1894). Men of Vermont Illustrated. Brattleboro, VT: Transcript Publishing Company.

=== Magazines ===
- Moore, Charles Whitlock (March 1, 1850). "Death notice, Horatio N. Baylies". Freemason's Monthly Magazine. Vol. 9. Boston, MA: Tuttle and Bennett.

== Works by ==
- Baylies, Nicholas (1814). A Digested Index to the Modern Reports of the Courts of Common Law in England and the United States. Vol. I. Montpelier, VT: Walton & Goss.
- Baylies, Nicholas (1814). A Digested Index to the Modern Reports of the Courts of Common Law in England and the United States. Vol. II. Montpelier, VT: Walton & Goss.
- Baylies, Nicholas (1814). A Digested Index to the Modern Reports of the Courts of Common Law in England and the United States. Vol. III. Montpelier, VT: Walton & Goss.

Political offices
Preceded by Ephraim Paddock	Justice of the Vermont Supreme Court; 1831–1833	Succeeded by Jacob Collamer
