= Graham S. Newell =

American politician

Member of the Vermont Senate from the Caledonia Vermont Senate District district
- In office 1948–1963

Personal details
- Born: November 27, 1915 St. Johnsbury, Vermont
- Died: June 20, 2008 (aged 92) St. Johnsbury, Vermont
- Party: Republican
- Profession: educator

Graham Stiles Newell (November 27, 1915 – June 20, 2008) was a Republican member of the Vermont State Senate, who represented Caledonia County in the Vermont Senate. He had also been elected to the Vermont House, and was an educator.

== Early life ==
Newell was born in St. Johnsbury, Vermont on November 27, 1915. After graduating St. Johnsbury Academy in 1933, he went on to study at Middlebury College where he earned a Bachelor of Arts degree in 1938. He received a Master of Arts degree in Latin in 1949 from the University of Chicago, and did further postgraduate studies in medieval Latin.

== Public life ==
Newell was first elected to the Vermont House of Representatives in 1952 where he served four non-consecutive terms. He was elected to the Vermont Senate for a total of eight consecutive terms In 1980, he retired from public life.

Governor Deane Davis appointed him to the Little Hoover Commission which reorganized the state government into agencies that largely still existed in 2008.

President John F. Kennedy appointed him to the National Advisory Commission on Intergovernmental Relations.

He was a founding member of the Vermont American Civil Liberties Union. He opposed the busing of Vermont parochial school children during his legislative years.

== Career ==
He taught Latin and other humanities classes at St. Johnsbury Academy from 1938 to 1947. He taught at the Hatch Preparatory School, Dexter, Maine from 1947-8. He taught at St. Johnsbury Junior High School 1957-8.

In 1959 he was appointed chairman of the social science department at Lyndon State College, a position he held until he retired as professor emeritus in 1979. He continued to teach there part-time until 1996. In 2011, there was a Graham Newell Chair in History at the college.

He served on the New England Board of Higher Education from 1959 to 1965.

He resumed teaching Latin at St. Johnsbury Academy in 1982 until his death. He was preparing for his next classes until three days before he died.

== Other positions ==
- Elected delegate to Republican National Convention 1956 and 1964
- President, Vermont Historical Society

== Awards ==
- Vermont Chamber of Commerce Citizens of the Year 2005
- Victor R. Swenson Humanities Educator Award 2003, the first awarded, from the Vermont Humanities Council
- Inducted into Vermont Academy or Arts and Sciences, 2005
- Honorary Doctor of Humane Letters, University of Vermont 2006

== Commemorative Measures ==
Newell's life has been commemorated in the following ways:

- Newell's likeness was painted in a Mural on the back wall of The Star Theatre in St. Johnsbury.
- St. Johnsbury Academy honors Newell's commitment to learning with the Graham Newell Education Grant.
- Newell Hall at St. Johnsbury Academy is named in Newell's honor.
