= Fairbanks House (Dedham, Massachusetts) =

Historic house in Massachusetts

- U.S. National Register of Historic Places
- U.S. National Historic Landmark
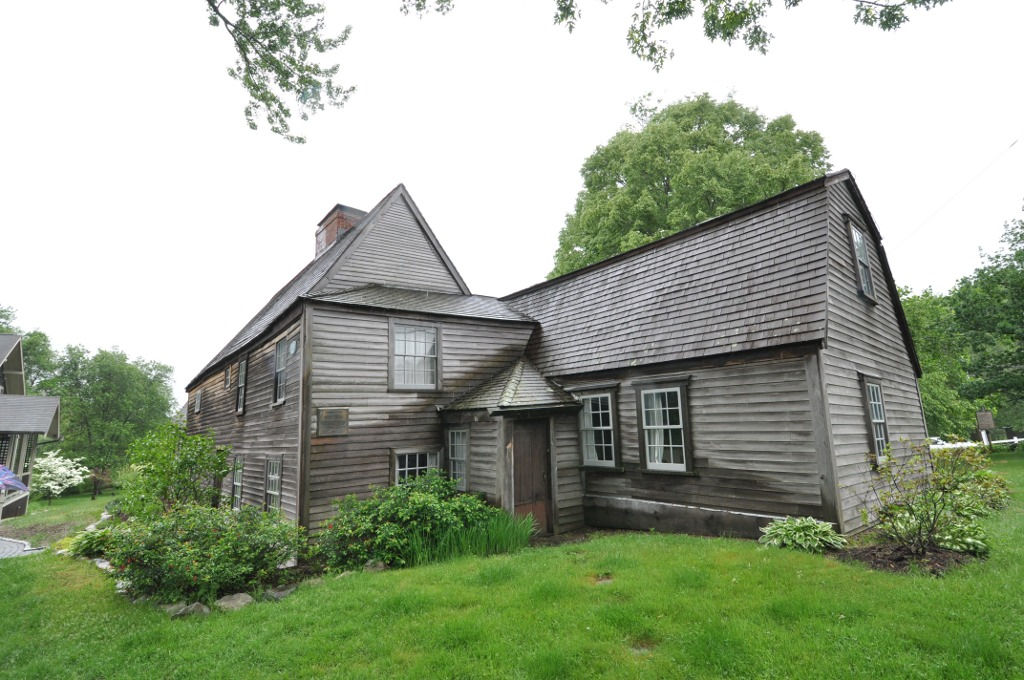
- Fairbanks House in 2013

- Location within Massachusetts Location within the United States
- Interactive map showing the location of Fairbanks House
- Location: 511 East Street, Dedham, Massachusetts
- Coordinates: 42°14′36″N 71°10′04″W
- Built: ca. 1641
- NRHP reference No.: 66000367

Significant dates
- Added to NRHP: October 15, 1966
- Designated NHL: October 9, 1960

The Fairbanks House in Dedham, Massachusetts is a historic house built around 1641, making it the oldest surviving timber-frame house in North America that has been verified by dendrochronology testing. Puritan settler Jonathan Fairbanks constructed the farm house for his wife Grace (née Smith) and their family. It was occupied and passed down through eight generations of the family until the early 20th century. The original portion was expanded over several centuries, as architectural styles changed and the family grew.

Today the Fairbanks house is operated as a historic house museum by the Fairbanks Family in America, a member-based non-profit organization. The Family Association has preserved, studied, and interpreted their ancestral home and its collections for over 110 years. The house was declared a National Historic Landmark in 1961 and is listed on the National Register of Historic Places.

== Architecture ==
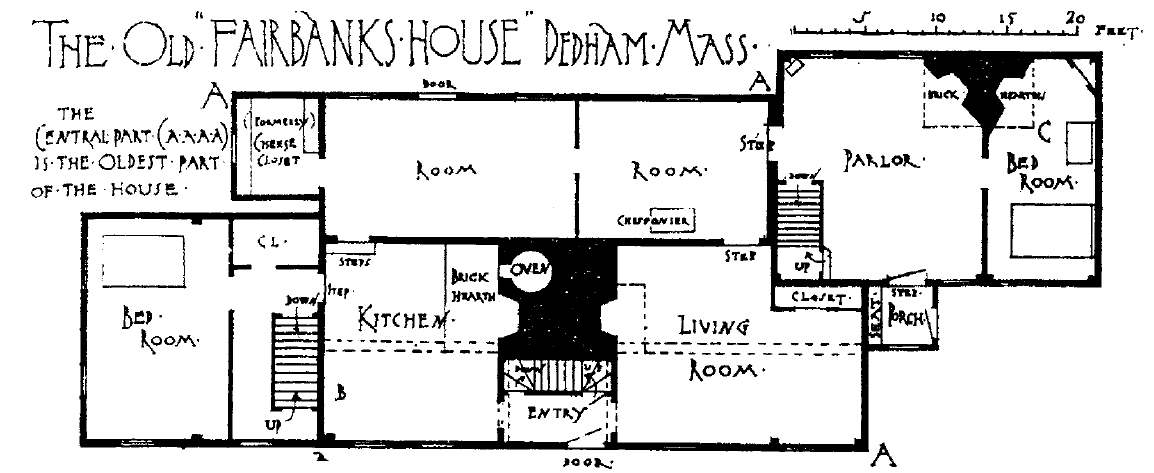
Floor plan, first floor

The house was built in several stages; the center portion of the present house is the oldest, with a gable-roofed portion at the center. It was once a lobby-entry, hall-parlor house of two stories with a center chimney bay. The lean-to was added later, contrary to the note on the first floor plan (see image on left).

The oldest section of the house was completed by at least 1641, based on dendrochronology of several beams in the house. The summer beam has been dated to 1637, and other wall boards and beams were dated to 1638, 1640 and 1641.

Exterior walls were covered with wide oak clapboards at the front, narrower oak on the west gable end, and narrow cedar on the rear. The front door was originally located to the west side of the chimney-bay, while the rear door is still located at the west end of the north wall. Original front windows included wide banks on each floor and small windows lighting the chimney bay. A well-preserved four-light window survives in the east gable end, but the north and east ends of the house apparently had no windows.

A lean-to was later added at the back of the house and, perhaps in 1641, a wing on the east side. The west wing was added around 1654. The east wing was probably added circa late 18th century, assembled from two earlier buildings elsewhere. A chimney was then built for it; later its roof rafters were raised and reused in a new gambrel roof. The next major change was the expansion of the parlor to the east, under a hip roof, and the addition of the small entry to this expanded space, probably around 1800. A new wing was added to the west side of the house, including two rooms. The last addition to the house, completed by 1881, was a privy added behind the west wing.

== History ==
Jonathan Fairbanks came from Heptonstall in the West Riding of Yorkshire, England to Boston, Massachusetts in 1633, and acquired land in 1636–37 and settled in Dedham, Massachusetts, where he built the house on his farm land. It is likely the oldest dwelling house in New England and the oldest house continuously owned by the builder and his lineal descendants. It is also regarded as the oldest surviving timber-frame structure in North America. Since the original purchase, the estate has never had a mortgage encumbrance on it.

There is evidence that some residents practiced folk magic in the house, including placing hex marks and various objects in the house to ward off witches and other evil spirits. Hex signs were carved into the mantel to protect the house from fire and witches. Shoes have been found in the attic and behind the chimney, and are presumed to have been placed there to prevent evil spirits from entering the house.

=== Construction ===
Early historians claimed that the Fairbanks House was built in 1636 although more recent historians now believe the earliest part of the house was built between 1637 and 1641. According to some assertions, the frame of the main part of the house, together with the bricks and tiles and windows, were imported from England, and remained in Boston for several months before being carried to Dedham. The plaster on the walls was made using clay from the Charles River. In 2001, dendrochronological testing by the Oxford Dendrochronology Laboratory confirmed that the timbers from the earliest section of the house were felled between 1637 and 1641.

The house was not built as it stands at one time, or in one year, although it is certain that Jonathan owned a house situated on the same lot by 1648. Subsequently, perhaps as late as 1654, a large addition, called the new house, was made to the original building, and was purportedly built for the occupation of his son John after his marriage. The current roof was put on during this period and has been dated to 1652–1654 using dendrochronology. Later additions to the house occurred in the 18th and 19th centuries.

"It may be said quite simply that no other house of the mid-17th century in New England has survived in such unbelievably unspoiled condition. It is also extraordinary that so early a structure should preserve such a high percentage of original features. It is a veritable storehouse of information concerning the small handful of houses which survive from this early period." —Abbot Lowell Cummings, Professor Emeritus, American Art, Yale University

=== Sale and conversion to a museum ===
In 1879, the great-great-great-granddaughter of Jonathan and Grace Fairbanks, Nancy Fairbanks, died without a husband or children and left the house to her niece, Rebecca Fairbanks. Rebecca moved in, but moved back out again for a short period of time when lightning struck the house and killed her dog. Her worsening financial situation led her to sell the house to local realtor John Crowley in 1895, but she was allowed to continue living there. She also sold a number of family heirlooms, including a wooden chest made in 1658 by John Houghton. The item was purchased by the family again at auction in 2003, and now splits its time between the Fairbanks House and the Dedham Historical Society.

In 1897, Crowley was going to tear down the house to develop the two acre lot, but an appeal in the Boston Transcript led to it being purchased by Mrs. J. Amory Codman and her daughter Martha. The Codmans allowed Rebecca to remain in the house until 1904, when the newly established Fairbanks Family in America took it over and turned it into a museum in 1905. The curators camped in a tent outside the house until 1912, when a new house was purchased from the Sears and Roebuck Catalog and erected next door.

=== 1900s ===
Each year the Fairbanks family hosts a reunion at the house. In 1907, sitting Vice President of the United States Charles W. Fairbanks attended.

The Boston Bicycle Club often stopped at the house during their two-day "Wheel Around the Hub" tours through Boston's suburbs. On the occasion of their 40th anniversary in 1916, they planted a tree on the grounds. In 1926, 15 years after the death of club co-founder and "father of American bicycling" Frank W. Weston, it was discovered that his ashes were still being stored at the undertaker's. The members of the club rallied and, on a Friday afternoon in September, consecrated his remains to the ground under their anniversary tree.

On August 18, 1964, a 17-year-old Dedhamite who lived down the street was driving and missed a left hand turn from Whiting Avenue onto East Street. It was raining, and the pavement was wet. His car ended up in the east wing of the house, with the rear bumper flush with the wall. The 1957 sedan remained in the house overnight until it could be removed the next day.

The accident prompted a stone wall to be erected which prevented another car from hitting the house in 1973. A group of arsonists tried to burn the house down on July 4, 1967. Powderpost beetles were exterminated from the house in the 1970s.

== Images ==
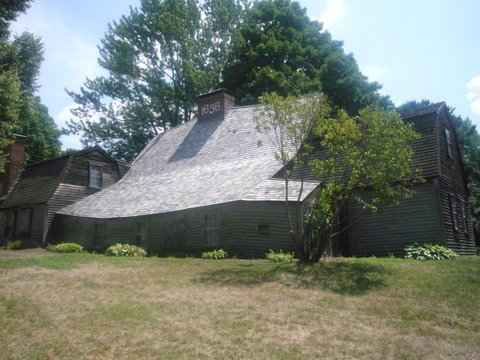
rear view of house, 2010

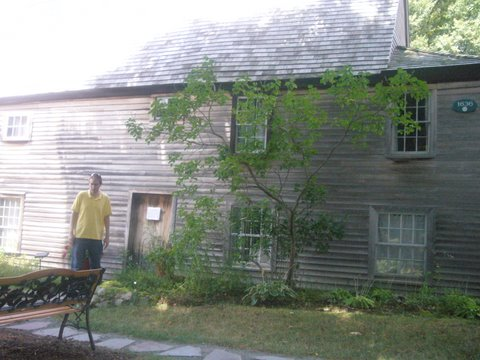
front view of 1640 part of the house

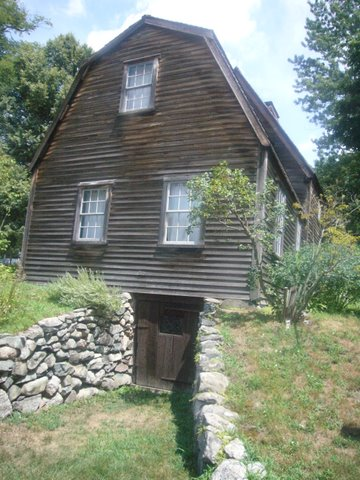
west addition, built ca. 1790

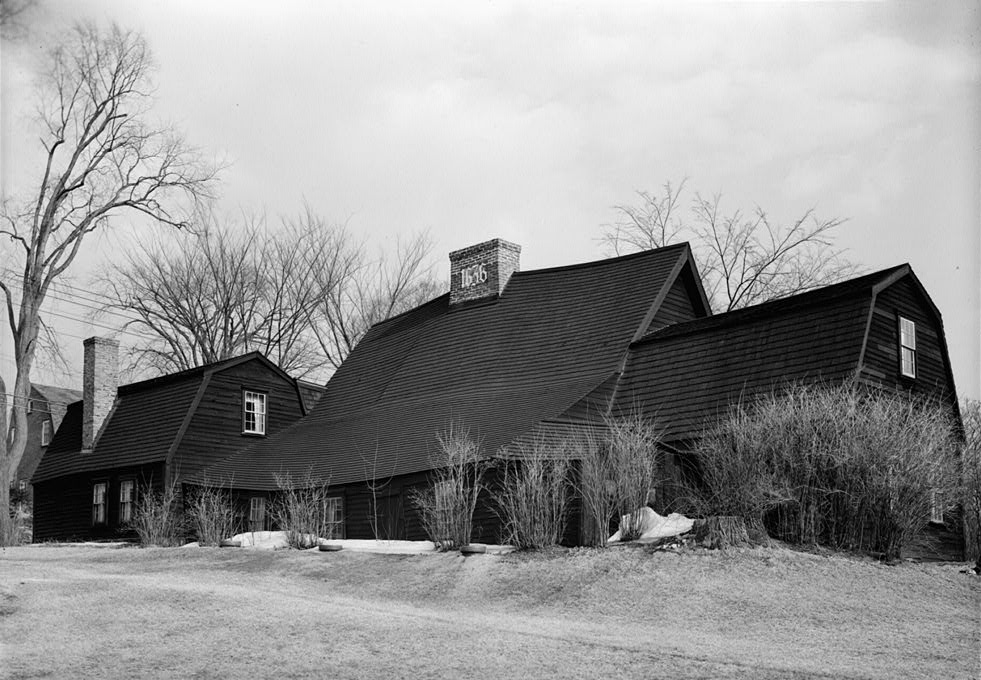
rear view of house, 1940

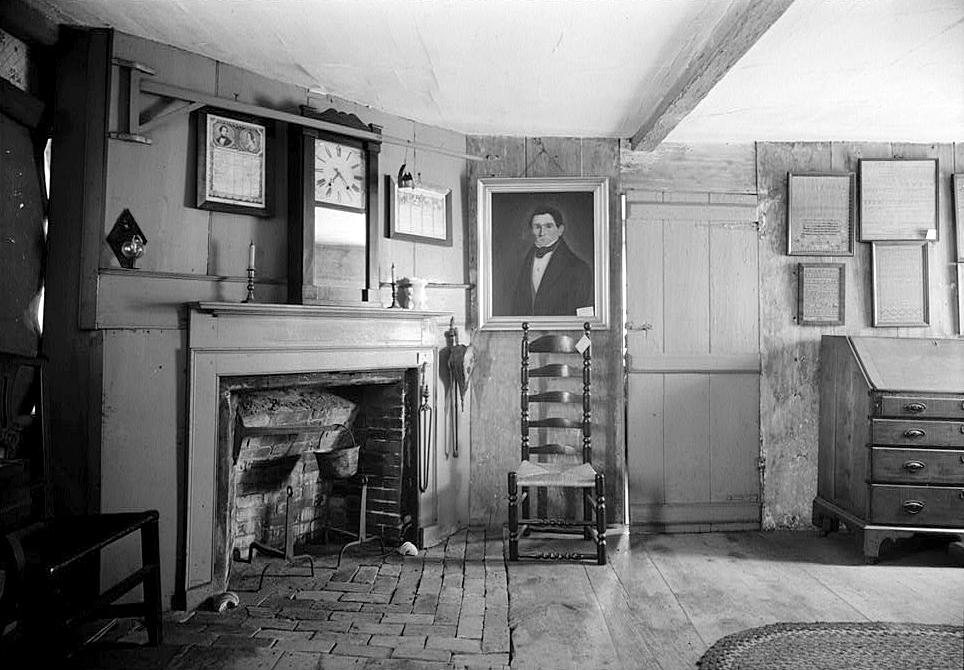
First floor parlor in 18th century addition

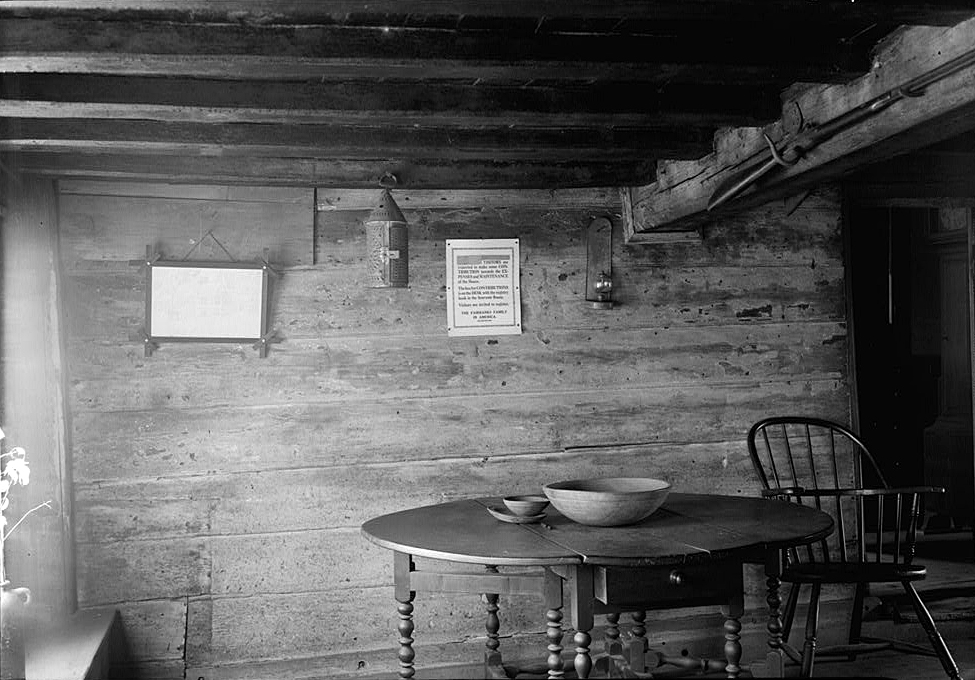
Kitchen west wall in original center portion of house

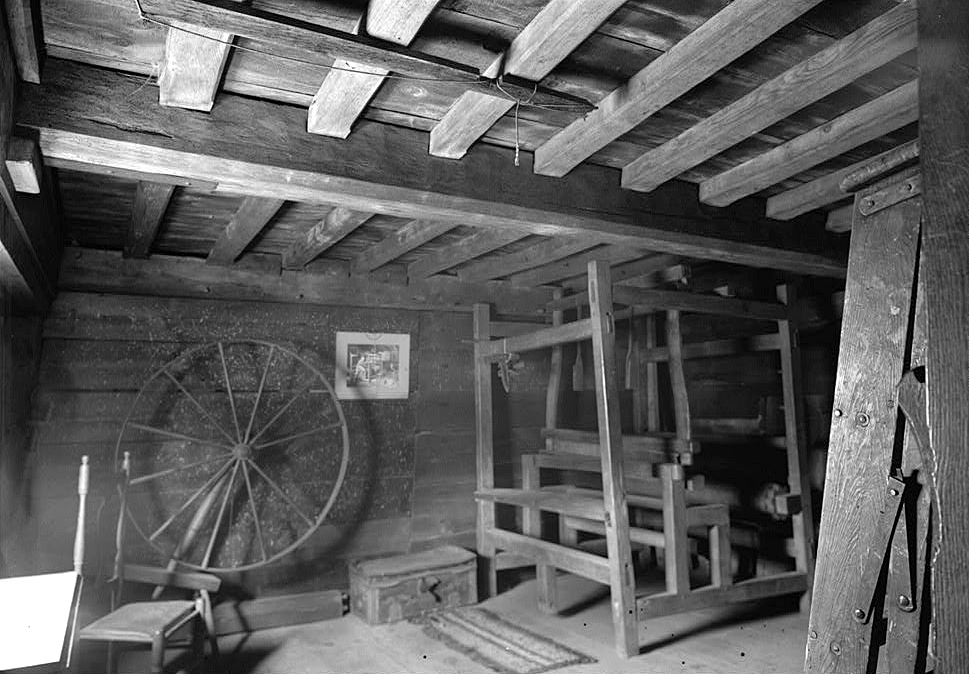
Second floor workroom in original center portion of house

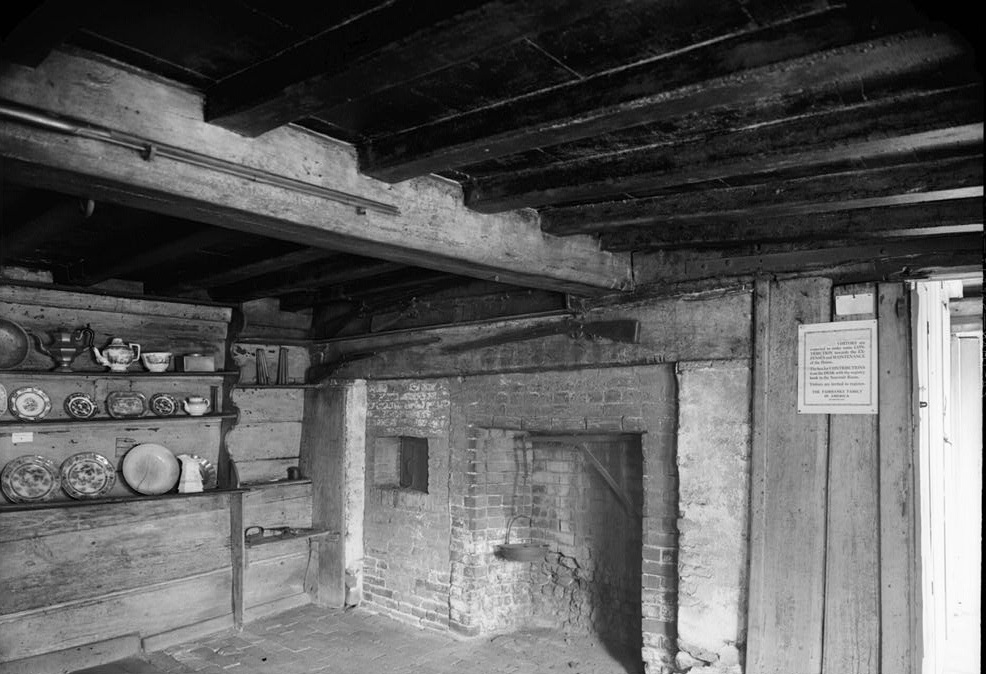
The kitchen

== See also ==
- List of the oldest buildings in the United States
- First Period houses in Massachusetts (1620–1659)
- List of the oldest buildings in Massachusetts
- List of National Historic Landmarks in Massachusetts
- National Register of Historic Places listings in Norfolk County, Massachusetts

== Works cited ==
- Parr, James L. (2009). Dedham: Historic and Heroic Tales From Shiretown. The History Press. ISBN 978-1-59629-750-0.
