= Charlotte Fairbanks =

American medical doctor (1871–1932)

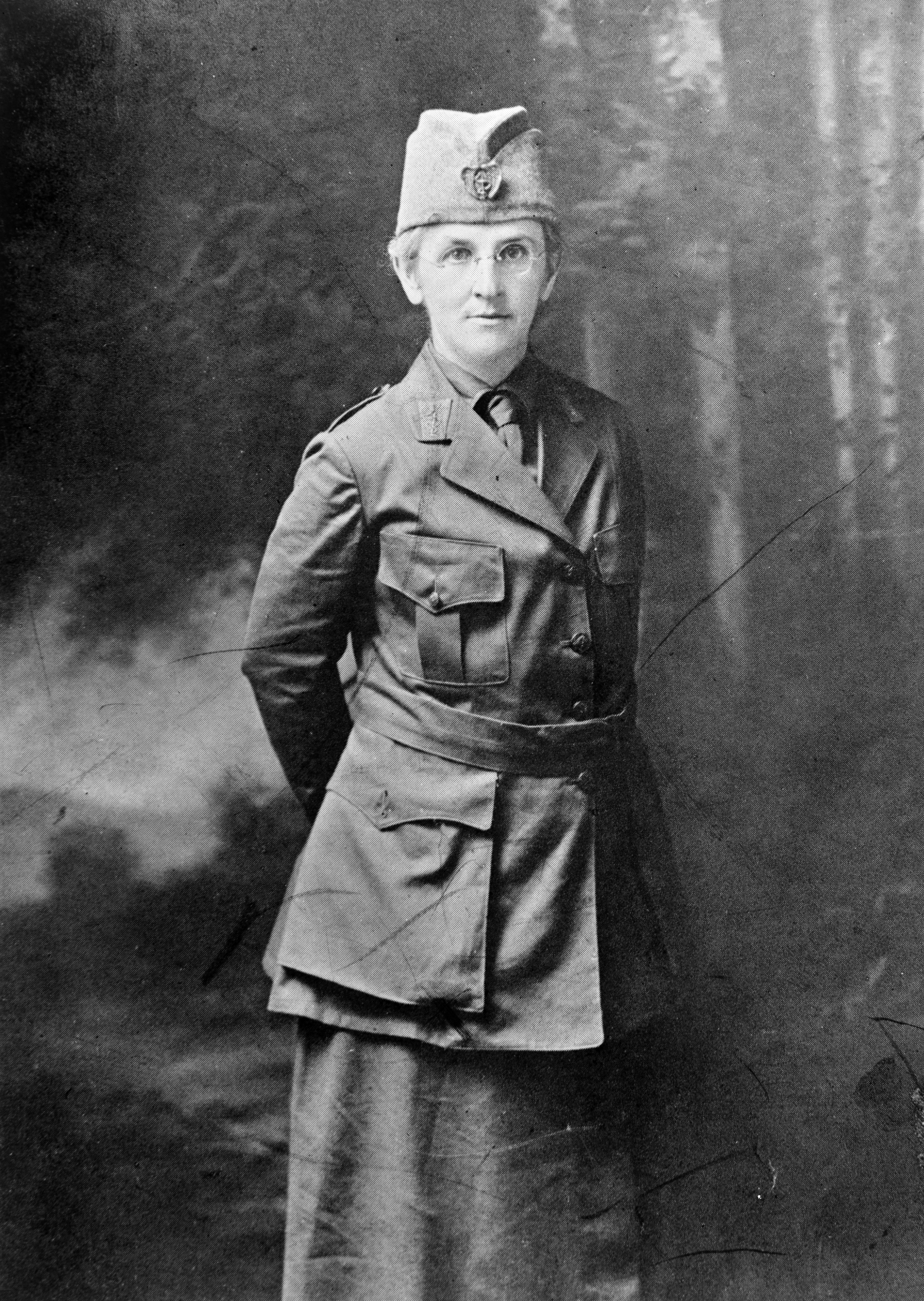
- Born: December 11, 1871; St. Johnsbury, Vermont
- Died: February 15, 1932 (aged 60)
- Resting place: St. Johnsbury, Vermont
- Education: Smith College; Yale University; University of Pennsylvania
- Occupations: Physician and Chemist
- Known for: Women's Medical Hospital, France

Charlotte Fairbanks (December 11, 1871 – February 15, 1932) was an American medical doctor and chemist. She earned a B.A. from Smith college in 1894, and graduated with a Ph.D. in chemistry from Yale at the age of 25. By this time she had published three papers discussing analytical chemistry. She was the granddaughter of Thaddeus Fairbanks, who was a well-known inventor at the time. Fairbanks earned her M.D. and became a practicing physician in 1902. At the beginning of WWI, Fairbanks joined the American Women's Hospital unit in France and was stationed in Luzancy, France, where she spent a year as the chief surgeon at the hospital. For her efforts, she was awarded the Medal of French Gratitude, and was awarded French citizenship. She returned after the war and opened a practice in her hometown of St. Johnsbury, where she was an active member of the community.

== Early life and education ==
Charlotte Fairbanks was born on December 11, 1871, to Reverend Harry Fairbanks and Lady Fairbanks in St. Johnsbury Vermont. Her grandfather, Thaddeus Fairbanks, was well known in the community for inventing a more accurate weighing scale, known as the Fairbanks scales. Fairbanks graduated with a bachelor's degree from Smith College in 1894 at the age of twenty-three. After earning her degree, she proceeded to attend Yale University's graduate program, where she conducted analytical chemistry research in the laboratory of Frank Gooch. She published three papers during her time at Yale, and she graduated in 1896 as the second woman to receive a Ph.D. from Yale in chemistry. Following her graduation, she held a fellowship with Bryn Mawr College until 1887, when she began teaching at Wellesley College for three years. In 1902 she graduated with a M.D. from the University of Pennsylvania, where she practiced until 1908. She moved to her hometown St. Johnsbury and opened a medical practice. She was also a member of the American College of Surgery. After WWI Fairbanks returned to her home in St. Johnsbury and continued to work until her death in 1932.

== War time ==
Towards the end of WWI there was a call for the aid in the war. Fairbanks joined the Women's Medical Hospital in Luzancy, France, where she spent a year as head surgeon. In one report on the hospital, M. Louise Hurrell remarked on the Fairbanks and her job operating on a particularly mangled hand of an American soldier. "However, realizing that anyone can amputate, but only a clever surgeon can save, an attempt was made at preservation…our surgeon put together the fragments, and the way in which she and our nurses worked over the hand for succeeding weeks only the patient and themselves can tell." For her efforts in France, Fairbanks was awarded the Medal of French Gratitude and an honorary French citizenship.
