= St. Johnsbury Academy =

Coordinates: 44.41651°N 72.01952°W

- St. Johnsbury, Vermont, United States

Information
- Type: Private, boarding
- Motto: SEMPER DISCENS — Always Learning
- Denomination: None
- Established: 1842; 184 years ago
- Headmaster: Dr. Sharon Howell
- Faculty: 220
- Enrollment: Approx. 1000
- Average class size: 12 students
- Student to teacher ratio: 8 to 1
- Campus: 50 acres (0.6 km^{2})
- Colors: Green and white
- Athletics: Over 40 interscholastic sports
- Athletics conference: VPA Division I
- Mascot: Hilltopper
- Website: www.stjacademy.org

St. Johnsbury Academy (SJA) is an independent, private, coeducational, non-profit boarding and day school located in St. Johnsbury, Vermont, in the United States. The academy enrolls students in grades 9-12. It was founded by Thaddeus Fairbanks, and accepts the majority of its students through one of the nation's oldest voucher systems. It has a sister school, St. Johnsbury Academy Jeju in Jeju Island, South Korea.

== History ==
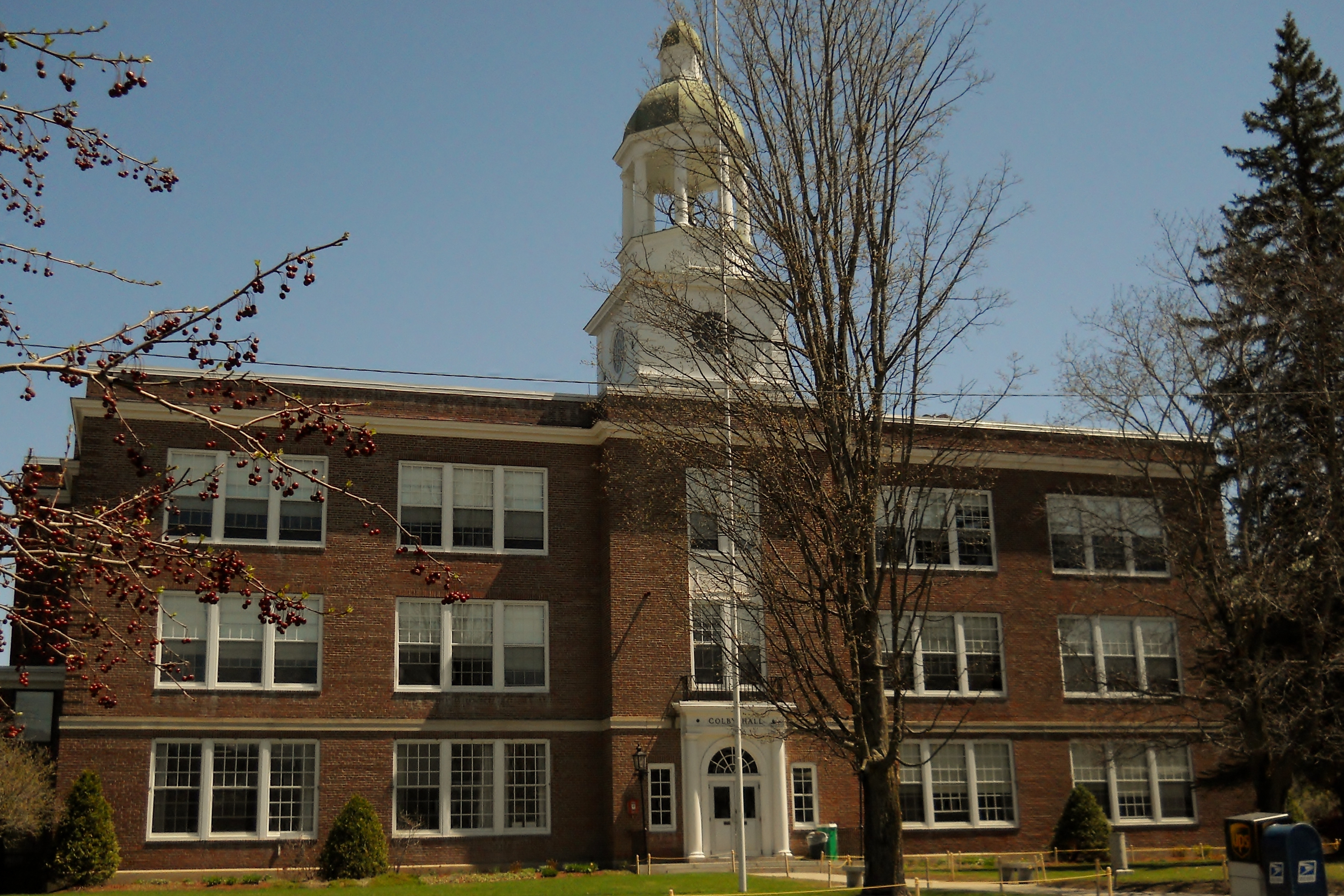
Colby Hall

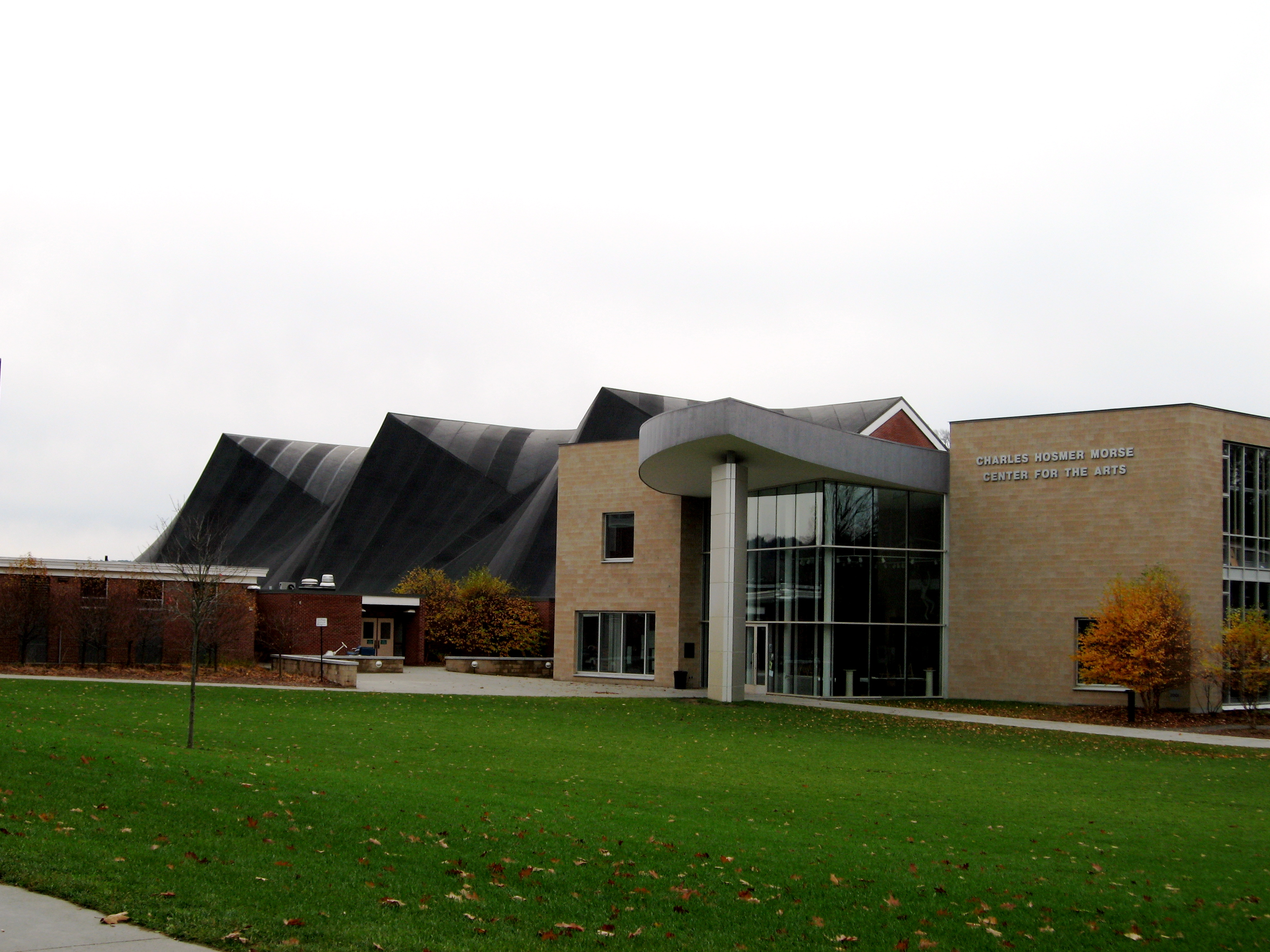
Charles Hosmer Morse Center for the Arts

St. Johnsbury Academy was founded in 1842 by Erastus, Thaddeus, and Joseph Fairbanks, to provide "intellectual, moral, and religious training for their own children and the children of the community." The school was reincorporated in 1873 in order to accomplish the founders' goal of providing educational opportunities to a wider range for students beyond those destined for the liberal arts colleges and universities.

The school has one of the nation's oldest voucher systems. The academy was established in 1842 at a time when public schooling had yet to become common. When many local governments began establishing public schools, towns and regions with established and quality private institutions in some cases relied on these schools rather than build public facilities.

One of the original buildings contributed by the Fairbanks in 1873, North Hall, burned on March 6, 1956. Work began promptly on its replacement, Ranger Hall. The South Hall was built in 1870 to house the students and teachers at a total cost of $36,000 and the total cost to build and equip the Academy was $103,000, which was subsidized by the Fairbanks.

John Negroponte delivered the commencement address in 2006. He was then the first Director of National Intelligence of the United States. In addition, the school has had a number of notable alumni and attendees.

== Administration ==
Students from the town of St. Johnsbury and related towns without a high school apply for admission to the Academy. Their tuition has been funded by payments from their town of origin. Tuition from these towns and from St. Johnsbury provided 44% of the annual operating budget of $14 million in 2007. Vermont law requires towns not operating schools to pay tuition to other approved schools for students in the grades not provided up to the Average Announced Tuition for union schools.

The resident program encompasses almost 260 resident students from over 30 countries.

== Accreditation ==
The Academy is fully accredited by the New England Association of Schools and Colleges and approved by the Vermont State Department of Education. It is a member of the National Association of Independent Schools, the Independent School Association of Northern New England, and the Vermont Independent Schools Association. In addition, the Academy is a member of the College Board.

== Athletics ==
Geographically, the academy competes in both the Northern Vermont Athletic Conference (NVAC) Mountain and the NVAC East Leagues depending on the sport. It usually competes in Division I by size.

The boys' track and field team has won 34 Division I state championships, most recently in 2023. The boys' indoor track and field team won Division I state championship for the first time in 2012, and won again in 2017, 2018, and 2023. The girl's indoor track and field team won Division 1 state championships in 2015, 2016, 2017, 2018 and 2019. The girl's outdoor track and field team won Division 1 state championships in 2015, 2016, 2017, 2018 and 2019. The boys' baseball team won the Vermont state championship for Division I in 1912, 1993, 2006 and 2016. The softball team won the Vermont state championship for Division 2 in 1984 and 1986. The boys' basketball team won the Vermont State championship for Division I in 1981, 1982, 1997, and 2019. The girls' basketball team won the Vermont State Championships for Division I in 2010. 2018, and 2019. Division 2 titles were won in 1981, 1982, 1984, and 1985.

The Gymnastics team won the Vermont State Championship in 1997, 2002 - 2005.

The boys' ice hockey team won the Vermont State Championships for Division 3 in 1994, 1996, 2001 and 2003.

The football team won the Vermont state championship for Division I in 1966, 1968, and 2017. The football team won the Vermont state championship for Division II in 1961, 1982 and 1994.

The football team also competes in one of New England's oldest football rivalries. In 1894 the first game was played between St. Johnsbury Academy and Lyndon Institute. With the completion of the 2025 rivalry game, 120 games have been played between the two schools, with the Academy winning 70, LI winning 44, with six ties.

== Programs ==
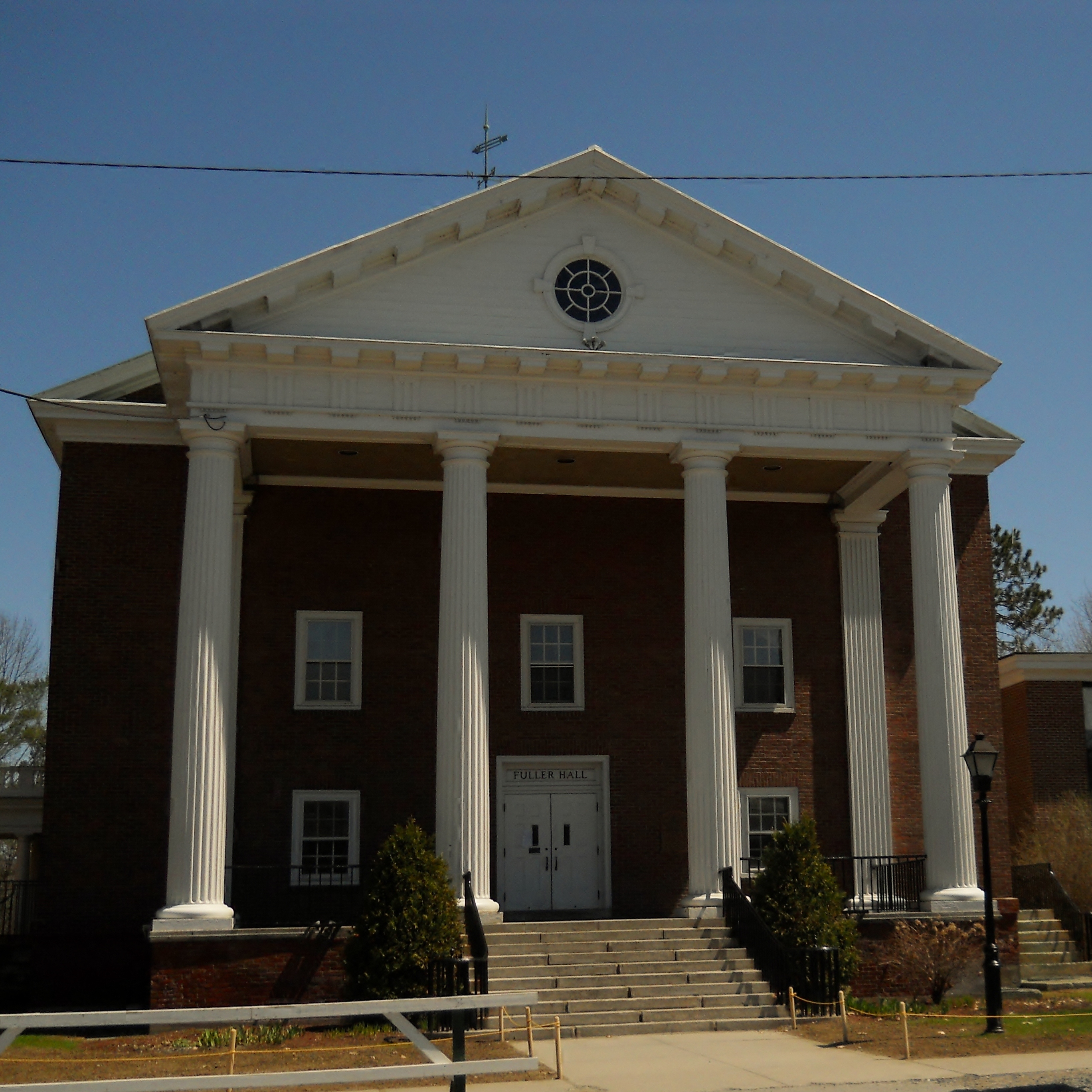
Fuller Hall

The Colwell Center for Global Understanding is in the Mayo center. It was founded in 2003 as the gift of the family of Stephen B. Colwell. The center supports programs and activities intended to foster global education aimed not only at the school but at the surrounding community. Students involved with the center give presentations to teach other students about global issues. The center sponsors a number of international clubs such as Spanish, Japanese, German, Mandarin, French, International, and environmental Clubs, The Humans Rights Alliance, and Intaglio Society. It provides teachers with the opportunity to chaperone international student trips. Two of the Colwell Center's most popular programs are the Colwell Speakers Series and the International Programs.

The Colwell Speakers Series sponsors talks and presentations from international speakers that are open to both students and the public.

The Colwell Center supports language learning, cultural understanding, and travel opportunities for students and faculty. The Center has sponsored trips abroad and exchanges for students. One study abroad opportunity is the Intaglio Society's trip to Florence, Italy. This trip allows students to study the traditional Italian art of intaglio printmaking. Students visit a number of classics in the museum and churches around Italy.

Another program is the Kaijo Exchange. Every year since 1989, a group of Japanese boys from the Kaijo Junior & Senior High School in Tokyo, Japan have come to St. Johnsbury Academy for a 10-day stay with a student host family. The Japanese students go to class with their host students and spend time touring New England.

The center formerly offered an exchange for students go to Stuttgart, Germany for about 5 weeks over their summer break. This began in 2003. The students stay with host families and go to school at the Freie Waldorfschule am Kraeherwald with their host student. At school they take classes in both German language and German history and culture. In the fall the students from Stuttgart come to stay with the Americans who stayed with them earlier that year, going to school and traveling around New England for six weeks.

== Notable alumni ==
- Dorothy Hansine Andersen (1918), American physician and researcher who first identified and named cystic fibrosis
- John L. Bacon (1881), Chelsea and Hartford banker and Vermont State Treasurer
- Albert W. Barney (1938), Chief Justice of the Vermont Supreme Court
- Helen Burbank (1917), Secretary of State of Vermont
- Calvin Coolidge (1891), 30th president of the United States 1923-1929. A postgraduate student, he had previously failed the entrance exam for Amherst College. He was given a certificate after one term at St. Johnsbury and was accepted at Amherst.
- Taylor Coppenrath (2000), professional basketball player
- Bruce Dalrymple (1983), basketball player
- Susan Dunklee (2004), U.S. team member for the 2014, 2018, and 2022 Winter Olympics
- Franklin Fairbanks, attendee; president of E & T Fairbanks and Company, donated Fairbanks Museum and Planetarium
- Frederick G. Fleetwood, U.S. Congressman
- Charles E. Gibson Jr., Vermont Attorney General
- Josiah Grout, Governor of Vermont 1896-1898; was attending Academy when the Civil War broke out and he enlisted
- Edwin Osgood Grover (1890), publisher and educator
- David Hale (1969), economist
- Charles Hosmer Morse (1850), founder of Fairbanks-Morse
- Graham S. Newell (1933), member of the Vermont State Senate and Vermont House of Representatives
- Henry O'Malley (1895), United States Commissioner of Fisheries 1922–1933
- Edwin Wallace Parker (c. 1851), bishop of the American Methodist Episcopal Mission
- George H. Prouty (c. 1880), Governor of Vermont 1906-1908
- Linda Richards (attended 1856-7), America's first trained nurse
- Jonathan Ross, US Senator from Vermont
- Charles Edward Russell (1881), muckraking journalist, NAACP co-founder, and 1927 Pulitzer Prize winner
- Robert Holbrook Smith (1898), co-founder, Alcoholics Anonymous in 1935
- Oliver M. W. Sprague, president of the American Economic Association
- Hiram R. Steele, Attorney General of Louisiana and Brooklyn District Attorney
- Charles W. Waterman, United States Senator from Colorado, 1927-1932
- Sterry R. Waterman (1918), Judge, U.S. Court of Appeals for the Second Circuit, 1955–1970
- Caroline S. Woodruff (1884), educator, president of Castleton University, president of National Education Association
- Charles Woodruff (1860s), fought in American Civil War; Brigadier General, US Army
- Mary Parker Woodworth (1849-1919), writer and speaker
