= Franklin Fairbanks =

American politician

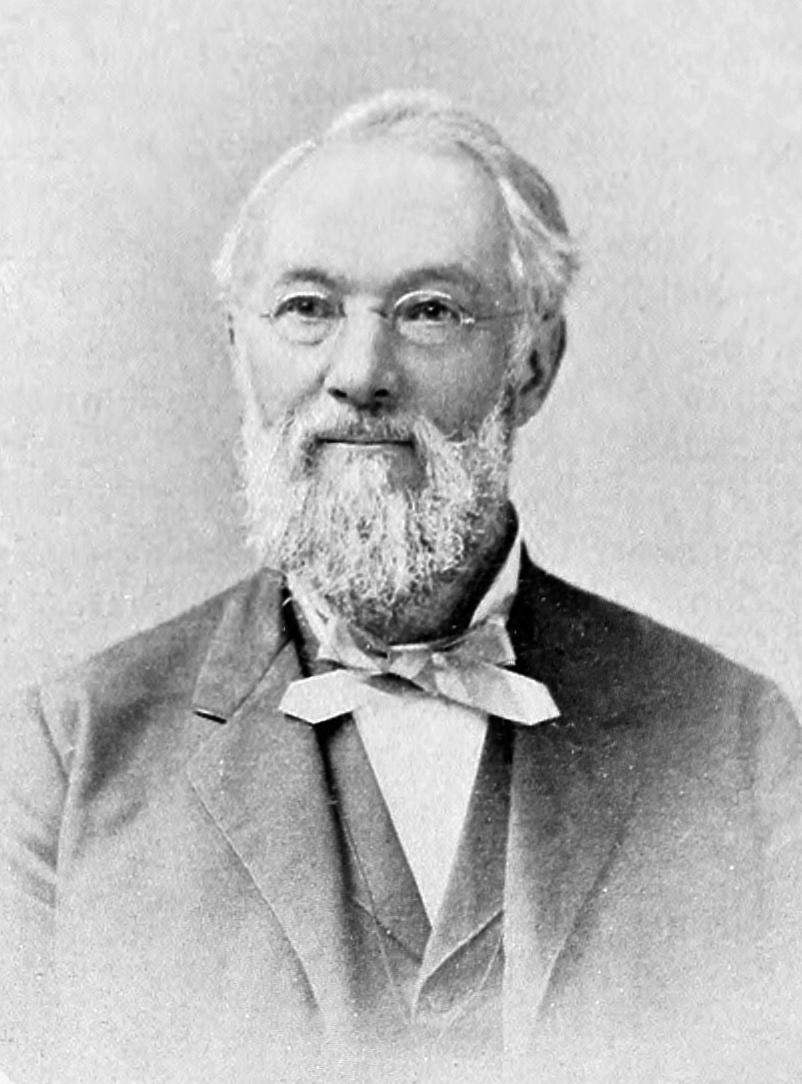

Speaker of the Vermont House of Representatives
- In office 1872–1874
- Preceded by: Charles Herbert Joyce
- Succeeded by: Horace Henry Powers

Member of the Vermont House of Representatives
- In office 1870–1874

Delegate to the Vermont Republican State Committee from Caledonia County
- In office 1863–1875

Moderator of St. Johnsbury, Vermont
- In office 1879–1884
- In office 1871–1873

Personal details
- Born: June 18, 1828 St. Johnsbury, Vermont
- Died: April 24, 1895 (aged 66) St. Johnsbury, Vermont
- Party: Whig, Republican
- Spouse: Frances Fairbanks
- Relations: Erastus Fairbanks (father); Horace Fairbanks (brother); Thaddeus Fairbanks (uncle); Ephraim Paddock (grand-uncle)
- Profession: Businessman, politician, biologist, collector

Franklin Fairbanks (June 18, 1828 – April 24, 1895) was an American businessman, natural scientist, collector, political figure, and one of the founders and first trustees of Rollins College.

== Biography ==
The son of Erastus Fairbanks, brother of Horace Fairbanks, and nephew of Thaddeus Fairbanks, Franklin Fairbanks was born in St. Johnsbury, Vermont, on June 18, 1828. At age 18, he entered Fairbanks Scales, the family business which manufactured platform scales. He became president of the company in 1888. Fairbanks was also an officer and director in a number of railroad, mining, manufacturing, banking, and telegraph businesses.

During the Civil War Fairbanks served on the staffs of Governors Hiland Hall and his father Erastus, with the rank of colonel, responsible for raising, equipping and training troops for the Union Army and dispatching them to the front lines. In addition, he supervised Fairbanks Scales' production of matériel for the war effort, including artillery harness irons and other horse tack.

A Republican, he was a longtime member of Vermont's Republican State Committee. He was Town Meeting Moderator from 1871 to 1873 and 1879 to 1884. He was also a member of the Vermont House of Representatives and served as Speaker from 1872 to 1874. In 1877 he received an honorary Master of Arts (M.A.) degree from Dartmouth College.

Fairbanks was a trustee of St. Johnsbury Academy. He donated the Fairbanks Museum and Planetarium to the town of St. Johnsbury., along with his collection of natural science specimens and related artifacts.

Fairbanks came to Winter Park, Florida, in 1881 with his friend and business associate, Charles Hosmer Morse, who was also from St. Johnsbury. Fairbanks was one of the founders of the city, and was one of the first investors to purchase lakefront property. Fairbanks contributed to the founding of Rollins College and was one of its first trustees.

== Death and burial ==
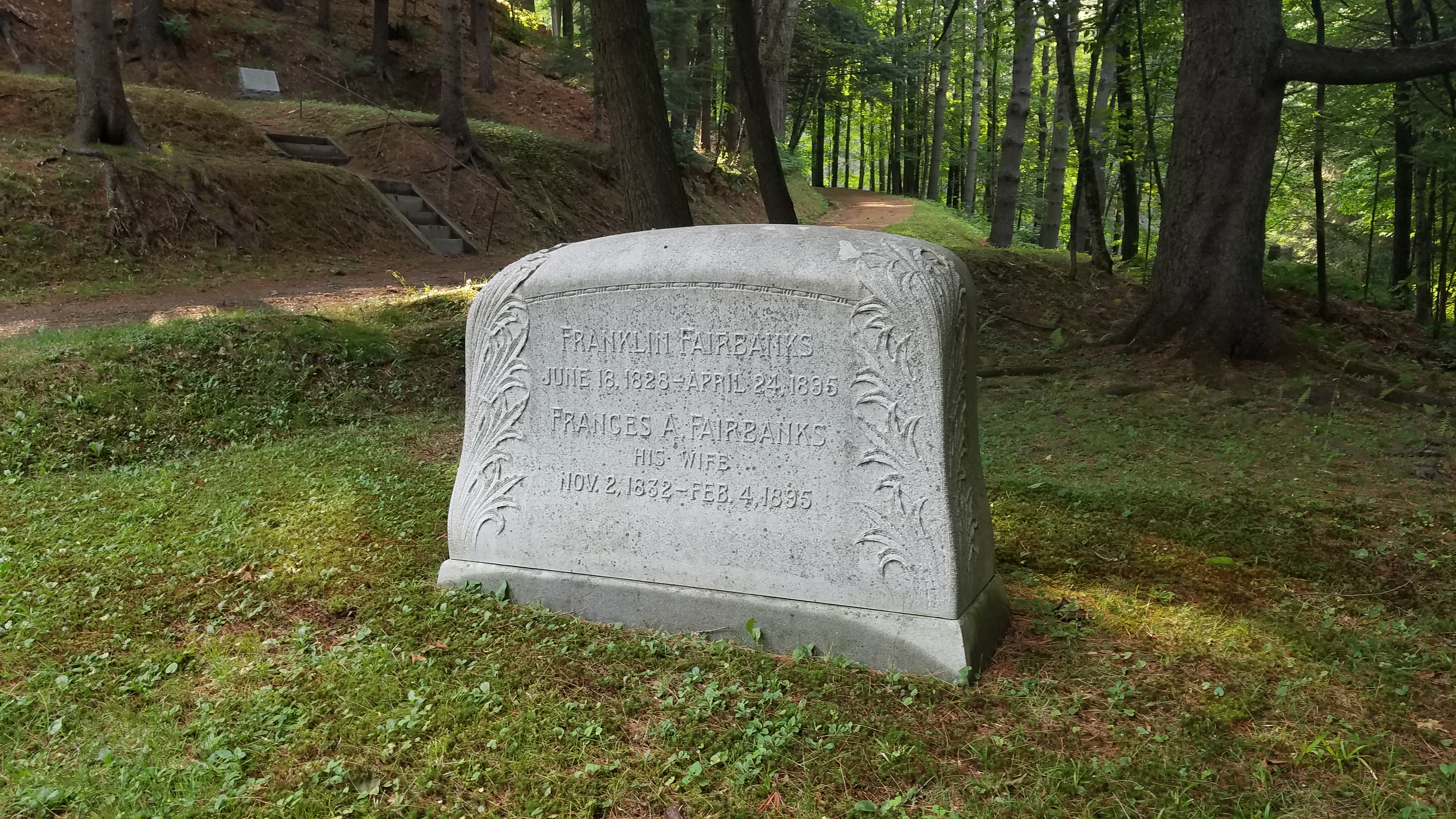
The grave of Franklin Fairbanks and his wife in St. Johnsbury

Franklin Fairbanks died in St. Johnsbury on April 24, 1895. He was buried at Mount Pleasant Cemetery in St. Johnsbury.

== Legacy ==
Fairbanks' house in St. Johnsbury, at 30 Western Avenue, is on the list of the National Register of Historic Places.

The annual Franklin Fairbanks Award is presented to individuals who have made positive contributions to the operation and direction of the Fairbanks Museum.

== Notes ==
Political offices
Preceded by Charles Herbert Joyce	Speaker of the Vermont House of Representatives; 1872–1874	Succeeded by H. Henry Powers
