= Thaddeus Fairbanks =

American inventor (1796–1886)

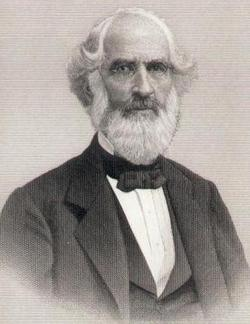
- Fairbanks, circa 1880
- Born: January 16, 1796; Brimfield, Massachusetts
- Died: April 12, 1886 (aged 90); St. Johnsbury, Vermont
- Resting place: Mount Pleasant Cemetery, St. Johnsbury, Vermont
- Occupations: Inventor; Businessman
- Employer: E. & T. Fairbanks
- Known for: Inventor of the Fairbanks scale
- Spouse: Lucy Peck Barker (m. 1820–1866, her death)
- Children: 2 (including Charlotte Fairbanks)
- Relatives: Erastus Fairbanks (brother); Ephraim Paddock (uncle); Horace Fairbanks (nephew); Franklin Fairbanks (nephew)

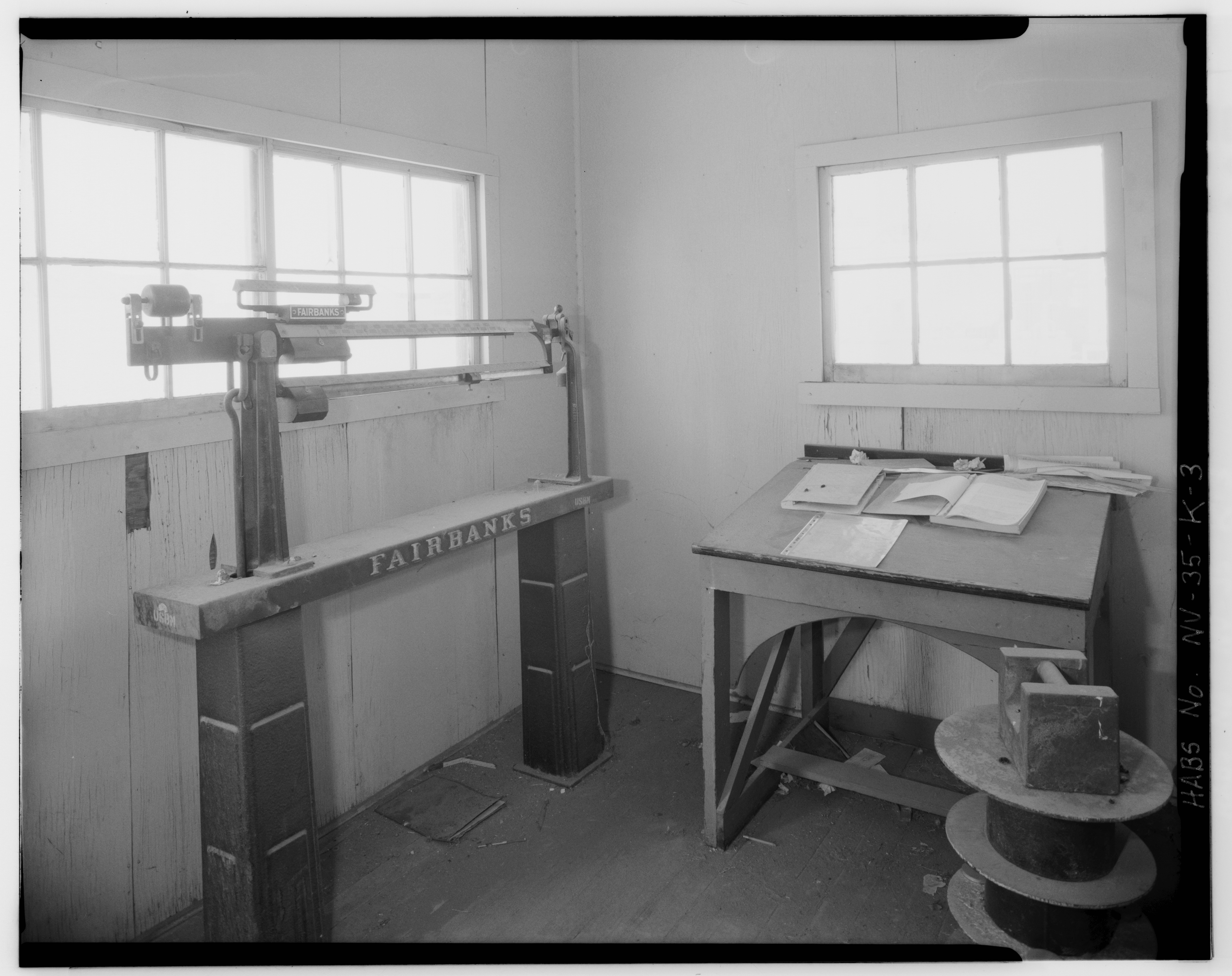
Fairbanks beam scale and log table - Bureau of Mines Weigh Station, Boulder City, Nevada

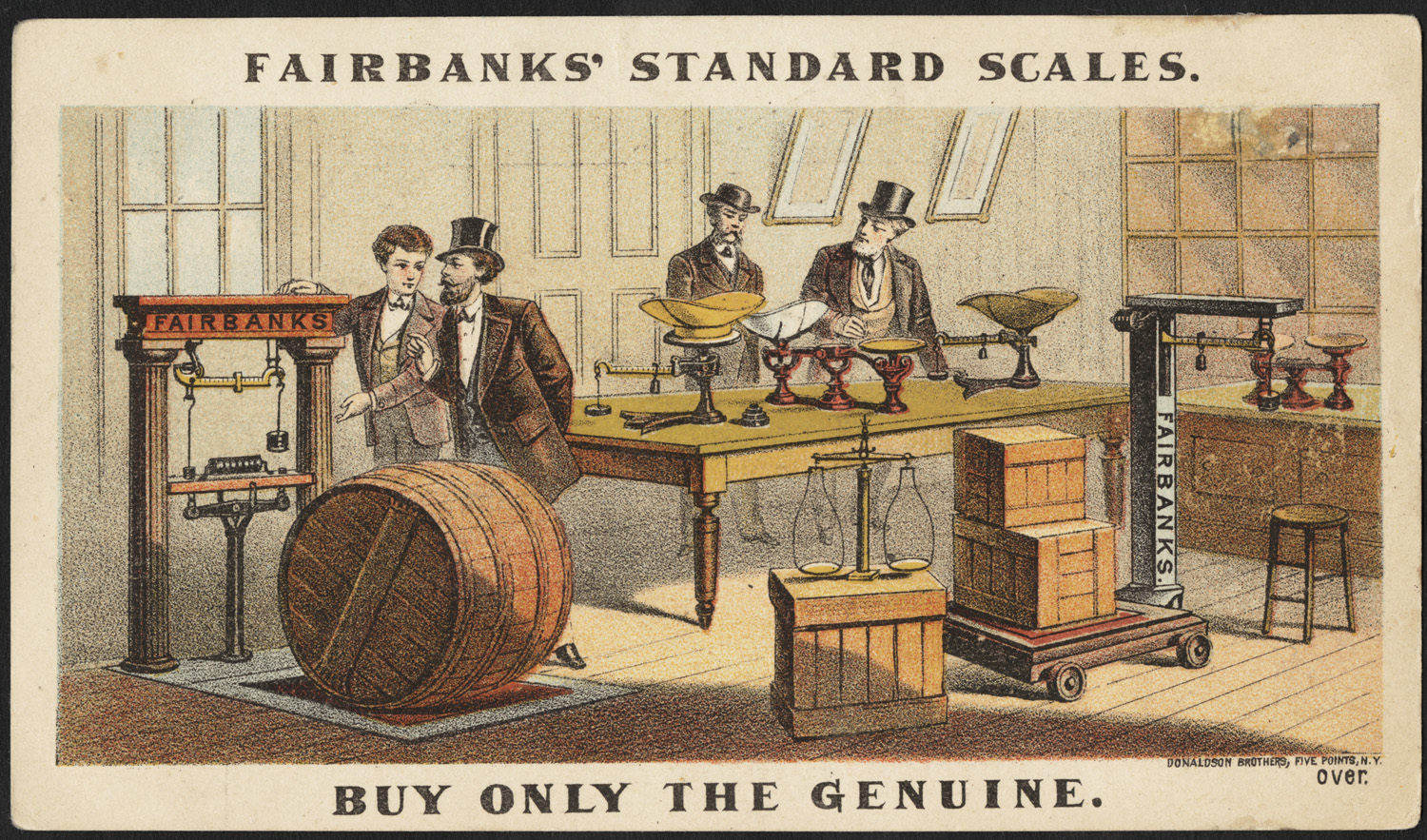
Fairbanks platform and table scales

Thaddeus Fairbanks (January 17, 1796 – April 12, 1886) was an American businessman, mechanic, and engineer. He invented furnaces, cooking stoves, cast iron steel plows, and other metal items related to farming. He invented and manufactured the first platform scale, the Fairbanks scale, that allowed the accurate weighing of large objects. His scales revolutionized farming and manufacturing and were sold worldwide, and he received numerous honors and awards for his development of the technology. Fairbanks was also a philanthropist, and was a co-founder of the St. Johnsbury Academy.

== Early life ==
Fairbanks was born in the town of Brimfield, Massachusetts, on January 16, 1796, the second of three sons of Joseph Fairbanks and Phebe (née Paddock) Fairbanks. He was educated in the schools of Brimfield while working on the family farm in his spare time, and showed a natural inclination toward mechanics.

Fairbanks made a woodworking shop above his father's sawmill and gristmill, which were powered by the Sleepers River in St. Johnsbury, where he made carriages until 1824. He then constructed an iron foundry, with his brother Erastus joining him in the establishment of E. & T. Fairbanks to make furnaces, cooking stoves, cast iron plows, and farm implements. Thaddeus Fairbanks was the mechanical technician behind the company's inventions while Erastus was the businessman who marketed the products. In 1826, Fairbanks was granted a patent for a refrigerator and a cast iron plow.

== Career ==
In 1830, Fairbanks patented a hemp-and-flax-dressing device called a Haynes machine and became the general manager of the Saint Johnsbury Hemp Company. This enterprise included mechanical scales that suspended heavy objects from log beams to weigh the large loads of hemp straw brought in by farmers; these scales which were not accurate, making it difficult to determine how much to pay sellers for their product.

After experimenting with designs for a more accurate weighing method, Fairbanks devised a platform scale, which revolutionized the farming and business worlds by making it easy to weigh large containers. By allowing a wagon or railroad car to be placed on the scale, to be weighed while full and empty, the Fairbanks scale enabled accurate weighing of products and payment to the sellers. Fairbanks received a patent on the platform scale, which his brothers advised him to produce and sell. In 1834, Fairbanks and his brothers Erastus and Joseph formed E. & T. Fairbanks Company to make and market the Fairbanks platform scale.

Fairbanks scales were displayed at ten international expositions including London, Paris, Vienna, Philadelphia, Chicago, Buffalo and St. Louis, where they were awarded gold and silver medals for technological advancement. Thaddeus Fairbanks received many foreign awards, including a knighthood and the Imperial Order of Franz Joseph from the Emperor of Austria. He also received a gold medal from the King of Siam, and medals and honors from the Bey of Tunis.

Fairbanks scales became popular worldwide and units sold overseas included the metric system and the numerals of the country where they were sold (i.e. Chinese characters). In 1874, the business partnership was incorporated as the Fairbanks Scale Company. By 1885, 1,000 workers were employed at the main factory in St. Johnsbury and they manufactured 70,000 scales a year. Other factories were established in Asian and African countries, including Russia, Holland, Cuba, Siam, and Japan. In 1916, the E. & T. Fairbanks Company was reincorporated as Fairbanks, Morse & Company. Ownership has since changed hands several times but Fairbanks platform scales are still made in Saint Johnsbury, Vermont.

== Personal life ==
In 1820 Fairbanks married Lucy Peck Barker (1798–1866). They had five children, two of whom lived to adulthood. His daughter Charlotte (1836–1869) was the wife of Reverend George N. Webber. His son Reverend Henry Fairbanks (1830–1918) cared for Fairbanks in his last years. Fairbanks received over forty patents in his lifetime, the forty-third one being granted to him at the age 90. On March 31, 1886, Fairbanks fell and broke his hip and it did not heal properly. He died on April 12, 1886, and was buried at Mount Pleasant Cemetery in St. Johnsbury.

In addition to his brother Erastus, Fairbanks' relatives included uncle Ephraim Paddock and nephews Franklin Fairbanks and Horace Fairbanks.

== Philanthropy ==
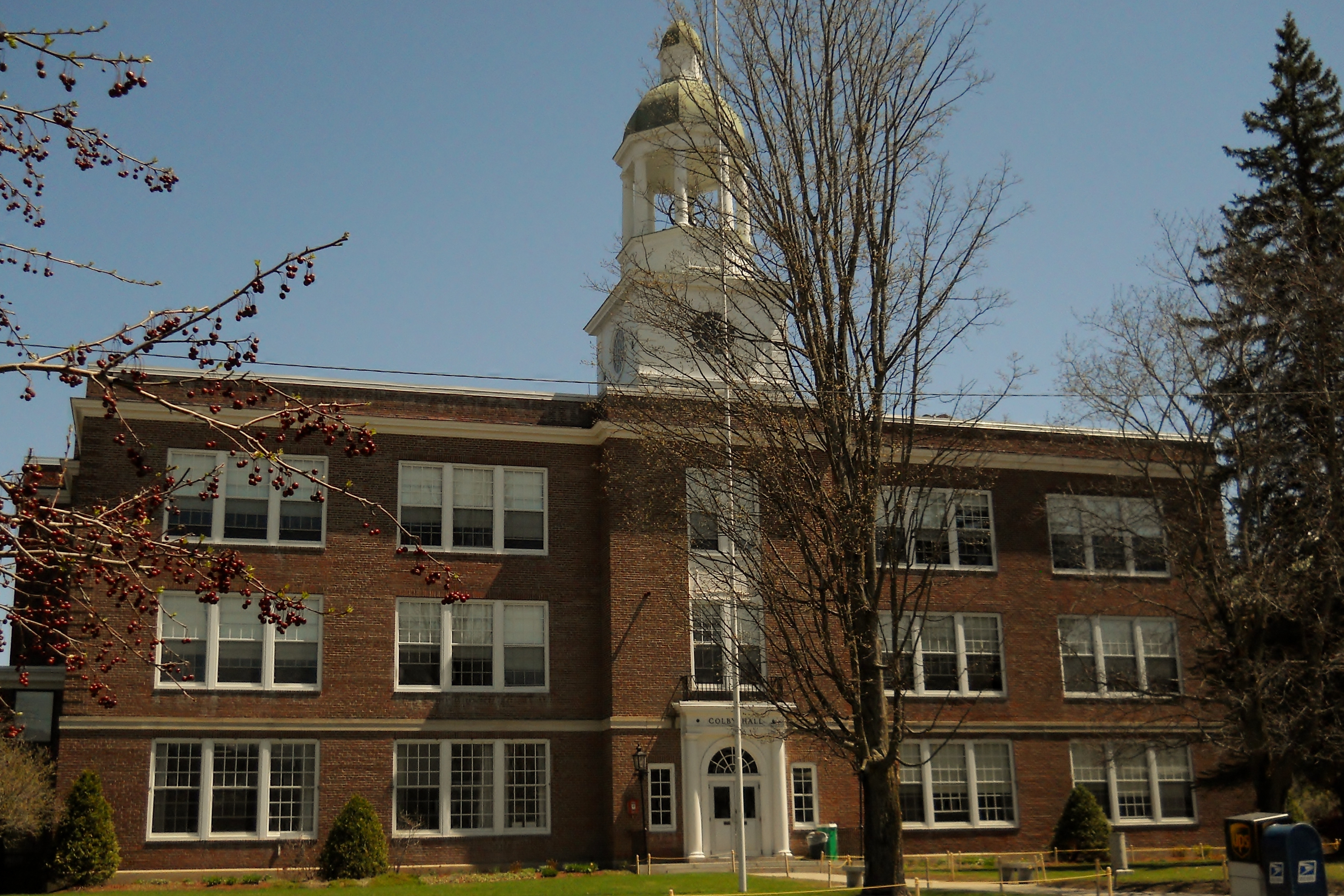
St. Johnsbury Academy, Colby Hall

Fairbanks was involved in numerous charitable and civic endeavors, including the 1842 founding of the St. Johnsbury Academy. He originally paid $50,000 (equivalent to $1,861,000 in 2025) for the construction of a red brick building of Norman-Gothic Tudor style. The academy later added South Hall at a cost to Fairbanks of $36,000 (equivalent to $1,340,000 in 2025). In 1872 Fairbanks erected larger modern brick structures at a cost of $200,000 (equivalent to $5,375,000 in 2025). In 1873 the academy was reincorporated as a school of grades 9-12 for all boys and girls.

Other philanthropic and civic endeavors in which Fairbanks took part included serving on the board of trustees of Middlebury College and donating to the missionary and educational activities of the Congregational church. In 1851, Middlebury awarded Fairbanks the honorary degree of Master of Arts.

== Gallery ==
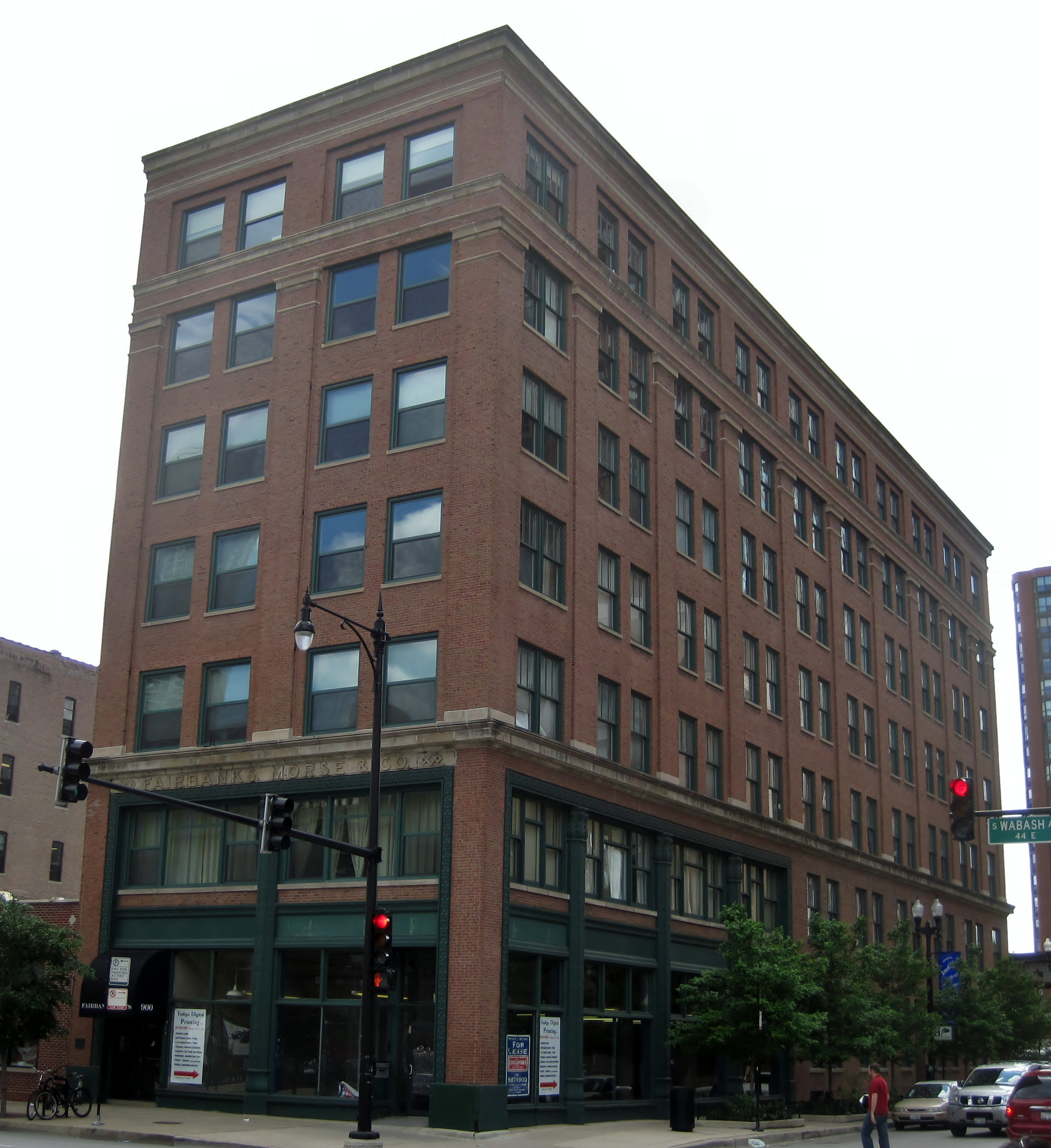
Fairbanks, Morse & Company national headquarters building

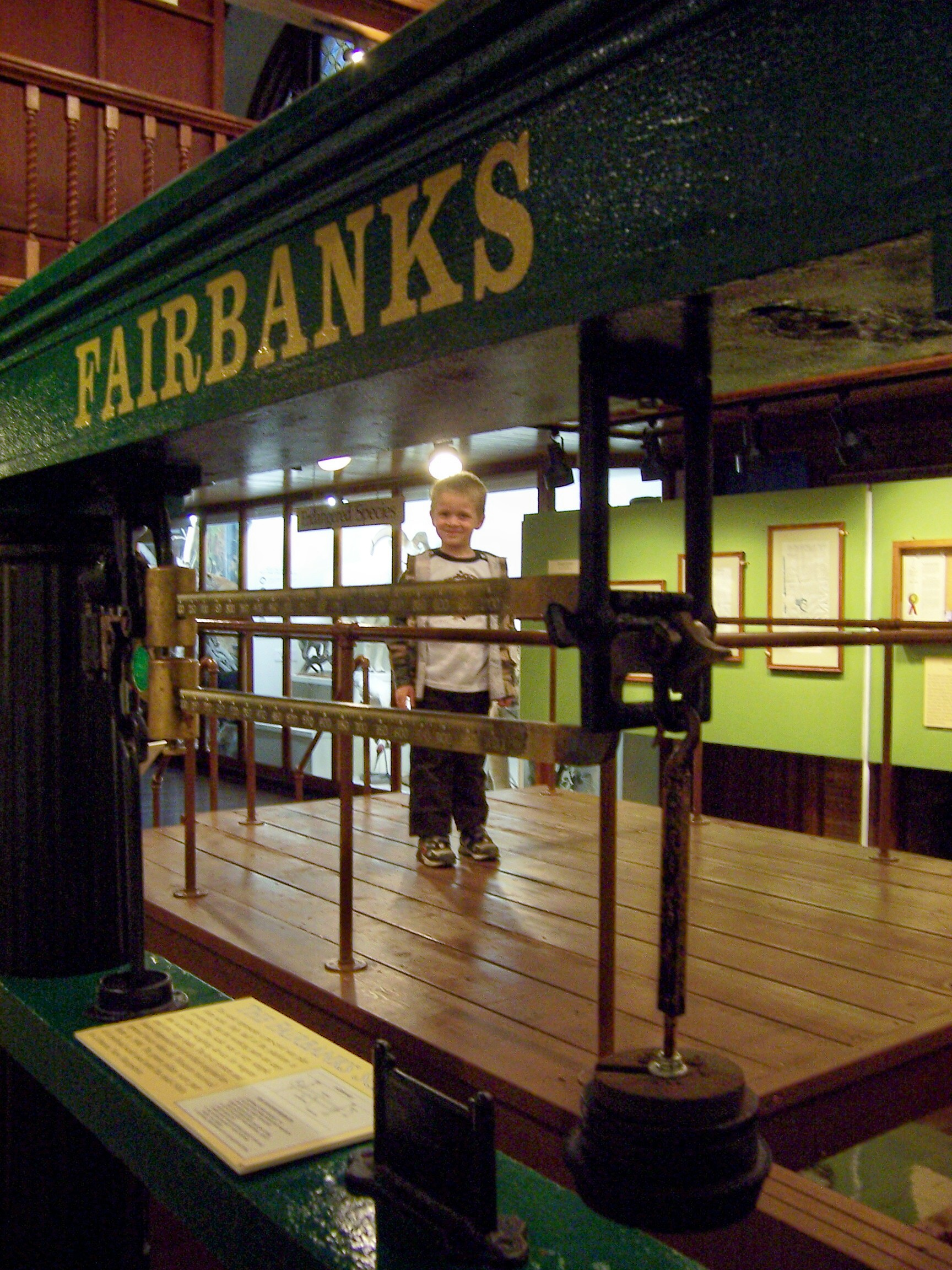
Very large Fairbanks beam scale

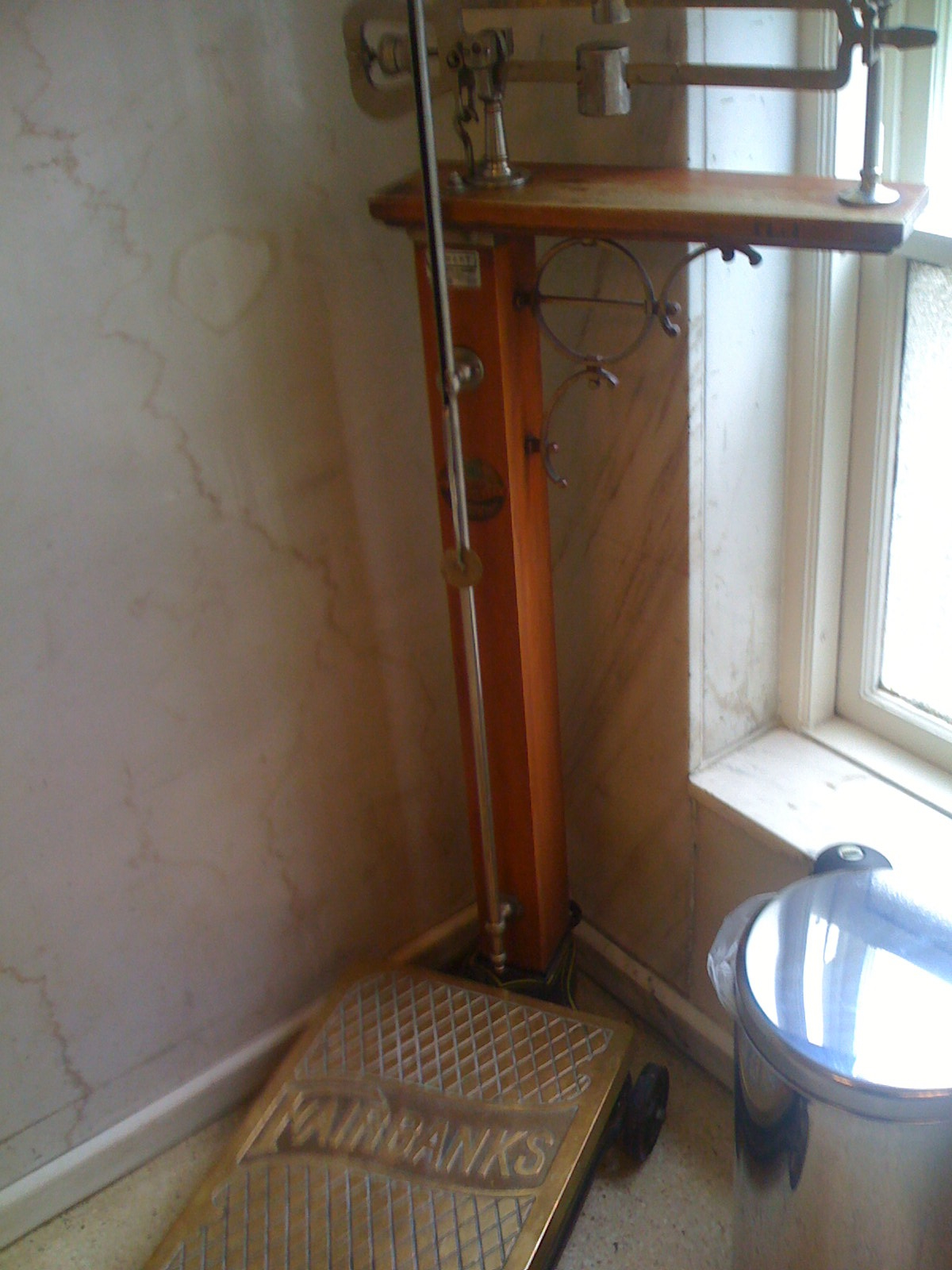
Fairbanks hybrid beam scale

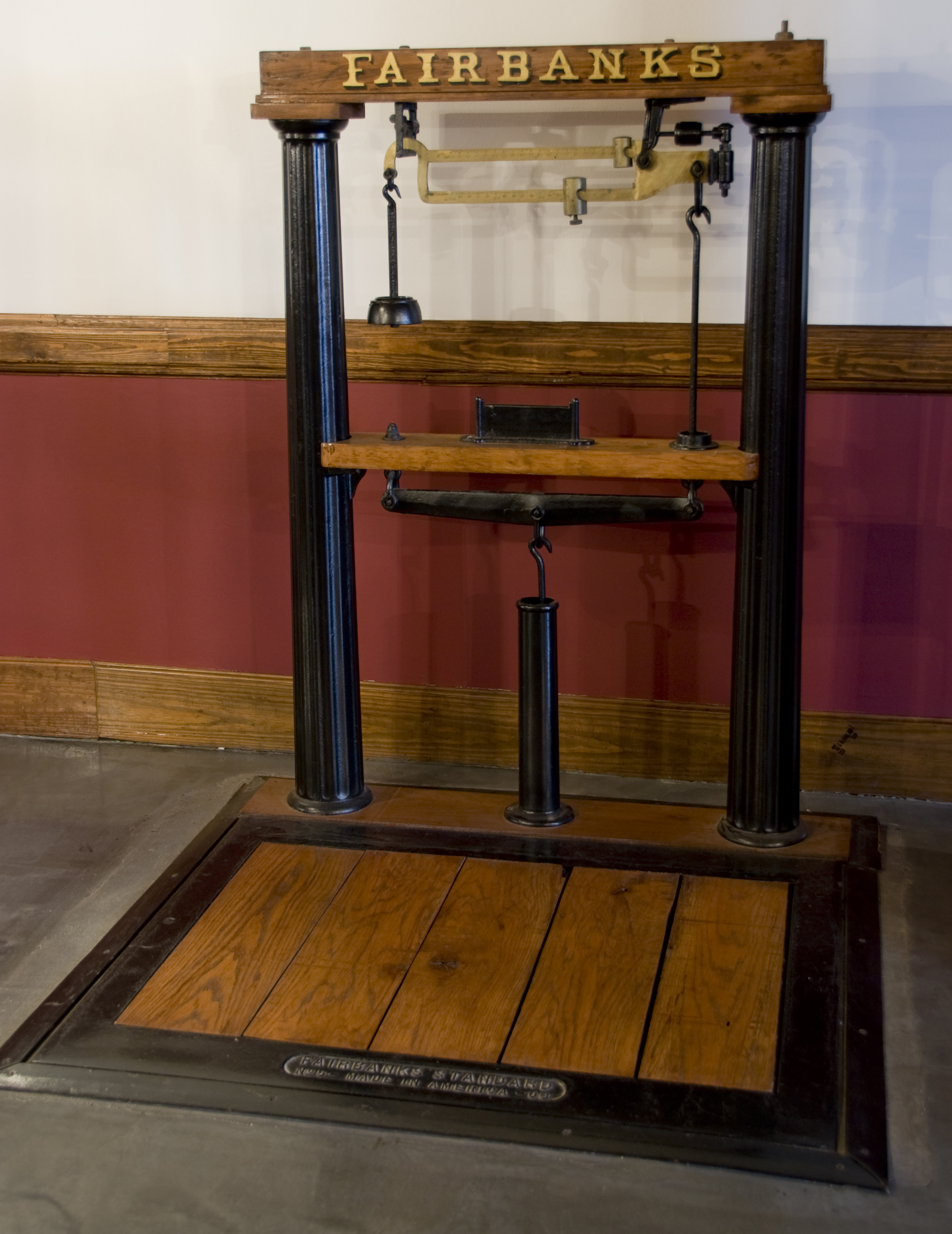
Fairbanks platform scale

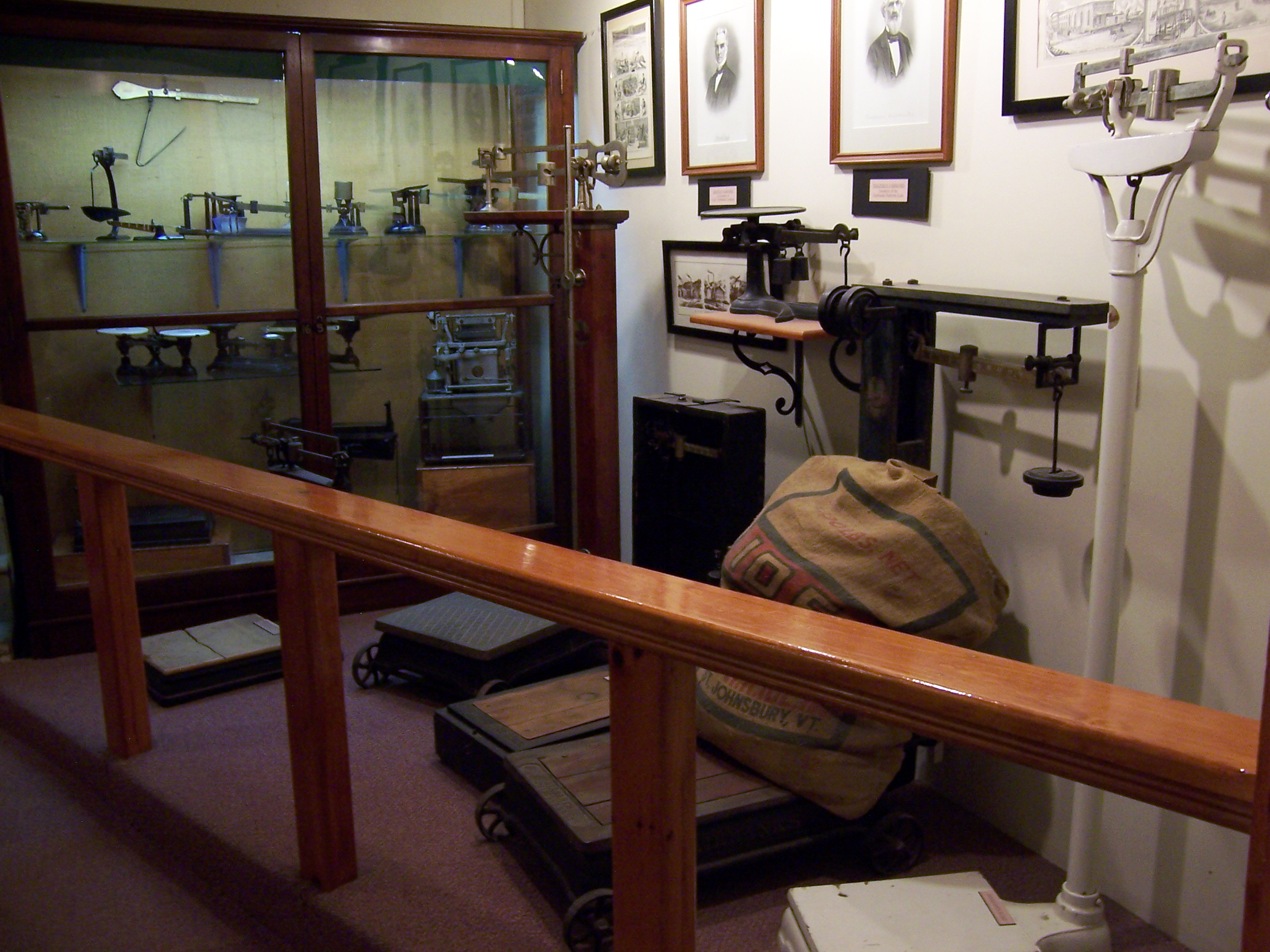
Various Fairbanks scales

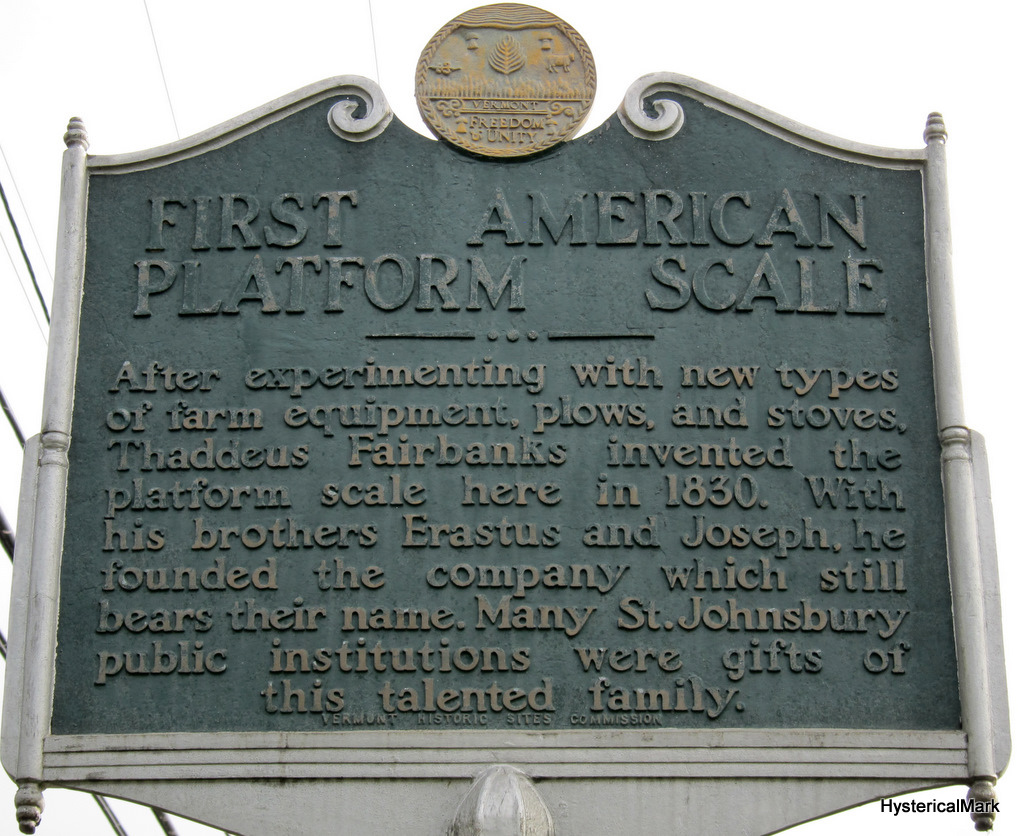
Fairbanks Historical Marker

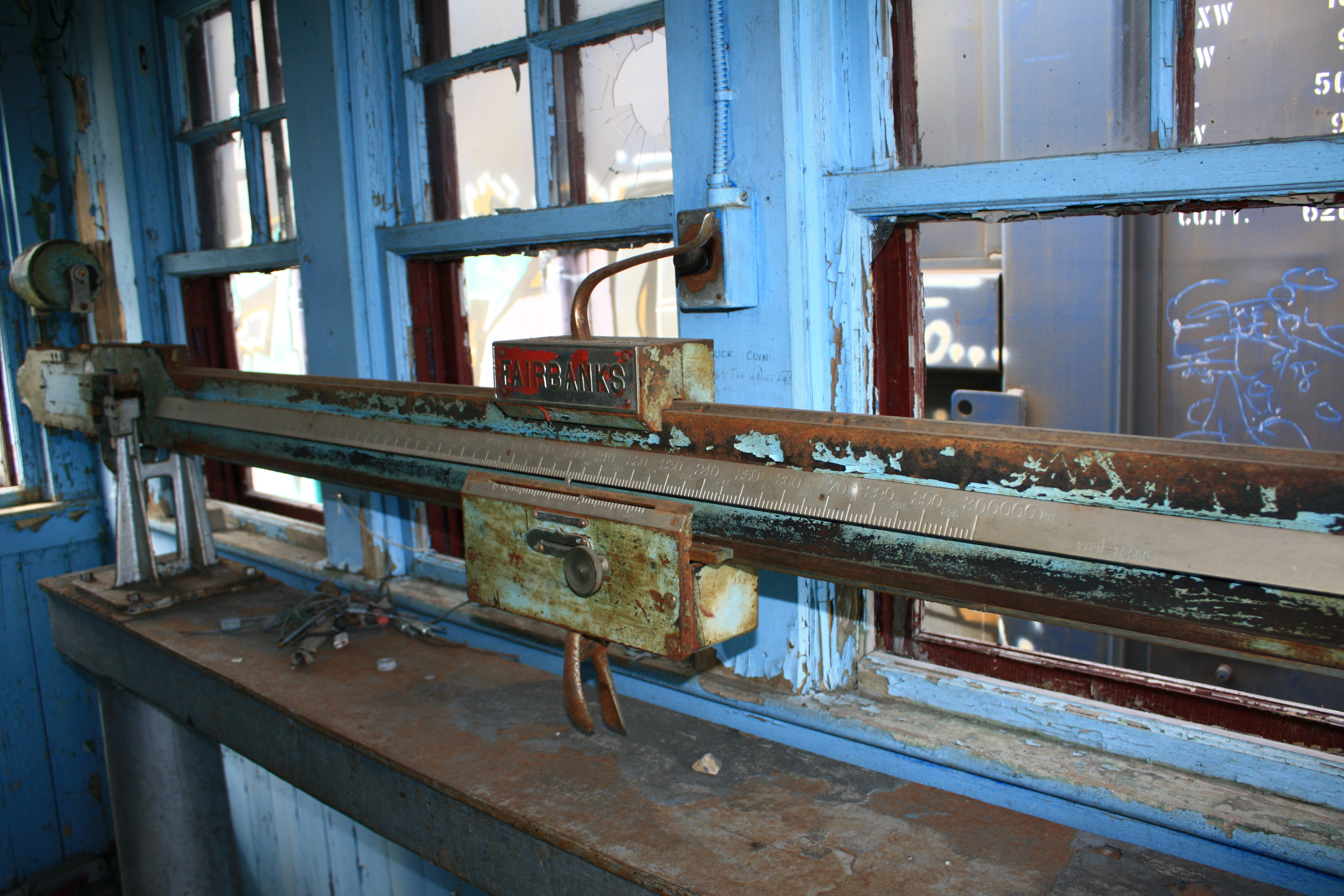
Fairbanks track scale

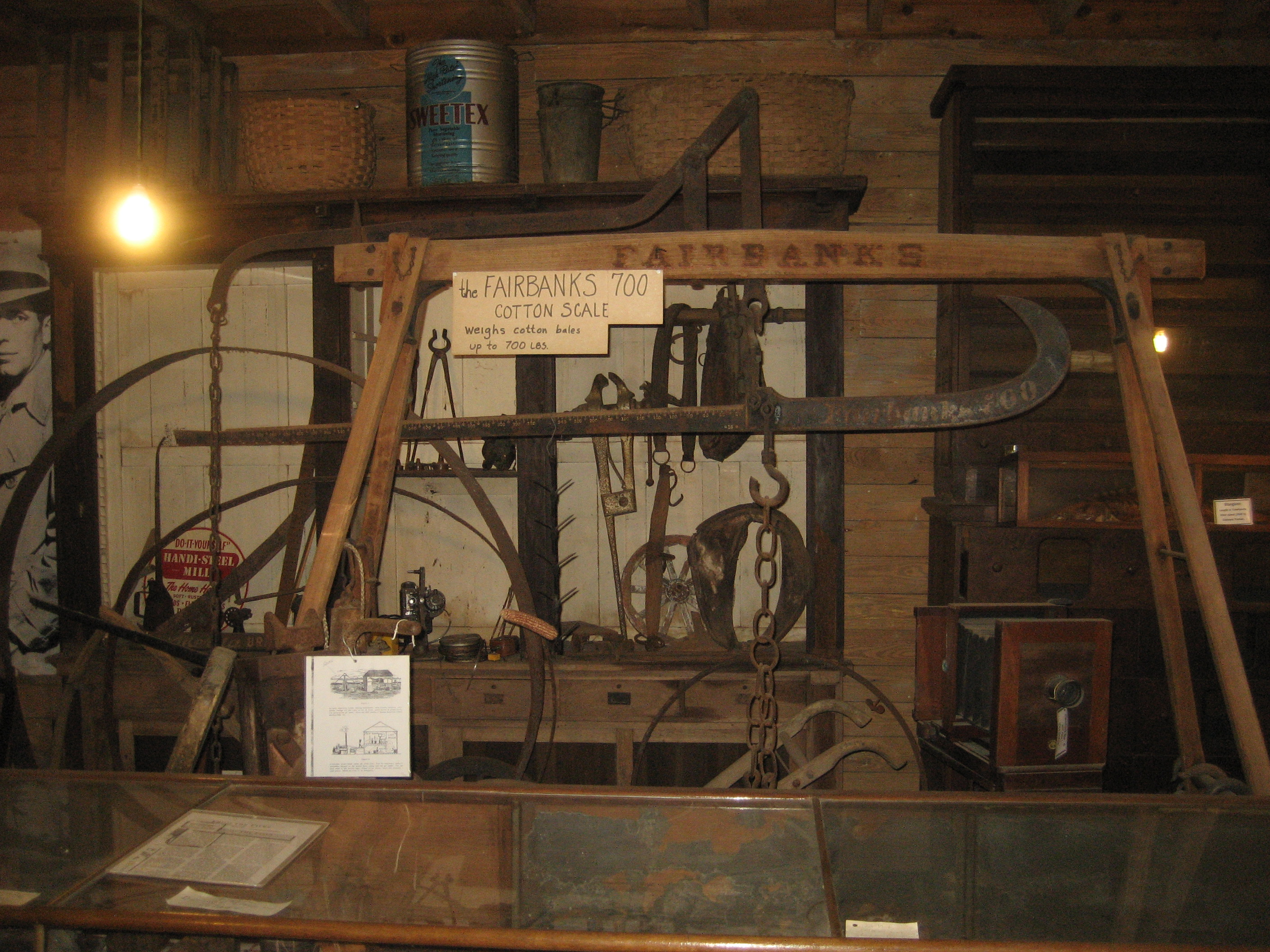
Fairbanks Cotton Scale

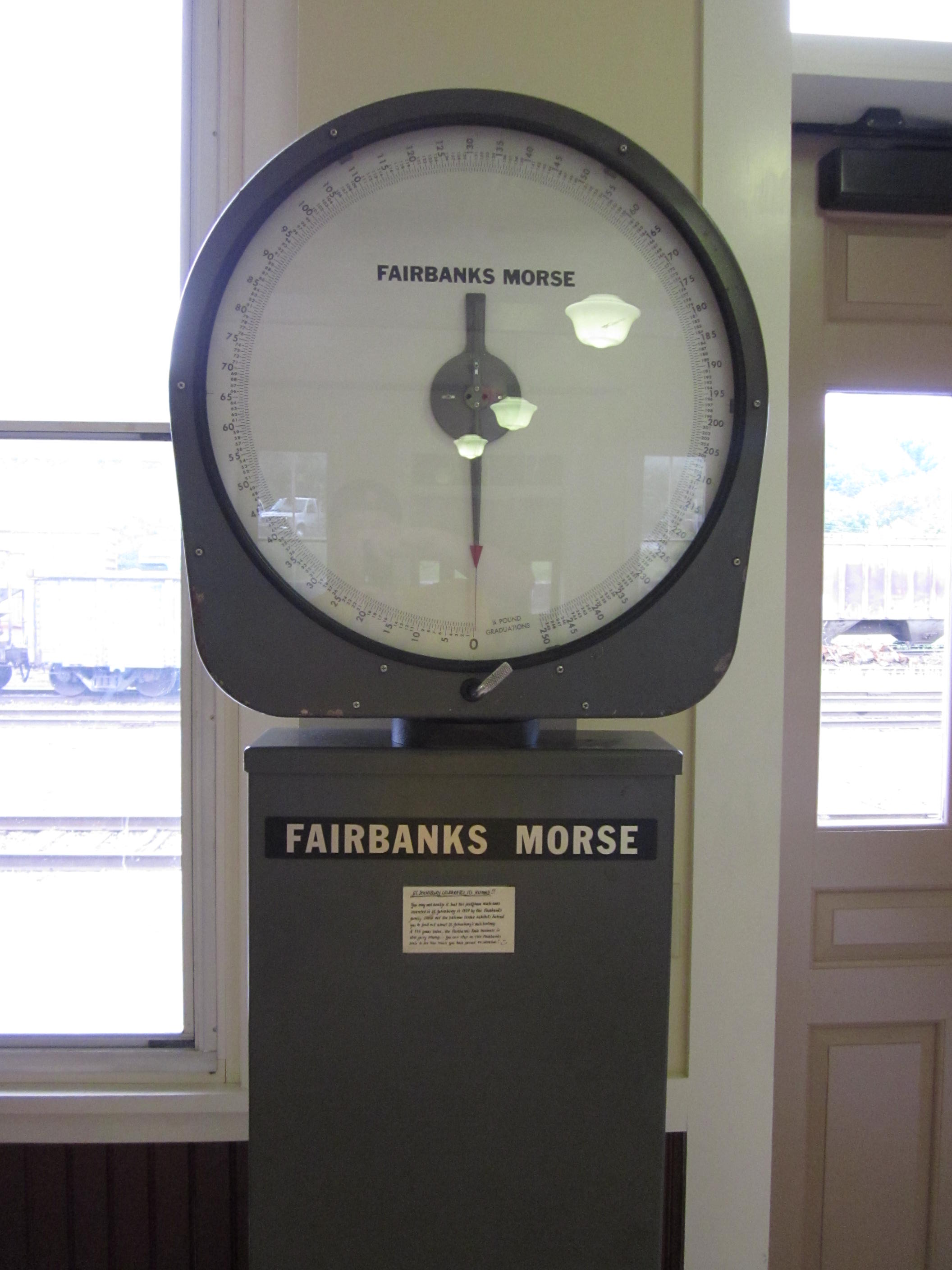
Fairbanks-Morse scale

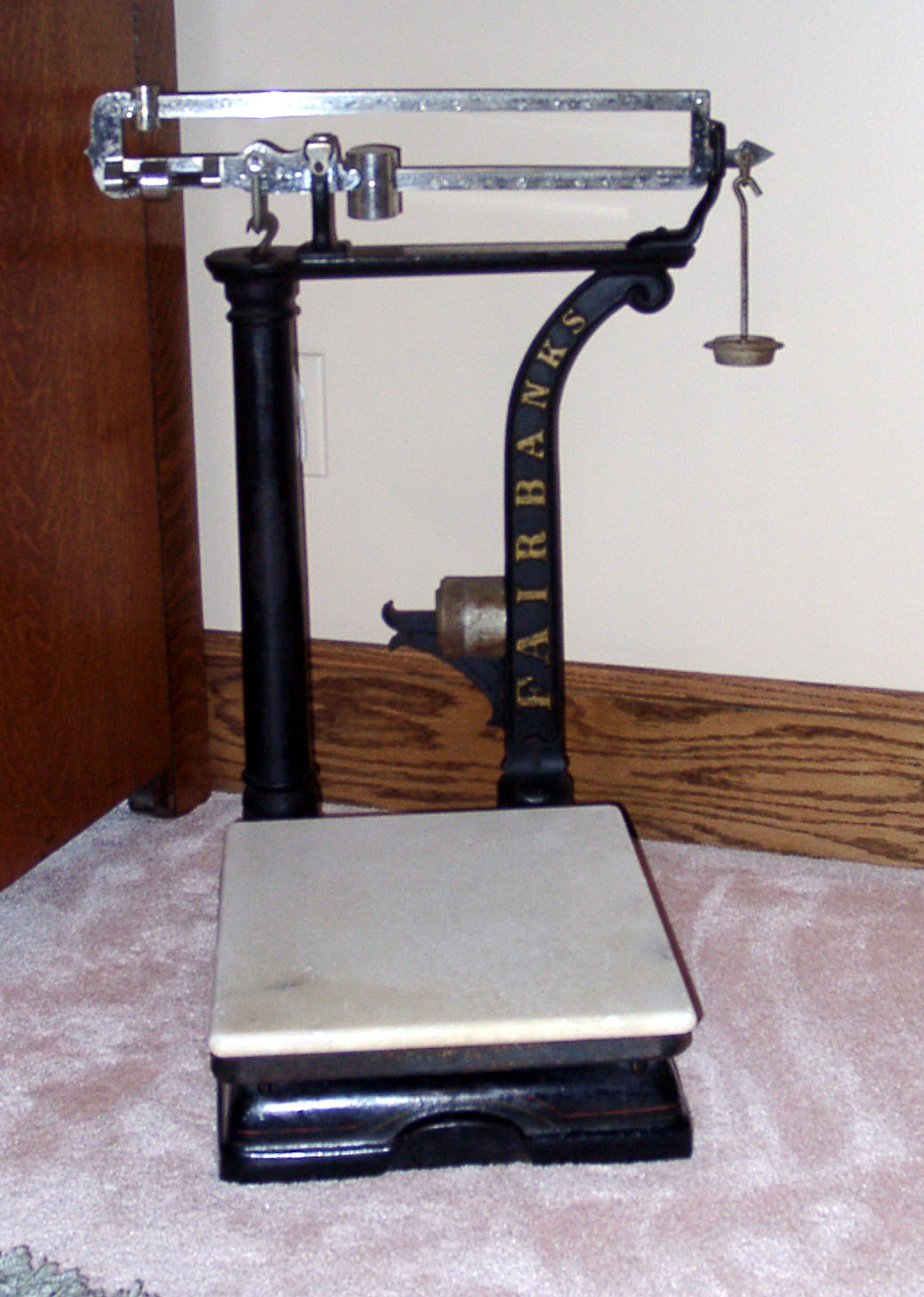
Fairbanks butcher's scale

== Sources ==
- Chisholm, Hugh, ed. (1911). "Fairbanks, Erastus" . Encyclopædia Britannica. Vol. 10 (11th ed.). Cambridge University Press. p. 130; see middle para. "His brother, Thaddeus Fairbanks (1796–1886), inventor, was born..."
- Duffy, John J. (2003). The Vermont Encyclopedia. University Press of New England. ISBN 1-58465-086-9.
- Fairbanks, Edward (1914). The Town of St. Johnsbury, Vt.
- Ingham, John N. (1983). Biography Dictionary Business Leaders of American. Greenwood Press. ISBN 9780313239076.
- Moody, John (1923). Moody's Analyses of Investments. Moody's Investors Services. OCLC 930258712.
- Ullery, Jacob G. (1894). Men of Vermont. Transcript Publishing Company. OCLC 1048796062.
