= 1865 Vermont gubernatorial election =

- September 5, 1865
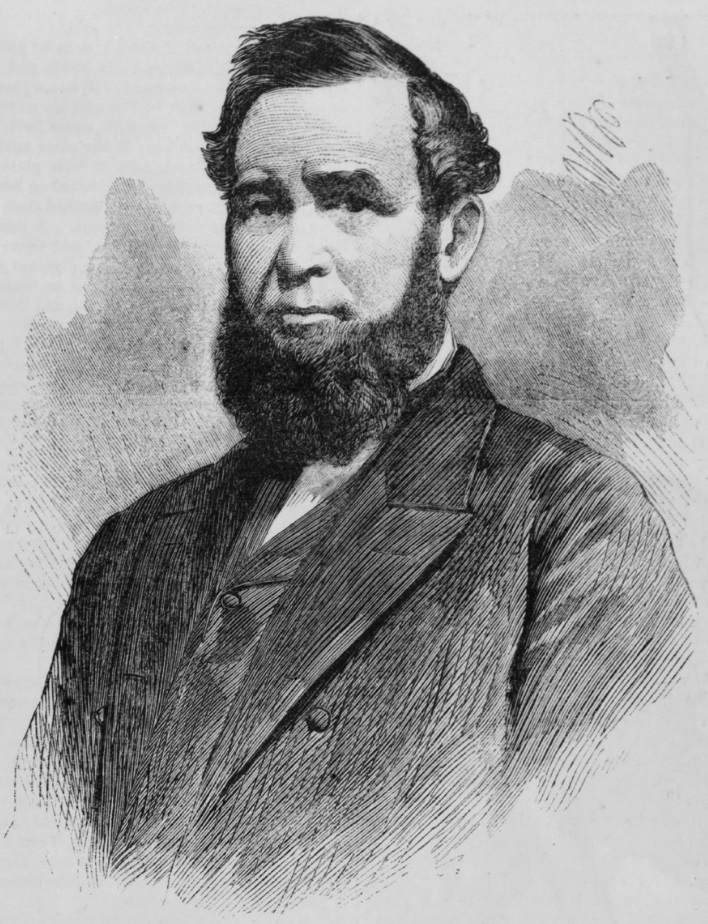

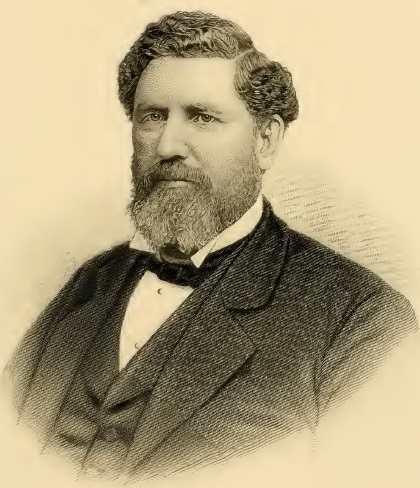
| Candidate | Paul Dillingham | Charles N. Davenport |
| Party | Republican | Democratic |
| Popular vote | 27,586 | 8,857 |
| Percentage | 75.67% | 24.29% |
- County results Dillingham: 50–60% 60–70% 70–80% 80–90% >90%
Governor before election
J. Gregory Smith
Republican
Elected Governor
Paul Dillingham
Republican

The 1865 Vermont gubernatorial election took place on September 5, 1865. In keeping with the "Mountain Rule", incumbent Republican J. Gregory Smith, who had served two one-year terms, was not a candidate for reelection as governor of Vermont. With the election taking during the American Civil War, Dillingham ran as a pro-Union Republican. The Democratic nomination was won by Charles N. Davenport of Wilmington, an attorney and founder of the Brattleboro Reformer newspaper. In the general election, Dillingham was easily elected to a one-year term as governor.

== Results ==
1865 Vermont gubernatorial election
| Party | Candidate | Votes | % | ±% |
|---|---|---|---|---|
| Republican | Paul Dillingham | 27,586 | 75.67 | |
| Democratic | Charles N. Davenport | 8,857 | 24.29 | |
| N/A | Scattering | 13 | 0.04 | |
| Total votes | | 36,456 | 100.0 | |
