= Charles Davenport (disambiguation) =

Charles Davenport (1866–1944) was an American eugenicist and biologist.

Charles Davenport may also refer to:

- Charles Davenport (manufacturer) (1812–1903), manufacturer of passenger cars for railroads
- Charles N. Davenport (1830–1882), American attorney, businessman, and politician
- Cow Cow Davenport (Charles Edward Davenport, 1894–955), American boogie-woogie and piano blues player
- Charles Davenport (American football) (born 1968), American football player
- Charlie Davenport, a character in Annie Get Your Gun
