= 1866 Vermont gubernatorial election =

- September 4, 1866
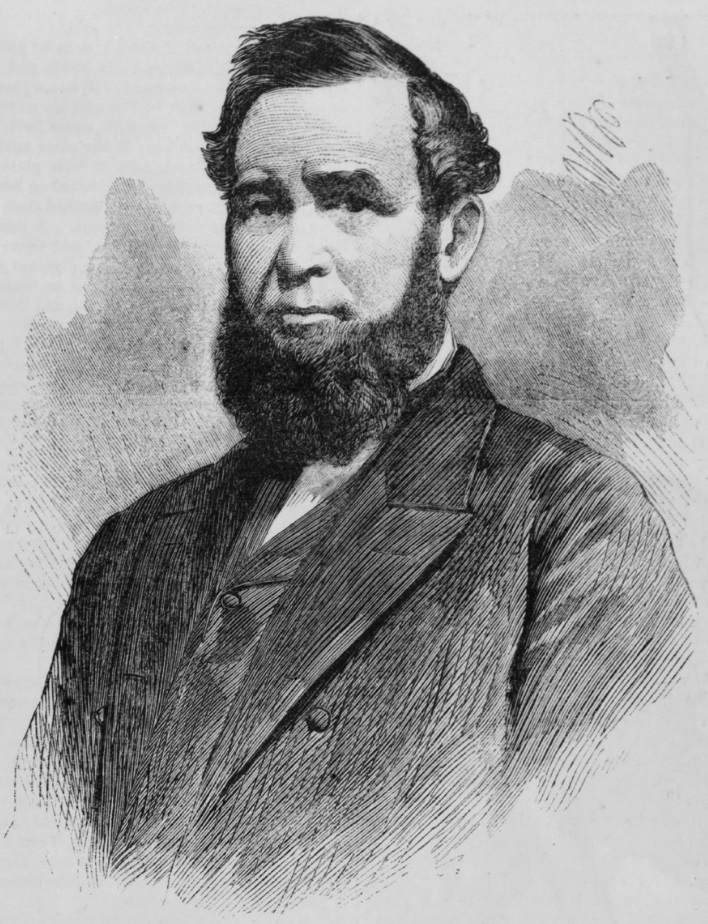

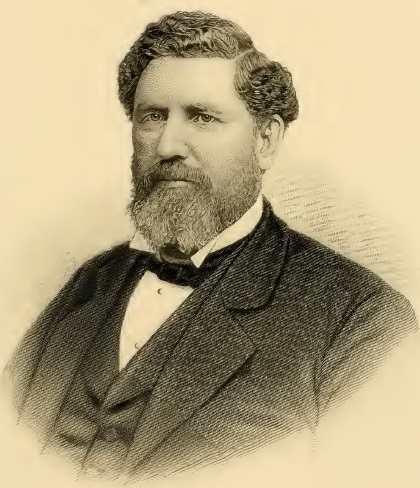
Candidate	Paul Dillingham	Charles N. Davenport
Party	Republican	Democratic
Popular vote	34,117	11,292
Percentage	75.13%	24.86%
- County results Dillingham: 60–70% 70–80% 80–90% >90%
Governor before election
Paul Dillingham
Republican
Elected Governor
Paul Dillingham
Republican

The 1866 Vermont gubernatorial election took place on September 4, 1866. In keeping with the "Mountain Rule", Incumbent Republican Paul Dillingham was a candidate for a second one-year term as governor of Vermont. With the election taking place soon after the American Civil War, Dillingham ran as a pro-Union Republican. The Democratic nomination was won by Charles N. Davenport of Wilmington, an attorney and founder of the Brattleboro Reformer newspaper, who was also the Democratic nominee in 1865. In the general election, Dillingham was easily elected to a second one-year term as governor.

== Results ==
1866 Vermont gubernatorial election
Party	Candidate	Votes	%	±%
Republican	Paul Dillingham (incumbent)	34,117	75.13	
Democratic	Charles N. Davenport	11,292	24.86	
N/A	Scattering	3	0.01	
Total votes		45,412	100.0	
