= William Brayton =

William Brayton may refer to:

- William Daniel Brayton (1815–1887), U.S. Representative from Rhode Island
- William Brayton (Vermont judge) (1787–1828), Vermont attorney, politician, and judge
