= 1853 Vermont gubernatorial election =

- September 6, 1853
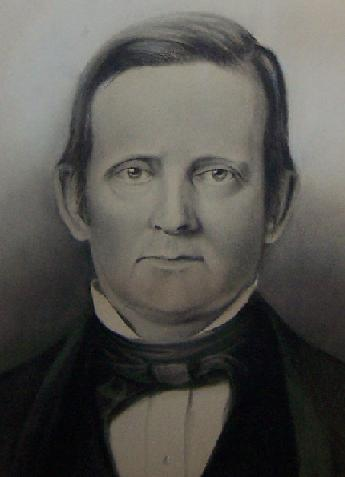

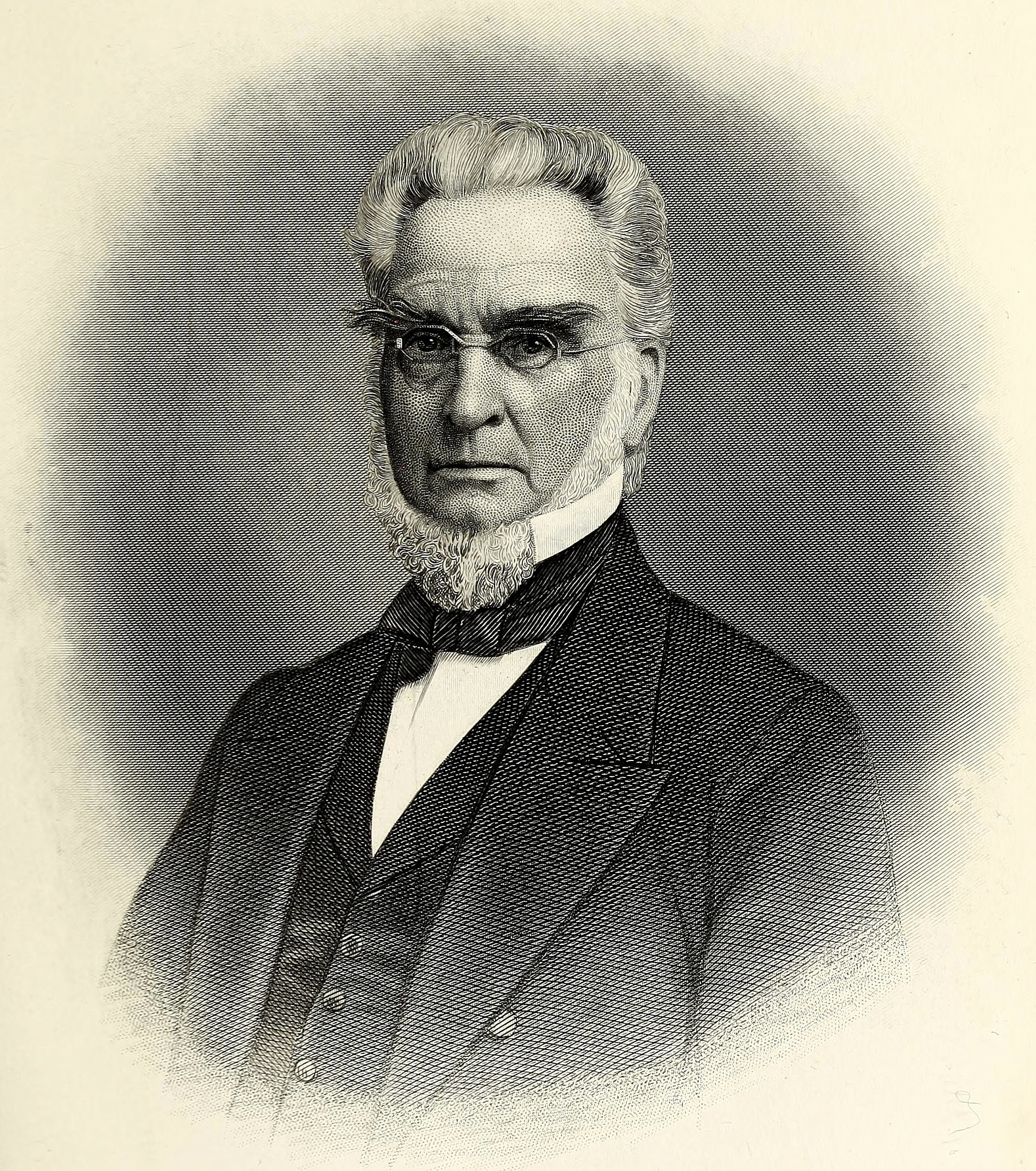

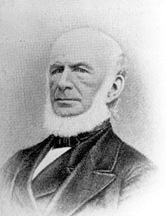
Nominee	John S. Robinson	Erastus Fairbanks	Lawrence Brainerd
Party	Democratic	Whig	Free Soil
Electoral vote	120	104	7
Popular vote	18,142	20,849	8,291
Percentage	38.36%	44.09%	17.53%
- County results Robinson: 40–50% 50–60% Fairbanks: 40–50% 50–60% 60–70% Brainerd: 40–50%
Governor before election
Erastus Fairbanks
Whig
Elected Governor
John S. Robinson
Democratic

The 1853 Vermont gubernatorial election took place on September 6. The same three candidates who ran for governor of Vermont in 1852 ran again in 1853: Whig and incumbent Erastus Fairbanks, Democratic candidate John S. Robinson, and Lawrence Brainerd, the nominee of the Free Soil Party. The results showed that Fairbanks had received 43.9 percent of the vote, with Robinson receiving 38.5 percent, and Brainerd 17.6 percent.

Because no candidate received a majority, the Vermont Constitution required the contest to be settled by the Vermont General Assembly. In the October 27 voting, 119 to 121 votes were necessary for a choice, depending on how many members of the Vermont Senate and Vermont House of Representatives took part in each ballot. On the 20th ballot, with 120 votes required for a choice, enough Brainerd supporters voted for Robinson to give Robinson the win with 120 votes. Fairbanks received 104, and Brainerd received 7. Robinson took the oath of office and began a one-year term on October 28.

Robinson was the only Democrat elected governor of Vermont until the election of Philip H. Hoff in 1962.

== General election ==
=== Results ===
1853 Vermont gubernatorial election
Party	Candidate	Votes	%	±%
Democratic	John Robinson	18,142	38.36	
Whig	Erastus Fairbanks (incumbent)	20,849	44.09	
Free Soil	Lawrence Brainerd	8,291	17.53	
Write-in	Other	9	0.02	
Total votes		47,291	100.0	
