= Governor Dillingham =

Governor Dillingham may refer to:

- Paul Dillingham (1799–1891), 29th Governor of Vermont
- William P. Dillingham (1843–1923), 42nd Governor of Vermont
