= John S. Robinson (Vermont politician) =

American lawyer and politician (1804–1860)

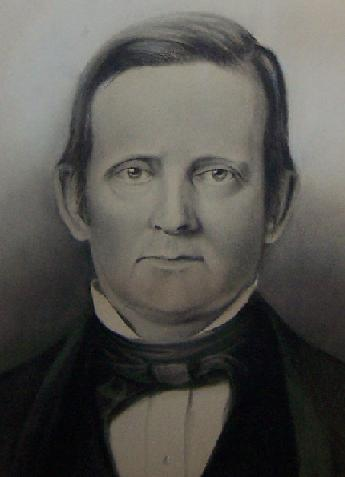

22nd Governor of Vermont
- In office October 1, 1853 – October 13, 1854
- Lieutenant: Jefferson P. Kidder
- Preceded by: Erastus Fairbanks
- Succeeded by: Stephen Royce

Member of the Vermont Senate
- In office 1838–1840 Serving with Nathan Burton (1838); William Hoyt (1839)
- Preceded by: Nathan Burton, Heman Swift
- Succeeded by: Noadiah Swift, Ahiman Louis Miner
- Constituency: Bennington County

Member of the Vermont House of Representatives
- In office 1832–1833
- Preceded by: Jedediah Dewey
- Succeeded by: John Robinson
- Constituency: Bennington

Personal details
- Born: November 10, 1804 Bennington, Vermont, U.S.
- Died: April 25, 1860 (aged 55) Charleston, South Carolina, U.S.
- Resting place: Old Bennington Cemetery, Bennington, Vermont, U.S.
- Party: Democratic
- Spouse: Juliette Staniford Robinson
- Relatives: Moses Robinson (grandfather); Jonathan Robinson (great-uncle); Samuel Robinson (great-uncle)
- Education: Williams College
- Profession: Attorney

John Staniford Robinson (November 10, 1804 – April 25, 1860) was an American lawyer and politician. He is most notable for his service as the 22nd governor of Vermont, from 1853 to 1854.

== Biography ==
Robinson was born in Bennington, Vermont, the son of Nathan Robinson and Jerusha Staniford. Governor and United States Senator Moses Robinson was his grandfather, and Senator Jonathan Robinson and Vermont House Speaker Samuel Robinson were his great-uncles. He graduated in 1824 from Williams College, studied law and passed the bar in 1827. In October, 1847 he married Mrs. Juliette Staniford Robinson, widow of William Robinson. They had no children.

== Career ==
Robinson opened his own law office in Bennington and continued to practice until his death. He served in local offices including justice of the peace, and was a member of the Vermont House of Representatives from 1832 to 1833 and the Vermont Senate from 1838 to 1840. Robinson's political aspirations were thwarted by the fracturing of the Democratic Party over slavery. After 1848, the Vermont Democratic Party split between the regular Democrats and the anti-slavery Democrats, who joined with anti-slavery Whigs and Liberty men to form the Free Soil Party. Robinson was the regular Democratic candidate for governor in 1851, when he finished third behind the Whig and Free Soil candidates. In 1852 he was nominated again by the Democrats and finished second; no candidate received a majority of the votes, and the election went to the Vermont General Assembly, who elected Erastus Fairbanks. He placed second in the 1853 election, but again no candidate received a majority. After several unsuccessful ballots during the month of October, the legislature chose Robinson over Fairbanks, after a number of Free Soil legislators who had supported Lawrence Brainerd switched their support to Robinson. Serving from 1853 to 1854, he was the first Democratic Governor of Vermont and remained the only Democrat elected to the governorship for the next 110 years. The Republican winning streak ended when Democrat Philip H. Hoff won the governorship in 1962.

== Death ==
In 1860, while Robinson was serving as chairman of the Vermont delegation to the Democratic National Convention in Charleston, South Carolina, he died from apoplexy (a stroke). He is interred at Old Bennington Cemetery in Bennington, Vermont.

Party political offices
| Preceded by Charles K. Field | Democratic nominee for Lieutenant Governor of Vermont; 1848 | Succeeded by Philip C. Tucker |
| Preceded by John Roberts | Democratic nominee for Governor of Vermont; 1850, 1851, 1852, 1853 | Succeeded by Merritt Clark |
