= Timothy P. Redfield =

American lawyer, politician and judge (1812–1888)

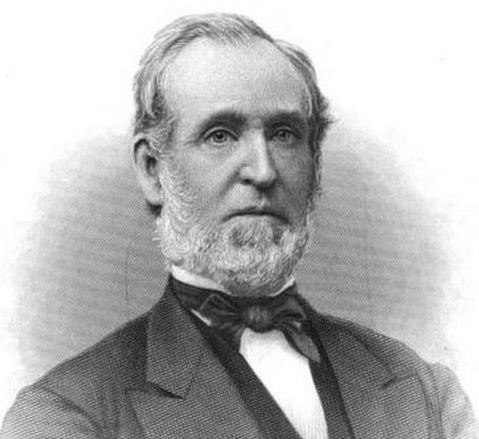
- From 1886's Biography of the Bar of Orleans County, Vermont

Associate Justice of the Vermont Supreme Court
- In office 1870–1884
- Preceded by: Benjamin H. Steele
- Succeeded by: William H. Walker

Member of the Vermont Senate from Orleans County
- In office 1848–1850
- Preceded by: Enoch B. Simonds
- Succeeded by: Henry M. Bates

Member of the Vermont House of Representatives from Irasburg
- In office 1839–1841
- Preceded by: Sabin Killam
- Succeeded by: Charles W. Prentiss

Personal details
- Born: November 3, 1812 Coventry, Vermont
- Died: March 27, 1888 (aged 75) Chicago, Illinois
- Resting place: Green Mount Cemetery, Montpelier, Vermont
- Party: Democratic
- Other political affiliations: Free Soil (1851)
- Spouse: Helen W. Grannis (m. 1840-1888, his death)
- Relations: Isaac F. Redfield (brother); Redfield Proctor (cousin)
- Children: 4
- Education: Dartmouth College
- Profession: Attorney

Timothy Parker Redfield (November 3, 1812 — March 27, 1888) was an American lawyer, politician, and judge. He was most notable for his service as a member of the Vermont Supreme Court from 1870 to 1884.

== Early life ==
Timothy Redfield was born in Coventry, Vermont on November 3, 1812, the fifth child of Dr. Peleg Redfield and Hannah Parker, a merchant's daughter. In 1806 the family had moved to Coventry in the frontier region of northern Vermont. His father served as town clerk for many years and also represented Coventry in the state legislature from 1812 to 1820. Timothy graduated from Dartmouth College in 1836 with honors, being elected a member of Phi Beta Kappa. He immediately started to study law in the office of his brother Isaac F. Redfield, who was elected that year to the Vermont Supreme Court.

== Career ==
In 1838 he was admitted to the bar, and from 1838 to 1848 practiced law in Irasburg, the county seat of Orleans County. He represented Irasburg in the Vermont House of Representatives in 1839 and Orleans County in the Vermont Senate in 1848. Redfield was the unsuccessful Free Soil party candidate for governor in 1851 and the Democratic party candidate in 1863 and 1864. He served on the Vermont State Board of Education from 1860 to 1862. From 1870 to 1884 he served on the Vermont Supreme Court. William H. Walker was named to succeed him, and in 1884 he was the Democratic candidate for U.S. Senate, losing to Justin Smith Morrill.

A portrait of Judge Redfield hangs in the Washington County Courthouse in Montpelier.

Redfield also served on the boards of directors or as an officer of some Vermont organizations. He was one of the founding directors of the National Life Insurance Company in 1848 and served on its board for forty years. He served the Vermont Mutual Fire Insurance Company (now the Vermont Mutual Insurance Group) as director and as vice-president. He was a trustee of Norwich University from 1853 to 1873.

Redfield died in Chicago, Illinois on March 27, 1888. He was buried at Green Mount Cemetery in Montpelier.

== Family ==
Timothy Redfield married Helen W. Grannis in 1840; they had four children; twin boys who died in infancy in 1853, Frederick (1842-1865), who only lived to be 22, and daughter Alice Melinda (1848-1935), who married a musician named Anthony Phillips. Timothy Redfield died in Chicago where Phillips was employed.

Timothy Redfield's older brother Isaac (1804-1876) served on the Vermont Supreme Court from 1836 to 1859 and as Chief Judge from 1852 to 1859; he was also a respected legal scholar, writing works on railroad law and other subjects. The governor, senator, and Secretary of War Redfield Proctor (1831-1908) was a much younger first cousin of Timothy Redfield, the youngest son of his mother's sister.

Party political offices
Preceded by Lucius Benedict Peck	Free Soil nominee for Governor of Vermont; 1851	Succeeded by Lawrence Brainerd
Preceded by Benjamin H. Smalley	Democratic nominee for Governor of Vermont; 1863, 1864	Succeeded by Charles N. Davenport
