= Thomas Bartlett Jr. =

American lawyer and politician (1808–1876)

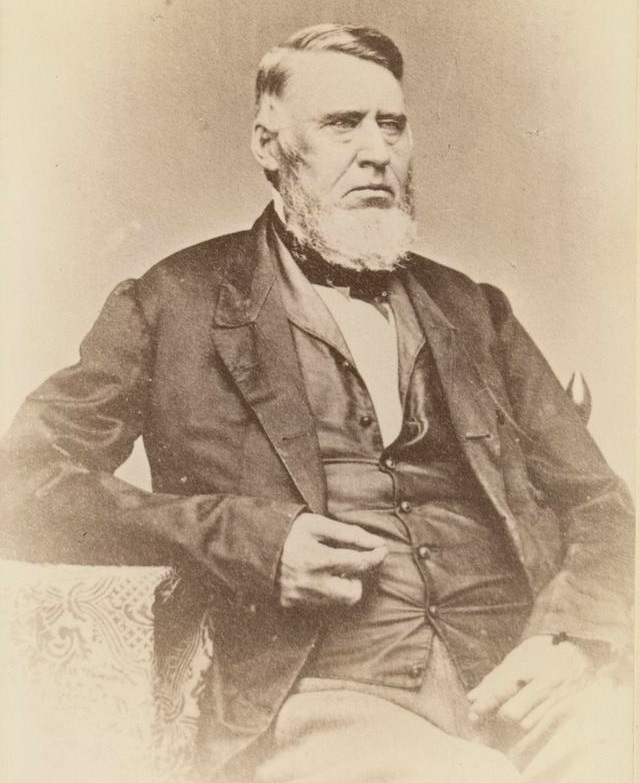

Member of the United States House of Representatives from Vermont's 4th district
- In office March 4, 1851 – March 3, 1853
- Preceded by: Lucius Benedict Peck
- Succeeded by: None (district eliminated)

Member of the Vermont Senate
- In office 1841–1843 Serving with Daniel W. Aiken
- Preceded by: Walter Harvey, Elias Bemiss Jr.
- Succeeded by: George C. Cahoon, John Phillips
- Constituency: Caledonia County

Member of the Vermont House of Representatives
- In office 1854–1856
- Preceded by: Epaphras B. Chase
- Succeeded by: Daniel L. Ray
- In office 1850–1851
- Preceded by: Stephen McGaffey
- Succeeded by: John D. Miller
- Constituency: Lyndon

State's Attorney of Caledonia County, Vermont
- In office 1839–1842
- Preceded by: Charles Davis
- Succeeded by: Theron Howard

Personal details
- Born: June 18, 1808 Sutton, Vermont, US
- Died: September 12, 1876 (aged 68) Lyndon, Vermont, US
- Resting place: Lyndon Town Cemetery, Lyndon, Vermont, US
- Party: Democratic
- Profession: Politician, Lawyer

Thomas Bartlett Jr. (June 18, 1808 – September 12, 1876) was an American lawyer and politician. He served as a U.S. representative from Vermont.

== Biography ==
Bartlett was born in Sutton, Vermont, and attended the common schools. He studied law under Isaac Fletcher at the same time as Thomas J. D. Fuller, and was admitted to the bar in 1833. He began the practice of law in Groton, Vermont. In 1836 he moved to Lyndon, Vermont, where he continued to practice law.

From 1839 until 1842, Bartlett served as the State's attorney for Caledonia County. He was a member of the Vermont State Senate in 1841 and 1842, and served in the Vermont House of Representatives in 1849, 1850, 1854 and 1855. Bartlett was a delegate to the State constitutional conventions in 1850 and 1857, and was President of the Vermont Constitutional Convention in 1850.

Bartlett was elected as a Democrat to the Thirty-second Congress, serving from March 4, 1851, until March 3, 1853. In Congress, he served as chairman of the Committee on Expenditures on Public Buildings. He was an unsuccessful candidate for reelection in 1852. After leaving Congress, Bartlett resumed the practice of law.

In 1851, Bartlett aired his dismay for the current behavior of college students in a letter that appeared in the July 19, 1851, edition of the Caledonian, a newspaper printed at St. Johnsbury, VT. The letter then became a pamphlet entitled "An Epistolary Disquisition on College Morality." His main complaint was what he felt was the loose language of college students. He had sent the letter to the editor outlining his complaints and the pamphlet, written just before his induction to the 32nd Congress, was written to justify his earlier criticisms. A pamphlet mocking Bartlett for his criticisms of "the shockingly profane and obscene" language he complains of was circulated in late 1851 with Barlett's letter printed intact and a mocking rebuke of the letter and its author following.

== Death ==
Bartlett died on September 12, 1876, in Lyndon, Vermont. He is interred in Lyndon Town Cemetery in Lyndon.

U.S. House of Representatives
| Preceded by Lucius B. Peck | Member of the U.S. House of Representatives from Vermont's 4th congressional district 1851–1853 | Succeeded by District eliminated |
