= Augustus Young (politician) =

American politician

Member of the United States House of Representatives from Vermont's 4th district
- In office March 4, 1841 – March 3, 1843
- Preceded by: John Smith
- Succeeded by: Paul Dillingham

Assistant Judge of Franklin County, Vermont
- In office 1851–1855 Serving with Alvah Sabin (1851), Preston Taylor (1852), John C. Bryant (1854)
- Preceded by: William C. Wilson
- Succeeded by: Valentine S. Ferris

Member of the Vermont Senate
- In office 1836–1840
- Preceded by: None (position created)
- Succeeded by: Jacob Bates
- Constituency: Orleans County

State's Attorney of Orleans County
- In office 1824–1828
- Preceded by: Joshua Sawyer
- Succeeded by: E. H. Starkweather

Member of the Vermont House of Representatives
- In office 1832–1833
- Preceded by: Royal Corbin
- Succeeded by: Joseph Scott Jr.
- In office 1828–1831
- Preceded by: Hiram Mason
- Succeeded by: Royal Corbin
- In office 1826–1827
- Preceded by: Joseph Scott
- Succeeded by: Hiram Mason
- In office 1821–1825
- Preceded by: Hiram Mason
- Succeeded by: Joseph Scott
- Constituency: Craftsbury

Probate Judge of Orleans County, Vermont
- In office 1830–1831
- Preceded by: John Kimball
- Succeeded by: John Kimball

Personal details
- Born: March 20, 1784 Arlington, Vermont Republic
- Died: June 17, 1857 (aged 73) St. Albans, Vermont, U.S.
- Party: Whig
- Profession: Politician, Lawyer, Judge

Augustus Young (March 20, 1784 – June 17, 1857) was an American politician. He served as a United States representative from Vermont, a member of the Vermont House of Representatives, state’s attorney for Orleans County, a judge of probate, a county assistant judge, and a member of the Vermont State Senate.

== Early life ==
Young was born in Arlington in the Vermont Republic on March 20, 1784. He completed preparatory studies, studied law with Isaac Warner of Cambridge and Bates Turner of St. Albans, and was admitted to the bar in 1810. He began the practice of law in Stowe.

== Career ==
Young moved to Craftsbury in 1812. He was a member of the Vermont House of Representatives from 1821 to 1825, 1826 to 1827, 1828 to 1831, and 1832 to 1833. He was state’s attorney for Orleans County, Vermont, from 1824 to 1828; judge of probate in 1830 and 1831; and served in the Vermont State Senate from 1836 to 1840.

Young was elected as a Whig candidate to the 27th United States Congress, serving from March 4, 1841, to March 3, 1843. He declined to be a candidate for renomination, resumed the practice of law, and engaged in literary pursuits.

Young moved to St. Albans, and became assistant judge of the Franklin County Court from 1851 to 1854. In 1856, he was appointed State Naturalist due to his knowledge as a geologist and a mineralogist. He wrote "On the Quadrature of the Circle" and "Unity of Purpose".

== Death ==
Young died in St. Albans on June 17, 1857. He was buried at Greenwood Cemetery in St. Albans.

== Published works ==
- "Preliminary Report on the Natural History of the State of Vermont" by Augustus Young Vermont State Geologist, published by Carruthers Press, July 2008.

U.S. House of Representatives
Preceded by John Smith	Member of the U.S. House of Representatives from Vermont's 4th congressional district 1841–1843	Succeeded by Paul Dillingham
