= Benjamin Swift =

American politician (1781–1847)

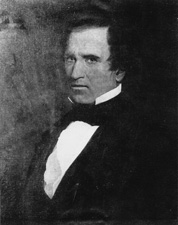

United States Senator from Vermont
- In office March 4, 1833 – March 3, 1839
- Preceded by: Horatio Seymour
- Succeeded by: Samuel S. Phelps

Member of the United States House of Representatives from Vermont's 4th congressional district
- In office March 4, 1827 – March 3, 1831
- Preceded by: Ezra Meech
- Succeeded by: Heman Allen (of Milton)

Member of the Vermont House of Representatives from St. Albans
- In office 1825–1827
- Preceded by: Stephen Royce
- Succeeded by: John Smith

Personal details
- Born: April 3, 1781 Amenia, New York, U.S.
- Died: November 11, 1847 (aged 66) St. Albans, Vermont, U.S.
- Resting place: Greenwood Cemetery; St. Albans, Vermont
- Party: Democratic-Republican; National Republican; Whig
- Spouse: Rebecca Brown Swift
- Children: 9
- Parent(s): Job Swift; Mary Ann (Sedgwick) Swift
- Education: Litchfield Law School
- Profession: Politician; Lawyer; Banker; Farmer

Benjamin Swift (April 9, 1780 – November 11, 1847) was an American lawyer, banker and politician from Vermont. He served as a United States representative and United States senator, and helped found the Whig Party.

== Early life ==
Swift was born in Amenia, New York, the son of Job Swift and Mary Ann (Sedgwick) Swift. In 1786, at the age of five, he moved with his father to Bennington in the Vermont Republic. He attended the common schools in Bennington before attending Litchfield Law School in 1801. He studied law and was admitted to the bar in 1806. He began the practice of law in Bennigton before moving to Manchester to practice law. In 1809 he moved to St. Albans to practice law. He also engaged in banking and farming in the area.

== Political career ==
He held various political positions in Vermont, and was elected to the Vermont State House in 1825. He served in the State House until 1827. He was then elected to serve Vermont as a National Republican Party candidate in the United States House of Representatives. He served in the Twentieth and the Twenty-first Congresses from March 4, 1827, to March 3, 1831. While in Congress, he was on the executive committee of the Congressional Temperance Society. He declined renomination.

In 1833 he was elected as an Anti-Jacksonian candidate to the United States Senate, serving from March 4, 1833, to March 3, 1839. While in the Senate, Swift was a strong opponent of President Andrew Jackson and helped found the Whig Party. Swift was not renominated for a second term in the Senate and returned to St. Albans where he continued to work as a lawyer and farmer until his death. He died on November 11, 1847, in St. Albans, Vermont and is interred in Greenwood Cemetery in St. Albans.

== Family life ==
Swift married Rebecca Brown on October 26, 1809. They were the parents of nine children: Charles Henry, Cordelia, William, Catherine Sedgwick, Alfred Brown, Jane Harriet, George Sedgwick, Caroline, and Charles Benjamin.

U.S. House of Representatives
| Preceded by Ezra Meech | Member of the U.S. House of Representatives from Vermont's 4th congressional district March 4, 1827 – March 3, 1831 (obsolete district) | Succeeded by Heman Allen (of Milton) |
U.S. Senate
| Preceded by Horatio Seymour | U.S. senator (Class 1) from Vermont; March 4, 1833 – March 3, 1839; Served alongside: Samuel Prentiss | Succeeded by Samuel S. Phelps |
