= Heman Allen (Vermont politician) =

American politician (1777–1844)

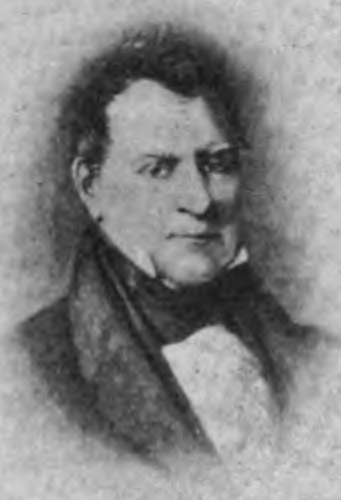
- From Volume II of 1905's Some of the Ancestors and Descendants of Samuel Converse

Member of the United States House of Representatives from Vermont's 4th district
- In office March 4, 1831 – March 3, 1839
- Preceded by: Benjamin Swift
- Succeeded by: John Smith

Member of the Vermont House of Representatives
- In office 1810–1814; 1816-1817; 1822; 1824–1826

Personal details
- Born: June 14, 1777 Ashfield, Massachusetts, U.S.
- Died: December 11, 1844 (aged 67) Burlington, Vermont, U.S.
- Party: Anti-Jacksonian; Whig
- Spouse: Sarah Ann "Sally" Prentis Allen
- Children: 8
- Profession: Politician, Lawyer

Heman Allen (June 14, 1777 – December 11, 1844) was an American lawyer and politician from Milton, Vermont. He served as a U.S. representative.

== Biography ==
Allen was born in Ashfield (now Deerfield, Massachusetts) to Enoch Allen and Mercy Belding Allen. He attended an academy in Chesterfield, New Hampshire for two years before moving to Grand Isle, Vermont.

He read law with Elnathan Keyes of Burlington and Bates Turner of St. Albans. Allen was admitted to the bar in 1803. He began the practice of law in Milton, and was the first resident lawyer in Milton.

Allen served as a member of the Vermont House of Representatives from 1810 to 1814, 1816 to 1817, 1822, and 1824 to 1826. He moved to Burlington in 1828 and continued the practice of law.

He was elected as an Anti-Jacksonian candidate to the Twenty-second, Twenty-third and the Twenty-fourth Congresses March 4, 1831 to March 3, 1837). He was elected as a Whig candidate to the Twenty-fifth Congress, serving from March 4, 1837, until March 3, 1839.

While in Congress, Allen served as chairman of the Committee on Expenditures in the Department of the Treasury during the Twenty-third through Twenty-fifth Congresses. He was an unsuccessful candidate for reelection in 1838 to the Twenty-sixth Congress. After leaving Congress, Allen resumed the practice of law. He was a director of the Lake Champlain Steamboat Company.

== Personal life ==
Allen married Sarah Ann "Sally" Prentis Allen on December 4, 1804. They had eight children; Heman Jr., Lucius, George, Sarah, Charles Prentis, Joseph William, Julia, and James Heman.

Allen was the distant cousin of Heman Allen (of Colchester), United States Representative from Colchester, Vermont and America's first United States Minister Plenipotentiary to Chile. To distinguish between them, he was often referred to as Heman Allen (of Milton).

== Death ==
Allen died in Burlington on December 11, 1844, and is interred at the Elmwood Avenue Cemetery in Burlington.

U.S. House of Representatives
| Preceded by Benjamin Swift | Member of the U.S. House of Representatives from Vermont's 4th congressional district 4 March 1831–3 March 1839 | Succeeded by John Smith |
