= Vermont's 4th congressional district =

- Obsolete district
- Created: 1803; 1821; 1825
- Eliminated: 1810; 1820; 1930
- Years active: 1803–1813; 1821–1823; 1825–1853

Vermont's 4th congressional district is an obsolete district. It was created in 1803. It was eliminated after the 1850 census. Its last congressman was Thomas Bartlett, Jr.

== List of members representing the district ==
Member	Party	Years ↑	Cong ress	Electoral history
District established March 4, 1803
Martin Chittenden (Williston)	Federalist	March 4, 1803 – March 3, 1813	8th 9th 10th 11th 12th	Elected on the third ballot in 1803. Re-elected in 1804. Re-elected in 1806. Re-elected in 1808. Re-elected in 1810. Retired to run for Governor of Vermont.
District inactive		March 4, 1813 – March 3, 1821	13th 14th 15th 16th	Vermont elected its representatives statewide at-large.
Elias Keyes (Stockbridge)	Democratic-Republican	March 4, 1821 – March 3, 1823	17th	Elected in 1820. Redistricted to the at-large district and lost re-election.
District inactive		March 4, 1823 – March 3, 1825	18th	Vermont elected its representatives statewide at-large.
Ezra Meech (Shelburn)	Jacksonian	March 4, 1825 – March 3, 1827	19th	Elected in 1824. Lost re-election.
Benjamin Swift (St. Albans)	Anti-Jacksonian	March 4, 1827 – March 3, 1831	20th 21st	Elected in 1827 on the third ballot. Re-elected in 1828. Retired.
Heman Allen (of Milton) (Burlington)	Anti-Jacksonian	March 4, 1831 – March 3, 1837	22nd 23rd 24th 25th	Elected late in 1832. Re-elected in 1833. Re-elected in 1834. Re-elected in 1836. Lost re-election.
Heman Allen (of Milton) (Burlington)	Whig	March 4, 1837 – March 3, 1839	22nd 23rd 24th 25th	Elected late in 1832. Re-elected in 1833. Re-elected in 1834. Re-elected in 1836. Lost re-election.
John Smith (St. Albans)	Democratic	March 4, 1839 – March 3, 1841	26th	Elected in 1838. Lost re-election.
Augustus Young (Johnson)	Whig	March 4, 1841 – March 3, 1843	27th	Elected in 1840. Retired.
Paul Dillingham Jr. (Waterbury)	Democratic	March 4, 1843 – March 3, 1847	28th 29th	Elected in 1843. Re-elected in 1844. Retired.
Lucius B. Peck (Montpelier)	Democratic	March 4, 1847 – March 3, 1851	30th 31st	Elected in 1846. Re-elected in 1848. Retired to run for Governor of Vermont.
Thomas Bartlett Jr. (Lyndon)	Democratic	March 4, 1851 – March 3, 1853	32nd	Elected in 1850. Redistricted to the 2nd district and lost re-election.
District dissolved March 4, 1853
