= Lawrence Brainerd =

American businessman, abolitionist and politician (1794–1870)

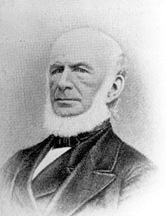

United States Senator from Vermont
- In office October 14, 1854 – March 3, 1855
- Preceded by: Samuel S. Phelps
- Succeeded by: Jacob Collamer

Member of the Republican National Committee from Vermont
- In office 1856–1864
- Preceded by: None (position created)
- Succeeded by: Abraham B. Gardner

Chairman of the Vermont Republican Party
- In office 1856–1857
- Preceded by: None (position created)
- Succeeded by: Henry G. Root

Member of the Vermont House of Representatives from St. Albans
- In office 1834–1835
- Preceded by: John Smith
- Succeeded by: John Smith

Personal details
- Born: March 16, 1794 East Hartford, Connecticut, U.S.
- Died: May 9, 1870 (aged 76) St. Albans, Vermont, U.S.
- Resting place: Greenwood Cemetery, St. Albans, Vermont
- Party: Republican
- Other political affiliations: Jacksonian; Whig; Liberty; Free Soil
- Spouse: Fidelia B. Gadcomb (m. 1819–1852, her death)
- Relations: Joseph Hungerford Brainerd (cousin); J. Gregory Smith (son in law); F. Stewart Stranahan (son in law)
- Children: 12 (including Ann Eliza Smith)
- Profession: Businessman

Military service
- Allegiance: United States
- Branch/service: Vermont Militia
- Years of service: 1812–
- Rank: Captain
- Unit: Dixon's Regiment; 1st Artillery Company, 1st Regiment, 3rd Brigade
- Battles/wars: War of 1812

Lawrence Brainerd (March 16, 1794 – May 9, 1870) was an American businessman, abolitionist and United States Senator from Vermont. A longtime anti-slavery activist, after leaving the Jacksonians in the 1830s, Brainerd was active in the Whig, Liberty, and Free Soil parties, and was one of the organizers of the Republican Party when it was formed as the main anti-slavery party in the mid-1850s. Brainerd's longtime commitment to the cause of abolition was recognized in 1854, when opponents of slavery in the Vermont General Assembly chose him to fill a five-month vacancy in the United States Senate.

A native of East Hartford, Connecticut, Brainerd was raised by an uncle from the age of nine, and grew up in Troy, New York and St. Albans, Vermont. He taught school and worked as a store clerk, then began a business career of his own while still a teenager. He operated a successful store, then expanded his holdings to include a successful farm, as well as interests in banking, railroads, railroad construction, and steamships on Lake Champlain. Brainerd had extensive real estate holdings in and around St. Albans, including farms where he raised horses. In 1856, he was chosen to serve as president of the Vermont Agricultural Society. Brainerd became involved in the Congregational church at a young age and was a prominent advocate of temperance.

Brainerd became active in politics first as a Jacksonian, and he represented St. Albans in the Vermont House of Representatives from 1834 to 1835. An opponent of slavery, Brainerd joined the Whigs, but became dissatisfied with the party's attempts to chart a middle ground on the issue, and became an adherent of the abolitionist Liberty Party, and later the Free Soil Party. Brainerd was the unsuccessful Liberty Party candidate for governor of Vermont in 1846, 1847, 1848, 1852, and 1854, but his candidacies served to increase awareness of the abolitionist position on slavery. In October 1854, Brainerd's years of advocacy in the cause of anti-slavery were recognized when anti-slavery Whigs, Liberty Party members, and Free Soil Party members in the Vermont General Assembly combined to elect Brainerd to fill a short term vacancy in the United States Senate. He served until March 1855, and was succeeded by Jacob Collamer.

In 1855, Brainerd was one of the organizers of the new Republican Party when it was created as the main anti-slavery political organization. He served as the first chairman of Vermont's Republican Party, and was one of the handful of state chairmen who issued the call for the party's first national convention in 1856. Brainerd was a delegate, and called the convention to order as its temporary chairman.

Brainerd died in St. Albans on May 9, 1870. He was buried at Greenwood Cemetery in St. Albans.

== Early life ==
Brainerd was born in East Hartford, Connecticut on March 16, 1794, the fifth of thirteen children born to Ezra Brainerd and Mabel (Porter) Brainerd. In 1803, Brainerd went to Troy, New York to reside with his uncle, Joseph S. Brainerd. In 1808, they moved to St. Albans, Vermont. Brainerd was educated in Troy and St. Albans, and attended St. Albans Academy. He taught school for two years, then began a business career as a clerk in a St. Albans store. During the War of 1812, Brainerd served as a sergeant in Colonel Luther Dixon's Regiment of Vermont Militia. During the war, the area around St. Albans and Swanton was contested, with smugglers vying to move goods to the Canadian side of the border and militia patrols attempting to interdict their activities. In addition, British and Canadian forces raided northern Vermont several times during the war, and American soldiers and Vermont militia conducted raids on the Canadian side of the border. Brainerd continued his militia membership after the war and received a commission as a first lieutenant in 1st Artillery Company, 1st Regiment, 3rd Brigade. His membership in Vermont's militia continued for several years, and he was promoted to captain during his service.

In 1816, Brainerd went into business as the owner of a store, and his venture proved successful. His early efforts to expand his holdings included the purchase of 1,200 acres of swampland near Lake Champlain, which he drained, improved, and developed into a successful sheep farm. Brainerd continued to take part in successful business enterprises, frequently in partnership with John Smith and Smith's son J. Gregory Smith, including construction and operation of several railroads in Vermont and Canada that were combined to form the Central Vermont Railway. In addition, he was involved in ownership and operation of several banks, and became active in the transport of cargo on Lake Champlain as the owner and operator of several steamboats and steamships. Brainerd owned real estate throughout St. Albans, including farms where he raised horses. Because he was opposed to slavery, Brainerd used his home and other properties as hiding places for runaway slaves attempting to escape to Canada on the Underground Railroad.

In 1839, a large, aggressive gray wolf attacked flocks and herds throughout Franklin County and became a cause for concern among farmers and townspeople. Brainerd, whose size, strength, and skills as an outdoorsman were the subject of local renown, successfully hunted the wolf. A monument commemorating his deed was later placed on Aldis Hill in St. Albans, near the spot where Brainerd caught up to and killed the wolf. In 1856, he was elected president of the Vermont Agricultural Society. Brainerd was an active member of the Congregational church and a long time advocate for the temperance movement. In addition, he was a longtime supporter of the American Missionary Association and served a term as its president.

== Political career ==
Brainerd became involved in local politics and government with an appointment as deputy sheriff of Franklin County, Vermont. In 1834 he was elected to the Vermont House of Representatives as a Jacksonian, and he served from 1834 to 1835. Brainerd became increasingly opposed to slavery, and left the Jacksonians for the Whigs. Brainerd's anti-slavery views caused him to leave the Whigs in 1840 out of dissatisfaction with the party's attempts to find a compromise position on the slavery issue. He joined the new Liberty Party, then the Free Soil Party, both of which opposed slavery. Brainerd was the unsuccessful Free Soil candidate for governor of Vermont in 1846, 1847, 1852, 1853, and 1854.

=== United States Senator ===
In September 1854, Brainerd narrowly lost the election for a seat in the Vermont Senate in which he ran as the nominee of the Free Soil Party. In October, he was chosen by the Vermont General Assembly to fill a United States Senate vacancy, which had occurred when Senator William Upham died in January 1853. The Vermont General Assembly failed to choose a successor after Upham's death, so in December 1853 the governor appointed former Senator Samuel S. Phelps to fill the vacancy. Phelps served until the U.S. Senate resolved in March 1854 that he was not entitled to his seat, reasoning that while the governor could make an appointment while the state legislature was not in session, it fell to the legislature to make a selection if it was in session. When the new legislative session began in October 1854, anti-slavery members of the legislature honored Brainerd's years of commitment to their cause by choosing him to succeed Phelps. Brainerd was not a candidate for election to a full term, and served from October 14, 1854, to March 3, 1855. Brainerd took part in one session of Congress from December 1854 to March 1855, and was a member of the Committee on Claims. He was succeeded by Jacob Collamer and returned to his banking and business interests.

== Later life ==
In 1855, Brainerd was one of the organizers of the new Republican Party, which was founded as the country's main anti-slavery political organization. He served as the first chairman of the Vermont Republican Party, and was one of five state party chairmen who issued the call for the first Republican National Convention in 1856. Brainerd was a delegate, and as the temporary chairman he called the convention to order for its first session. Brainerd was subsequently chosen to serve as one of the convention's vice chairmen, and was appointed as a member of the Republican National Committee. Brainerd was chosen as one of Vermont's presidential electors after the 1856 election. When Vermont's electors met in December to cast their ballots, Brainerd was chosen as their chairman. They all voted for the Republican ticket of John C. Frémont for president and William L. Dayton for vice president, who carried Vermont but lost the election.

Brainerd was the chairman of Vermont's delegation to the 1860 Republican National Convention. On the first ballot, Vermont's delegates supported Jacob Collamer as a favorite son. Afterwards, Brainerd and the Vermont delegation supported Abraham Lincoln, who received the nomination on the third ballot. In 1864, Brainerd was succeeded on the Republican National Committee by Abraham B. Gardner.

== Death and burial ==
Brainerd remained active in his business ventures until his death in St. Albans on May 9, 1870. He was buried at Greenwood Cemetery in St. Albans.

== Family ==
In 1819, Brainerd married Fidelia B. Gadcomb. She was the stepdaughter of Asa Aldis and granddaughter of Daniel Owen. The Brainerds were the parents of 12 children:

- Ann Eliza (1819–1905)
- Laura Aldis (1821–1821)
- Lawrence H. (1822–1904)
- Aldis Owen (1824–1906)
- Fidelia Gadcomb (1825–1827)
- Frederic Porter (1827–1828)
- William Gadcomb (1829–1830)
- Erastus Porter (1830–1907)
- Edward Gadcomb (1833–1835)
- Charles Herbert (1835–1837)
- Herbert (1837–1900)
- Miranda Aldis (1841–1909)

Daughter Ann Eliza Brainerd Smith was a noted author and the wife of Vermont Governor J. Gregory Smith. Daughter Miranda became the wife of F. Stewart Stranahan. During the Civil War, Herbert Brainerd served as quartermaster of the 1st Vermont Cavalry Regiment.

Party political offices
First	Free Soil nominee for Governor of Vermont; 1846, 1847	Succeeded by Oscar L. Shafter
Preceded by Timothy P. Redfield	Free Soil nominee for Governor of Vermont; 1852, 1853, 1854	Succeeded by None
U.S. Senate
Preceded by Samuel S. Phelps	U.S. senator (Class 3) from Vermont; October 14, 1854 – March 3, 1855; Served alongside: Solomon Foot	Succeeded by Jacob Collamer
