= George Allen (Vermont clergyman) =

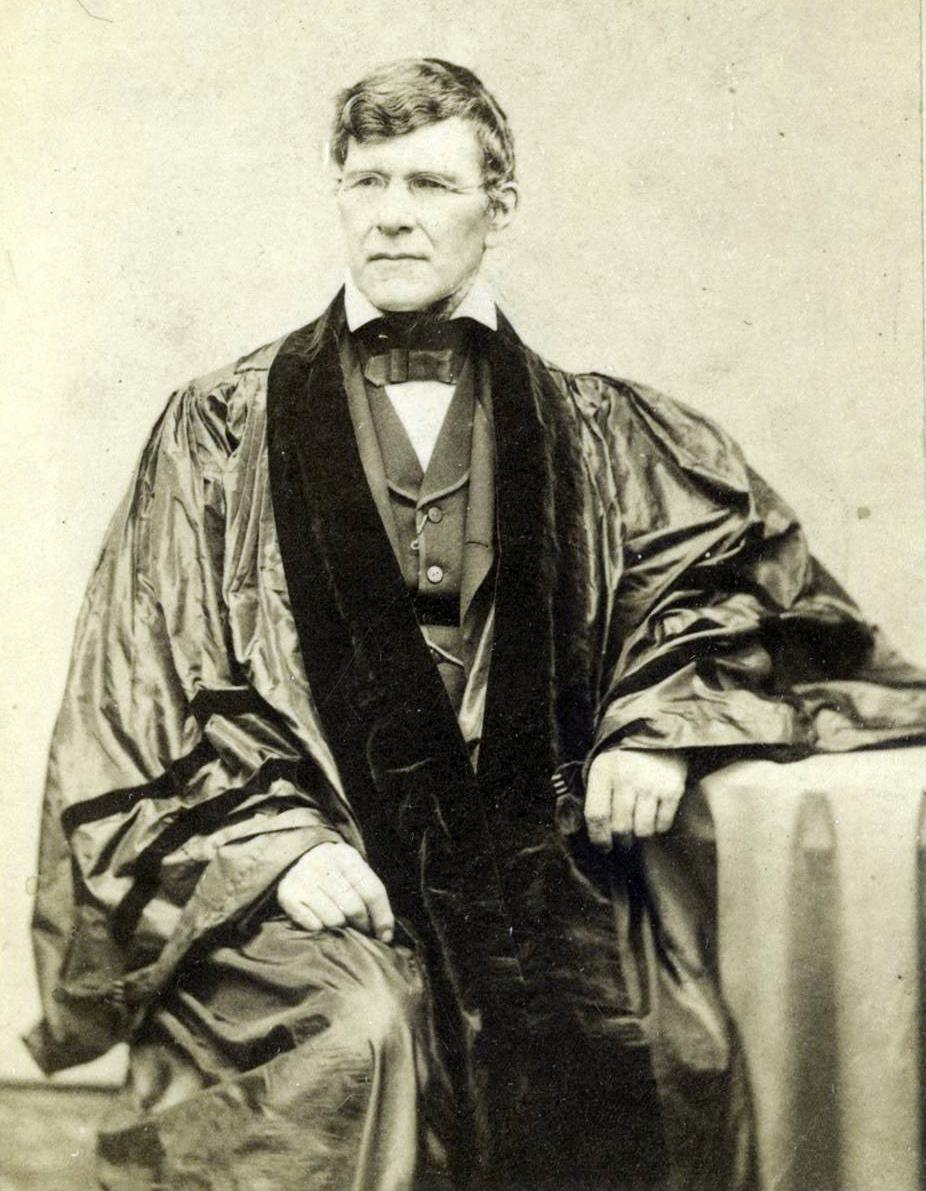
1868 portrait

George Allen (December 17, 1808 – May 28, 1876) was a noted college professor and clergyman.

== Formative years ==
Born in Milton, Vermont in 1808, George Allen was the son of U.S. Congressman Heman Allen (of Milton) and Sarah Ann (Prentiss) Allen.

A graduate of the University of Vermont in 1827, Allen became a professor of languages at that school in 1828. After leaving his position in 1830, he was admitted to the Vermont bar in 1831, and married Mary Hancock Withington, with whom he would have four children.

Ordained as a minister in the Episcopal Church in 1834, Allen became professor of languages at Delaware College in 1837, remaining at that post through 1845 when he became professor of Latin and Greek at the University of Pennsylvania, in Philadelphia. He then published a "Life of Philidor," the chess-player (Philadelphia, 1863).

Allen was elected to the American Philosophical Society in 1856.

== Religion ==
Allen converted to Roman Catholicism in 1847.

== Death and interment ==
Allen died in Worcester, Massachusetts on May 28, 1876, and was interred at Philadelphia's Old Cathedral Cemetery.
