= John Smith (Vermont politician) =

American lawyer, businessman, and politician (1789–1858)

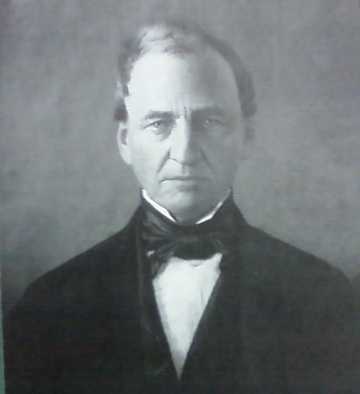

Member of the United States House of Representatives from Vermont's 4th district
- In office March 4, 1839 – March 3, 1841
- Preceded by: Heman Allen (of Milton)
- Succeeded by: Augustus Young

Speaker of the Vermont House of Representatives
- In office 1831–1834
- Preceded by: Robert B. Bates
- Succeeded by: Ebenezer N. Briggs

Member of the Vermont House of Representatives from St. Albans
- In office 1827–1837
- Preceded by: Benjamin Swift
- Succeeded by: Lawrence Brainerd

Personal details
- Born: August 12, 1789 Barre, Massachusetts, U.S.
- Died: August 26, 1858 (aged 69) St. Albans, Vermont, U.S.
- Party: Democratic
- Spouse: Maria W. Curtis Smith
- Children: 7 (including J. Gregory Smith and Worthington Curtis Smith
- Education: University of Vermont
- Profession: Lawyer

John Smith (August 12, 1789 – November 26, 1858) was an American lawyer, businessman, and politician from Vermont. He served as a U.S. representative for one term, prior to which he served as Speaker of the Vermont House of Representatives.

== Biography ==
Smith was born in Barre, Massachusetts to Deacon Samuel Smith and Patience Gregory Smith. His family moved to St. Albans in 1800, and he attended the common schools. Smith later studied law, first with his brother in law Roswell Hutchins, and later with Benjamin Swift. He was admitted to the bar in 1810 and began the practice of law in St. Albans as Swift's partner.

He was State's Attorney for Franklin County from 1826 until 1832. Smith was a member of the Vermont House of Representatives from 1827 until 1837, and served as Speaker from 1831 until 1833.

He was elected as a Democrat to the Twenty-sixth Congress, serving from March 4, 1839, until March 3, 1841. He was an unsuccessful candidate for reelection in 1840 to the Twenty-seventh Congress.

While in Congress, Smith delivered the speech, ""The Defense of the Independent Treasury Idea", which gained national attention and was considered one of the best speeches on this subject. Smith received an honorary Master of Arts degree from the University of Vermont.

After leaving Congress, Smith became involved in railroad enterprises and helped establish the Vermont and Canada Railroad.

== Family ==
John Smith married Maria Waitstill Curtis in 1814. Their children included Harriet Maria, J. Gregory, Edward Curtis, Worthington Curtis, Julia Pierpont, Francis Curtis, and Louisa Ten Broeck.

He was the grandfather of Edward Curtis Smith. In addition, his family was related by marriage to those of Lawrence Brainerd, Amaziah Bailey James and F. Stewart Stranahan.

Smith was also the great-great-grandfather of William Scranton, who served as Governor of and a Congressman from Pennsylvania. The genealogical line runs from John Smith (great-great-grandfather) to Worthington C. Smith (great-grandfather) to Katherine Maria Smith Scranton (grandmother) to Worthington Scranton (father) to William Scranton.

== Death ==
Smith died on November 26, 1858, in St. Albans, Vermont. He in interred at Greenwood Cemetery in St. Albans.

Party political offices
Preceded by Daniel Kellogg	Democratic nominee for Governor of Vermont; 1846	Succeeded by Paul Dillingham
Political offices
Preceded by Robert B. Bates	Speaker of the Vermont House of Representatives; 1831–1834	Succeeded by Ebenezer N. Briggs
U.S. House of Representatives
Preceded by Heman Allen	Member of the U.S. House of Representatives from Vermont's 4th congressional district 4 March 1839–3 March 1841	Succeeded by Augustus Young
