= 1851 Vermont gubernatorial election =

- September 2, 1851
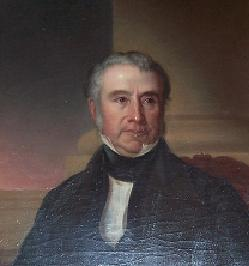

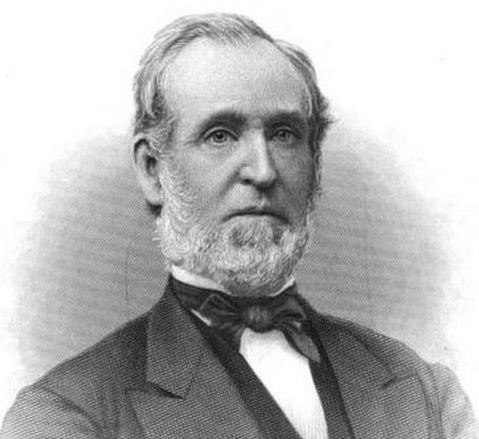

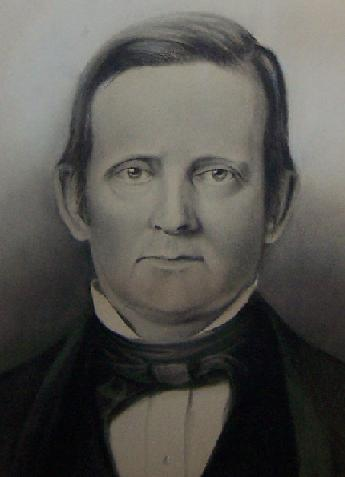
Nominee	Charles K. Williams	Timothy P. Redfield	John S. Robinson
Party	Whig	Free Soil	Democratic
Popular vote	22,676	14,950	6,686
Percentage	51.11%	33.70%	15.07%
County results
Williams:
40–50%
50–60%
60–70%
Redfield:
40–50%
50–60%
Governor before election
Charles K. Williams
Whig
Elected Governor
Charles K. Williams
Whig

The 1851 Vermont gubernatorial election was held on September 2, 1851. The state continued its support for the Whig party, and Whig Governor Charles K. Williams was easily re-elected to a one-year term. The strong showing of the Free Soil Party candidate Timothy P. Redfield also showed that Vermont was on its way to becoming an anti-slavery bastion. The Democratic nominee, John S. Robinson went on to win the governorship in 1853.

== Results ==
1851 Vermont gubernatorial election
Party	Candidate	Votes	%	±%
Whig	Charles K. Williams (incumbent)	22,676	51.11	
Free Soil	Timothy P. Redfield	14,950	33.70	
Democratic	John Robinson	6,686	15.07	
Write-in	Other	51	0.12	
Total votes		44,363	100.0	
