= Robert B. Bates =

American politician (1789–1841)

29th Speaker of the Vermont House of Representatives

Member of the Vermont House of Representatives
- In office 1826–1829
- Preceded by: Daniel Azro Ashley Buck
- Succeeded by: Daniel Azro Ashley Buck

31st Speaker of the Vermont House of Representatives

Member of the Vermont House of Representatives
- In office 1830–1831
- Preceded by: Daniel Azro Ashley Buck
- Succeeded by: John Smith

Personal details
- Born: 1789 Salisbury, Connecticut, U.S.
- Died: October 7, 1841 (aged 51–52) New York, New York, U.S.
- Party: Democratic-Republican
- Profession: Lawyer; Politician

Robert Bull Bates (1789 – October 7, 1841) was an American lawyer and politician in the U.S. state of Vermont. He served as the 29th and 31st Speaker of the Vermont House of Representatives.

== Early life ==
Bates was born in Salisbury, Connecticut in 1789 and was raised in Richmond, Massachusetts. He studied law in Delaware and settled in Middlebury, Vermont in 1813, where he practiced law in partnership with Daniel Chipman. During the War of 1812 Bates was one of two aides de camp for the commander of the Vermont Militia's 3rd Division.

Active in the Episcopal Church, Bates was a delegate to the Vermont diocese's annual convention in 1826.

== Political career ==
A Democratic-Republican, Bates served in several local offices, including Justice of the Peace. He represented Middlebury in the Vermont House of Representatives on several occasions, and was Speaker of the State House from 1826 to 1829 and from 1830 to 1831.

In 1831 Bates was an unsuccessful candidate for the United States House of Representatives, losing to William Slade.

Bates later moved to Albany, New York, and then to New York City where he practiced law until his death on October 7, 1841.

Political offices
Preceded by D. Azro A. Buck	Speaker of the Vermont House of Representatives; 1826–1829	Succeeded by D. Azro A. Buck
Preceded by D. Azro A. Buck	Speaker of the Vermont House of Representatives; 1830–1831	Succeeded by John Smith
