= 1852 Vermont gubernatorial election =

- September 7, 1852
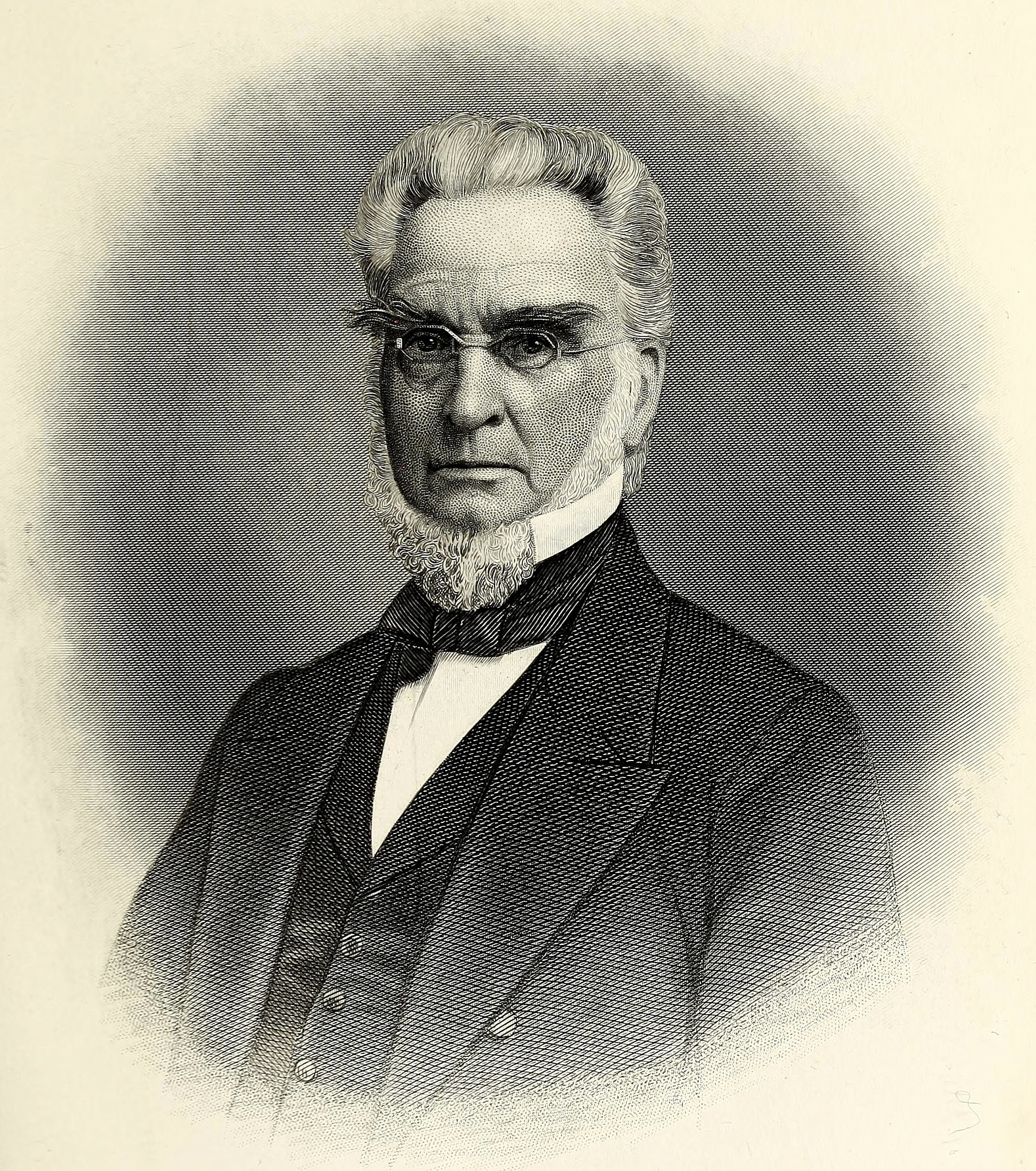

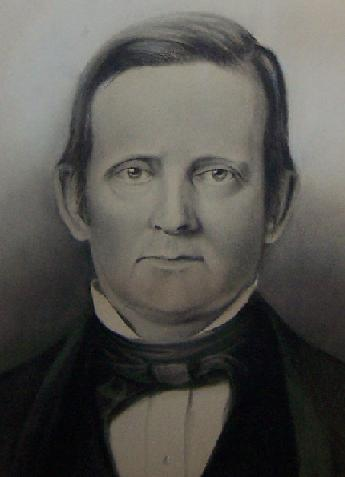

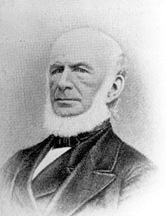
Nominee	Erastus Fairbanks	John S. Robinson	Lawrence Brainerd
Party	Whig	Democratic	Free Soil
Electoral vote	117	61	40
Popular vote	23,795	14,938	9,445
Percentage	49.37%	30.99%	19.60%
- County results Fairbanks: 30–40% 40–50% 50–60% 60–70% Robinson: 40–50% 50–60% Brainerd: 40–50%
Governor before election
Charles K. Williams
Whig
Elected Governor
Erastus Fairbanks
Whig

The 1852 Vermont gubernatorial election was held on Tuesday, September 7. Incumbent governor Charles K. Williams, a Whig, was not a candidate for reelection. In the voting, Whig Erastus Fairbanks received 49.2 percent, Democrat John S. Robinson 31.3 percent, and Free Soil Party nominee Lawrence Brainerd 19.6 percent.

In accordance with the Vermont Constitution, because no candidate received 50 percent of the vote, the election was decided by the Vermont General Assembly. On October 16, with 110 votes by the combined Vermont House of Representatives and Vermont Senate necessary for a choice, Fairbanks won on the first ballot with 117 votes to 61 for Robinson and 40 for Brainerd. On Monday October 18, Fairbanks took the oath of office and began a one-year term.

== General election ==
=== Results ===
1852 Vermont gubernatorial election
Party	Candidate	Votes	%	±%
Whig	Erastus Fairbanks	23,795	49.37	
Democratic	John Robinson	14,938	30.99	
Free Soil	Lawrence Brainerd	9,445	19.60	
Write-in	Other	20	0.04	
Total votes		48,198	100.0	
