= Erastus Fairbanks =

American manufacturer and politician (1792–1864)

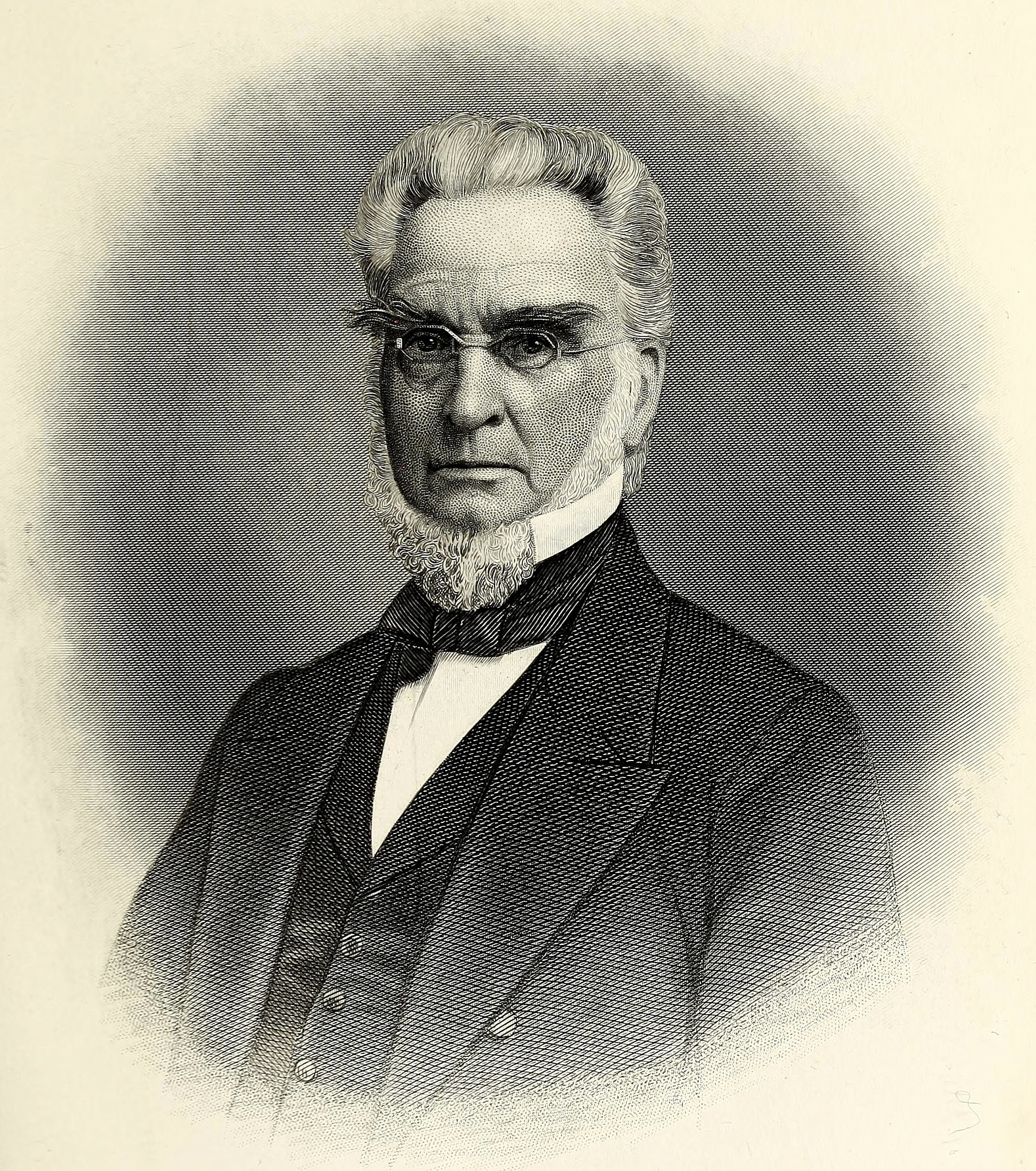

21st & 26th Governor of Vermont
- In office October 12, 1860 – October 11, 1861
- Lieutenant: Levi Underwood
- Preceded by: Hiland Hall
- Succeeded by: Frederick Holbrook
- In office October 1, 1852 – October 1, 1853
- Lieutenant: William C. Kittredge
- Preceded by: Charles K. Williams
- Succeeded by: John S. Robinson

Member of the Vermont House of Representatives from St. Johnsbury
- In office 1836–1840
- Preceded by: David Goss Jr.
- Succeeded by: Lambert Hastings

Personal details
- Born: October 28, 1792 Brimfield, Massachusetts, US
- Died: November 20, 1864 (aged 72) St. Johnsbury, Vermont, US
- Party: Whig (before 1855); Republican (from 1855)
- Spouse: Lois Crossman
- Relations: Thaddeus Fairbanks (brother); Ephraim Paddock (uncle)
- Children: 9, including Horace Fairbanks and Franklin Fairbanks
- Profession: Businessman

Erastus Fairbanks (October 28, 1792 – November 20, 1864) was an American manufacturer, Whig politician, founder of the Republican Party, and the 21st and 26th governor of Vermont. An industrialist and businessman, he was a co-founder of what became the Fairbanks Scales company.

== Early life ==
Fairbanks was born in Brimfield, Massachusetts, to Phebe (Paddock) Fairbanks and Joseph Fairbanks. Ephraim Paddock, the brother of Phebe Paddock, was his uncle. He studied law but abandoned it for mercantile pursuits, and operated a store in Wheelock, Vermont.

== Career ==
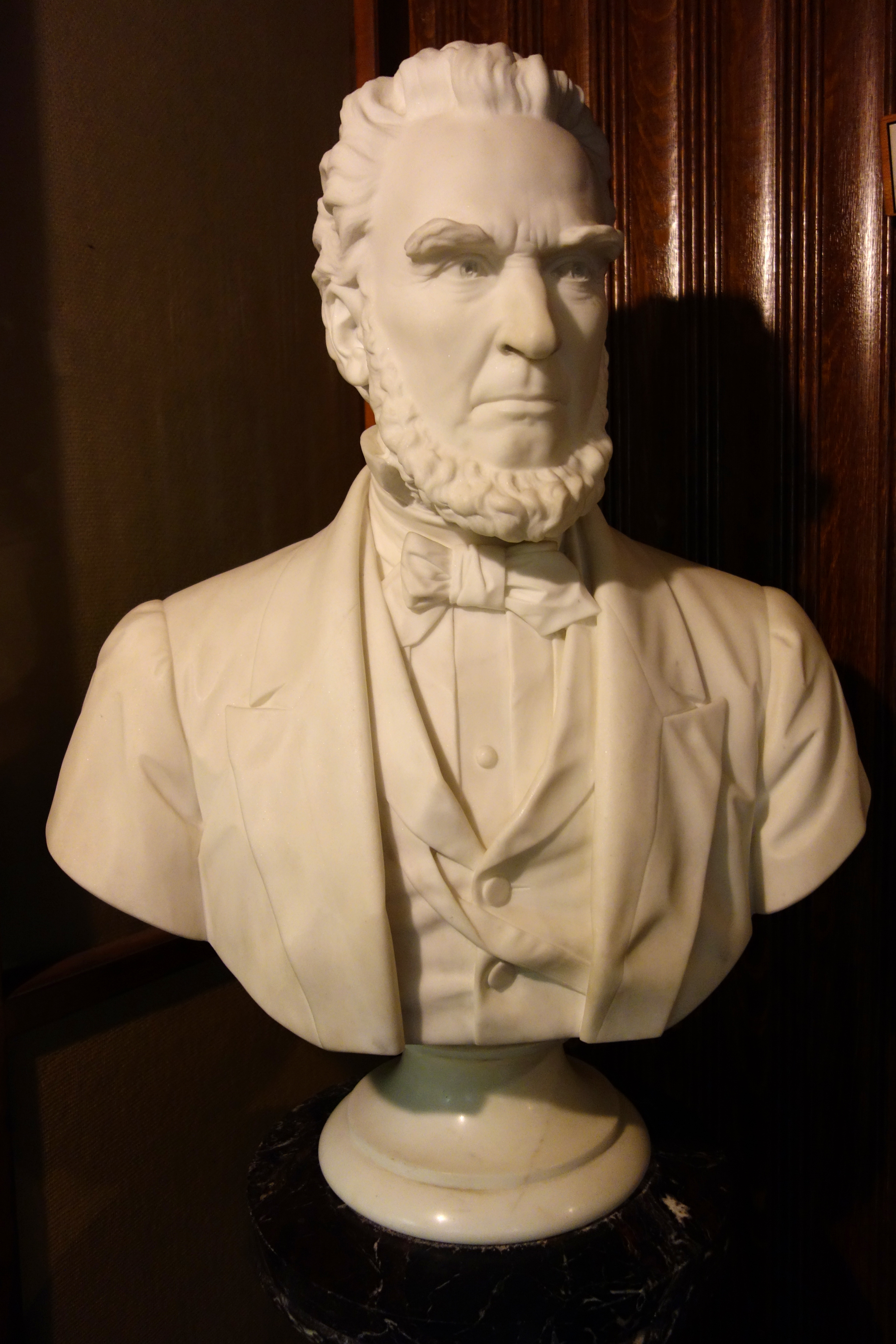
Marble bust of Fairbanks on display at the Fairbanks Museum and Planetarium, St. Johnsbury, Vermont.

Finally settling in St. Johnsbury, Vermont, in 1824, Fairbanks formed a partnership, E. & T. Fairbanks & Co., with his brother Thaddeus for the manufacture of scales, stoves and plows. Thaddeus Fairbanks later invented the first platform scale, which made it possible to calculate the weight of farm products and other goods shipped by wagon and railroad car; the device proved so successful that the renamed Fairbanks Scales company became the largest employer in the state.

The Fairbanks family was involved in numerous charitable and civic endeavors throughout St. Johnsbury and the surrounding towns, including the 1842 founding of St. Johnsbury Academy.

Fairbanks was a member of the Vermont House of Representatives from 1836 to 1840. He was a Whig Presidential Elector for Vermont in 1844 and 1848. He was President of the Passumpsic Railroad, which completed a line from White River Junction to St. Johnsbury in 1850. Though he would ultimately withdraw from the venture due to disputes about labor and planning with the Boston Associates, Fairbanks and his company would be the first to fund the Hadley Falls Dam project in 1846. The project, conceived by one of his salesmen and personal associates, George C. Ewing, ultimately created Holyoke, Massachusetts.

Fairbanks was elected the 21st Governor of Vermont in 1852 and served until 1853. During this term, a law was passed forbidding the sale or traffic of intoxicating beverages. The law was not repealed until 1902.

Fairbanks was one of the founders of the Republican Party, and a delegate from Vermont to the first Republican National Convention in 1856. He was 26th Governor of Vermont from 1860 to 1861. During his second term he rendered valuable aid in the equipment and dispatch of troops in the early days of the American Civil War.

== Personal life ==
Fairbanks was a Congregationalist. He married Lois Crossman (1792–1866) on May 30, 1815. The couple had nine children.

With his brothers Thaddeus and Joseph P., he founded St. Johnsbury Academy. He was the father of Horace Fairbanks and Franklin Fairbanks.

== Death ==
Fairbanks died in St. Johnsbury, Caledonia County, Vermont, on November 20, 1864 (age 72 years, 23 days). He is interred at Mt. Pleasant Cemetery, St. Johnsbury, Vermont.

Party political offices
Preceded by Charles K. Williams	Whig nominee for Governor of Vermont; 1852, 1853	Succeeded by Stephen Royce
Preceded by Hiland Hall	Republican nominee for Governor of Vermont; 1860	Succeeded by Frederick Holbrook
Political offices
Preceded by Charles K. Williams	Governor of Vermont; 1852–1853	Succeeded by John S. Robinson
Preceded by Hiland Hall	Governor of Vermont; 1860–1861	Succeeded by Frederick Holbrook
