= 1863 Vermont gubernatorial election =

- September 1, 1863
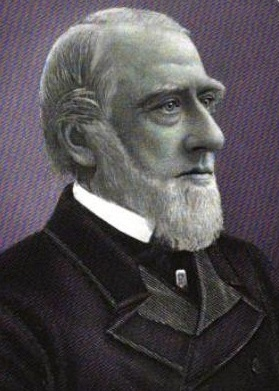

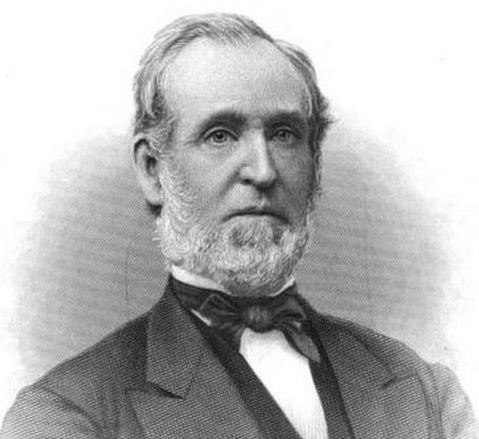
Candidate	J. Gregory Smith	Timothy P. Redfield
Party	Republican	Democratic
Popular vote	29,228	11,917
Percentage	71.02%	28.96%
- County results Smith: 60–70% 70–80% 80–90%
Governor before election
Frederick Holbrook
Republican
Elected Governor
J. Gregory Smith
Republican

The 1863 Vermont gubernatorial election for governor of Vermont took place on September 1. In accordance with the Republican Party's "Mountain Rule", incumbent Frederick Holbrook was not a candidate for reelection. The Republican nominee was J. Gregory Smith, the Speaker of the Vermont House of Representatives. The Democratic nominee was Timothy P. Redfield, a former member of the Vermont Senate and the Free Soil Party's nominee for governor in 1851. In the general election, the Republican Party's dominance of Vermont politics and government continued, and Smith was easily elected to a one-year term.

== Results ==
1863 Vermont gubernatorial election
Party	Candidate	Votes	%	±%
Republican	J. Gregory Smith	29,228	71.02	
Democratic	Timothy P. Redfield	11,917	28.96	
Write-in	Other	10	0.02	
Total votes		41,155	100.0	
