= Lucius Benedict Peck =

American politician

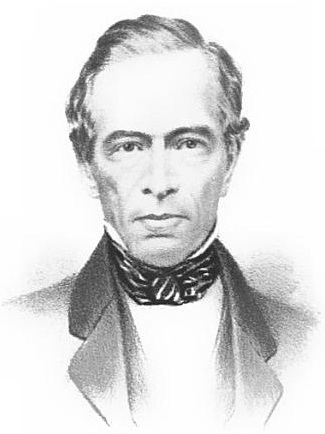

United States Attorney for the District of Vermont
- In office 1853–1857
- President: Franklin Pierce
- Preceded by: Abel Underwood
- Succeeded by: Henry E. Stoughton

Member of the United States House of Representatives from Vermont's 4th district
- In office March 4, 1847 – March 3, 1851
- Preceded by: Paul Dillingham
- Succeeded by: Thomas Bartlett, Jr.

Member of the Vermont House of Representatives
- In office 1838–1839
- Preceded by: William Billings
- Succeeded by: Royal Wheeler

Personal details
- Born: November 17, 1802 Waterbury, Vermont, US
- Died: December 28, 1866 (aged 64) Lowell, Massachusetts, US
- Resting place: Green Mount Cemetery, Montpelier, Vermont
- Party: Democratic
- Spouse: Martha Day Peck
- Children: Mary Peck
- Profession: Politician, Lawyer

Lucius Benedict Peck (November 17, 1802 – December 28, 1866) was an American lawyer and politician. He served as a U.S. representative from Vermont.

== Biography ==
Peck was born in Waterbury, Vermont, to General John Peck and Anna Benedict Peck. He pursued classical studies and attended the United States Military Academy in West Point, New York, for one year, before resigning due to poor health. He studied law with Vermont Supreme Court Justice Samuel Prentiss, and was admitted to the bar in 1825. Peck began the practice of law in Barre. He served as a member of the Vermont House of Representatives in 1838 and 1839. Peck moved to Montpelier, where he continued practicing law.

Peck was elected as a Democrat to the Thirtieth and Thirty-first Congresses, serving from March 4, 1847, until March 3, 1851. During the Thirty-first Congress, he served as chairman of the Committee on Manufactures. Peck did not seek renomination in 1850, and was an unsuccessful candidate for Governor of Vermont. Following the election for governor, Peck resumed the practice of law.

In 1852 Peck was a delegate to the Democratic National Convention. Appointed by President Franklin Pierce, Peck served as the United States Attorney for the District of Vermont from 1853 until 1857. From 1859 until his death in 1866, Peck served as President of the Vermont and Canada Railroad. In 1864, Peck was counsel for the banks robbed in the St. Albans Raid.

== Personal life ==
Peck married Martha Day on May 22, 1832, and they had one daughter named Mary.

== Death ==
Peck died on December 28, 1866, in Lowell, Massachusetts, and is interred in Green Mount Cemetery in Montpelier.

Party political offices
Preceded by Horatio Needham	Free Soil nominee for Governor of Vermont; 1850	Succeeded by Timothy P. Redfield
U.S. House of Representatives
Preceded by Paul Dillingham	Member of the U.S. House of Representatives from Vermont's 4th congressional district 1847–1851	Succeeded by Thomas Bartlett, Jr.
