= 1850 Vermont gubernatorial election =

- September 3, 1850
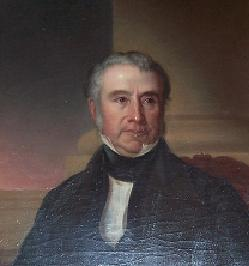

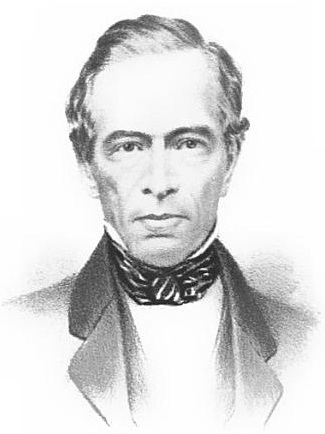

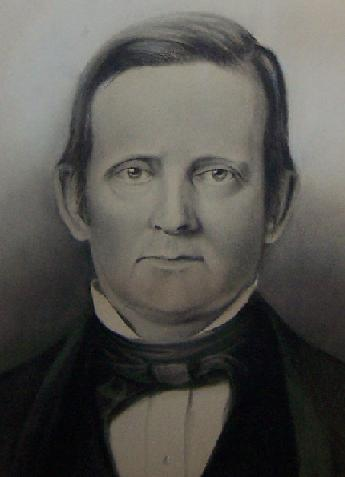
Nominee	Charles K. Williams	Lucius Benedict Peck	John S. Robinson
Party	Whig	Free Soil	Democratic
Popular vote	24,481	18,856	4,142
Percentage	51.53%	39.69%	8.72%
- County results Williams: 40–50% 50–60% 60–70% Peck: 40–50% 50–60% 60–70%
Governor before election
Carlos Coolidge
Whig
Elected Governor
Charles K. Williams
Whig

The 1850 Vermont gubernatorial election took place on September 3, 1850, and resulted in the election of Whig Party candidate Charles K. Williams to a one-year term as governor.

== Results ==
1850 Vermont gubernatorial election
Party	Candidate	Votes	%	±%
Whig	Charles K. Williams	24,481	51.53%	−1.90%
Free Soil	Lucius Benedict Peck	18,856	39.69%	−4.29%
Democratic	John Robinson	4,142	8.72%	+2.37%
Write-in	Other	26	0.06%	
Total votes		'47,505'	'100'	
