= 1860 Vermont gubernatorial election =

- September 4, 1860
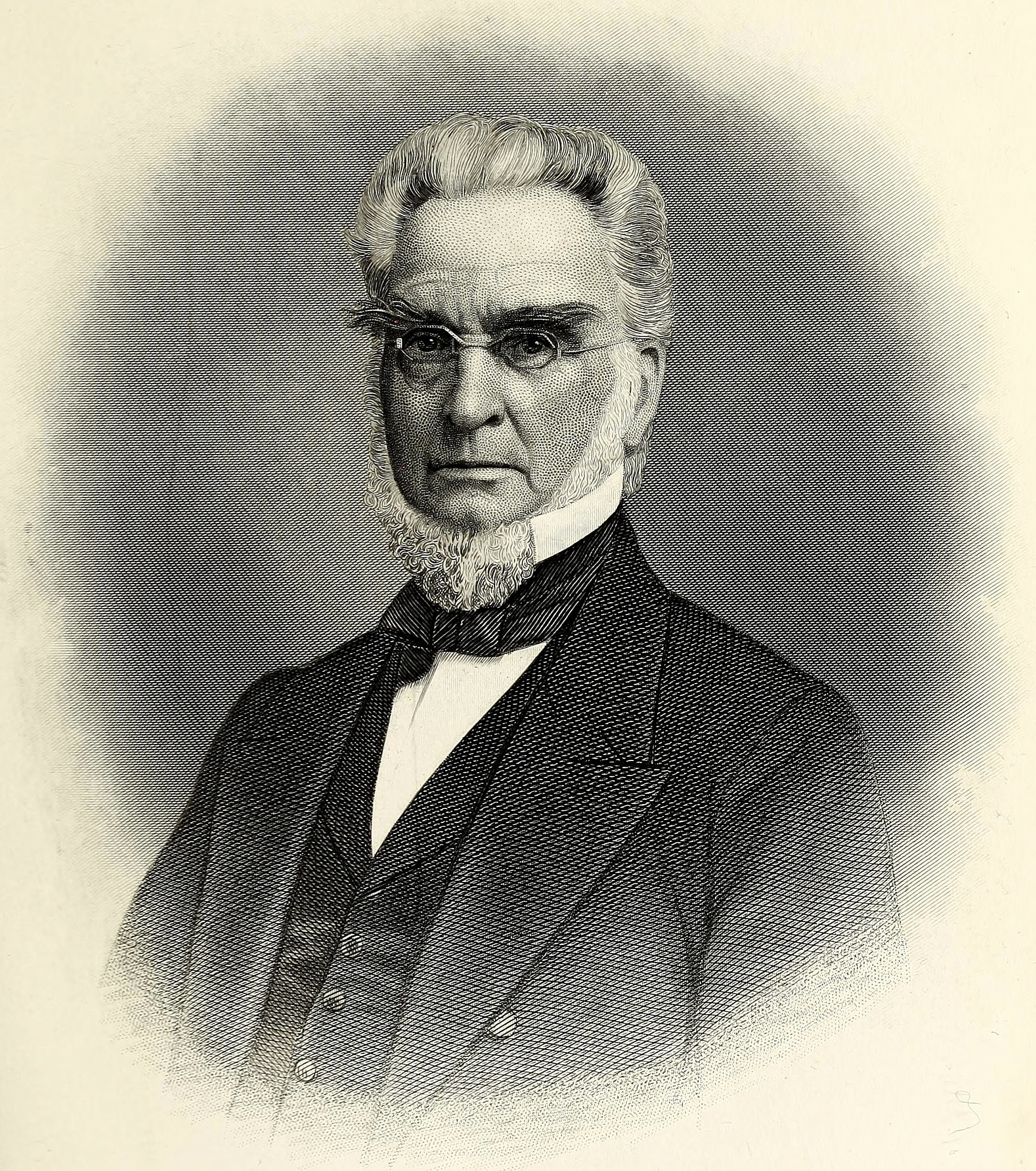

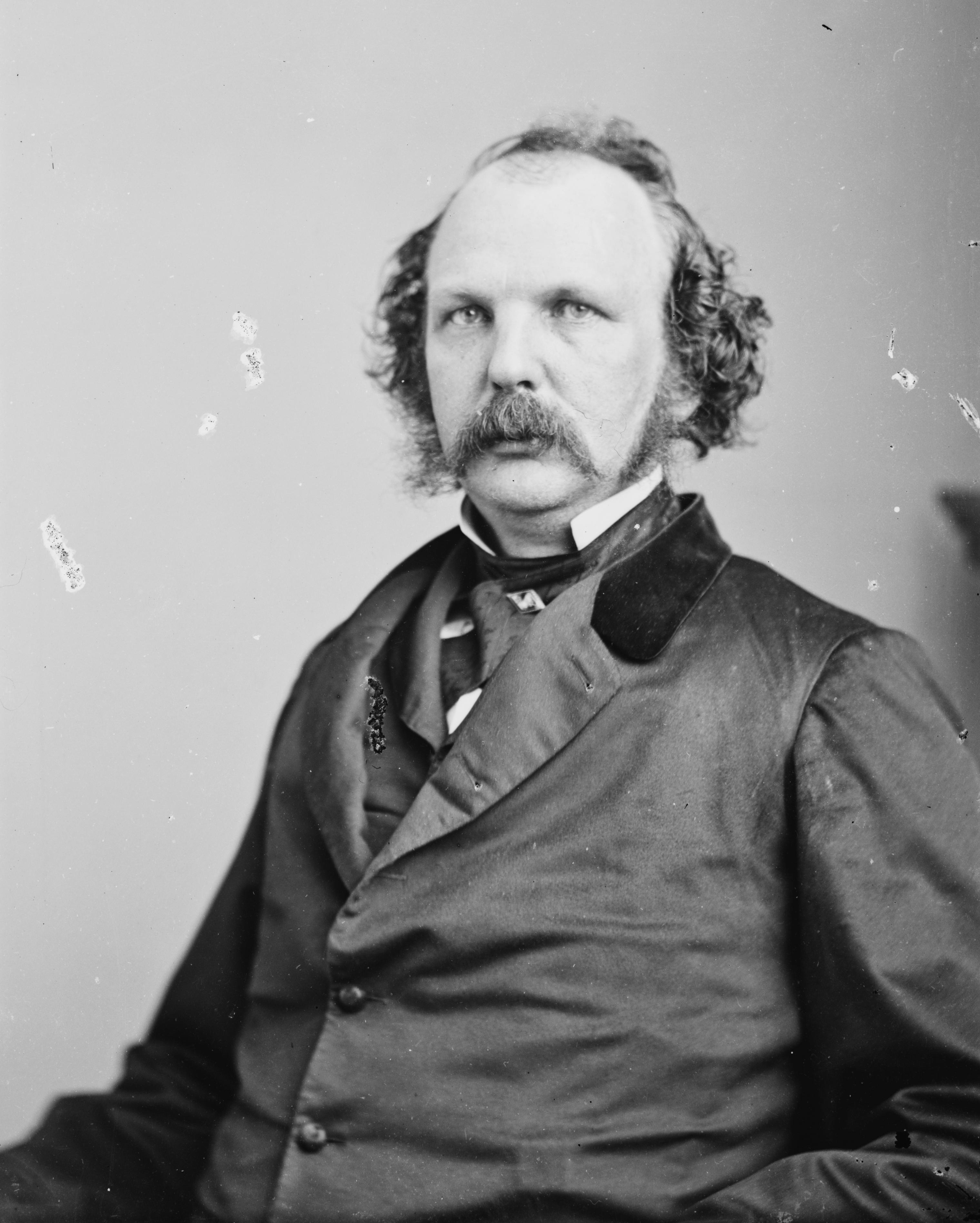
Nominee	Erastus Fairbanks	John Godfrey Saxe	Robert Harvey
Party	Republican	Douglas Democratic	Breckinridge Democratic
Popular vote	34,188	11,795	2,115
Percentage	71.07%	24.52%	4.40%
- County results Fairbanks: 50–60% 60–70% 70–80% 80–90%
Governor before election
Hiland Hall
Republican
Elected Governor
Erastus Fairbanks
Republican

The 1860 Vermont gubernatorial election for governor of Vermont was held on Tuesday, September 4. In keeping with the "Mountain Rule", incumbent Republican Hiland Hall was not a candidate for a third one-year term. The Republican nominee was former Governor Erastus Fairbanks. With the Democratic Party fracturing nationally over the slavery issue, John Godfrey Saxe, the Democratic nominee against Hall in 1859, ran as a supporter of Stephen A. Douglas for president. Robert Harvey ran as a supporter of Democratic presidential candidate John C. Breckinridge.

Vermont continued to strongly oppose the continuation of slavery and its backing of the Republican Party's abolitionist platform was unwavering. Fairbanks easily defeated both Democrats to win a one-year term. He took his oath of office on October 12.

== General election ==
=== Results ===
1860 Vermont gubernatorial election
Party	Candidate	Votes	%
Republican	Erastus Fairbanks	34,188	71.07
Douglas Democratic	John Godfrey Saxe	11,795	24.52
Breckinridge Democratic	Robert Harvey	2,115	4.40
Write-in		3	0.01
Total votes		48,101	100.0
