= 1864 Vermont gubernatorial election =

- September 6, 1864
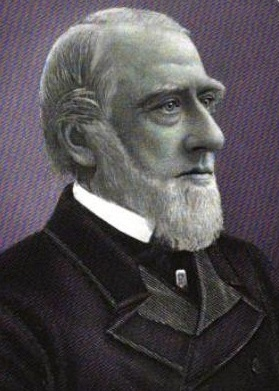

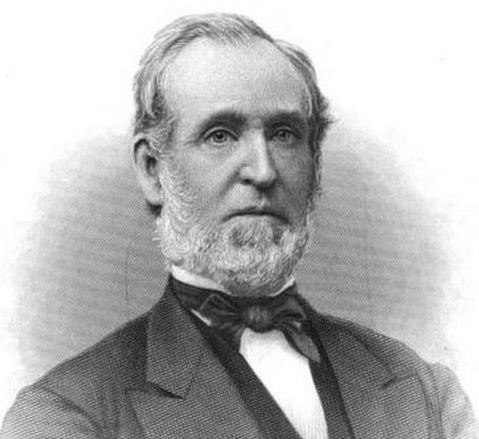
Candidate	J. Gregory Smith	Timothy P. Redfield
Party	Republican	Democratic
Popular vote	32,052	12,637
Percentage	71.54%	28.21%
- County results Smith: 60–70% 70–80%
Governor before election
J. Gregory Smith
Republican
Elected Governor
J. Gregory Smith
Republican

The 1864 Vermont gubernatorial election for governor of Vermont took place on September 6. Incumbent J. Gregory Smith was a candidate for reelection to a second one-year term, in keeping with the provisions of the Republican Party's "Mountain Rule". The Democratic nominee was Timothy P. Redfield, a former member of the Vermont Senate, the Free Soil Party's 1851 nominee for governor, and the Democratic nominee in 1863. In the general election, the Republican Party's dominance of Vermont politics continued, and Smith was easily reelected.

== Results ==
1864 Vermont gubernatorial election
Party	Candidate	Votes	%	±%
Republican	J. Gregory Smith (incumbent)	32,052	71.54	
Democratic	Timothy P. Redfield	12,637	28.21	
Write-in	Other	113	0.25	
Total votes		44,802	100.0	
