= Charles K. Williams =

American judge (1782–1853)

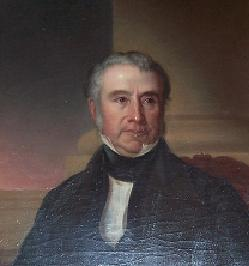

20th Governor of Vermont
- In office October 11, 1850 – October 1, 1852
- Lieutenant: Robert Pierpoint
- Preceded by: Carlos Coolidge
- Succeeded by: Erastus Fairbanks

Chief Justice of the Vermont Supreme Court
- In office 1833–1845
- Preceded by: Titus Hutchinson
- Succeeded by: Stephen Royce

United States Collector of Customs for the District of Vermont
- In office 1826–1829
- Preceded by: James Fisk
- Succeeded by: Archibald W. Hyde

Associate Justice of the Vermont Supreme Court
- In office 1822–1824
- Preceded by: William Brayton
- Succeeded by: Asa Aikens

State's Attorney of Rutland County, Vermont
- In office 1814–1815
- Preceded by: Rollin Carolas Mallary
- Succeeded by: Rollin Carolas Mallary

Member of the Vermont House of Representatives from Rutland Town, Vermont
- In office 1820–1822
- Preceded by: Robert Pierpoint
- Succeeded by: Edmund Douglass
- In office 1814–1816
- Preceded by: James D. Butler
- Succeeded by: William Denison
- In office 1811–1812
- Preceded by: Chauncey Thrall
- Succeeded by: James D. Butler
- In office 1809–1810
- Preceded by: Ezekiel Porter
- Succeeded by: Chauncey Thrall

Personal details
- Born: January 24, 1782 Cambridge, Massachusetts
- Died: March 9, 1853 (aged 71) Rutland, Vermont
- Party: Whig
- Other political affiliations: Liberty
- Spouse: Lucy Langdon
- Children: 9
- Education: Williams College
- Profession: Lawyer

Charles Kilbourne Williams (January 24, 1782 – March 9, 1853) was an American lawyer and politician. He served as Chief Justice of the Vermont Supreme Court from 1834 to 1846 and as 20th governor of Vermont from 1850 to 1852.

== Biography ==
Williams was born in Cambridge, Massachusetts, Middlesex County to Samuel Williams and Jane Kilbourne Williams. He moved with his family to Rutland, Vermont in 1790. He graduated from Williams College in 1800. In 1834, he received the honorary degree of LL.D. from Middlebury.

Williams was elected to the Vermont House of Representatives and served from 1809 to 1810, 1811 to 1812, 1814 to 1816, and 1820 to 1822. He served in the Vermont Militia as a major during the War of 1812. He was promoted to the rank of brigadier general and became commander of a division. He was again elected to the Vermont House of Representatives and served from 1814 to 1815, 1820 to 1821 and in 1849.

He served as Rutland County State's Attorney from 1814 to 1815, and as a justice of the Vermont Supreme Court from 1822 to 1823, succeeding William Brayton. He was Vermont's US Collector of Customs from 1826 to 1829. In 1827 he was State Commissioner for common schools. He served as chief justice of the Vermont Supreme Court from 1834 to 1845. Williams was the author of a precedent setting opinion on the unconstitutionality of legislative acts passed to nullify judicial decisions.

Williams ran unsuccessfully for Governor of Vermont in 1842 as an abolitionist candidate. He served as President of the Council of Censors in 1848. Elected as a Whig, Williams served as Governor of Vermont from 1850 to 1852. While in office, the Habeas Corpus Act was passed, showing the strong anti-slavery sentiments in Vermont. He was reelected in 1851 and did not seek reelection to a third one-year term in 1853.

He served as a Trustee of Middlebury College and as President of the Williams College Alumni Association.

== Family life ==
Williams married Lucy Green Langdon, and they had nine children together.

Williams was the son in law of Congressman Chauncey Langdon.

== Death ==
Williams died in Rutland on March 9, 1853, and is interred at Evergreen Cemetery in Rutland, Vermont.

Party political offices
Preceded by Titus Hutchinson	Liberty nominee for Governor of Vermont; 1842, 1843	Succeeded by William R. Shafter
Preceded by Carlos Coolidge	Whig nominee for Governor of Vermont; 1850, 1851	Succeeded by Erastus Fairbanks
Political offices
Preceded by Carlos Coolidge	Governor of Vermont; 1850–1852	Succeeded by Erastus Fairbanks
