= Joseph Hungerford Brainerd =

American lawyer, newspaper editor, and politician (1801–1879)

- Born: March 22, 1801; Chatham, Connecticut
- Died: March 28, 1879 (aged 78)
- Education: University of Vermont; Yale College
- Occupations: Lawyer, newspaper editor, politician

Joseph Hungerford Brainerd (March 22, 1801 – March 28, 1879) was an American lawyer, newspaper editor, and politician.

== Early life and education ==
Brainerd, eldest child of Joseph S. and Hannah (Hungerford) Brainerd, was born in Chatham, now Portland, Connecticut, on March 22, 1801. His parents moved in 1803 to Troy, New York, and in 1808 to St. Albans, Vermont. He spent two and a half years in the University of Vermont, and then entered Yale College, where he graduated in 1822.

== Career ==
After graduation and about a year spent in teaching in Bryan County, Georgia, he returned to St. Albans and studied law with Asa Aldis. He was admitted to practice in September 1825, and soon opened a law office in St. Albans. In 1831, 1832, and 1833, he was elected one of the Executive Council of the State, a body which was superseded by the present Vermont Senate. In 1831 he also became editor and proprietor of an Anti-Masonic paper in St Albans, called the Franklin Journal, which he conducted for about five years. In April 1834, he was appointed Clerk of the Courts of Franklin County, which office he held until his resignation in August 1872. For forty years before his death he was one of the deacons of the Congregational church in St. Albans.

== Personal life ==
Brainerd was married, on May 8, 1839, to Fanny Partridge of Hatfield, Massachusetts, who died May 10, 1848, a few weeks after the birth of their last child. He was again married, May 26, 1857, to Hannah H. Whitney, a sister of his late wife, and the widow of David S. Whitney, of Northampton, Massachusetts. She died November 18, 1859. Of his four children, all by the first marriage, a son died in prison at Andersonville, Georgia, in 1864, and a daughter died in childhood; the second son, George Cotton Brainerd, was a graduate of Yale in 1867. Brainerd died at the family homestead, March 28, 1879, aged 78 years.
