= J. Gregory Smith =

American businessman and politician (1818–1891)

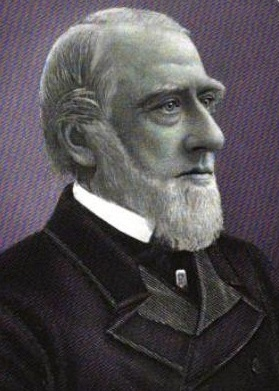

28th Governor of Vermont
- In office October 9, 1863 – October 13, 1865
- Lieutenant: Paul Dillingham
- Preceded by: Frederick Holbrook
- Succeeded by: Paul Dillingham

Speaker of the Vermont House of Representatives
- In office 1862–1863
- Preceded by: Augustus P. Hunton
- Succeeded by: Abraham B. Gardner

Member of the Vermont House of Representatives from St. Albans
- In office 1860–1863
- Preceded by: Albert G. Soule
- Succeeded by: Worthington Curtis Smith

Personal details
- Born: John Gregory Smith; July 22, 1818 St. Albans, Vermont
- Died: November 6, 1891 (aged 73) St. Albans, Vermont
- Party: Republican
- Spouse: Ann Brainerd (m. 1842-1891, his death)
- Relations: John Smith (father); Lawrence Brainerd (father in law); Worthington Curtis Smith (brother); F. Stewart Stranahan (brother in law)
- Children: 6 (including Edward Curtis Smith)
- Education: University of Vermont (BA, MA); Yale Law School (attended)
- Profession: Attorney; Business executive

John Gregory Smith (July 22, 1818 – November 6, 1891) was an American businessman and politician. He is most notable for serving as the 28th governor of Vermont from 1863 to 1865, the last of Vermont's Civil War chief executives.

== Biography ==
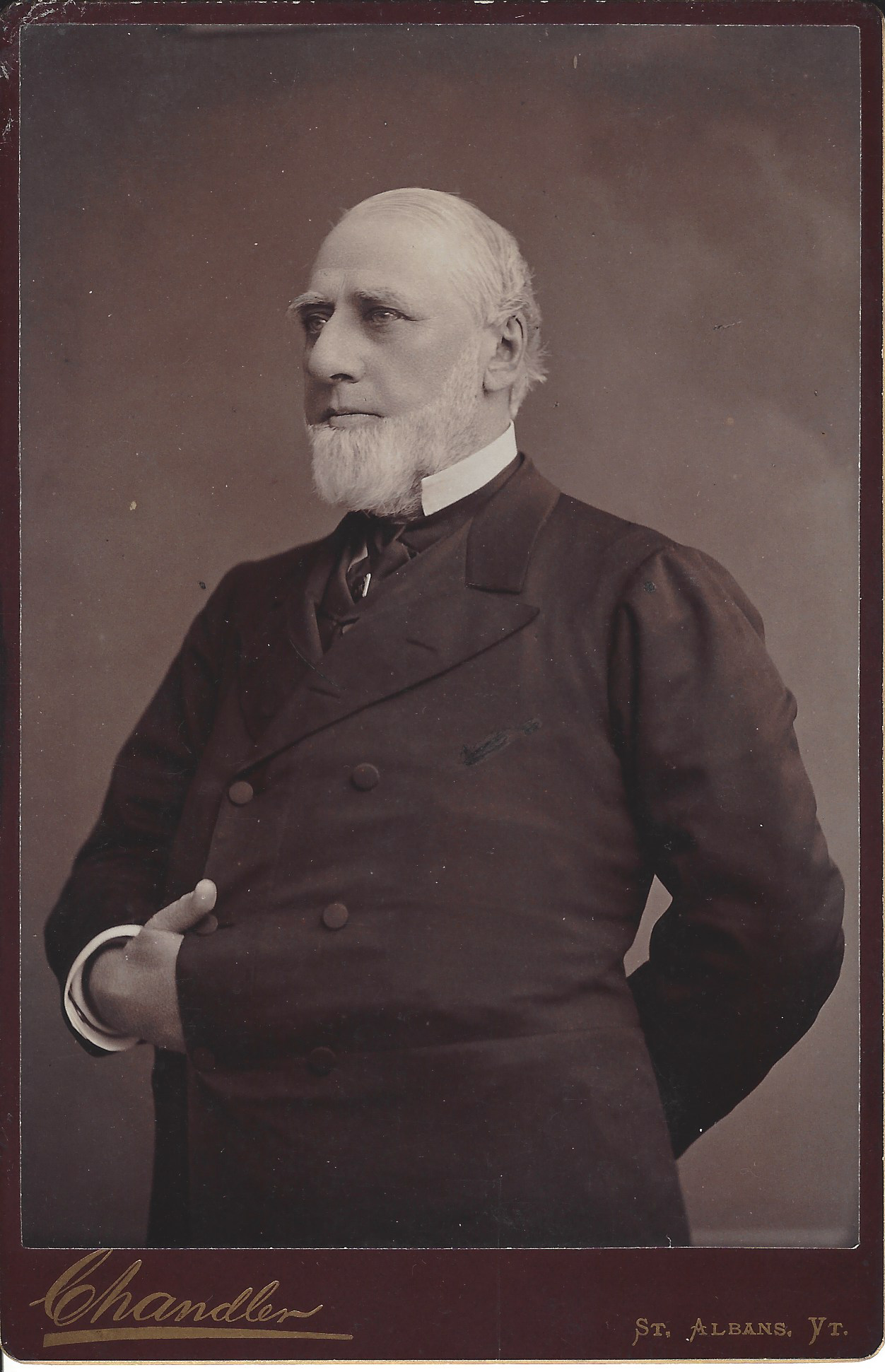
Undated cabinet photo by W. D. Chandler of St. Albans, Vermont

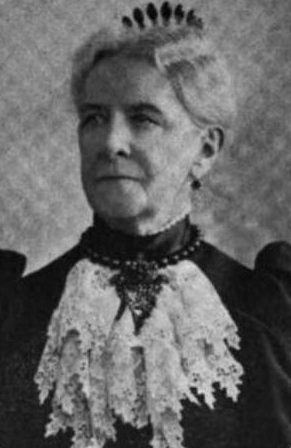
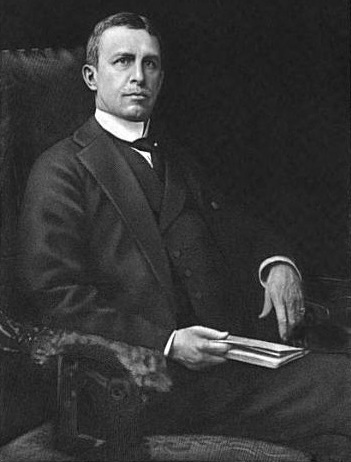
Smith's wife Ann Eliza (left) and son Edward

Smith was born in 1818 in St. Albans, Vermont, son of John Smith and Maria (Curtis) Smith. His father was a pioneer railroad builder in Vermont, and a leading lawyer and political figure. He served one term in the US Congress, beginning in 1839.

J. Gregory Smith graduated from the University of Vermont in 1838, where he was a founding member of the Lambda Iota Society, and attended Yale Law School. In 1842, he received his Master of Arts degree from the University of Vermont. In 1877 the university awarded him the honorary degree of LL.D.

In 1842, Smith married Ann Eliza Brainerd, daughter of U.S. Senator Lawrence Brainerd. She became prominent in her own right as the author of several novels and other books. After the death of her father, J. Gregory Smith named Brainerd, Minnesota in honor of his wife's family. He is considered the founder as he selected this site as president of the Northern Pacific Railroad for a crossing of the upper Mississippi River, thus stimulating the town's growth.

Smith's brother Worthington also became a politician, serving in Congress from 1867 to 1871. His son Edward served as governor from 1898 to 1900. In addition, F. Stewart Stranahan was married to Ann Eliza Smith's sister, and Stranahan became prominent in the Smith family businesses before serving as Lieutenant Governor from 1892 to 1894.

== Career ==
Smith became associated with his father in his law practice and railroad management. After his father's death in 1858, he succeeded to the position of trustee under the lease of the Vermont and Canada Railroad. Simultaneously he entered politics, and for many years the career in each line was involved with the other. He was also one of the originators of the Northern Pacific Railway enterprise and was the president of the corporation from 1866 to 1872. Under his lead five hundred and fifty-five miles of the road were built. The family holdings included the St. Albans Foundry, the National Car Company, and the Vermont Iron and Car Company.

Smith was elected to the Vermont Senate in 1858, and reelected in 1859. He served in the Vermont House of Representatives from 1860 to 1863, and in 1862 and 1863 he served as Speaker.

In 1863 he was elected governor, succeeding Frederick Holbrook, and he was re-elected in 1864. His efforts in office were centered on the American Civil War, including obtaining medical care for Vermont soldiers at the front, and securing the right of soldiers in the field to vote by absentee ballot.

His home was a target of the Confederate St. Albans Raid. He was not at home, but his wife was, and her appearance at the front door carrying an unloaded pistol (the only weapon she could find) was enough to cause the raiders to decide to bypass the Smith home while fleeing to Canada.

Following his governorship Smith returned to his business interests, including serving as president of the Northern Pacific Railroad from 1866 to 1872. He was chairman of the state delegation to the Republican National Conventions in 1872, 1880, and 1884. After his retirement as governor he held no public office. He was mentioned as a candidate for the United States Senate in 1886 and 1891, but in both cases he withdrew his name.

== Death ==
Smith died in St. Albans on November 6, 1891, and was interred at Greenwood Cemetery.

Party political offices
Preceded by Frederick Holbrook	Republican nominee for Governor of Vermont; 1863, 1864	Succeeded by Paul Dillingham
Political offices
Preceded by Frederick Holbrook	Governor of Vermont; 1863–1865	Succeeded by Paul Dillingham
Business positions
Preceded by Josiah Perham	President of Northern Pacific Railway; 1866–1872	Succeeded by George Washington Cass
