= William Brayton (Vermont judge) =

American judge (1787–1828)

Associate Justice of the Vermont Supreme Court
- In office 1817–1821
- Preceded by: William A. Palmer
- Succeeded by: Charles K. Williams

Member of the Vermont House of Representatives from Swanton
- In office 1817–1817
- Preceded by: James Brown
- Succeeded by: James Brown

Judge of the Franklin County, Vermont Court
- In office 1815–1816
- Preceded by: Joseph D. Farnsworth
- Succeeded by: Joseph D. Farnsworth

Personal details
- Born: August 27, 1787 Lansingburgh, New York, U.S.
- Died: August 5, 1828 (aged 40) Burlington, Vermont
- Resting place: Elmwood Cemetery, Burlington, Vermont
- Party: Democratic–Republican
- Spouse: Hortensia Penniman (m. 1812–1827, her death)
- Children: 5
- Education: Williams College (attended)
- Profession: Attorney

William Brayton (August 27, 1787 – August 5, 1828) was a Vermont attorney, politician, and judge. He served as a justice of the Vermont Supreme Court from 1817 to 1821.

== Biography ==
William Brayton was born in Lansingburgh, New York (now part of the city of Troy) on August 22, 1787. His family was residing in Greenfield, New York when Brayton attended Williams College from 1800 to 1801. He left college before graduating, studied law, and attained admission to the bar of Franklin County, Vermont in 1807. Brayton settled in Swanton, where he established a successful practice and became active in politics and government as a member of the Democratic-Republican Party. In addition, he served as Swanton's postmaster from 1809 to 1815. Those who studied law under Brayton with the intention of becoming attorneys included David M. Camp. In 1815, Brayton was named presiding judge of the Franklin County Court. In 1816, he was chosen as one of Vermont's presidential electors, and he cast his ballot for James Monroe and Daniel D. Tompkins for president and vice president. In 1817, he represented Swanton in the Vermont House of Representatives.

In 1817, Brayton was appointed a justice of the Vermont Supreme Court, succeeding William A. Palmer, and relocated to St. Albans. He served until 1821, and was succeeded by Charles K. Williams. After leaving the bench he moved to Burlington, where he practiced law until his death.

== Death and burial ==
Brayton died in Burlington on August 5, 1828; he was buried at Elmwood Cemetery in Burlington.

== Family ==
In 1812, Brayton married Hortensia Penniman (1795-1827), the daughter of Frances Montresor (Ethan Allen's widow) and Jabez Penniman. Their children included: Frances Margaret (1814-1854); Agnes Abigail (1816-1902); Cornelia (1817-1855); William Henry (1820-1854); and Hannibal (1823-1825).

Frances was the wife of Henry Norton, and died in Fayetteville, a now defunct community near Elkhorn, Wisconsin. Agnes married John Adam Brinegar, and died in Granby, Missouri. Cornelia was the wife of Valentine Seman Ferris (1809-1879) of Vergennes. William Henry died in California.

== Sources ==
=== Books ===
- General Catalogue of the Non-graduates of Williams College, 1796-1920. Williamstown, MA: Williams College. 1920.
- Allen, Orrin Peer (1907). The Allen Memorial: Descendants of Samuel Allen of Windsor, Conn., 1604-1907. II. Palmer, MA: C. B. Fiske & Company.
- Baldwin, Frederick W. (1886). Biography of the Bar of Orleans County, Vermont. Montpelier, VT: Vermont Watchman and State Journal. p. 59.
- Fleetwood, Frederick G.; Vermont Secretary of State (1902). Vermont Legislative Directory. Montpelier, VT: Vermont Watchman Co.
- Ledoux, Rodney R. (1988). The History of Swanton, Vermont. Swanton, VT: Swanton Historical Society.
- Thompson, Zadock (1842). History of Vermont, Natural, Civil and Statistical. Burlington, VT: Chauncey Goodrich.

=== Internet ===
- Library of Congress Transcript (January 10, 2017). "Catalogue of Students in Williams' College, November 1800" (PDF). cdn.loc.gov/. Washington, DC: Library of Congress.
- "Elmwood Cemetery: a walking tour of Burlington's history" (PDF).

=== Magazines ===
- Gilles, Paul S. (Summer 2012). "Ruminations: The Trial of Jesse and Stephen Boorn". Vermont Bar Journal. Montpelier, VT: Vermont Bar Association.
- Taft, Russell S. (February 1, 1894). "The Supreme Court of Vermont, Part III: William Brayton". The Green Bag. Boston, MA: Boston Book Company.

Political offices
Preceded by William A. Palmer	Justice of the Vermont Supreme Court; 1817–1821	Succeeded by Charles K. Williams
