= Charles Davenport (manufacturer) =

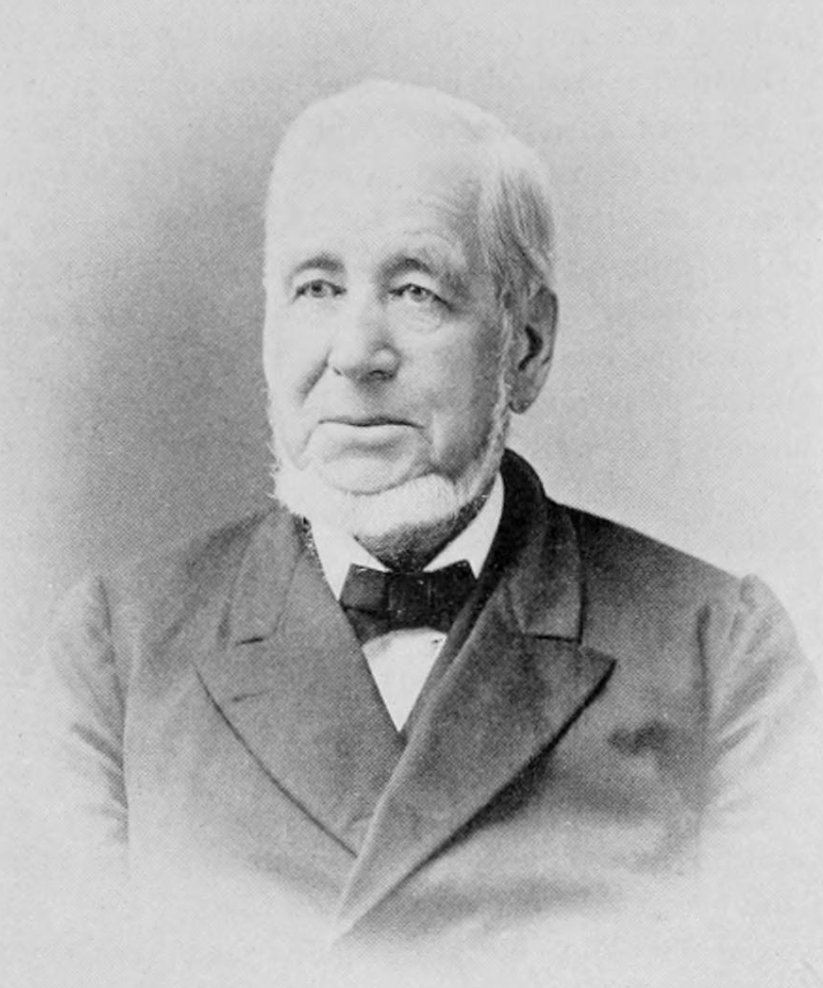
- Born: May 25, 1812; Newton Upper Falls, Massachusetts
- Died: February 14, 1903 (aged 90); Watertown, Massachusetts
- Occupation: Businessman

Charles Davenport (May 25, 1812 – February 14, 1903) was a manufacturer of passenger cars for railroads, and made some of the first of these cars used in the United States.

== Biography ==
Charles Davenport was born in Newton Upper Falls, Massachusetts on May 25, 1812. After learning to build coaches and carriages, he went into business for himself in 1832 in Cambridge, Massachusetts. In 1834, as the firm of Davenport & Bridges, he entered upon the business of building railroad cars. For some years, his firm also built locomotives. As a car builder, his was not only a pioneer firm in the United States, but for the 22 years during which he carried on the business his was the largest car establishment in the country, having factories at Cambridgeport, and from 1840 to 1850 also at Piermont and Newburg, New York.

He built his first cars for the Boston and Worcester Railroad, early in 1835. They were after the pattern of a long omnibus built on four wheels, seating 24, to be entered by a central door upon either side, and from a step running the length of the car, as on late 19th century street cars. Within the car, the fixed seats faced all one way, and were separated on either side by a central aisle the length of the car. The car was turned about on a turntable at the end of each trip.

The next series of cars were built with seats that had reversible backs, thus obviating the need of turning around the car itself. In 1837 he built the entrance door and platform steps at the ends of the car, instead of the side, thus opening a passageway through a train from car to car. In 1838-1839 he built the first 8-wheel car, to seat 60, and in 1840 the first 16-wheel car, to carry 76 passengers.

In 1849, business reverses cost Davenport a good deal of his wealth, but he made a recovery in years after. In 1856 he retired from business, having constructed over $4,000,000 worth of cars for over fifty different railroads in the United States and Cuba.

In retirement, he traveled much. He was an advocate and promoter of many public improvements in and about the city of Boston. Among others, he originated the earliest plan for the Boston Back Bay park, and the Charles River embankment improvement in Cambridge.

He died in Watertown, Massachusetts on February 14, 1903.
