= Paul Dillingham =

American lawyer and politician (1799–1891)

Paul Dillingham Jr.
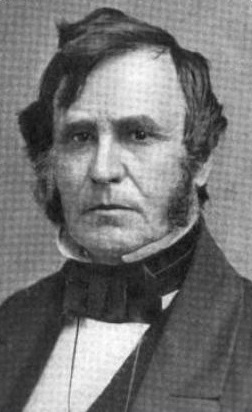

29th Governor of Vermont
- In office October 13, 1865 – October 13, 1867
- Lieutenant: Abraham B. Gardner
- Preceded by: J. Gregory Smith
- Succeeded by: John B. Page

24th Lieutenant Governor of Vermont
- In office 1862–1865
- Governor: J. Gregory Smith
- Preceded by: Levi Underwood
- Succeeded by: Abraham B. Gardner

Member of the U.S. House of Representatives from Vermont's 4th district
- In office March 4, 1843 – March 3, 1847
- Preceded by: Augustus Young
- Succeeded by: Lucius B. Peck

Member of the Vermont Senate from Washington County
- In office 1861–1862 Serving with Charles W. Willard
- Preceded by: Calvin Fullerton, Charles W. Willard
- Succeeded by: Roderick Richardson, Addison Peck, Philander D. Bradford
- In office 1841–1843 Serving with Nathaniel Eaton (1841), Wooster Sprague (1842)
- Preceded by: Leonard Keith, Leander Warren, Isaac T. Davis
- Succeeded by: Wooster Sprague, Jacob Scott

Member of the Vermont House of Representatives from Waterbury
- In office 1837–1840
- Preceded by: Thaddeus Clough
- Succeeded by: William W. Wells
- In office 1833–1835
- Preceded by: Amasa Pride
- Succeeded by: None (no selection in 1835)

State's Attorney of Washington County, Vermont
- In office 1835–1839
- Preceded by: Azel Spaulding
- Succeeded by: Homer W. Heaton

Personal details
- Born: August 10, 1799 Shutesbury, Massachusetts, US
- Died: July 26, 1891 (aged 91) Waterbury, Vermont, US
- Resting place: Village Cemetery, Waterbury, Vermont
- Party: Democratic (before 1860); Republican (from 1860)
- Spouse(s): Sarah Partridge Carpenter Dillingham; Julia Carpenter Dillingham
- Relations: Matthew H. Carpenter (son in law)
- Children: 7, including William Paul Dillingham
- Profession: Attorney

Paul Dillingham Jr. (August 10, 1799 – July 26, 1891) was an American lawyer and politician. He served as a U.S. representative from Vermont, the 24th lieutenant governor of Vermont from 1862 to 1865, and the 29th governor of Vermont from 1865 to 1867.

== Early life ==
Dillingham was born in Shutesbury, Massachusetts, on August 10, 1799, a son of Paul Dillingham Sr. and Hannah (Smith) Dillingham. The Dillingham family moved to Waterbury, Vermont in 1805, where Dillingham worked on the family farm and attended the district school in Waterbury and Montpelier's Washington County Grammar School. In 1820, he commenced studying law in the office of Judge Daniel Carpenter. He was admitted to the bar in March 1823, and in April he began to practice in Waterbury as Carpenter's partner. He gained a reputation throughout Vermont as a skilled trial lawyer with a superior ability to present oral arguments to judges and juries.

== Early career ==
Entering politics as a Democrat, Dillingham served as a Waterbury justice of the peace from 1826 to 1844, and town clerk from 1829 to 1844. He served as Waterbury's member of the Vermont House of Representatives from 1833 to 1835, as State's Attorney of Washington County from 1835 to 1839, and again as Waterbury's member of the Vermont House from 1837 to 1840. Dillingham served as a delegate to the State constitutional convention of 1836, and a member of the Vermont State Senate in 1841 and 1842.

== Congressman ==
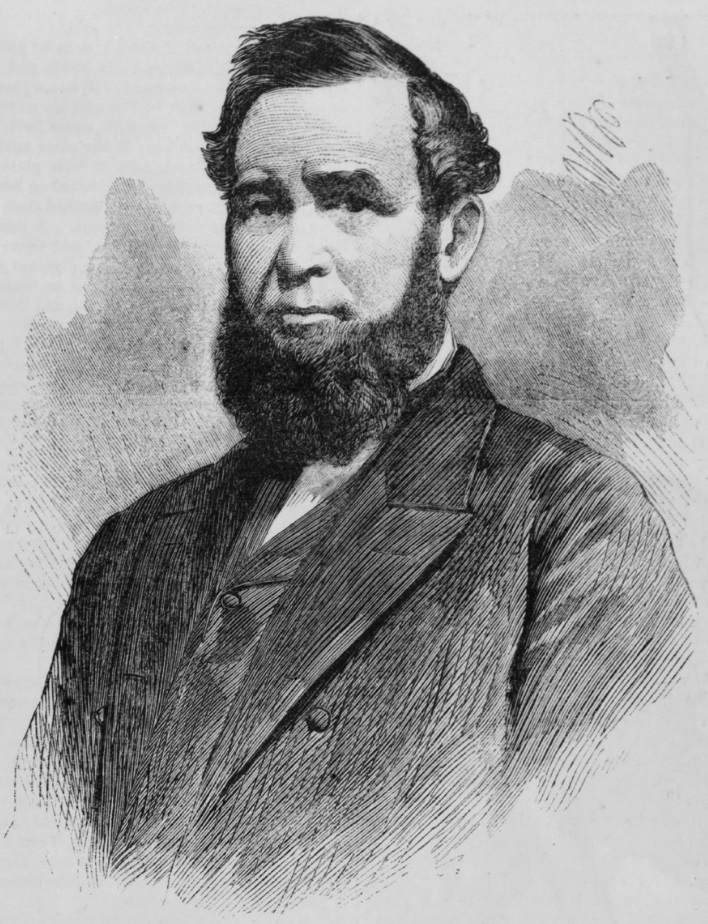
Dillingham in an 1866 Harper's Weekly illustration when he was governor.

Dillingham was elected as a to the Twenty-eighth and Twenty-ninth Congresses (March 4, 1843 – March 3, 1847). He was not a candidate for renomination in 1846. During Dillingham's House service, he served on the Judiciary Committee and the Committee on Claims. The only Democrat in Vermont's Congressional delegation, he favored the annexation of Texas and supported US involvement in the Mexican-American War.

Dillingham was a delegate to the 1857 State constitutional convention. In 1861, Dillingham served again in the Vermont Senate.

== Lieutenant governor ==
Increasingly opposed to slavery and secession, Dillingham declined the Democratic Party's 1860 nomination for governor. When the American Civil War started, he officially changed his allegiance from Democratic to Republican. He served as the lieutenant governor from 1862 to 1865. Holding office at the height of the war, Dillingham's efforts were focused on aiding governors Frederick Holbrook and J. Gregory Smith to obtain passage of laws for raising, paying, and equipping soldiers for the Union Army. In addition, he campaigned throughout Vermont for the Republican (Unionist) ticket of Abraham Lincoln and Andrew Johnson in the 1864 United States presidential election.

== Governor ==
Dillingham served as the 29th governor of Vermont from 1865 to 1867. As governor, he created Vermont's first reform school and established Vermont's first normal school for teacher training (now Vermont Technical College). It also fell to Dillingham to appoint two members of the U.S. Senate to replace senators who had died. To succeed Jacob Collamer, Dillingham selected Luke P. Poland. To replace Solomon Foot, Dillingham first offered the appointment to former governor J. Gregory Smith. When Smith declined, Dillingham selected George F. Edmunds.

== Later life ==
He resumed the practice of law, and was a delegate to the State constitutional convention in 1870. He retired in 1875.

== Death and burial ==
Dillingham died at his home in Waterbury on July 26, 1891. He is interred in the Village Cemetery in Waterbury.

== Family ==
He married Sarah Partridge Carpenter, a daughter of Daniel Carpenter. She died on September 20, 1831, and on September 5, 1832, Dillingham married Sarah's sister Julia. He had seven children who lived to adulthood, including William Paul Dillingham, who served as governor and U.S. Senator. Dillingham was also the father in law of Senator Matthew H. Carpenter.

Party political offices
Preceded by Nathan Smilie	Democratic nominee for Governor of Vermont; 1840	Succeeded by Nathan Smilie
Preceded by John Smith	Democratic nominee for Governor of Vermont; 1847, 1848	Succeeded by Jonas Clark
Preceded by Levi Underwood	Republican nominee for Lieutenant Governor of Vermont; 1862, 1863, 1864	Succeeded by Abraham B. Gardner
Preceded by J. Gregory Smith	Republican nominee for Governor of Vermont; 1865, 1866	Succeeded by John B. Page
U.S. House of Representatives
Preceded by Augustus Young	Member of the U.S. House of Representatives from Vermont's 4th congressional district 1843–1847	Succeeded by Lucius B. Peck
Political offices
Preceded by Levi Underwood	Lieutenant Governor of Vermont; 1862–1865	Succeeded by Abraham B. Gardner
Preceded by J. Gregory Smith	Governor of Vermont; 1865–1867	Succeeded by John B. Page
