= Brattleboro Reformer =

Newspaper in Vermont, US

- Type: Daily newspaper
- Format: Broadsheet
- Owner: Pavel Belogour
- Publisher: Jordan Brechenser
- Managing editor: Melanie Winters
- Founded: August 19, 1876 (weekly); March 3, 1913 (daily)
- Headquarters: 70 Landmark Hill Drive; Brattleboro, Vermont, U.S.
- Website: reformer.com

The Brattleboro Reformer is the third-largest daily newspaper in the U.S. state of Vermont. With a weekday circulation of just over 10,000, it is behind the Burlington Free Press and the Rutland Herald, respectively. It publishes six days a week, Monday through Saturday, with its Weekend Reformer having the largest readership; the offices of the paper are in Brattleboro, Vermont, and it has a market penetration (weekday sales per 100 households) of 62.8 in its home zip code.

The Reformer covers all of Windham County, Vermont, as well as some towns in neighboring Cheshire County, New Hampshire. It is owned by Vermont News and Media LLC.

The Reformer was possibly the first newspaper in the United States to run same-sex union announcements in parallel to the usual wedding notices, beginning the practice in 1989, well before the state of Vermont legalized civil unions.

It is the only newspaper in the United States called "Reformer."

== History from 19th to mid-20th century ==
The Reformer published its first issue, under the name Windham County Reformer, in 1876. Publisher Charles N. Davenport was a prominent lawyer and supporter of the Democratic Party. Davenport founded the paper in part due to dissatisfaction with what he saw as a Republican bias in the coverage by the Vermont Phoenix, the main political paper in the state. The presidential campaign at the time, between Republican Rutherford B. Hayes and Democrat Samuel J. Tilden prompted the Vermont Record and Farmer, the third paper in the state, to describe the new paper as dedicated to "Tilden and reform."

Some local historians believe that the original conception of the paper was for it to last only for the duration of the 1876 campaign. Davenport's son, Charles H. inherited the paper on his father's death, running the paper for twenty-five years until 1901. T. P. James, (whose fame rests on his publication of the ending to "Mystery of Edwin Drood, Complete" which James claimed Dicken's ghost had dictated to him) was the co-editor and co-publisher of the Reformer, along with Charles H. Davenport. (James left the paper within about a year, after a disagreement with Davenport, and founded the Independent in Brattleboro, in which he attacked Davenport's reputation.) The Reformer went from a weekly to twice-weekly publication schedule in 1897. While the paper had financial troubles for many years, it managed to maintain a continuous publication schedule.

Charles H, sold the paper to Jacob G. Ullery, who then sold the paper to the Vermont Printing company in 1903. The new editors turned the paper away from its partisan Democrat emphasis. The Phoenix and Reformer were merged in March 1913 under the management of the newly formed Brattleboro Publishing Company, one half owned by Walter Hubbard and the other half by Ephraim Crane and Howard Crosby Rice. Rice became the publisher and editor in 1918. The Phoenix served as the Reformer's weekly companion. Moreover, the Reformer went to a daily publication schedule. The Phoenix weekly was discontinued in 1955.

Howard Rice was publisher and editor of the Reformer until he handed over the editor post to his son-in-law, John Simpson Hooper, in 1950, and the publisher post in 1964. John Hooper was editor and publisher of the Reformer until he retired in 1971. He was instrumental in turning the paper from a Republican to an independent paper, described on its masthead as: "An independent newspaper, dedicated to conservation and progress in public and humane affairs". In 1971, Norman Runnion became managing editor until 1989.

The 1913 merger was considered by some to be the "true" founding date of the paper; according to an article in the March 4, 1925 issue, "Daily Reformer Now 15 Years Old":

The Brattleboro Daily Reformer celebrated yesterday its 15th anniversary as a daily. As a weekly publication The Reformer dates back to the dim and distant date of 1876, but its debut as a daily – with that word ‘Daily’ in emphatic black-face letter-spaced Gothic type on its first page – came on Monday, March 3, 1913.

Records at the Brooks Memorial Library, the main library of Brattleboro, list the publication history of the paper in 2006 as

Windham County Reformer, 1876-1897
Semi-weekly Windham County Reformer, 1897-1901
Windham County Reformer, 1901-1912,
Brattleboro Daily Reformer (after merger with Vermont Phoenix), 1913-1955
Brattleboro Daily Reformer and Vermont Phoenix, 1955-1973
Brattleboro Reformer, 1973-present

Much of the historical information in this section comes from a special 1981 section of the Reformer, published on the occasion of the paper's moving from downtown Brattleboro to its headquarters on Black Mountain Road.

== The Reformer in the late-20th and 21st centuries ==
By the time Howard Rice died, he wholly owned the Reformer, leaving it in his will to his three children, Howard, Eleanor and Marion (and her husband John Hooper). It was then sold to the Miller Group of Newspapers in Pittsfield, Mass. By January 2015, it was owned by New England Newspaper Incorporated, under corporate owner, Digital First Media, which at the time was trying to sell off its 76 daily and 160 weekly newspapers. By July 2015, the Reformer had only two reporters left and the editor post was shared with the Bennington Banner. New England Newspapers was sold to local owners in 2016.

In May 2021 the New England Newspapers sold Brattleboro Reformer, Bennington Banner and Manchester Journal to Vermont News and Media LLC, which is owned by local businessman and investor, Paul Belogour. Its president and publisher is Jordan Brechenser, who had been employed by the company under its previous ownerships dating back to 2002.

=== Staff and union controversies ===
In the past the paper has been controversial for running letters to the editor that many have found offensive; in 2003 it ran an antisemitic letter whose publication the then–managing editor Kathryn Casa defended, saying that "only by bringing [bigoted opinions] into the open can we expose and eliminate them."

Union leaders and members of the public protested in 2003, when the management fired a reporter during a campaign to form a union at the Reformer. More than 1,000 people signed a petition that called on Media News to re-hire the union supporter.

Readers complained when the parent company fired managing editor Kathryn Casa without giving a reason in 2004. Critics asserted that the firing was in part connected to her liberal politics; on the other hand, Casa was accused of intimidating staff into voting against a union drive. Judith Gorman, a columnist for the paper, resigned in protest following Casa's dismissal; about 150 people protested Casa's dismissal outside the Reformer offices on April 25 of that year.
