= Charles N. Davenport =

Vermont attorney and businessman

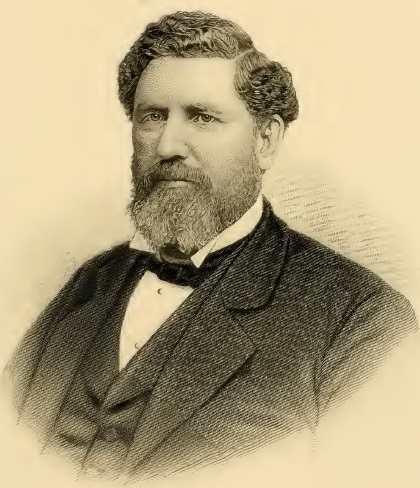
- From 1884's Gazetteer and Business Directory of Windham County, Vt., 1724-1884
- Born: October 20, 1830; Leyden, Massachusetts, U.S.
- Died: April 12, 1882 (aged 51); Brattleboro, Vermont, U.S.
- Resting place: Prospect Hill Cemetery Brattleboro, Vermont, U.S.
- Occupations: Attorney; Businessman; Newspaper publisher
- Political party: Democratic
- Spouse(s): Louisa C. Haynes (m. 1854); Roxana J. (Whiting) Dunklee (m. 1871)
- Children: 6

Charles N. Davenport (October 10, 1830 – April 12, 1882) was an American attorney, businessman, and political candidate from Vermont. A Democrat during the American Civil War and post-war era when Republicans won every election for statewide office, Davenport was an unsuccessful candidate for offices including governor and U.S. representative. He was a delegate to many local, state, and county Democratic conventions, and was the founder of the Brattleboro Reformer newspaper.

A native of Leyden, Massachusetts, Davenport was educated at academies in Massachusetts and Vermont, studied law, and became an attorney in the Vermont town of Wilmington. A highly regarded orator and courtroom advocate, he practiced in the state and federal courts of Vermont, Massachusetts, and New Hampshire, and was frequently called upon to give speeches at political gatherings and other meetings. After relocating from Wilmington to Brattleboro, Davenport continued to practice law while also becoming active in banking, railroads, and ownership of a farm in Guilford.

Davenport was a Democrat in politics during the era when Vermont became a one-party Republican state as a result of Vermonters' opposition to slavery. He was a delegate to many local, state, and national conventions, and was an unsuccessful candidate for offices including state's attorney, lieutenant governor, governor, and United States representative. In his later years, he opposed the state and national Republican and Democratic parties because he regarded them as rife with corruption. He attempted to found an independent anti-corruption party in Vermont in the 1870s, but by 1880 he had returned to the regular Democratic fold.

In 1882, Davenport sold his legal practice because he was in ill health. He operated a lumber business and sawmill, hoping that physical activity in the outdoors would help him regain his health. It improved temporarily, but he died in Brattleboro on April 12, 1882. Davenport was buried at Prospect Hill Cemetery in Brattleboro.

== Early life ==
Charles Newton Davenport was born in Leyden, Massachusetts on April 12, 1830, the son of Calvin N. Davenport and Lucy Woodward (White) Davenport. He was raised and educated in Leyden and attended Shelburne Falls Academy in Massachusetts and Melrose Seminary in West Brattleboro, Vermont. In 1851, he moved to Wilmington, Vermont, where he studied law in the office of attorney Oscar L. Shafter. Davenport was admitted to the bar in 1854 and began to practice in partnership with Shafter.

== Legal and business career ==
In 1854, Shafter moved to California, after which Davenport practiced in Wilmington. In 1858, Kittredge Haskins began to study in Davenport's office, and after attaining admission to the bar in 1861, Haskins practiced in partnership with Davenport. In 1868, Davenport moved to Brattleboro, Vermont, where he continued to practice law. Davenport was also interested in other business ventures; in 1874 he was elected to the board of directors of Vermont National Bank, Brattleboro. In 1875, he was elected a director of the newly organized Peoples National Bank of Brattleboro. In addition to law and banking, Davenport also maintained a farm in Guilford, Vermont. After several years of practice in Brattleboro, Jonathan G. Eddy joined Davenport, and Davenport's office became the partnership of Davenport and Eddy. Davenport was a successful trial attorney, and he practiced in the state and federal courts of Vermont, Massachusetts, and New Hampshire. Peers and courtroom observers commented frequently on Davenport's skill as an advocate and orator.

In 1876, Davenport began publication of The Reformer, a newspaper he created to support Samuel Tilden's presidential candidacy. He continued the paper after the election, and his son Charles later took over as publisher. The Reformer was published for several years with editions covering Windham County, Brattleboro, Bennington, Vermont, and Greenfield, Massachusetts. Charles H. Davenport later sold The Reformer, which continued as the Brattleboro Reformer. In November 1880, Davenport was elected one of the vice presidents of the Vermont Bar Association. In December 1880, Davenport was an original incorporator of the Brattleboro and Vernon Railroad. In January 1882, ill health compelled Davenport to retire from legal business, and he sold his practice to James Loren Martin.

== Political career ==
Davenport was active in the Democratic Party throughout his career, even as Vermont's opposition to slavery led it to exclusively support first the Whigs, and later the Republicans in statewide elections. In 1855, the Whig Party had become largely dormant in Vermont, and the Republican Party had not yet gained a following, and the Know Nothing movement, an anti-immigrant, anti-Catholic effort, was at its peak. Davenport was an unsuccessful candidate for State's Attorney of Windham County as the candidate of an anti-Know Nothing coalition that included Democrats.

In October 1855, Davenport was the Democratic Party's candidate for Secretary of State of Vermont, and lost the legislative election to Charles W. Willard. In July 1858, he was chosen one of the state Democratic convention's vice presidents. In 1860, Davenport supported Stephen A. Douglas for president; in addition to serving as president of his congressional district's meeting held to choose national convention delegates, Davenport was named an alternate delegate to the national convention. During the American Civil War, Davenport maintained his affiliation with the Democratic Party, but remained loyal to the Union.

In 1861 and 1862, Davenport was the unsuccessful Democratic nominee for State's Attorney of Windham County. In June 1863, Davenport was elected president of the Vermont Democratic Party's state convention. In July 1863, he was chosen as the Democratic nominee to represent Vermont's 2nd congressional district, but the general election was won by Republican incumbent Justin S. Morrill. In July 1864, the state Democratic convention chose Davenport as the party's nominee for Lieutenant governor of Vermont, and he lost the general election to incumbent Republican Paul Dillingham.

In 1865 and 1866, Davenport was the Democratic nominee for Governor of Vermont, and was defeated in both general elections by Dillingham, who was the Republican nominee. In 1868, he was a delegate to the Democratic National Convention that nominated Horatio Seymour for the presidency. In July 1870, Davenport was one of the organizers of a temperance society in Brattleboro, and was chosen as its president. In September 1870, 1872, and 1874, Davenport was elected to terms as a Brattleboro justice of the peace.

In the 1872 United States presidential election, most Democrats supported Horace Greeley, the nominee of the short-lived Liberal Republican Party. Davenport was among the Vermont Democrats who refused to back Greeley, instead announcing publicly his intention to support Charles O'Conor, the nominee of the Straight-Out Democratic Party. He was subsequently chosen as an O'Conor elector, but Vermont was carried in the general election by incumbent Republican Ulysses S. Grant.

In July 1874, Davenport was invited to attend the state Democratic convention; he declined, and in a letter to the convention's chairman expressed his belief that both the Democratic and Republican parties were interested only in obtaining power in order to take advantage of the spoils system. Despite his dissatisfaction with the national and state parties, in August he agreed to deliver the keynote address to the Windham County Democratic convention. Later that month, he declined the Democratic nomination for Congress in Vermont's 2nd district, giving as his reason his belief that the Democratic and Republican parties at the national level were corrupt. He still appeared on the ballot despite his refusal, and finished a distant third to Dudley Chase Denison and Luke P. Poland.

By 1876, Davenport resumed his support of the national Democratic Party, and he was selected as a delegate to that year's Democratic National Convention. At the convention and during the campaign, he backed the presidential candidacy of Samuel Tilden. Davenport's support for Tilden was based on the widely held view of Tilden as a reformer and opponent of corruption, which stemmed largely from his fights against New York's Tammany Hall political machine of William M. Tweed and the corrupt Canal Ring.

In 1878, Davenport and others dissatisfied with state and national Republican and Democratic leadership, including Abraham B. Gardner, attempted to form an independent movement to field candidates for the state legislature and other offices. The movement was unsuccessful, and Republicans continued to dominate Vermont politics and government. By 1880, Davenport had returned to the regular Democratic fold; he attended the state party convention in April, and was chairman of the 2nd congressional district's convention caucus. In September 1880, he was the featured speaker at the Windham County Democratic rally held in Saxtons River.

== Later life and death ==
After selling his law practice, Davenport purchased an interest in a Brattleboro lumber business and sawmill, intending to regain his health through outdoor physical activity. The business was successful and his physical condition temporarily improved, but it took a subsequent turn for the worse, and he died in Brattleboro on April 12, 1882. Davenport was buried at Prospect Hill Cemetery in Brattleboro.

=== Legacy ===
A portrait of Davenport is displayed in the Rockingham Meeting House in Rockingham, Vermont; the brass plaque displayed with it indicates that despite his political involvement, Davenport held no offices because he was a Democrat. The portrait and plaque are often recalled by Vermont Democrats who acknowledge Davenport as an important party leader during part of the more than 100 years when the state was controlled entirely by Republicans. For many years, the Windham County Democratic Committee's annual fundraising event, the Davenport Day Dinner, commemorated Davenport's party leadership during the 1800s.

== Family ==
In 1854, Davenport married Louisa C. Haynes of Lowell, Massachusetts. They were the parents of six children, two of whom reached adulthood. Charles Haynes Davenport (1856–1921) was the publisher of the Brattleboro Reformer. Herbert Joseph Davenport (1861–1931) was a prominent economist, college professor, and author. Louisa Haynes Davenport died in October 1870, and in 1871, Davenport married Roxana J. (Whiting) Dunklee, who died in 1881.
