= Aldis =

Aldis may refer to:

- Aldis (name), a masculine given name
- Aldis (surname), with a list of people
- Aldis SRL, a Romanian meat and smallgoods processing company
- Aldis lamp, a type of signal lamp
- ALDIS (Austrian Lightning Detection & Information System) a lightning detection sensor network on the territory of Austria

== See also ==
- Aldi, a German retail multinational
- Alldis, a surname
- Altis (disambiguation)
- Aldiss Award, a literary award
