= Aldis (surname) =

Aldis is a surname, and may refer to:

- Archie Aldis Emmerson (born 1929), American businessman
- Asa Aldis (1770–1847), American lawyer and judge
- Asa O. Aldis (1811–1891), American lawyer and diplomat
- Charles Aldis (1776–1863), English surgeon
- Charles James Berridge Aldis (1808–1872), English physician
- Dorothy Aldis (1896–1966), American children's author and poet
- John Aldis (fl. 1650 – c. 1690), American politician
- Mary Aldis (playwright) (1872–1949), American playwright
- Mary Aldis (science writer) (c. 1838 – 1897), New Zealander science writer
- Nathan Aldis (fl. 1640s), American settler
- Nick Aldis (born 1986), English professional wrestler
- Owen Aldis (1926–2001), American behavioural psychologist
- Peter Aldis (1927–2008), English footballer
- W. H. Aldis (1871–1948), English Protestant missionary

== See also ==
- Alldis, another surname
- Brian Aldiss (1925–2017), English sci-fi author
