= Alldis =

Alldis is a surname. Notable people with the surname include:

- Barry Alldis (1930–1982), Australian radio personality
- Dominic Alldis (born 1962), English jazz musician
- Gillie Alldis (1920–1998), English footballer
- Jim Alldis Jr. (1949–2023), English cricketer
- Jim Alldis Sr. (1916–1995), English cricket scorer and manager
- John Alldis (1929–2010), English conductor
- Michael Alldis (born 1968), English boxer
- Septimus Alldis (1886–1929), Australian politician

== See also ==
- Aldis (surname)
- Aldis (disambiguation)
