= Justice Turner =

Justice Turner may refer to:

- Abe W. Turner (1893–1947), associate justice of the Utah Supreme Court
- Bates Turner (1760–1847), associate justice of the Arkansas Supreme Court
- Edward Turner (judge) (1778–1860), associate justice of the Supreme Court of Mississippi
- Edward C. Turner (1872–1950), associate justice of the Supreme Court of Ohio
- George Turner (Nevada judge) (1828–1885), associate justice of the Territorial Supreme Court of Nevada
- George Turner (American politician) (1850–1932), associate justice of the Supreme Court of the Territory of Washington
- Henry G. Turner (1839–1904), associate justice of the Supreme Court of Georgia
- Jesse Turner (Arkansas judge) (1805–1894), associate justice of the Arkansas Supreme Court
- Josiah Turner (judge) (1811–1907), associate justice of the Michigan Supreme Court
- Mark Turner (judge) (born 1959), judge of the High Court of England and Wales
- Otis H. Turner (1927–2000), associate justice of the Arkansas Supreme Court
- Timothy Turner (1585–1677), chief justice of South Wales

== See also ==
- Judge Turner (disambiguation)
