= Robert Langdon (disambiguation) =

Robert Langdon is a fictional character created by Dan Brown. The character appears in the following series:

- Robert Langdon (novel series) by Dan Brown
- Robert Langdon (franchise) based on the novel series

Robert Langdon may also refer to:

- Robert Bruce Langdon (1826–1895), American businessman and politician
- Robert E. Langdon Jr. (1918–2004), American architect
- Robert Adrian Langdon, Australian academic

== See also ==
- Robert Langton (disambiguation)
