= Herman R. Beardsley =

American judge (1800–1878)

Herman R. Beardsley (July 21, 1800 – March 9, 1878) was a Vermont attorney and judge who served as an associate justice of the Vermont Supreme Court.

== Biography ==
Herman Ruggles Beardsley was born in Kent, Connecticut on July 21, 1800, the son of Ephraim Beardsley and Hannah (Berry) Beardsley. Ephraim Beradsley's family moved to Grand Isle, Vermont in the early 1800s, and his son was educated by private tutors, including Asa Lyon. He studied at the University of Vermont, and read law with Bates Turner, Asa Aldis, and John Smith of St. Albans. Beardsley was admitted to the bar in 1825, and practiced in St. Albans. In addition to serving in local offices including justice of the peace, in 1834, Beardsley was elected to Vermont's governor's council, and he served until 1835. In 1837, the University of Vermont awarded him the honorary degree of Master of Arts. Beardsley represented St. Albans in the Vermont House of Representatives in 1848.

In 1865, Beardsley was appointed to the Vermont Supreme Court, filling the Associate Justice's position left vacant by the resignation of Asa O. Aldis. He served for only a few months, and was not a candidate for appointment to a full term. He was succeeded on the court by William C. Wilson.

== Family ==
Beardsley was married to Abigail S. Webb (1808-1874), the stepdaughter of Bates Turner. They were the parents of three daughters and one son.

== Death and burial ==
Beardsley died in St. Albans on March 9, 1878. He was buried at Greenwood Cemetery in St. Albans.

== Sources ==
- Hemenway, Abby Maria (1871). The Vermont Historical Gazetteer. Vol. 2. Burlington, VT: A. M. Hemenway.
- Sowles, Edward A. (October 21, 1890). Memorial Sketch of Herman R. Beardsley in Proceedings of the Vermont Bar Association. Vol. II, 5. Barre, VT: Thomas H. Cave, Book and Job Printer.
- Thompson, Zadock (1842). History of Vermont, Natural, Civil and Statistical. Burlington, VT: Chauncey Goodrich.
- Ullery, Jacob G. (1894). Men of Vermont Illustrated. Brattleboro, VT: Transcript Publishing Company. p. 184.
- Vermont General Assembly (1834). Journal of the General Assembly of the State of Vermont. Rutland, VT: William Fay.
- Vermont General Assembly (1846). Journal of the General Assembly of the State of Vermont. Windsor, VT: Bishop & Tracy.

Political offices
Preceded by Asa O. Aldis	Associate Justice of the Vermont Supreme Court; 1865–1865	Succeeded by William C. Wilson
