= Aldis (name) =

- Gender: Male
- Name day: 22 November

Origin
- Region of origin: Latvia

Aldis is both a given name and surname. As a given name, it is predominantly a masculine Latvian name.

Notable people with the name include:

Given name

- Aldis Bernard (c. 1810 – 1876), Canadian politician and mayor of Montreal
- Aldis Bērziņš (born 1956), Latvian-American volleyball player and Olympic medalist
- Aldis Eglājs (born 1936), Latvian sailboat designer and builder
- Aldis Gobzems (born 1978), Latvian politician
- Aldis Hodge (born 1986), American film and television actor
- Aldis Intlers (1965–1994), Latvian bobsledder and Olympic competitor
- Aldis Kļaviņš (1975–2000), Latvian slalom canoeist and Olympic competitor
- Aldis Kušķis (born 1965), Latvian politician

Surname

- Aldis (surname)

== See also ==
- Aldis (disambiguation)
