= Greenwood Cemetery (St. Albans, Vermont) =

Cemetery in Franklin County, Vermont

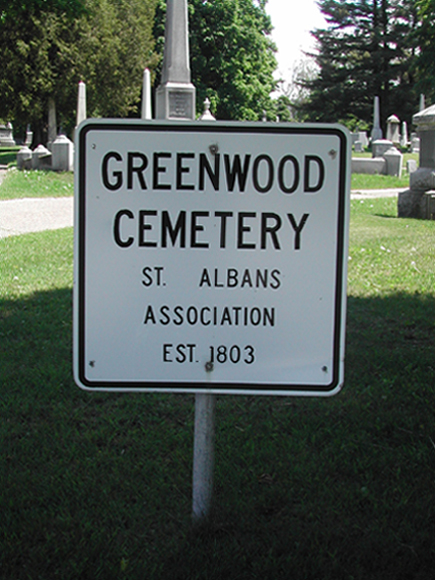
- Entrance sign, Greenwood Cemetery, St. Albans, Vermont

Details
- Established: 1802
- Location: St. Albans (city), Vermont
- Country: United States
- Coordinates: 44°48′10.8″N 73°5′6.36″W
- Owned by: St. Albans Cemetery Association
- Size: 22.7 acres
- No. of graves: Over 5,000
- Website: St. Albans Resources, Vermont Old Cemetery Association
- Find a Grave: Greenwood Cemetery

Greenwood Cemetery is a burial ground located in St. Albans (city), Vermont. The entrance is on South Main Street (U.S. Route 7), between St. Albans State Highway and Upper Gilman Street. The facility has been active since 1802, was formally established in 1803, and contains more than 5,000 graves. It is owned and operated by the St. Albans Cemetery Association.

== History ==
Greenwood Cemetery's oldest graves date from 1802. Burials include an individual who took part in the Boston Tea Party, veterans of the American Revolutionary War and American Civil War, and many individuals prominent in government and politics, business, and literature.

== Description ==
Greenwood Cemetery is long and narrow, with graves generally arranged in a linear fashion. It measures approximately 2200 feet long and about 450 feet wide.

== Notable burials ==
- Asa Aldis, chief justice of the Vermont Supreme Court
- Asa O. Aldis, associate justice of the Vermont Supreme Court and diplomat
- Bradley Barlow, U.S. congressman
- Herman R. Beardsley, associate justice of the Vermont Supreme Court
- Jeptha Bradley, Vermont Auditor of Accounts
- Lawrence Brainerd, U.S. senator
- Alexander Burgess, Episcopal bishop
- Stephen S. Cushing, associate justice of the Vermont Supreme Court
- Frank L. Greene, U.S. senator
- Walter F. Scott, Vermont State Treasurer
- Ann Eliza Smith, author
- Edward Curtis Smith, governor of Vermont
- John Smith, U.S. congressman
- J. Gregory Smith, governor of Vermont
- Worthington Curtis Smith, U.S. congressman
- Orlando Stevens, state legislator in Vermont and Minnesota
- Farrand Stewart Stranahan, lieutenant governor of Vermont
- Benjamin Swift, U.S. senator
- Bates Turner, associate justice of the Vermont Supreme Court
- Augustus Young, U.S. congressman
