= Daniel Owen (judge) =

American judge (1732–1812)

Deputy and Lieutenant Governor of the State of Rhode Island
- In office May, 1786 – May, 1790
- Preceded by: Jabez Bowen
- Succeeded by: Samuel J. Potter

26th Chief Justice of the Rhode Island Supreme Court
- In office May 1791 – June 1795
- Preceded by: Othniel Gorton
- Succeeded by: Peleg Arnold

Personal details
- Born: 1732; Providence, Rhode Island
- Died: October 21, 1812 (aged 79–80); Gloucester, Rhode Island
- Political party: Pro-Administration
- Relations: Asa Aldis (son in law); Asa O. Aldis (grandson)

Daniel Owen (1732 – October 21, 1812) was a politician and judge in the state of Rhode Island. He served as lieutenant governor of the State of Rhode Island from May 1786 to May 1790, and was an associate justice of the Rhode Island Supreme Court from May 1790 to May 1791, and Chief Justice from May 1791 to June 1795.

Born in Providence, Rhode Island, Owen was the son of Thomas Owen, who had been a deputy of the general assembly of Rhode Island in 1770, and assistant deputy to Governor Stephen Hopkins. Owen settled in Glocester, Rhode Island, where he was "admitted a freeman" in May 1757.

According to The National Cyclopedia of American Biography:

He was a deputy to the general assembly in 1775–76; was a member and president of the convention which met at Newport in May, 1790, and adopted the constitution of the United States, and held several other important positions of honor and trust, among them being that of chief justice of the state of Rhode Island (1791–95). He was deputy governor in 1786–90, and was one of the five citizens who, in 1786, petitioned the general assembly for the "exclusive privilege" of a coinage for the colony of Rhode Island for the period of twelve years, which petition was granted in January, 1787. Judge Owen was a large land-holder in northern Vermont, and on October 20, 1781, he, with William Barton, received the grant of the town of Barton, in Vermont. Iron ore was found on his farm near Gloucester, and he carried on a considerable business in the iron trade with other parts of the country and with England. He was married to Hannah Angell. Aug. 15, 1756. He died at Gloucester, R. I., in 1812.

Owen's children included daughter Amey; she was the wife of first William Gadcomb, and then Asa Aldis, who served as chief justice of the Vermont Supreme Court. Her daughter with Gadcomb, Fidelia, was the wife of Senator Lawrence Brainerd. Her son with Aldis, Asa O. Aldis, also served on the Vermont Supreme Court.
