= Samuel Whiting Jr. =

American clergyman (1633–1713)

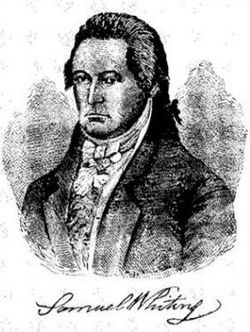
Rev Samuel Whiting Jr.

The Reverend Samuel Whiting Jr. (1633–1713) was Billerica's first settled minister, serving in that role for 50 years. This longevity gave him a major role in shaping the town's early moral, religious, and civic life.

== Career ==
The Rev. Samuel Whiting Jr. graduated from Harvard in 1653. His father Rev. Samuel Whiting Snr. had written Oratio Quam Comitijs Cantabrigiensibus Americanis Peroravit reverendissimus D.D. Samuel Whiting Pastor Linnensis; in aula sci-licet Harvardina in 1649 as an opening address at Harvard University to celebrate its success. While some sources indicate Whiting Jr. had a brother, Nathaniel, this is in error. In his father's memoir, it is clear he had no son named Nathaniel.

Samuel Whiting Jr.'s student/assistant for one year was Samuel Ruggles, who succeeded him as Billerica's next pastor. Ruggles married Whiting Jr.'s daughter, Elizabeth on 19 December 1710.

== Family and early life ==
Coat of Arms of Whiting family

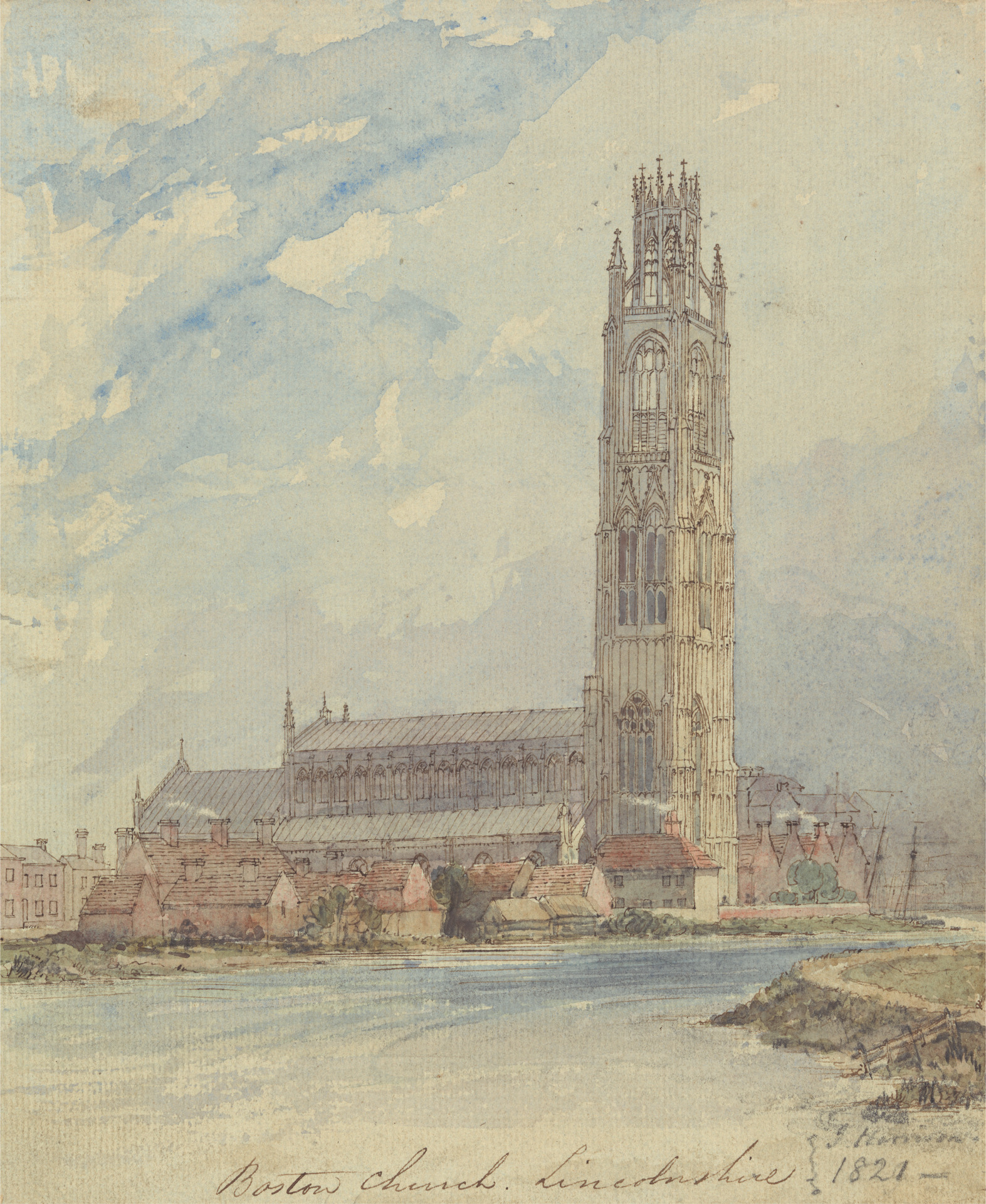
St Botolph's Church, Boston, Lincolnshire, where the Whiting and Skepper families worshipped

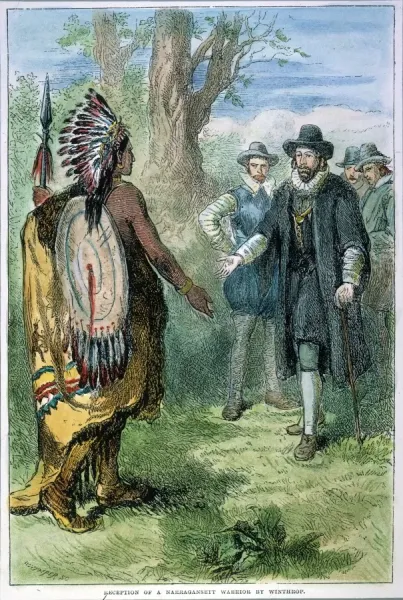
The Rev. Samuel Whiting Snr. stands behind (far right) of Governor John Winthrop (foreground) who meets with a Narragansett Native American warrior, c. 1639. The Rev. Skipper is behind Winthrop to the left.

=== Puritanism ===
The Rev Samuel Whiting Jr. was born on 25 March 1633 in Skirbeck, Lincolnshire, England. He was the son of a Puritan, the Reverend Samuel Whiting Snr. (1597-1679) and his second wife, Elizabeth St. John. Elizabeth belonged to the prominent landowning family of St. John of Lydiard Tregoze; she was the sister of Sir Oliver St. John, a man from a Puritan background and a leading lawyer and judge who was one of the foremost opponents of King Charles I of England during the English Civil War.

=== England ===
The Rev. Samuel Whiting (Samuel Whiting Snr.) was from Boston, Lincolnshire in England, himself the son of John Whiting, Mayor of Boston. The will of Mayor Whiting, father of Samuel Snr., recorded in the parish register of St. Botolph's Church, Boston, Lincolnshire in England, is dated 20 Oct 1617. The parents of the Rev. William Skepper – who would study at Cambridge University with Whiting Snr. and sail in 1638 to join the Boston settlement before moving to nearby Lynn – were married in England in the Whiting family church, St Botolph's, on 11 August 1592. From 1630 to 1638, Rev. Skepper was the Church of England rector at Thorpe St Peter, Lincolnshire (also known as "Thorpe in the Marsh"), when the Whiting family were still prevalent in this area: both John and Robert Whiting of Thorpe, near Wainfleet, are recorded as living in the parish in 1560 in William Whiting's publication: Memoir of Rev. Samuel Whiting, D.D., and of his wife, Elizabeth St. John, with references to some of their English ancestors and American descendants.

==== Cambridge University, holy orders, marriage ====
Sharing the same age, Whiting Snr. and the Rev William Skepper continued their friendship from their St Botolph's days through to university. The Rev. Skepper received holy orders after completing his B.A. degree at the Puritan-focused Sidney Sussex College (1618). Similarly, Whiting Snr. received his B.A. and Master of Arts degrees from Cambridge University's other Puritan college - Emmanuel (1618 and 1620) and proceeded to take holy orders.

Whiting Snr. was married at Boston, on 6 August 1629 at St Botolph's Church to his second wife, Elizabeth, sister of Rt. Hon. Sir Oliver St. John. St John was later chief justice of England and one of the leaders of the Parliamentary opposition to King Charles I of England.

=== Massachusetts Bay Colony ===
The Rev. Samuel Whiting Snr. travelled from King's Lynn England to Boston, arriving there on May 26, 1636 where his presence was officially recorded by the colony's governor, John Winthrop. Whiting Snr. lived in Boston – the colony's "hub" – for six months before moving to Lynn, Massachusetts where the residents soon changed the name of their settlement in his honour. Whiting's assistants were his neighbour Rev. Thomas Cobbett and the Rev. William Skipper/Skepper of Lynn who had been his contemporary at Cambridge University; Skepper studying at Sidney Sussex, the university's other Puritan college. As with Whiting, both Cobbett and Skepper had Lincolnshire connections - Cobbett had "first settled in the ministry at a small place in Lincolnshire". Lincolnshire man Skepper also assisted Cobbett at the church in Lynn, Massachusetts.

Once settled in Lynn, the Rev. Samuel Whiting Snr. established his home with his wife and two children across from the settlement's meetinghouse. Their garden was known by the community for its variety of fruit and vegetables, and for the apple cider produced by its trees. He also was given 200 acres of land in 1638. He was greatly respected by his community, and was "peculiarly amiable." When among groups of people, he would "kiss all the maids" and "he felt all the better for it." They were said to "hug their arms around his neck and kiss him right back." Whiting Snr. was described as being "a man of middle size and straight fine hair". He attempted to communicate with - and likely convert - the Native Americans. In the 1640s, he took an Indian girl into his household given over by her mother. He gave her an education and she became a part of his family, but eight years later, she ran away back to her tribe. Whiting Snr. was said to be heartbroken when she left. He was a colleague of the Rev. John Cotton who was the pastor at the First Church in Boston from 1633 until 1652. Whiting Snr. had first lived with Cotton's friend Atherton Haugh/Hough (c. 1593 - 1650) upon his arrival in Boston, Massachusetts in 1633. Haugh had travelled to Massachusetts Bay Colony on the same ship - the Griffin - as Cotton and had been Mayor of Boston, England, in 1628, so he was familiar with government affairs, as too was Whiting Snr., whose father had also been a Mayor of Boston in Lincolnshire, England.

=== Family's relationship with Oliver Cromwell ===
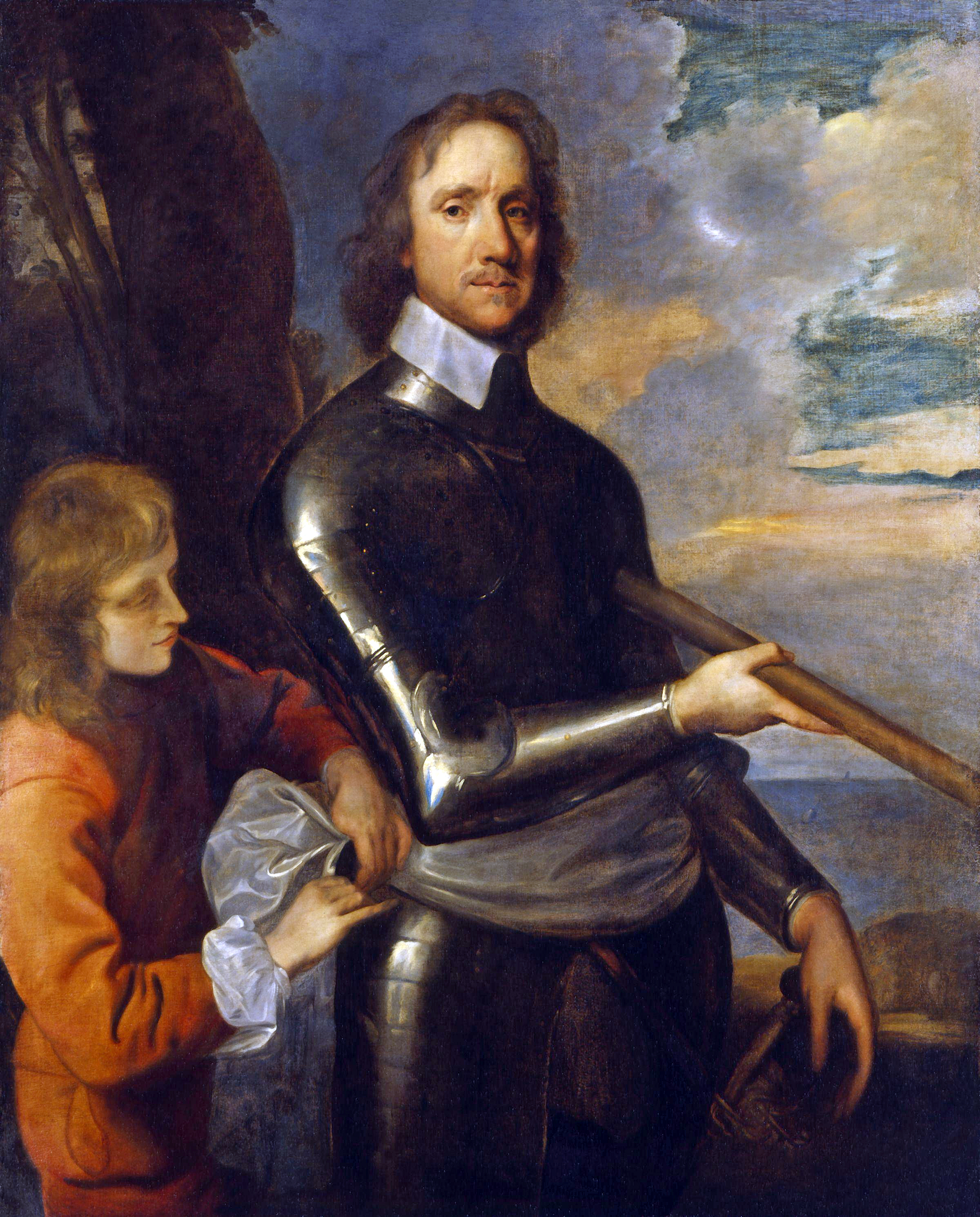
In 1650, Rev. Samuel Whiting Snr.'s distant relative Oliver Cromwell (pictured) asked Whiting to go to Ireland to convert the Catholics to Puritanism.

The Rev. Samuel Whiting Snr. came over to Boston, Massachusetts, on the same ship as his Cambridge contemporary John Wheelwright who, like Whiting Snr. was also a Puritan minister. Wheelwright was banished from the Massachusetts General Court on November 3, 1637. Wheelwright knew Whiting Snr. from Cambridge as well as the Rev. William Skipper and Oliver Cromwell, both of whom he had been in residence with at Cambridge's Sidney Sussex College. Wheelwright returned to England where, by the 1650s, he was received by Oliver Cromwell, by this time known as His Highness Lord Protector of the Commonwealth of England, Scotland and Ireland. Whiting Snr. and Cromwell were distantly related: Whiting's second wife, Elizabeth, was the sister of Sir Oliver St. John, whose second wife, Elizabeth Cromwell, was the first cousin of Cromwell.

In 1650, Cromwell wrote to Whiting Snr. and his Lynn friend, the Rev. Thomas Cobbett, asking them to go to Ireland to encourage the Protestants to embrace Puritanism. Whiting Snr. wrote back to Cromwell in January 1651, humbly thanking him for his "offers" and "promising to embrace the same." However, nothing came of their plans.

== Marriage and death ==
The Rev. Samuel Whiting Jr. married Dorcas Chester on 12 November 1656, in Salem, Essex, Massachusetts. They were the parents of at least 8 sons and 4 daughters, including Elizabeth. He lived in Hartford, Connecticut Colony in 1656 and Massachusetts Bay Colony, in 1656. In 1663, at the age of 30, he was an ordained minister in Billerica and died on 28 February 1713, in Billerica, at the age of 79. He was buried in Billerica.

Preceded by First Pastor	Minister; 1663 – 1713	Succeeded by Samuel Ruggles
