= Southern Claims Commission =

Defunct agency of the US government

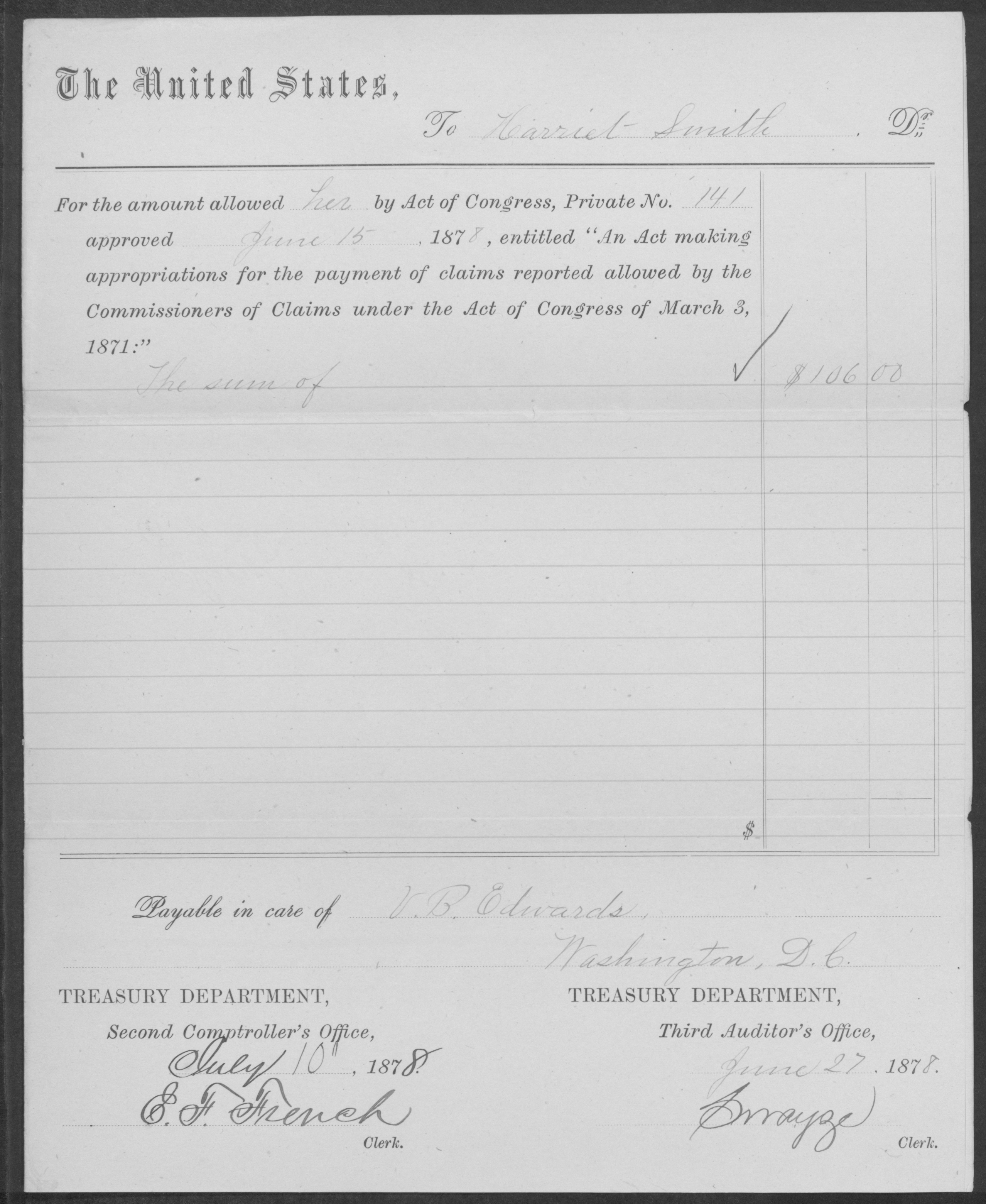
A claims application from South Carolina in the collections of the National Archives and Records Administration

The Southern Claims Commission (SCC) was an organization of the executive branch of the United States government from 1871 to 1880, created under President Ulysses S. Grant by Congress on March 3, 1871. Its purpose was to allow Union sympathizers who had lived in the Southern states during the American Civil War, 1861–1865, to apply for reimbursements for property losses due to U.S. Army confiscations during the war. An 1872 act additionally authorized U.S. Navy claims.

== Application process ==
Southerners from 12 states (West Virginia, Virginia, North Carolina, South Carolina, Georgia, Florida, Tennessee, Alabama, Mississippi, Louisiana, Arkansas, and Texas) filed claims with the Southern Claims Commission from 1871 to 1873 if they:

1. were loyal to the United States during the Civil War
2. had supplies officially taken by or furnished to the U.S. Army in the war

Southern Loyalists (those who were Union sympathizers) made 22,298 claims. Only 32 percent of the claims (7,092) were approved for payment. The claimants used the testimony of their neighbors as evidence of their U.S. loyalty and property losses. The applications of claimants (successful or not), testimony, and the SCC papers provide excellent historical background information about Southern life during the Civil War.

=== Required records ===
Although only a few people per county qualified for a settlement, the application papers of the Southern Claims Commission typically include questions mentioning hundreds of their neighbors. Neighbors of all races, and classes were questioned and discussed in SCC records, potentially including:

- personal descriptions, and accounts of events during the war
- military records of claimants, or their relatives
- letters, diaries, and family Bible records
- wills, property inventories, and probate records

=== Example claim ===
In one such account, following the Battle of Antietam and during the winter of 1862–1863, a brigade of General William B. Franklin's VI Corps, totaling about 3,000 troops, camped on the 273 acres (110 ha) New Baltimore, Virginia farm of Julia F. Claggett along the Warrenton Turnpike and Georgetown Road. The soldiers appropriated food stores and supplies, seized horses, pigs, and cattle, cut down 40 acres (16 ha) of woodland, tore down barns and fences for fuel and torched what remained. E. C. Weaver, formerly an Orderly Sergeant in Company K, 121st New York Vols., Bartletts Brigade, had been present. He testified to the Commission:

I think she was generally regarded as a union woman by the citizens as well as by the army. My reasons for thinking so are that orders were given for the troops to protect her property and especially a field of corn then growing and the fences around it, because she was a union woman. She was regarded and spoken of by the Soldiers as a union woman and was treated as one by the Brigade. Orders were given at first not to burn her rails; and wood was hauled to supply the troops. Afterwards the wood gave out and the rails were taken and hauled to the company streets in U.S. Army wagons.

Julia Claggett filed a claim valued at $7,322.50 ($196,779 in 2025) with the Southern Claims Commission in 1871. They allowed her only $3,091 ($83,071). She still owed the prior owner Joseph Horner $8063.57 (about $196,779) and she was forced to sell the farm at a loss to Gustavus Richard Brown Horner, her deceased husband's cousin.

== Structure ==
The organization was headed by three presidentially appointed commissioners:

- Asa O. Aldis (president)
- Orange Ferriss
- James B. Howell
