= William C. Wilson (judge) =

American judge (1812–1882)

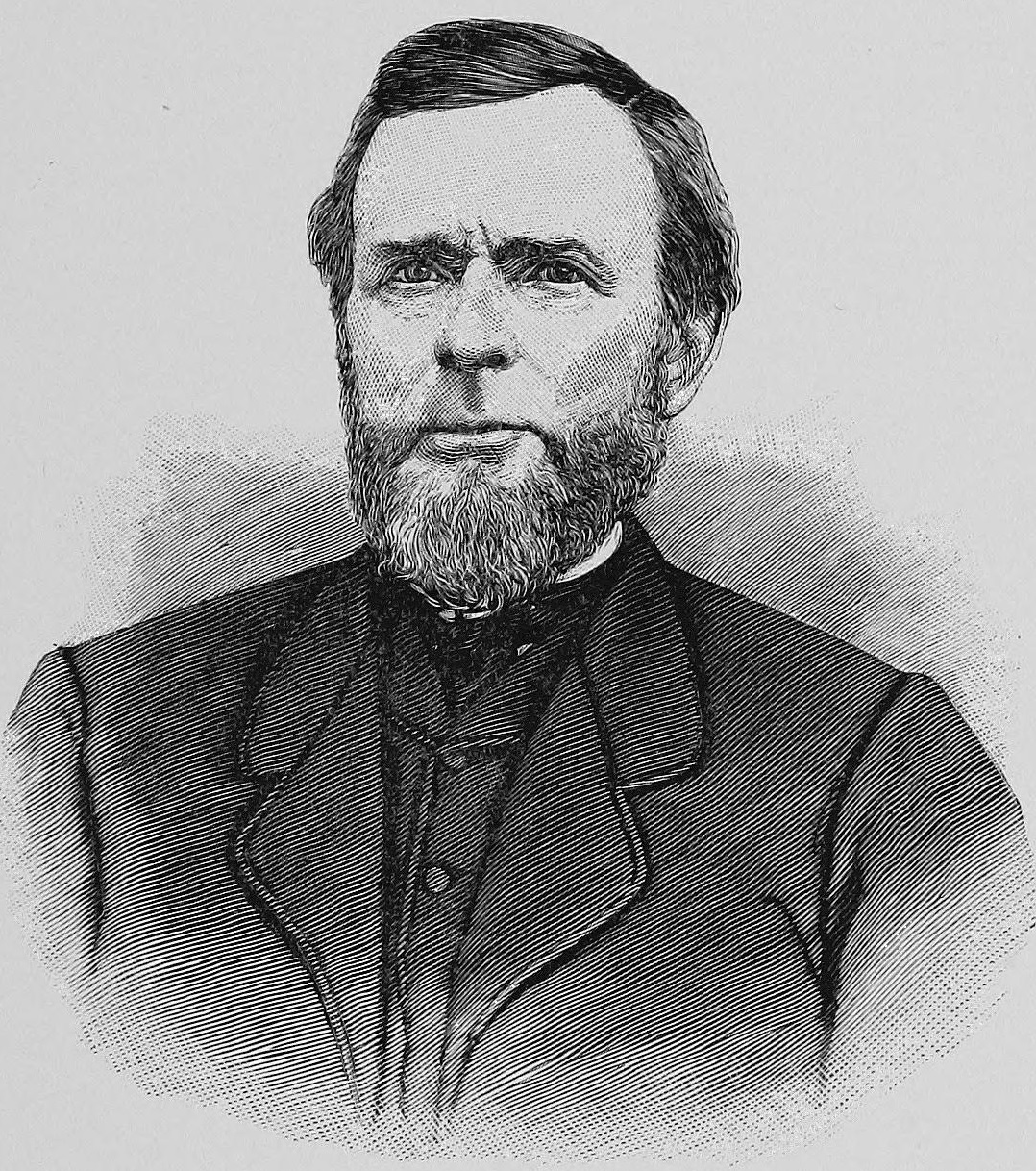
From 1891's History of Franklin and Grand isle Counties

William C. Wilson (July 2, 1812 – April 16, 1882) was a Vermont lawyer and judge who served as an associate justice of the Vermont Supreme Court from 1865 to 1869.

== Biography ==
William Campbell Wilson was born in Cambridge, Vermont on July 2, 1812, the son of Jennett (Campbell) Wilson (1784-1846) and farmer John Wilson (1779-1830). William Wilson was educated in the local schools of Cambridge and Jericho, and worked on the family farm until he was eighteen, after which he began teaching school and studying law. He studied under Levi Joslyn in Cambridge, followed by study with Homer E. Hubbell of Fairfax, and then Bates Turner of St. Albans. He was admitted to the bar in 1834, and practiced in Bakersfield, where he also operated a school for prospective attorneys, which trained between 80 and 100 students during the years it was in existence. Wilson was also a town leader, and played a key role in the creation of Bakersfield's hotel and Methodist church, as well as the Bakersfield North Academy school.

Originally a Whig, and a Republican after the party's founding in the mid-1850s, Wilson was a delegate to the 1843 state constitutional convention, and served as Franklin County's State's Attorney from 1844 to 1845. He served in the Vermont Senate from 1848 to 1849, and was an assistant judge of the Franklin County Court from 1849 to 1851. In 1850, he was again a delegate to the state constitutional convention. Wilson received the honorary degree of Master of Arts from the University of Vermont in 1853. In 1855, Wilson served on the Council of Censors, the body which met every seven years to review actions of the state government and ensure their constitutionality. In 1860, Wilson was an alternate delegate to the Republican National Convention. From 1863 to 1865, Wilson represented Bakersfield in the Vermont House of Representatives.

In 1865, Wilson was appointed as an associate justice of the Vermont Supreme Court, and he served until 1869. His first wife died in 1869, and after resigning from the court, Wilson moved to Rochester, Minnesota to live near his daughters. While living in Minnesota, Wilson remarried and began authoring a book on legal topics, but failing health caused him to discontinue the effort. In his later years, breathing problems in cold weather caused him to spend winters in Florida.

== Death and burial ==
Wilson died in Rochester, Minnesota on April 16, 1882. He was buried at Maple Grove Cemetery in Bakersfield.

== Family ==
In 1835, Wilson was married to Clarissa Ann Partridge Pratt (1817-1869) of Bakersfield. They were the parents of a son and two daughters: William DeForest Wilson (1836-1900), an attorney in St. Albans, Vermont; Elizabeth (1837-1926), the wife of attorney and judge Milton R. Tyler (1835-1907); and Clara (1843-1924), the wife of Judge Charles Monroe Start (1839-1919). In 1872, Wilson married Mary Ann Brown of Rochester, Minnesota. They remained married until her death in 1875.

== Sources ==
=== Books ===
- Aldrich, Lewis Cass (1891). History of Franklin and Grand Isle Counties. Syracuse, NY: D. Mason & Co.
- Baldwin, Frank W. (1894). Memorial Sketch, Hon. William C. Wilson, Published in the 1892 Annual Meeting Proceedings of the Vermont Bar Association. Vol. III, 2. Montpelier, VT: Argus and Patriot Co.
- Daughters of the American Revolution (1914). Lineage Book, National Society of the Daughters of the American Revolution. Vol. 39. Harrisburg, PA: Telegraph Printing Company.
- Dodge, Prentiss Cutler (1912). Encyclopedia of Vermont Biography. Burlington, VT: Ullery Publishing Company.
- Ullery, Jacob G. (1894). Men of Vermont Illustrated. Brattleboro, VT: Transcript Publishing Company.
- University of Vermont (1901). General Catalogue of the University of Vermont, 1791-1900. Burlington, VT: Free Press Association.

=== Newspapers ===
- "Franklin County Whig Convention". Vermont Watchman and State Journal. Montpelier, VT. August 7, 1837.
- "Delegates to Chicago and Charleston: Vermont Republican State Convention". New York Times. New York, NY. April 5, 1860.
- "Death Notice, Mary Ann Brown Wilson". St. Albans Daily Messenger. St. Albans, VT. September 17, 1875 – via Newspapers.com.
- "Death of Hon. William C. Wilson". St. Albans Daily Messenger. St. Albans, VT. April 17, 1882.

=== Internet ===
- Bakersfield (Vermont politician) Town Clerk (March 18, 1862). "Vermont Vital Records, 1720-1908, Marriage Record for Milton R. Tyler and Elizabeth J. Wilson". Ancestry.com. Provo, UT: Ancestry.com, LLC.
- Vermont State Archives and Records Administration (2017). "Justices of the Vermont Supreme Court, 1778 – Present" (PDF). www.sec.state.vt.us. Montpelier, VT: Vermont Secretary of State.

Political offices
Preceded by Herman R. Beardsley	Justice of the Vermont Supreme Court; 1865–1869	Succeeded by Homer E. Royce
