= Robert Langton =

Robert Langton may refer to:

- Robert Langton (footballer) (1918–1996)
- Robert Langton (MP) for Newton (UK Parliament constituency)

== See also ==
- Robert Langdon (disambiguation)
