= Judge Turner =

Judge Turner may refer to:

- Bolon B. Turner (1897–1987), judge of the United States Tax Court
- Ezekiel B. Turner (1825–1888), judge of the United States District Court for the Western District of Texas
- James T. Turner (born 1938), judge of the United States Claims Court
- Jerome Turner (1942–2000), judge of the United States District Court for the Western District of Tennessee

== See also ==
- Justice Turner (disambiguation)
