= Brooksville Advent Church =

Historic church in Vermont, United States

- Formerly listed on the U.S. National Register of Historic Places
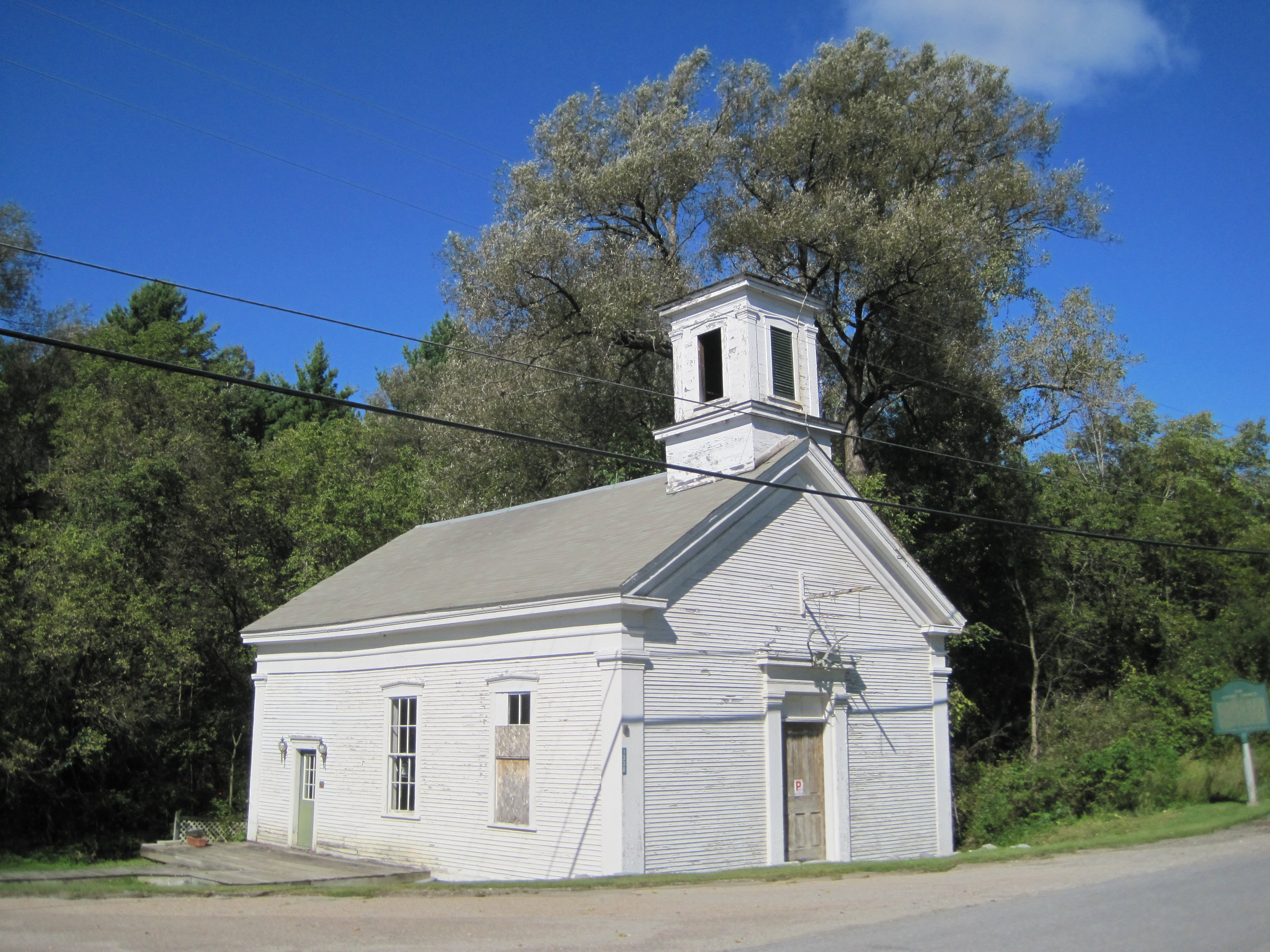

- Location within Vermont Location within the United States
- Location: 1338 Dog Team Rd., New Haven, Vermont
- Coordinates: 44°3′53″N 73°10′23″W
- Area: 5.1 acres (2.1 ha)
- Built: 1857
- Architectural style: Colonial Revival
- MPS: Religious Buildings, Sites and Structures in Vermont MPS
- NRHP reference No.: 02001380

Significant dates
- Added to NRHP: November 21, 2002
- Removed from NRHP: March 22, 2016

Brooksville Advent Church is a historic church at 1338 Dog Team Road in New Haven, Vermont.

It was built in 1837 and added to the National Register of Historic Places in 2002. It was delisted in 2016.
