= John Elderkin =

John Elderkin was a colonial American carpenter who built mills, meetinghouses, and wharves around New England.

== Mother Brook ==
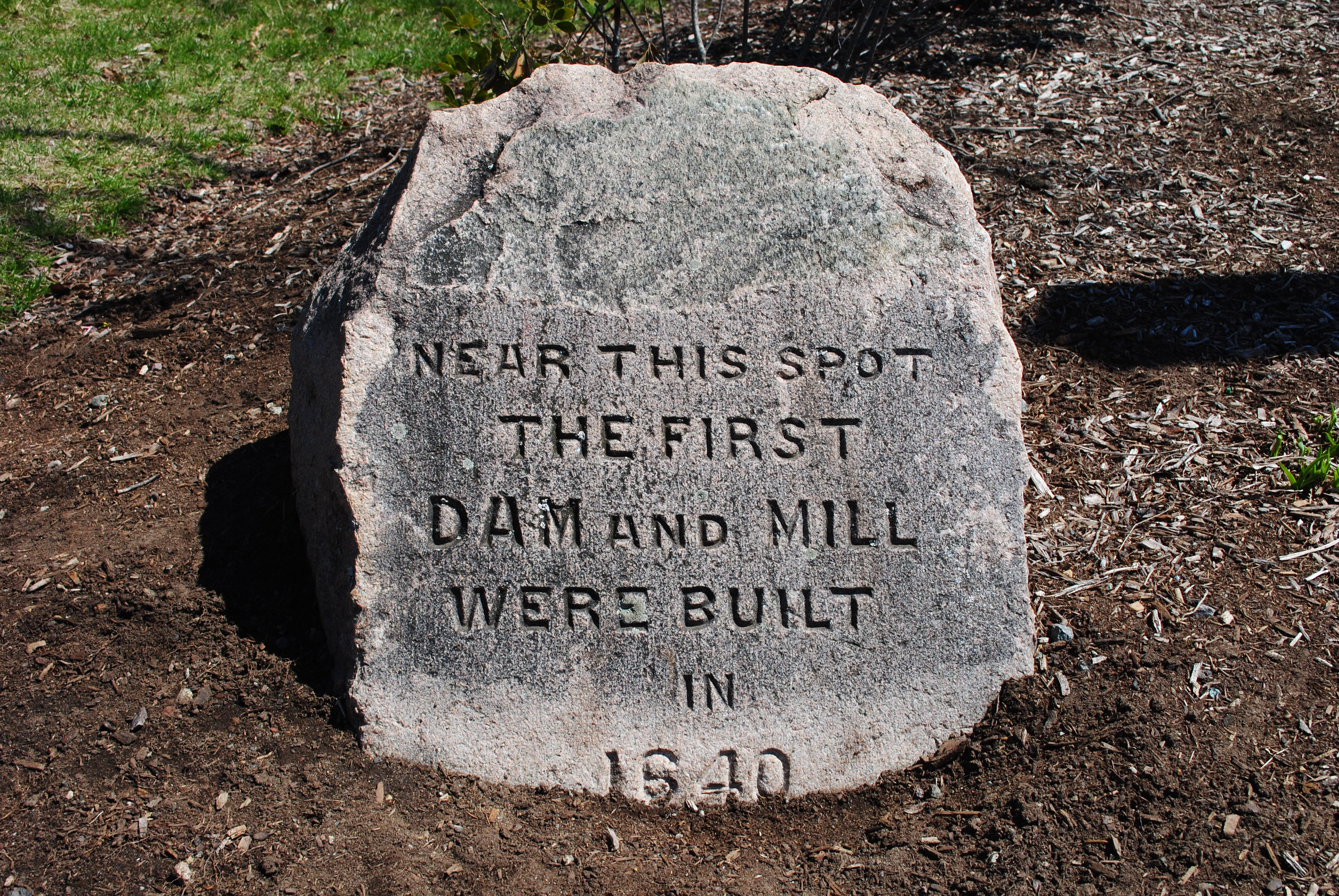
A stone from 1886 marking the location of the first mill built on Mother Brook

While both the Charles River and the Neponset River ran through Dedham, Massachusetts and close by to one another, both were slow-moving and could not power a mill. With an elevation difference of 40 feet (12 m) between the two, however, a canal connecting them would be swift-moving. In 1639 the town ordered that a 4000-foot ditch be dug between the two so that one third of the Charles' water would flow down what would become known as Mother Brook and into the Neponset.

The town also offered an incentive of 60 acres of land to whoever would construct and maintain a corn mill, as long as the mill was ready to grind corn by "the first of the 10th month"[i.e. December]. (Note: Before the adaptation of the Gregorian calendar in the United States, the year did not begin in January.) Abraham Shaw would begin construction of the first dam and mill on the Brook in 1641, but he died in 1638 before he could complete his mill, and his heirs were not interested in building the mill.

Elderkin, who recently arrived in Dedham from Lynn, built a dam on East Brook next to the present-day Condon Park and near the intersection of Bussey St and Colburn St. This was the first public utility in the nation.

Elderkin was given 3 acres of land next to the Brook in return. Elderkin was in high demand as a skilled builder and, in 1642, only months after opening the mill, moved out of town. In 1642, Elderkin sold half of his rights to Nathaniel Whiting and the other half to John Allin, Nathan Aldis, and John Dwight. (Note: Allin was the minister, Aldis the deacon, and Dwight was Whiting's father-in-law.)

== New London ==
Elderkin was one of six men hired by John Winthrop the Younger to build New London, Connecticut's first mill in 1650. He was paid 20 pounds for his labor. (Note: One of the other men was Mathew Waller.) He also built the first church there.

== Works cited ==
- Abbott, Katharine M. (1903). Old Paths And Legends Of New England (PDF). New York: The Knickerbocker Press. pp. 290–297.
- Hanson, Robert Brand (1976). Dedham, Massachusetts, 1635-1890. Dedham Historical Society.
- Neiswander, Judith (2024). Mother Brook and the Mills of East Dedham. Damianos Publishing. ISBN 978-1-941573-66-2.
- Worthington, Erastus (1900). Historical sketch of Mother Brook, Dedham, Mass: compiled from various records and papers, showing the diversion of a portion of the Charles River into the Neponset River and the manufactures on the stream, from 1639 to 1900. Dedham, MA: C.G. Wheeler.
