= Altis (disambiguation) =

Altis was the original name of the ancient Greek religious sanctuary of Olympia, Greece.

Altis or ALTIS may also refer to:

- Altis Semiconductor, an independent French company
- ALTIS – Postgraduate School Business & Society, the business school of Università Cattolica del Sacro Cuore in Milan, Italy
- Toyota Camry, a car, also known as the Daihatsu Altis
- Toyota Corolla, a car, also known as the Toyota Corolla Altis
- Altis, a fictional country in the 2013 video game Arma 3, based on Lemnos, Greece

== See also ==
- Dismorphia altis, a butterfly in the family Pieridae
- Alti, a fictional character in the 1995–2001 fantasy television series Xena: Warrior Princess
