= Waupun (town), Wisconsin =

Town in Fond du Lac County, Wisconsin, United States

Waupun, Wisconsin
- Town
- Town of Waupun
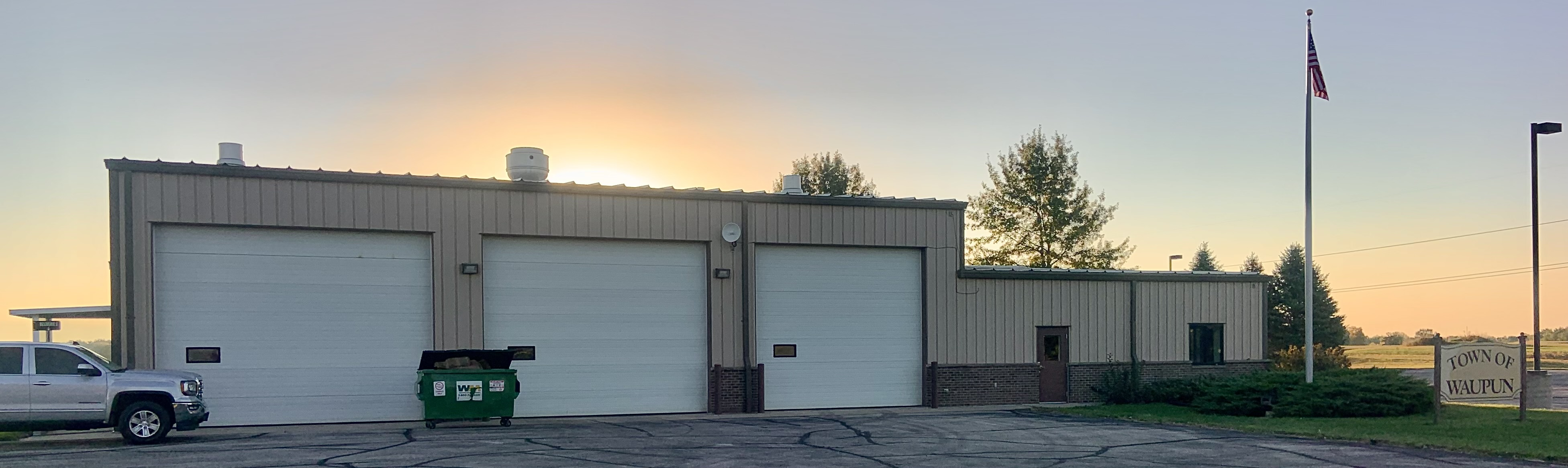
- Waupun Town Hall

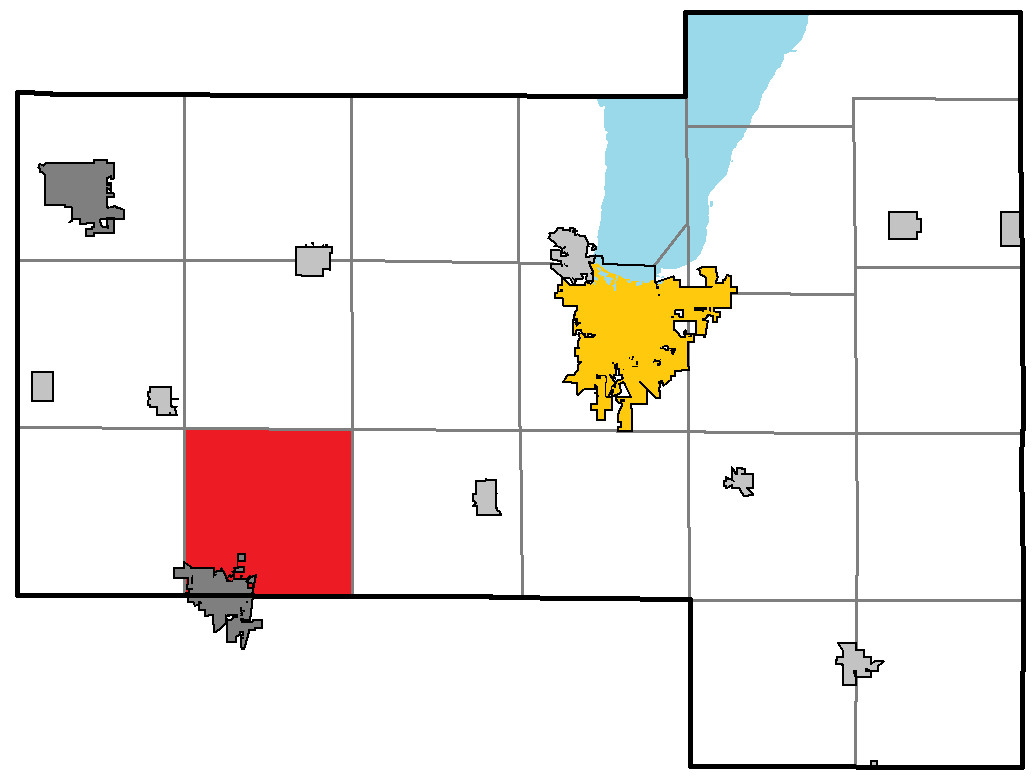
- Location of Waupun, within Fond du Lac County
- Coordinates: 43.63332°N 88.72955°W
- Country: United States
- State: Wisconsin
- County: Fond du Lac

Area
  - Total: 34.3 sq mi (89 km^{2})
  - Land: 33.99 sq mi (88.0 km^{2})
  - Water: 0.30 sq mi (0.78 km^{2})

Population (2020)
  - Total: 1,373
  - Density: 40.39/sq mi (15.60/km^{2})
- Time zone: UTC-6 (Central (CST))
  - Summer (DST): UTC-5 (CDT)
- Area code(s): 920 & 274
- GNIS feature ID: 1584378

Waupun is a town in Fond du Lac County, Wisconsin, United States. The population was 1,373 at the 2020 census. The town abuts the city of Waupun. The unincorporated community of Ladoga is also located partially in the town.

== Geography ==
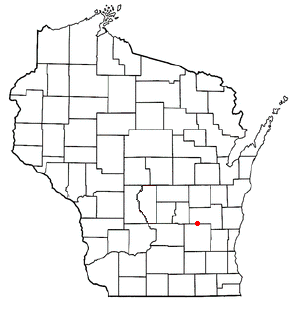
Location of Waupun, Wisconsin

According to the United States Census Bureau, the town has a total area of 35.0 square miles (90.6 km^{2}), all land.

== Demographics ==
At the 2000 census there were 1,385 people, 472 households, and 407 families living in the town. The population density was 39.6 people per square mile (15.3/km^{2}). There were 495 housing units at an average density of 14.2/sq mi (5.5/km^{2}). The racial makeup of the town was 98.19% White, 0.22% African American, 0.22% Asian, 1.01% from other races, and 0.36% from two or more races. Hispanic or Latino of any race were 1.08%.

Of the 472 households 40.9% had children under the age of 18 living with them, 80.1% were married couples living together, 3.4% had a female householder with no husband present, and 13.6% were non-families. 11.0% of households were one person and 5.5% were one person aged 65 or older. The average household size was 2.93 and the average family size was 3.18.

The age distribution was 29.0% under the age of 18, 6.8% from 18 to 24, 29.6% from 25 to 44, 23.2% from 45 to 64, and 11.5% 65 or older. The median age was 37 years. For every 100 females, there were 110.5 males. For every 100 females age 18 and over, there were 108.5 males.

The median household income was $55,071 and the median family income was $56,926. Males had a median income of $36,094 versus $23,313 for females. The per capita income for the town was $20,641. About 2.2% of families and 2.1% of the population were below the poverty line, including 1.0% of those under the age of 18 and 7.5% of those 65 and older.

== Notable people ==
- Frank L. Bacon, farmer, businessman, and politician, lived in the town
- Wolcott Turner Brooks, farmer and politician, lived in the town
