= Wolcott Turner Brooks =

American politician

Wolcott Turner Brooks (October 6, 1826 – April 26, 1901) was a member of the Wisconsin State Assembly.

== Biography ==
Brooks was born on October 6, 1826, in New Haven, Vermont. He was a relative of the Michigan Supreme Court Justice Josiah Turner, and the Vermont House of Representatives member and Vermont Supreme Court Justice Bates Turner. Eventually, he moved to Fond du Lac County, then in the Wisconsin Territory. On May 31, 1853, Brooks married Gertrude Sanderson. They had two children. Brooks and his wife briefly lived in Fond du Lac town, before moving to Byron, Fond du Lac County, Wisconsin. In 1864, they settled in Waupun, Wisconsin, where Brooks was a farmer.

== Political career ==
Brooks was a member of the Assembly in 1860 and 1877. Additionally, he was chairman (similar to Mayor), Supervisor, Assessor and Treasurer of Waupun, as well as Supervisor of Byron. He was a Republican.
