= Nathaniel Whiting (mill owner) =

Nathaniel Whiting (1609 -January 15, 1682–3) was an early settler of Dedham, Massachusetts. He owned several mills on Mother Brook and is said to have dug the canal, the first man-made water way in America.

== Personal life ==
Whiting was born in England in 1609 to Samuel and Sarah (née Smith) Whiting. His mother's family came from Hoxden, Middlesex. He was in Watertown in 1635 and moved to Dedham in 1636. In 1638, he was granted 10 acres of land in Lynn, Massachusetts. Some sources have indicated he had a brother named Samuel, and claim that Samuel to be Rev. Samuel Whiting Jr. However, Rev. Whiting Jr's father's memoirs clearly demonstrate that Rev. Samuel Whiting Jr. had no brother named Nathaniel.

Whiting married Hannah Dwight, the daughter of John Dwight. They were married on March 4, 1643. Together they had 14 children, of whom 10 lived long enough to have families of their own. He had a son named Timothy. Through marriage he was related to James Draper.

He joined the First Church and Parish in Dedham in 1641 (Note: One source has the date at July 30, and another has it as May 30.) and was a signatory to the Dedham Covenant. He was made a freeman on May 18, 1642. Dedham was founded as a Utopian commune, but Fairbanks did not do his fair share of the work. He regularly neglected his share of road maintenance, for example, and he was often absent from town meetings.

Whiting died January 15, 1682. The inventory of his estate came to £489.07.06. Hannah ran the mill following Whiting's death.

== Digging of Mother Brook ==
Dedham, Massachusetts was first settled in 1635 and incorporated in 1636. The settlers needed a mill for grinding corn as hand mills took too much effort. By the late 1630s, the closest watermill was in Watertown, some distance away.

Although the initial settlement was adjacent to the Charles, in this vicinity it is slow-moving, with little elevation change that could provide power for a water wheel. A small stream, then called East Brook, ran close by the Charles River and emptied into the Neponset River. East Brook had an elevation change of more than 40 feet on its 3.5 mile run from near the early Dedham settlement to the Neponset River, which was sufficient to drive a water mill. However, East Brook had a low water flow insufficient to power a mill.

A committee was formed and "an audacious plan" was devised to "divert some of the plentiful water from the placid Charles into the steep but scarce East Brook. The 4,000 foot ditch was ordered to be dug at public expense by the Town on March 25, 1639, (Note: "Ordered yt a Ditch shalbe made at a comon charge thrugh purchashed medowe unto ye East brooke yt may bother be a ptieon fence in ye same; as also may serve for a course unto a water mille; yt it shall be found fitting to set a mille upon ye sayd brooke by ye judgement of a workman for yt purpose.") and a tax was levied on settlers to pay for it. The town was so confident in this course of action that the work began before they found a miller. There is no record of who dug it or how long it took, although Whiting family history claims it was done by Whiting.

== Mill owner ==
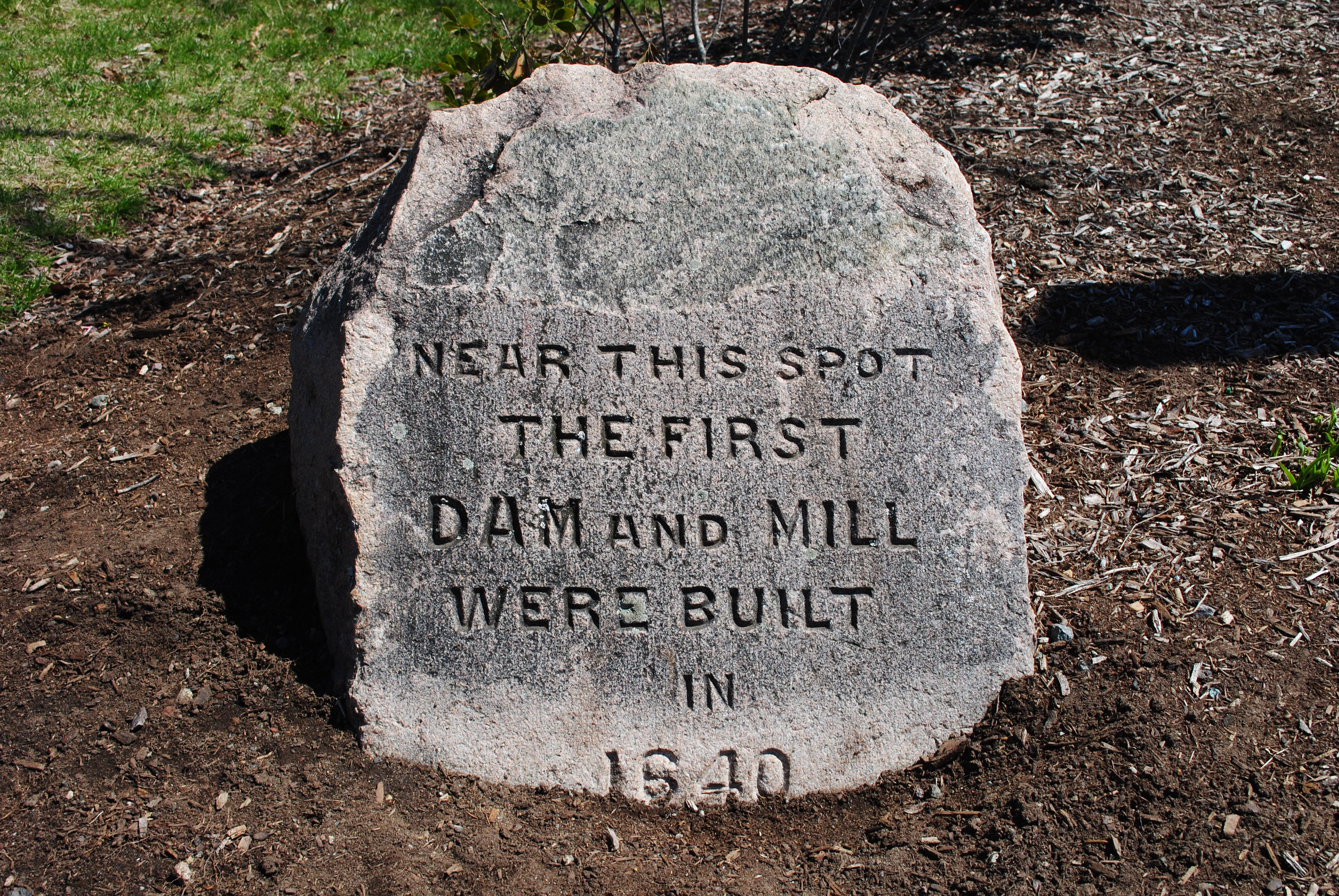
A stone from 1886 marking the location of the first mill built on Mother Brook

The Town also offered an incentive of 60 acres of land to whoever would construct and maintain a corn mill, as long as the mill was ready to grind corn by "the first of the 10th month"[i.e. December]. (Note: Before the adaptation of the Gregorian calendar in the United States, the year did not begin in January.) The first corn mill was erected in 1641 by John Elderkin, a recent arrival from Lynn, at a dam on East Brook next to the present day Condon Park and near the intersection of Bussey St and Colburn St. This was the first public utility in the nation. Early settlers could grind their corn at the mill, and in return paid a tithe to help maintain the mill.

In 1642, Elderkin sold half of his rights to Whiting and the other half to John Allin, Nathan Aldis, and John Dwight. (Note: Allin was the minister, Aldis the deacon, and Dwight was Whiting's father-in-law.) They operated the mill "in a rather stormy partnership" until 1649 when Whiting became the sole owner.

The Town was displeased with the "insufficient performance" of the mill under Whiting's management. As the only miller in town, residents were dependent upon him. In 1652, Whiting sold his mill and all his town rights to John Dwight, Francis Chickering, Joshua Fisher, and John Morse for 250 pounds, but purchased it back the following year. Whiting and five generations of his descendants ran their mill from 1641 until 1823, when it was sold. The family controlled land on Mother Brook until the 1830s.

In January 1653 the Town offered land to Robert Crossman if he would build a mill on the Charles where Abraham Shaw had originally intended, before the construction of Mother Brook. Crossman refused, but Whiting was so displeased by the prospect of a second mill that he offered to sell his mill back to the Town for 250 pounds. Whiting's performance did not improve, however, and the town wanted an alternative. Daniel Pond and Ezra Morse were then given permission by the Town to erect a new corn mill on the brook above Whiting's, so long as it was completed by June 24, 1665.

Whiting was upset by the competition for both water and customers and, "never one to forgive and forget, Whiting made something of a crusade of opposition" to the new mill. Records show that the Town spent "considerable time" trying to resolve the issue. (Note: The third paragraph of the Dedham Covenant stated: "That if at any time differences shall rise between parties of our said town, that then such party or parties shall presently refer all such differences unto some one, two or three others of our said society to be fully accorded and determined without any further delay, if it possibly may be.") After meeting with the Selectmen, both agreed to live in peace and not interfere with the business of the other. Two years later Morse was instructed to not hinder the water flow to such an extent that it would make milling difficult for Whiting.

The Town resolved that "in time of drought or want of water, the water shall in no such time be raised so high by the occasion of the new mill, that the water be thereby hindered of its free course or passage out of the Charles River to the mill. The proprietors of the old mill are at the same time restricted from raising the water in their pond so high as to prejudice the new mill by flowage of backwater." At the same time, Whiting was also told to repair leaks in his own dam before complaining about a lack of water.

Trouble and disputes, including a lawsuit, continued between the two until 1678 when Town Meeting voted not to hear any more complaints from Whiting. In 1699, the Morse dam at present day Maverick Street was removed, and Morse was given 40 acres of land near the Neponset River at Tiot in compensation. This seems to have been Morse's idea.

The next mill was constructed in 1682 at Mill Lane. Originally requested by Jonathan Fairbanks and James Draper, the privilege was granted to Whiting and Draper instead, likely to avoid any more problems with Whiting. Whiting died on the day the rights were granted to him, however. This mill was for fulling wool, and was the first textile mill in Dedham. A condition was attached to this permission, however, that if the Town wanted to erect a corn mill on the brook that they may do so, unless Draper and Whiting did so at their own expense. This mill, like the one above it, was held by Whiting's descendants for 180 years. One of Whiting's mills burned in 1700, and so the Town loaned him 20 pounds to rebuild.

At some point in the early 1700s a new leather mill was constructed by Joseph Lewis, Whiting's son-in-law, at the site of the old Morse dam. A fourth mill was established, at present day Stone Mill Drive, just down stream from the third in 1787 by two of Whiting's descendants. For a short period of time it produced copper cents, and then was used to manufacture paper. A third of Whiting's descendants opened a wire factory on the same site.

== Works cited ==
- Hill, Don Gleason, ed. (1892). The Early Records of the Town of Dedham, Massachusetts. 1636–1659. Vol. 3. Dedham Transcript.
- Hanson, Robert Brand (1976). Dedham, Massachusetts, 1635-1890. Dedham Historical Society.
- Worthington, Erastus (1900). Historical sketch of Mother Brook, Dedham, Mass: compiled from various records and papers, showing the diversion of a portion of the Charles River into the Neponset River and the manufactures on the stream, from 1639 to 1900. Dedham, MA: C.G. Wheeler.
- Lamson, Alvan (1839). A History of the First Church and Parish in Dedham, in Three Discourses. Herman Mann.
- Neiswander, Judith (2024). Mother Brook and the Mills of East Dedham. Damianos Publishing. ISBN 978-1-941573-66-2.
