= Mathew Waller =

Early New England colonist

- Born: London, England
- Baptized: September 18, 1617
- Died: May 26, 1680 (aged 62); New London, Connecticut Colony, English America
- Known for: Among the first settlers of New London, Connecticut
- Spouse: Sarah (unknown surname)
- Children: 2

Signature
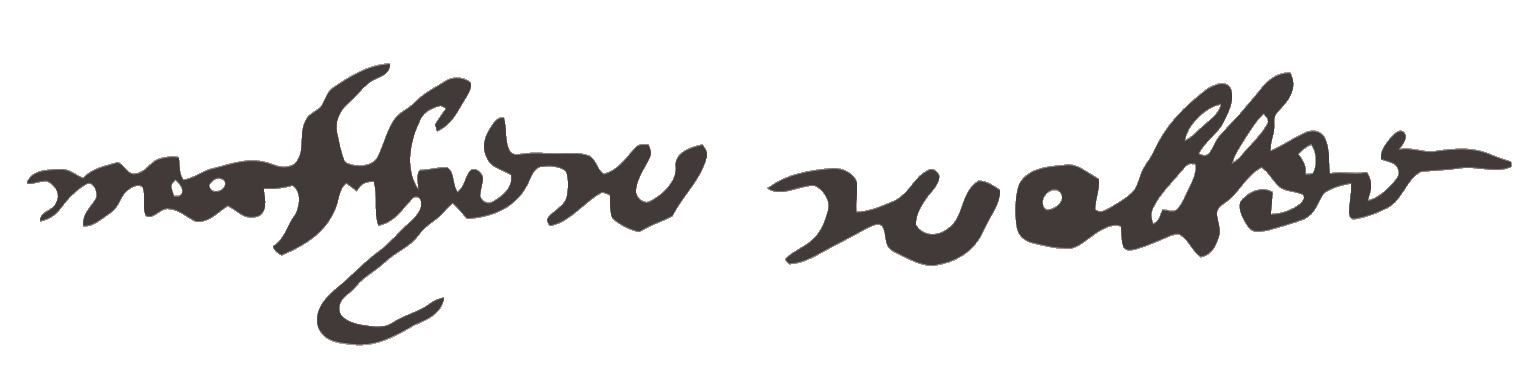

Mathew Waller (baptized September 18, 1617 – May 26, 1680) was an early settler of New London, Connecticut Colony. He was among the six hired in 1650 by John Winthrop Jr.–the founder of New London (then Pequot Plantation)–to build the town's first gristmill. Before settling in New London, Waller lived in Salem, Massachusetts Bay Colony, and Providence in what would become the Colony of Rhode Island and Providence Plantations.

== Family ==
Mathew Waller's parents were Thomas and Sarah (Wolterton) Waller, both of England. He was baptized in 1617 at the Church of St. Andrew, Holborn in London, England. Waller immigrated to New England before 1637. His mother and at least two of his siblings, William and Bridget, also immigrated. William was one of the original settlers of Saybrook (now Lyme), Connecticut.

Mathew Waller and Sarah, whose maiden name is unknown, were married in New England. They had two daughters, Sarah and Rebecka. His daughter Sarah never married and Rebecka was married twice but had no children.

== New England ==
Waller owned land in Salem by 1637, in Providence by 1643, and in New London by 1651. His immediate family followed him later to Providence, perhaps as late as 1648, and to New London after the mid-1660s.

=== Salem (1637–1648) ===
In 1637 Waller was enfranchised (given voting rights) and granted five acres on the North Neck in Salem. He received two more acres of meadowland in 1638 and was granted "20 acres to be (added to the 10) layd out by the towne" the following year. His wife, Sarah, is listed as a member of the First Church of Salem in 1648, which was several years after he acquired property in Providence.

=== Providence (1643–1669) ===
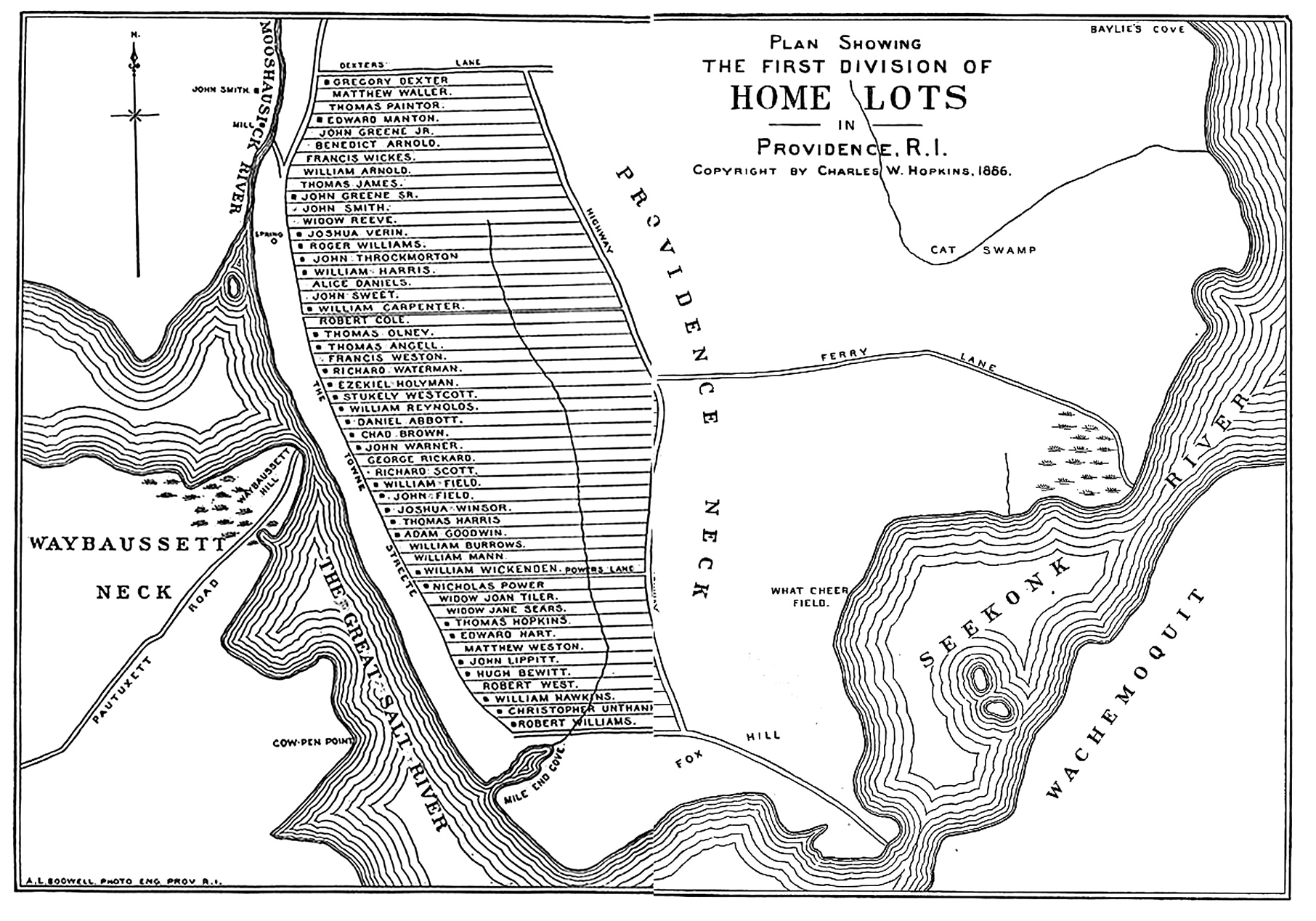
Town lot layout of Providence with Waller's home lot lying below Dexter's and second from the top.

In 1643, Waller was granted a home lot on Towne Street which stretched from the present-day Steere House at 7 Benefit Street eastward to Hope Street. It is believed Waller did not initially build a home on the lot but boarded elsewhere in Providence. He signed the Providence Combination of 1640 (an arbitration-based compact).

Between 1648 and 1649 Waller served as a witness, an arbitrator, and a juror in several trials. In 1648 he appeared as a witness against a group of men who fired weapons "in jest," which caused the town to sound the alarm warning of an attack. In the same year he was appointed as an arbitrator with John Throckmorton for a trial against Edward Manton who was accused by Adonijah Morrice of "breach of covenant." In 1649 he and Throckmorton were arbitrators for a trial to settle a dispute between William Harris and Richard Chasmore regarding payment for cattle. Also in 1649, he served on a jury for the trial of Nanheggen of Pawtuxet, a Native American who was accused of burgling the home of Jane Sayes.

Waller was not listed on the Providence tax list in 1650, however he was listed as a freeman of Providence in 1655.

Waller sold his home lot on Towne Street to Gregory Dexter in about 1663. In the same year he purchased a fifty-acre lot of meadowland lying northwest of town on the Woonasquatucket River in what would become Smithfield. Historian Michael Cavanagh writes:

1662 Providence forms a committee to lay out a new town on lands near Wayunkeke Hill freed up by the 7 Mile Line sale. Thomas Olney Sr., William Carpenter and John Brown were the planners. William Hawkins and John Steere were granted 50 acres each provided they built houses, cut hay and lived there for 3 years. Hawkins settles near Ripper's Brook. Roger Williams, Thomas Olney and son and Mathew Waller were other buyers of 50 acre lots. At this time the town was not founded, only laid out.

In 1669 Waller attended a court meeting in Providence.

=== New London (1649–1680) ===
Waller sometimes delivered mail between New London and Providence. For example, here is part of a letter he carried from Roger Williams–the founder of Providence–to John Winthrop Jr.:

For my honourd kind fr[iend] Mr. Jo: Winthrop at Pequt
Nar. 15. 2. 49 (so called)
Sir, Best respects and loue to you both: By this bearer (Math. Waller) I received your booke, and had by the same returned it, but that I desire to reade it ouer once more, finding it pleasant and profitable, and crave the sight of any other of that subiect at your leasure, kindly thancking you for this inclosed:
[...]
R: W:
My lo[ving] respect to your lo[ving] sister. I hope it will please God to send you a mill.

In 1650, the prayer in the postscript of this letter was fulfilled: Waller was among the six men John Winthrop Jr. hired to build the town's first mill. Waller provided Winthrop with a receipt of payment for his labor:

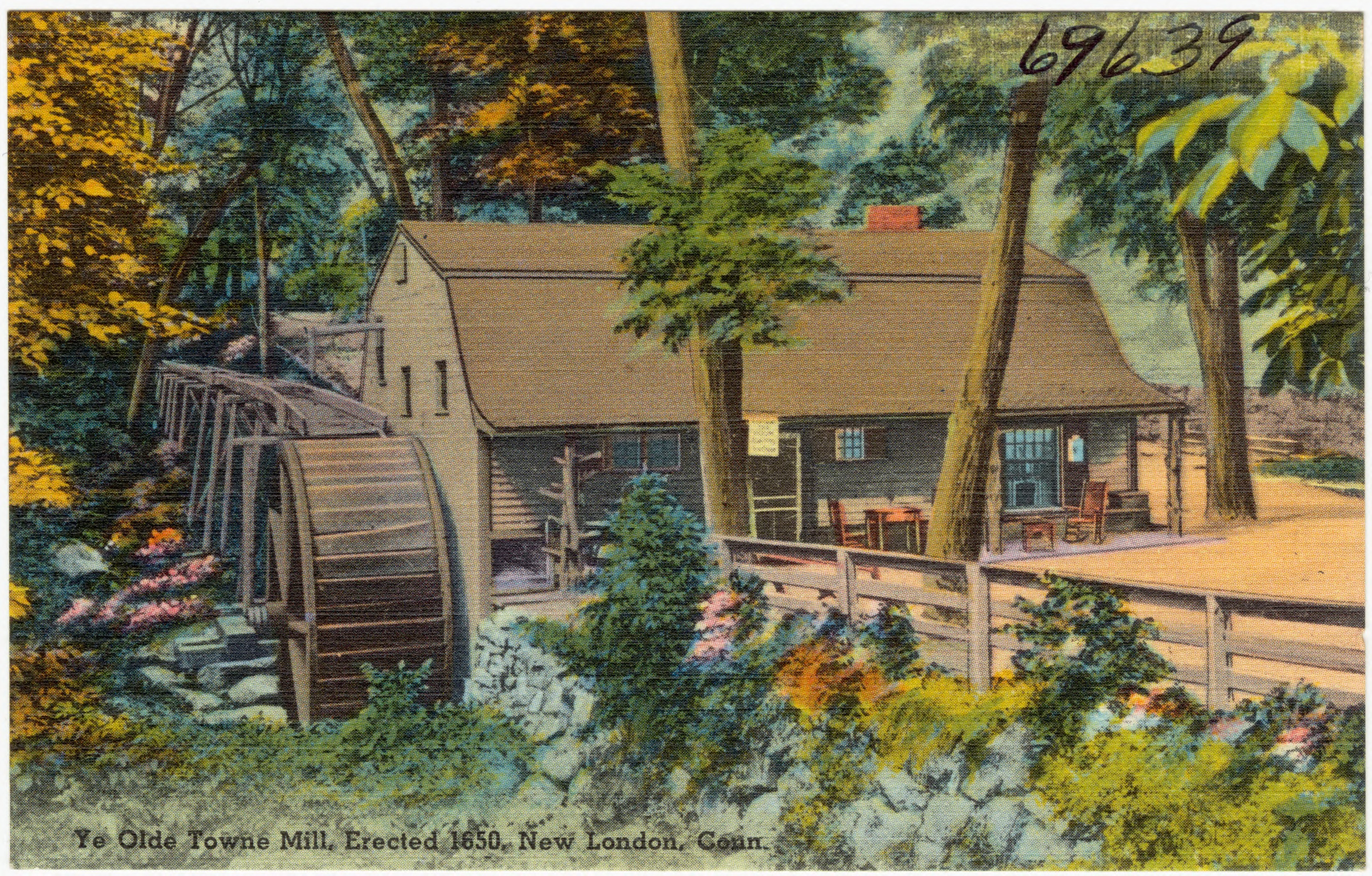
Old Town Mill in New London

Received this 17th. of October 1650 of Mr. John Winthrop of Pequitt by we John Elderkin and Mathew Waller the Foll som of forty pound by ether of us twenty pound in Foll satisfaction for buildinge a mill For the said Mr. John Winthrop of Pequitt.

In about 1651, Mathew Waller applied for a home lot. In 1667, Waller was fined for not attending the Puritan church called the First Church of Christ. A few years later, in 1671, his adult daughters were baptized in that church.

== Death and legacy ==
Waller died on May 26, 1680, in New London. "Matthew Waller aged about 63, dyed very suddainly, none at yt time in ye room wth him. He was well a few minutes before."

The former neighborhood that grew up around Waller's home near Granite Street in New London was named Waller's Hill in his honor. The mill in New London that Waller helped build was burned down by General Benedict Arnold in 1781. The restored mill is now known as the Old Town Mill and is listed on the National Register of Historic Places.
