= Josiah Turner (judge) =

American judge

Josiah Turner (September 1, 1811 – April 7, 1907) was a Michigan pioneer and Supreme Court judge.

Turner was born in New Haven, Vermont on September 1, 1811. In 1831, Turner moved to St. Albans, Vermont, to read law with his uncle, Bates Turner, a former Vermont Supreme Court justice. admittance to the Vermont bar followed in September 1833. In 1840, The Turners would moved to Howell, Michigan. Turner served as a Michigan circuit judge, and was appointed by Republican Michigan Governor Kinsley S. Bingham to the Michigan Supreme Court in 1857. In 1860 the Turners moved to Owosso, Michigan, where h wad elected Mayor in April 1864. He would announce in Owosso the assassination of President Abraham Lincoln. Turner was elected an 1867 Michigan Constitutional Convention delegate. Turner was appointed the United States Consulate General at Amherstburg, Ontario, Canada. Turner would die on April 7, 1907, in Owosso, Michigan. Turner was a relative of Wolcott Turner Brooks, a member of the Wisconsin State Assembly.
