= Asa Aldis =

American judge (1770–1847)

Chief Justice of the Vermont Supreme Court
- In office 1815–1815
- Preceded by: Nathaniel Chipman
- Succeeded by: Richard Skinner

State's Attorney of Franklin County, Vermont
- In office 1804–1806
- Preceded by: Levi House
- Succeeded by: Ebenezer Marvin Jr.

Personal details
- Born: April 14, 1770 Franklin, Massachusetts
- Died: October 16, 1847 (aged 77) St. Albans, Vermont
- Resting place: Greenwood Cemetery, St. Albans, Vermont
- Party: Democratic-Republican
- Spouse: Amey Owen (m. 1802-1847, his death)
- Relations: Daniel Owen (father-in-law); Daniel Kellogg (son-in-law)
- Children: Asa Owen Aldis
- Education: Brown University
- Occupation: Attorney

Asa Aldis (April 14, 1770 – October 16, 1847) was a Vermont attorney, politician, and judge. He served as chief justice of the Vermont Supreme Court in 1815.

== Biography ==
Asa Aldis was born in Franklin, Massachusetts on April 14, 1770. His mother died in 1773, and his father in 1775, after which Aldis was raised by an aunt. Aldis received his early education from private tutors, and in 1792 he began attendance at Rhode Island College (now known as Brown University), from which he graduated in 1796. He was descended from John Aldis and Nathan Aldis.

After graduating from college, Aldis studied law with Judge David Howell of Providence, Rhode Island, and attained admission to the bar. He practiced for three years in Chepachet, and then traveled to the western portion of the United States seeking better professional opportunities. On his return trip to Rhode Island, Aldis passed through St. Albans, Vermont, which he decided to make his home.

After settling in Vermont in 1802, Aldis established a thriving law practice, initially in partnership with Bates Turner, who also served on the Vermont Supreme Court. Among the prospective attorneys who studied under Aldis was Orlando Stevens, who served in the legislatures of both Vermont and Minnesota. Aldis served as state's attorney of Franklin County from 1804 to 1806. In 1815 he was appointed Chief Justice of the Vermont Supreme Court. That year, the Democratic-Republicans who assumed control of the state government replaced all three of the court's Federalist justices; Aldis served with Richard Skinner and James Fisk. Aldis had not sought the appointment, and agreed to serve as chief justice on the condition that a successor would be quickly appointed. After resigning once Skinner was confirmed as Chief Justice, Aldis resumed practicing law in St. Albans.

In 1820, Aldis served on the Council of Censors, which met every seven years to review actions of the governor and executive council and the Vermont House of Representatives to ensure their constitutionality. In 1824 and 1828, Aldis was one of Vermont's presidential electors. In 1824, John Quincy Adams won Vermont's popular vote, and Aldis cast his electoral votes for Adams for president and John C. Calhoun for vice president. In 1828, Adams again carried Vermont in the popular vote, and Aldis cast his electoral votes for Adams and his vice presidential running mate, Richard Rush.

In 1832, Aldis was an Anti-Masonic Party candidate for Congress in Vermont's 4th District. Going back to the 1830 general election, several special elections were required because no candidate won a majority; Aldis appeared on the ballot in February, April, and June 1832. In the June election, incumbent National Republican Heman Allen (of Milton) received over 50% of the vote and retained his seat.

== Death and burial ==
Aldis died in St. Albans on October 16, 1847. He was buried at Greenwood Cemetery in St. Albans.

== Family ==
Asa Aldis was the husband of Amey Owen (1770-1867), the daughter of Daniel Owen, who served as Lieutenant Governor of Rhode Island. Amey Owen was the widow of William Gadcomb; her children with Gadcomb included Fidelia Burnett Gadcomb. Fidelia Gadcomb was the wife of Lawrence Brainerd, and Fidelia Gadcomb and Lawrence Barinerd were the parents of several children, including Ann Eliza Smith.

Amey Owen and Asa Aldis were the parents of a son, Asa Owen Aldis, who practiced law in partnership with his father and was also a justice of the Vermont Supreme Court. They were also the parents of a daughter, Miranda Metcalf Aldis, who was the wife of Vermont Supreme Court Justice Daniel Kellogg.

== Sources ==
=== Books ===
- Aldrich, Lewis Cass (1891). History of Franklin and Grand Isle Counties, Vermont. Syracuse, NY: D. Mason & Co. p. 223.
- Hughes, Thomas Patrick; Munsell, Frank (1899). American Ancestry: Giving Name and Descent, in the Male Line, of Americans Whose Ancestors Settled in the United States Previous to the Declaration of Independence. Vol. 12. Albany, NY: Joel Munsell's Sons.
- Ullery, Jacob G. (1894). Men of Vermont Illustrated. Brattleboro, VT: Transcript Publishing Company. p. 179.
- A Descriptive and Historical Guide to the Valley of Lake Champlain and the Adirondacks. Burlington, VT: R. S. Styles. 1871 – via Google Books.

=== Internet ===
- Vermont State Archives (June 12, 2006). "General Election Results, U.S. Representatives, 1822–1830 (Five Districts)" (PDF). www.sec.state.vt.us. Montpelier, VT: Vermont Secretary of State. Archived from the original (PDF) on 2017-10-25.

=== Magazines ===
Mimms, John H. (1892). "Sketch of Orlando Stevens". Report of Proceedings of the Annual Meeting of the Vermont Bar Association. Vol. III, no. 1. Montpelier, VT: Argus & Patriot Book and Job Print.

Political offices
Preceded by Nathaniel Chipman	Chief Justice of the Vermont Supreme Court; 1815–1815	Succeeded by Richard Skinner
