= Orlando Stevens =

American politician (1797–1879)

Orlando Stevens (October 12, 1797 - March 25, 1879) was an attorney and politician whose career included work in Vermont and Minnesota. He is most notable for having served as a member of the Vermont House of Representatives, Vermont Senate, and Minnesota House of Representatives.

== Biography ==
Orlando Stevens was born in Rutland, Vermont on October 12, 1797, the son of David Stevens and Polly (Crafts) Stevens. Orlando Stevens was raised in St. Albans, and was educated at the Franklin County Grammar School and Castleton Seminary. He then studied law with Asa Aldis, was admitted to the bar in 1819, and began to practice in Swanton.

In 1822, Stevens married Parma Fisk (1805-1854), the daughter of James Fisk. At the time, Fisk was the U.S. Collector of Customs in Swanton, and he appointed Stevens as his deputy. Stevens later moved to East Highgate, where he continued to practice law while becoming involved in the lumber business, followed by relocation to St. Albans, where he established a successful law practice. A Whig, Stevens served as state's attorney of Franklin County from 1839 to 1842. From 1845 to 1846 he served in the Vermont House of Representatives. From 1852 to 1853, Stevens served in the Vermont Senate, and was chosen to serve as the Senate's President pro tempore.

After serving in the Vermont Senate, Stevens relocated to Winona, Minnesota, where he continued to practice law. By now a Republican, from 1859 to 1860, Stevens was a member of the Minnesota House of Representatives. He later suffered a stroke which left him partly paralyzed, and he decided to return to St. Albans, where he lived in retirement.

== Death and burial ==
Stevens died in St. Albans on March 25, 1879, and was buried at Greenwood Cemetery in St. Albans.

== Family ==
The children of Orlando Stevens and Parma Fisk included daughter Parma, who was the wife of David Olmsted, the fourth mayor of Saint Paul, Minnesota.

== Sources ==
=== Newspapers ===
- "Rutland Notes: The Late Hon. Orlando Stevens". Burlington Democrat and Sentinel. Burlington, VT. April 12, 1879 – via Newspapers.com.

=== Magazines ===
- Mimms, John H. (1892). "Sketch of Orlando Stevens". Report of Proceedings of the Annual Meeting of the Vermont Bar Association. Vol. III, no. 1. Montpelier, VT: Argus & Patriot Book and Job Print.

=== Books ===
- Crafts, James M.; Crafts, William Francis (1893). The Crafts Family: A Genealogical and Biographical History of the Descendants of Griffin and Alice Craft of Roxbury, Mass., 1630-1890. Northampton, MA: Gazette Printing Company.
- Minnesota State Legislature (1901). The Legislative Manual of the State of Minnesota. St. Paul, MN: Pioneer Press Company.
- Vermont General Assembly (1852). Journal of the House of Representatives and Senate of the State of Vermont. Rutland, VT: Tuttle & Co.
- Ward, George Kemp (1912). Genealogy of the Olmsted Family in America. New York, NY: A. T. De La Mare.
