= Owen Aldis =

American psychologist

Owen Aldis (1926–2001) was an American behavioural psychologist. He was born into a notable Chicago family. His father was one of the trustees of the University of Chicago and ran a real estate management firm, his mother a writer of children's poetry and his maternal grandfather on the editor of the Chicago Tribune. Aldis taught economics at Yale University and worked in investment in New York. But in the 1950s he moved west to San Francisco's Bay Area and began to develop his academic interest in behavioral psychology. He is most noted for his well received 1971 publication Play Fighting which is an ethological classic examining play in humans and animals. The study was based on extensive observational studies: 1,500 hours of field observation on humans, 700 hours of observations on animals at four California zoos and more than twenty hours of filmed playing humans and various animals.

He was a member of the International Society for Human Ethology.

== Selected publications ==
- Aldis, Owen (1975) Play Fighting, Academic Press, New York, ISBN 0-12-049450-7
- Aldis, Owen (1961) Of Pigeons and Men, Harvard Business Review, 39(4), 59–63.
