= ALTIS Graduate School of Sustainable Management =

- Motto: Entrepreneurship and Management for Sustainable Development
- Type: Private
- Established: 2005
- Affiliations: Università Cattolica del Sacro Cuore
- Director: Vito Moramarco
- Location: Milan, Lombardy, Italy
- Campus: Urban
- Website: altis.unicatt.it

ALTIS Graduate School of Sustainable Management, formerly called ALTIS – Graduate School Business & Society (Italian: Alta Scuola Impresa e Società) is the business school for graduate students of the Università Cattolica del Sacro Cuore in Milan, Italy. The school offers MBA programs, specializing masters and many executive education programs.

== History ==
ALTIS, Graduate School Business and Society, was conceived in 2002 within the Università Cattolica del Sacro Cuore from an idea of Mario Molteni, Professor of Business Administration and Corporate Strategy, and the former Rector, Professor Lorenzo Ornaghi. In those years, the European countries were starting to integrate the concepts of corporate social responsibility (CSR) and sustainable development into their agendas. Italy was one of the early adopters of the EU's guidelines on sustainability. In this context, it was then decided to create inside the university a Graduate School entirely dedicated to researching, educating and transferring knowledge on entrepreneurship and management directed at the sustainable development.

In 2010, ALTIS launched its first “Master in Social Entrepreneurship and Management” in Kenya. Based on a "Business Ideas Competition," it selected the best business ideas among the candidates’ proposals, which were then developed, validated and tested throughout the program.

ALTIS also introduced the first MBA of the Università Cattolica del Sacro Cuore, in partnership with 24Ore Business School and offered in Milan.

== Master's Degrees ==
=== Programmes in English ===
==== MBAs in Africa ====
Since 2010, ALTIS has been offering an MBA programme for impact entrepreneurs in a growing number of African countries (13 in 2020). The first edition was called "Master in Social Entrepreneurship and Management" and was organised in Kenya in partnership with the Catholic University of Eastern Africa's Tangaza College. In the light of the good results of this first editions, ALTIS could later involve also other prestigious universities such as the Loyola Institute of Business Administration (Chennai, India) and the Santa Clara University (California). In 2012, this MBA was the first non-American programme to be honored with the AshokaU-Cordes Innovation Award, conferred by Ashoka, a prestigious non-profit international organization that works with social entrepreneurs. Today, ALTIS' spinoff, E4Impact Foundation, organises and coordinates the MBAs across Africa. The "MBA in Impact Entrepreneurship" is based on a business idea competition aimed at developing, testing and validating projects with the guidance of experts and investors from Africa and Italy.

== Training Programmes for Professionals ==
ALTIS also designs training programmes for junior and senior professionals and for the companies that support the continuous learning of their employees. The School has trained hundreds of sustainability managers and professionals who work with CSR, public officers, directors and teachers of non-state schools, social entrepreneurs, financial managers and accountants.

== Divisions ==
The activities of ALTIS are structured in thematic divisions:

- Sustainable strategic management and sustainability
- SMEs and Industrial Districts
- Non-profit management
- Sustainable finance
- Public Management
- Social Entrepreneurship
