= Bates Turner =

American judge (1760–1847)

Associate Justice of the Vermont Supreme Court
- In office 1827–1828
- Preceded by: Stephen Royce
- Succeeded by: Stephen Royce

Member of the Vermont House of Representatives
- In office 1813–1814
- Preceded by: Elijah Foot
- Succeeded by: Joab Smith
- Constituency: St. Albans Town, Vermont

Personal details
- Born: October 30, 1760 Canaan, Connecticut, British America
- Died: April 30, 1847 (aged 86) St. Albans, Vermont, U.S.
- Resting place: Greenwood Cemetery, St. Albans, Vermont, U.S.
- Spouse(s): Persis Humphrey (m. 1796); Sarah Webb (m. 1815)
- Relatives: Josiah Turner (nephew)
- Education: Litchfield Law School
- Profession: Attorney

Military service
- Allegiance: United States
- Service: Continental Army
- Years of service: 1780
- Rank: Private
- Unit: Converse's Company, 7th Connecticut Regiment
- Wars: American Revolutionary War

Bates Turner (October 30, 1760 – April 30, 1847) was a Vermont lawyer, judge and politician. In addition to serving as a member of the Vermont House of Representatives, he was a justice of the Vermont Supreme Court for two years.

== Biography ==
Turner was born in October 1760 in what would become Canaan, Connecticut, the son of Samuel Turner and Sarah (Howe) Turner. He served in the Continental Army as a member of Captain Thomas Converse's Company, 7th Connecticut Regiment during the American Revolutionary War. In 1780, he graduated from the Litchfield Law School.

Turner practiced law in Connecticut, and moved to Vermont in 1798; he originally resided in Fairfield, and later in St. Albans. For a time, his law partner in St. Albans was Asa Aldis, who subsequently served as chief justice of the Vermont Supreme Court. Turner subsequently returned to Fairfield; in addition to practicing law, he also trained several prospective attorneys, including William C. Wilson. For brief periods, he lived in Middlebury and Fairfield, before finally returning to St. Albans. Turner's legal instruction was so sought after that he eventually began offering a formal program of study, which was organized along the lines of the Litchfield Law School. During his career, between 175 and 200 attorneys obtained their legal education with Turner.

Turner was a member of the Vermont House of Representatives in 1813. He served on the Supreme Court from 1827 to 1828. In 1829, he was a member of the Council of Censors, which met every seven years to review actions of Vermont's government and ensure their constitutionality.

== Death and burial ==
Turner died in St. Albans on April 30, 1847. He was buried at Greenwood Cemetery in St. Albans.

== Family ==
In 1796, Turner married Mrs. Persis Humphrey of Rhode Island. She died in 1814, and in 1815 he married Mrs. Sarah Webb of North Hero.

His nephew, Josiah Turner, who had read law under him, became a justice of the Michigan Supreme Court. Another relative, Wolcott Turner Brooks, served as a member of the Wisconsin State Assembly.

Turner's stepdaughter Abigail Webb was married to Herman R. Beardsley, who also served on the Vermont Supreme Court.
