= New Haven, Vermont =

- Town
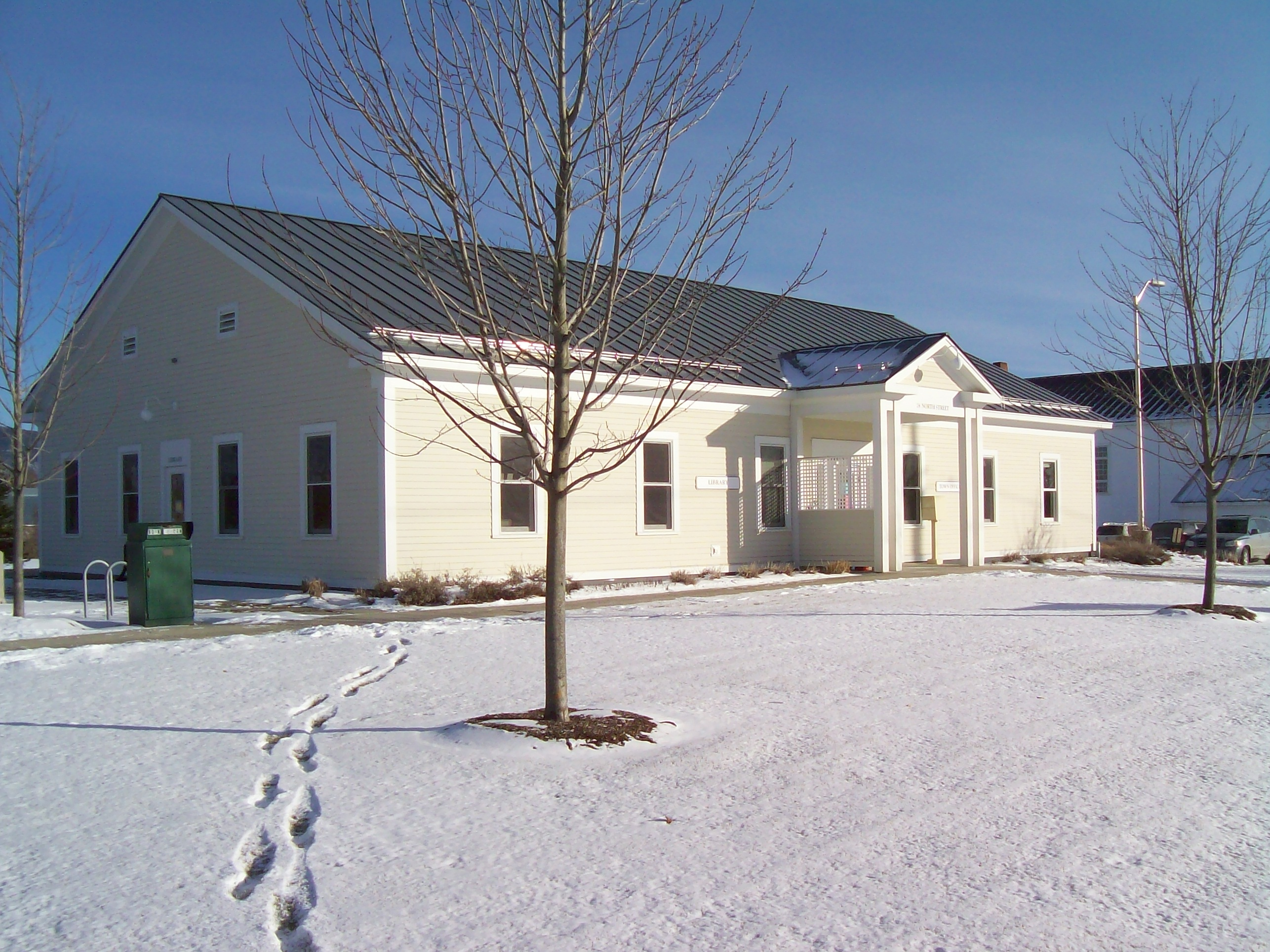
- Town offices and library

- Location in Addison County and the state of Vermont
- Coordinates: 44°06′30″N 73°08′15″W
- Country: United States
- State: Vermont
- County: Addison
- Communities: New Haven; New Haven Junction; New Haven Mills; Brooksville

Area
  - Total: 41.5 sq mi (107.6 km^{2})
  - Land: 41.2 sq mi (106.7 km^{2})
  - Water: 0.35 sq mi (0.9 km^{2})
- Elevation: 345 ft (105 m)

Population (2020)
  - Total: 1,683
  - Density: 41/sq mi (15.8/km^{2})
- Time zone: UTC-5 (Eastern (EST))
  - Summer (DST): UTC-4 (EDT)
- ZIP code: 05472
- Area code: 802
- FIPS code: 50-48700
- GNIS feature ID: 1462160
- Website: www.newhavenvt.com

New Haven is a town in Addison County, Vermont, United States. The population was 1,683 at the 2020 census. In addition to the town center, New Haven contains the communities of Belden (sometimes called Belden Falls), Brooksville, New Haven Junction and New Haven Mills.

== History ==
In July 1830, New Haven was heavily affected by the Great Freshet of 1830. Floodwaters along the New Haven River destroyed bridges, mills, and homes, and fourteen residents were reported killed.

== Geography ==
New Haven is located in north-central Addison County, in the Champlain Valley. It is bordered by Ferrisburgh and Monkton to the north, Bristol to the east, Middlebury to the south, Weybridge to the southwest, and Waltham to the northwest. The town of Addison, west of Weybridge and Waltham, touches New Haven at one corner.

Otter Creek, one of the longest rivers in Vermont, forms part of the town's southwest border, with falls at Belden and Huntington Falls. The New Haven River, rising to the east in the Green Mountains, flows into Otter Creek at Brooksville.

U.S. Route 7 runs north-south through the town, connecting Vergennes and Middlebury. Vermont Route 17 crosses Route 7 at New Haven Junction and runs east into Bristol and west to Addison and the Crown Point Bridge over Lake Champlain into New York.

According to the United States Census Bureau, New Haven has a total area of 41.5 square miles (107.6 km^{2}), of which 41.2 square miles (106.7 km^{2}) is land and 0.35 square miles (0.9 km^{2}), or 0.84%, is water.

== Demographics ==
Historical population
Census	Pop.	Note	%±
1790	723		—
1800	1,135		57.0%
1810	1,688		48.7%
1820	1,566		−7.2%
1830	1,834		17.1%
1840	1,503		−18.0%
1850	1,663		10.6%
1860	1,419		−14.7%
1870	1,355		−4.5%
1880	1,355		0.0%
1890	1,224		−9.7%
1900	1,107		−9.6%
1910	1,161		4.9%
1920	1,001		−13.8%
1930	964		−3.7%
1940	881		−8.6%
1950	932		5.8%
1960	922		−1.1%
1970	1,039		12.7%
1980	1,217		17.1%
1990	1,375		13.0%
2000	1,666		21.2%
2010	1,727		3.7%
2020	1,683		−2.5%
U.S. Decennial Census

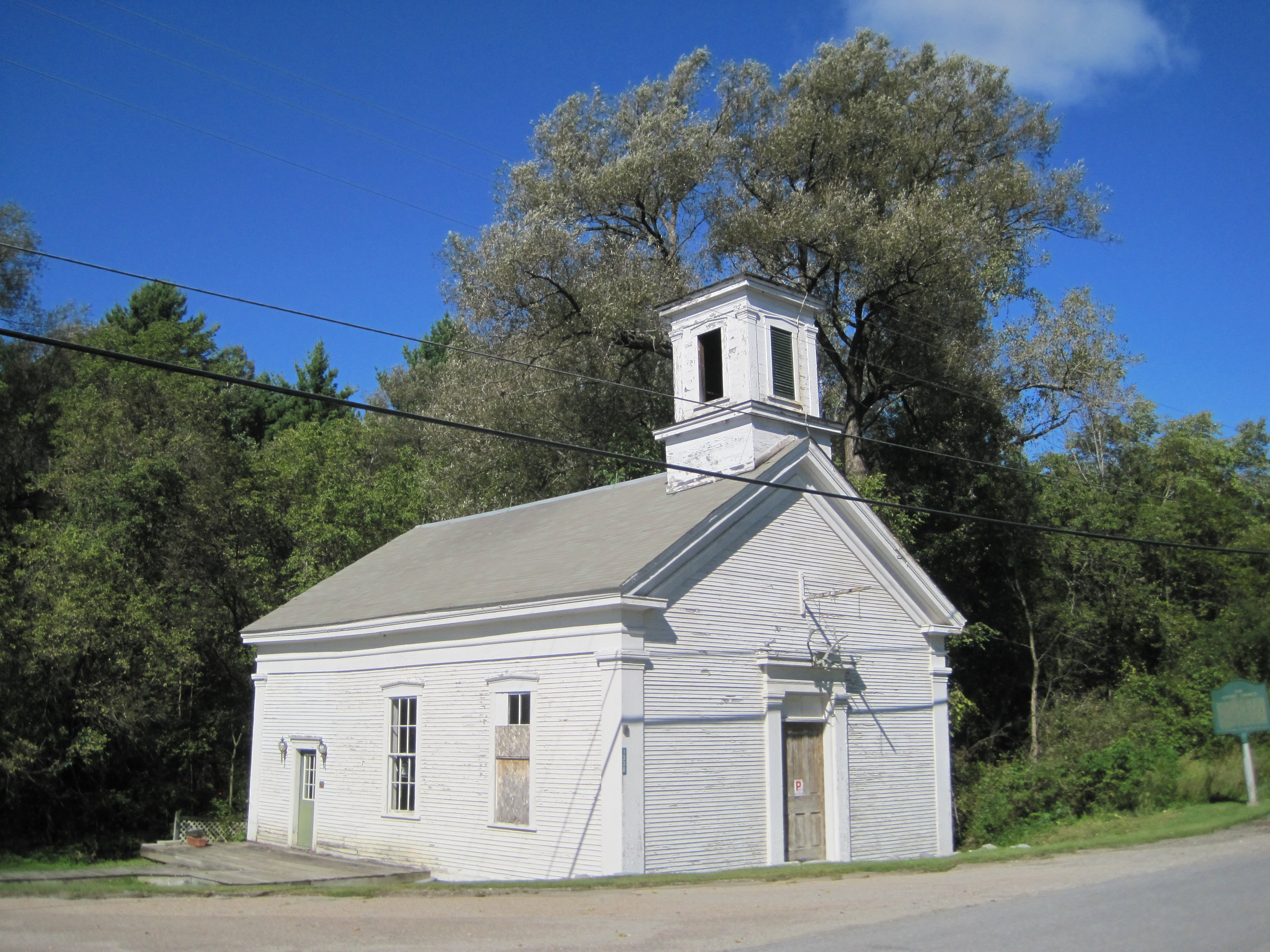
The Brooksville Advent Church on Dog Team Road just off of US Route 7

As of the census of 2020, there were 1,683 people, 770 households, and 459 families residing in the town. The population density was 40.0 people per square mile (15.4/km^{2}). There were 665 housing units at an average density of 15.5 per square mile (6.0/km^{2}). The racial makeup of the town was 98.26% White, 0.24% African American, 0.60% Native American, and 0.90% from two or more races. Hispanic or Latino of any race were 0.84% of the population.

There were 770 households, out of which 37.4% had children under the age of 18 living with them, 64.1% were married couples living together, 7.0% had a female householder with no husband present, and 25.0% were non-families. 16.0% of all households were made up of individuals, and 5.1% had someone living alone who was 65 years of age or older. The average household size was 2.72 and the average family size was 3.09.

In the town, the age distribution of the population shows 27.0% under the age of 18, 7.3% from 18 to 24, 29.3% from 25 to 44, 27.0% from 45 to 64, and 9.5% who were 65 years of age or older. The median age was 38 years. For every 100 females, there were 104.2 males. For every 100 females age 18 and over, there were 105.8 males.

The median income for a household in the town was $47,014, and the median income for a family was $52,083. Males had a median income of $33,352 versus $22,721 for females. The per capita income for the town was $21,321. About 3.8% of families and 5.1% of the population were below the poverty line, including 2.8% of those under age 18 and 4.9% of those age 65 or over.

== Notable people ==
- Christopher A. Bray, member of the Vermont House of Representatives and Vermont Senate
- Wolcott Turner Brooks, Wisconsin State Assemblyman
- Josiah Bushnell Grinnell, founder of Grinnell, Iowa, and benefactor of Grinnell College
- Homer Hulbert, missionary and activist for Korean independence
- Curtis M. Lampson, fur merchant, best remembered for his promotion of the transatlantic telegraph cable
- Robert Bruce Langdon, Minnesota State Senator and businessman
- Edward Pier, Wisconsin State Senator
- Royal T. Sprague, 11th Chief Justice of the Supreme Court of California
- Allen R. Sturtevant, Associate Justice of the Vermont Supreme Court
