= Robert Bruce Langdon =

American businessman and politician (1826–1895)

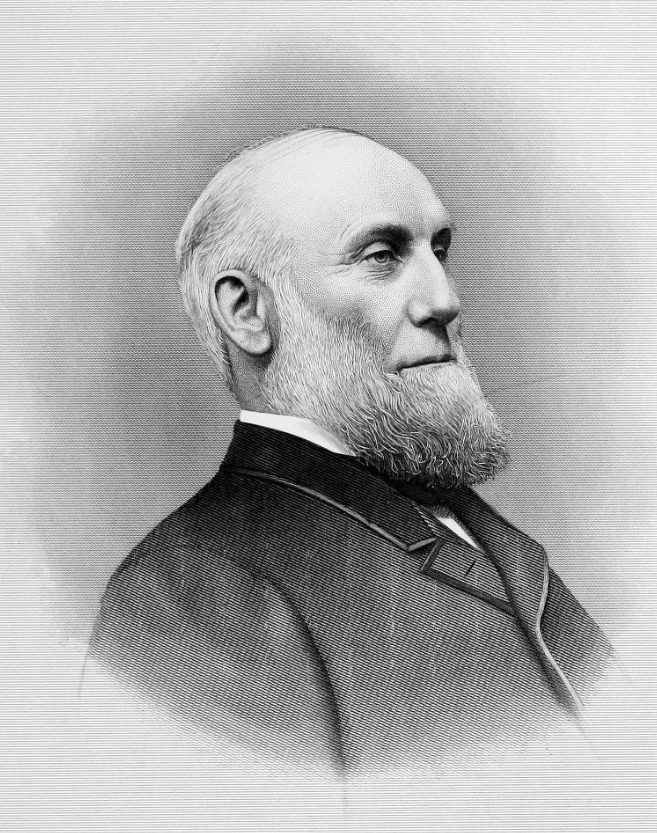
- Portrait of Langdon in 1892

Member of the Minnesota Senate
- In office 1873–1878, 1881–1886

Personal details
- Born: November 24, 1826 New Haven, Vermont
- Died: July 24, 1895 (aged 68) Minneapolis, Minnesota
- Resting place: Lakewood Cemetery
- Party: Republican; Whig
- Occupation: Businessman, contractor, politician
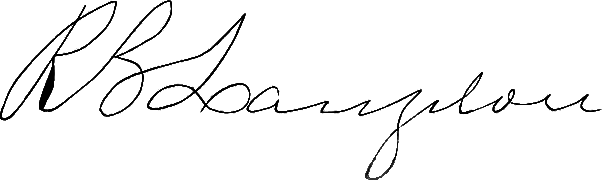
- Signature

Robert Bruce Langdon (November 24, 1826 – July 24, 1895) was an American businessman, contractor, and politician.

== Biography ==
Langdon was born on a farm in New Haven, Vermont, and went to Vermont public schools. Langdon moved to Saint Paul, Minnesota, in 1858 and then to Minneapolis with his wife and family in 1866. Langdon was a contractor and built bridges, roads, buildings, and railways. Langdon served in the Minnesota Senate from 1873 to 1878 and from 1881 to 1886 and was a Republican. He was also a member of the Whig Party.

He died in Minneapolis on July 24, 1895, and was buried at Lakewood Cemetery.

== Legacy ==
The communities of Langdon, Minnesota, and Langdon, North Dakota, were named after Langdon.
