= Jim Alldis Jr. =

English cricketer

James Stephen Alldis (27 December 1949, Paddington, London – 22 July 2023, Old Windsor, Berkshire) was an English cricketer who played two first-class matches for Middlesex in 1970.

A left-handed lower-order batsman and a left-arm orthodox spin bowler, Jim Alldis was the son of the former Middlesex scorer Jim Alldis, and was referred to at Lord's as Jim Alldis Jr. In his two matches, he scored seven runs at an average of 2.33 and took one wicket for 37, the single wicket being that of Keith Wheatley of Hampshire.

He played for Middlesex's second eleven in the Second Eleven Championship between 1968 and 1976 and later represented Berkshire in the Minor Counties Championship.

Alldis later worked as a taxi driver and a groundsman, specialising in cricket pitches.
