= Gillie Alldis =

English footballer

Personal information
- Full name: Gilbert John Alldis
- Date of birth: 26 January 1920
- Place of birth: Birkenhead, England
- Date of death: 1998 (aged 75–76)
- Position: Wing half

Senior career*
Years	Team	Apps	(Gls)
1938–1948	Tranmere Rovers	78	(4)
1950–1951	New Brighton	12	(0)
1951–	Prescot Cables		
- Bangor City
- * Club domestic league appearances and goals

Gilbert John Alldis (26 January 1920 – 1998) was a footballer who played as a wing half for Tranmere Rovers, New Brighton, Prescot Cables and Bangor City.
