= Asa O. Aldis =

American judge (1811–1891)

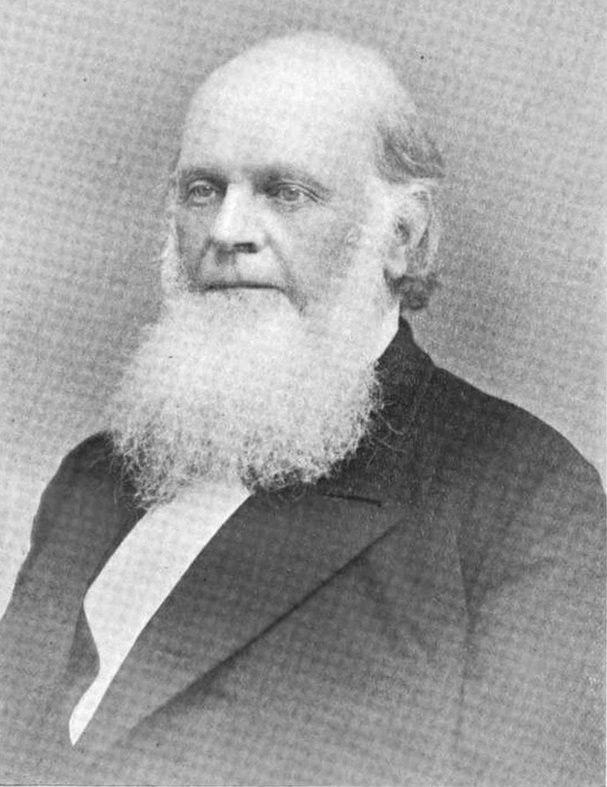
- From a biographical sketch by Edward A. Sowles presented to the Vermont Bar Association in 1901

United States Consul at Nice, France
- In office 1865–1871
- Preceded by: William Slade Jr.
- Succeeded by: William H. Vesey

Associate Justice of the Vermont Supreme Court
- In office 1857–1865
- Preceded by: None (New position)
- Succeeded by: Herman R. Beardsley

Personal details
- Born: September 2, 1811 St. Albans, Vermont, US
- Died: June 24, 1891 (aged 79) Washington, DC, US
- Resting place: Greenwood Cemetery, St. Albans, Vermont, US
- Party: Republican
- Spouse(s): Elizabeth Sterne Lynde (m. 1836–1837) Mary Townsend Taylor (m. 1841–1891)
- Children: 9
- Relatives: Asa Aldis (father)
- Education: University of Vermont; Harvard Law School (attended); Yale Law School (attended)
- Profession: Attorney

Asa Owen Aldis (September 2, 1811 – June 24, 1891) was a Vermont attorney, judge and diplomat. He served as a justice of the Vermont Supreme Court, and as U.S. Consul to Nice, France.

== Biography ==
Asa O. Aldis was born in St. Albans, Vermont on September 2, 1811, the son of Asa Aldis, who served as a justice of the Vermont Supreme Court. His mother was Amey (Owen) Aldis, whose father Daniel J. Owen had served as Lieutenant Governor of Rhode Island and Chief Justice of the Rhode Island Supreme Court. His sister Miranda was the wife of Vermont Supreme Court Justice Daniel Kellogg. He was descended from John Aldis and Nathan Aldis.

Aldis graduated from the University of Vermont in 1829. He studied at Harvard Law School and Yale Law School, attained admission to the bar in 1832, and practiced in partnership with his father. Aldis continued to practice in St. Albans after his father's death, first as the partner of John Smith, and later in partnership with Smith's son J. Gregory Smith. A Republican, In 1857 he was elected a justice of the Vermont Supreme Court, and he continued to serve until resigning in 1865.

The deaths of two daughters, one in 1862, and one in 1863, caused Aldis to solicit a diplomatic appointment that would enable him to move his children to a healthier climate, and he left the Vermont Supreme Court in order to accept appointment as U.S. Consul in Nice. While en route to Nice to take up his new duties, a third daughter died in London.

Aldis served as Consul in Nice until 1871, when he returned to the U.S. to accept appointment as a member of the Southern Claims Commission, which reviewed and made recommendations for reimbursement on claims for property seized and damaged by the Union during the American Civil War. In 1880, he was appointed to the French and American Claims Commission, which resolved claims made by French citizens for property that was seized or destroyed by the belligerent parties during the American Civil War. He served in this position until retiring in 1884.

== Death and burial ==
In retirement, Aldis was a resident of Washington, DC. He died there on June 24, 1891, and was buried at Greenwood Cemetery in St. Albans, Vermont.

== Family ==
In 1836, Aldis married Elizabeth Sterne Lynde (1815-1837). They were the parents of a daughter, Elizabeth, who was born and died in 1836.

After his first wife's death, in 1841 Aldis married Mary Townsend Taylor (1824-1909), with whom he had six daughters and two sons:

- Mary Aldis (1844–1863)
- Miranda Metcalf Aldis (1846–1862)
- Harriet "Hattie" Aldis (1848–1865)
- Helen Lynde Aldis (1849–1935), the wife of Chicago real estate developer Bryan Lathrop
- Cornelia Aldis (1854–1921)
- Owen Franklin Aldis (1852–1925), a Chicago attorney and real estate developer who served on the board of directors for the 1893 World's Columbian Exposition
- Arthur Taylor Aldis (1861–1933), a Chicago real estate developer
- Amy Owen Aldis (1865–1918), the wife of Richards Merry Bradley Jr. (1861–1943), a prominent real estate investor

== Sources ==
=== Books ===
- Adams, Henry (1988). The Letters of Henry Adams. Vol. VI. Cambridge, Massachusetts: Belknap Press. ISBN 978-0-674-52685-3 – via Google Books.
- Grant, Ulysses S. (1998). The Papers of Ulysses S. Grant. Vol. 21. Carbondale, Illinois: Southern Illinois University Press. ISBN 978-0-8093-2197-1.
- LaPlante, Clifford (2025). Bradley Family History: 1637 – Present. Trenton, Georgia: BookLocker.com. ISBN 978-1-959624-49-3 – via Google Books.
- Marquis, Albert Nelson (1911). The Book of Chicagoans. Chicago, Illinois: A. N. Marquis & Company – via Google Books.
- Sowles, Edward A. (1903). Biographical Sketch, Asa Owen Aldis, From Report of Proceedings of the 1901 Annual Meeting of the Vermont Bar Association. Montpelier, Vermont: Argus and Patriot Printing House.
- Whitin, F. H. (1905). The Aldis Family of Dedham, Wrentham, Roxbury and Franklin, Massachusetts, 1640-1800. Dedham, Massachusetts: Dedham Transcript Press. ISBN 978-5-87124-001-4.
- Register of the Colonial Dames of the State of New York. New York, New York: Colonial Dames of the State of New York. 1901.

=== Newspapers ===
- "Death Notice, Miranda Metcalf Aldis". The Burlington Times. Burlington, Vermont. July 10, 1862 – via Newspapers.com.
- "Died: Harriet Townsend Aldis". The Vermont Record. Brattleboro, Vermont. November 17, 1865 – via Newspapers.com.
- "Recent Deaths: The Late Judge Aldis". The Burlington Free Press. Burlington, Vermont. June 26, 1891 – via Newspapers.com.
- "Death Notice, Bryan Lathrop". The New York Times. 14 May 1916.
- "Mrs. Bryan Lathrop: Widow of President of Chicago Orchestral Association". The New York Times. 4 August 1935.

=== Internet ===
- "Vermont Vital Records, 1720-1908, Death Record for Mary Frances Aldis". Ancestry.com. Lehi, Utah: Ancestry.com, LLC. February 3, 1862.

Political offices
| Preceded by New position | Justice of the Vermont Supreme Court; 1857–1865 | Succeeded by Herman R. Beardsley |
