= John Aldis =

American politician (fl. 1650–1680s)

John Aldis was a representative to the Great and General Court of colonial Massachusetts in 1683 and served for 12 years on the Board of Selectmen in Dedham, Massachusetts.

He was the only son of Nathan Aldis and his wife Mary. Aldis had a son also named John. (Note: Records indicate that a John Aldis served in King Phillip's War, but it was more likely to be the son than the father.)

Aldis was admitted as a townsman on January 1, 1650 – 1651. He served as a constable in 1660 and in 1663 was returned to the Jury of Trials of Suffolk County. In 1681, the town voted to collect all deeds and other writings and store them in a box kept by Aldis in order to better preserve them. He was a deacon at the First Church and Parish in Dedham and an ancestor of Asa O. Aldis.

== Works cited ==
- Worthington, Erastus (1827). The history of Dedham: from the beginning of its settlement, in September 1635, to May 1827. Dutton and Wentworth. p. 29.
- Whitin, F.H. (1905). The Aldis family of Dedham, Wrentham, Roxbury and Franklin, Massachusetts, 1640-1800. Рипол Классик. ISBN 978-5-87124-001-4.
- Dwight, Benjamin Woodbridge (1874). The History of the Descendants of John Dwight, of Dedham, Mass. J. F. Trow & son, printers and bookbinders. p. 102.
