= Austrian Lightning Detection & Information System =

ALDIS (Austrian Lightning Detection & Information System) is a sensor network in Austria for the detection and localization of lightning discharge occurring during thunderstorms. In addition to the location of the strike point, the associated peak current is also estimated. ALDIS is a member of the pan-European lightning detection project EUCLID (EUropean Cooperation for LIghtning Detection).

ALDIS was initiated in 1991. Project partners are the OVE (Austrian Electrotechnical Association) and APG (Austrian Power Grid). The detection of lightning, either from cloud-to-ground or within the cloud is accomplished by eight sensors of type LS7002 (Vaisala), which are distributed across the Austrian territory. The performance of a lightning location system is best described by the main performance parameters detection efficiency (DE), location accuracy (LA), and classification accuracy (CA).

In a study by Schwalt et al. (2020) based on data from a high speed video camera and an electric field recording system, it is shown that the DE of flashes (any group of cloud-to-ground, CG, and intracloud, IC, discharges belonging to the same origin in the cloud) exceeds 96%. The LA of the detected cloud-to-ground discharges is about 100 m on average. The accuracy to classify correctly individual lightning events as cloud-to-ground (CG) or intracloud (IC) events is 80-90% (classification accuracy, CA) for the sensor system LS7002.

Since 1998 a radio tower located on top of the Gaisberg (a mountain near Salzburg, Austria) is equipped with instruments in order to record lighting current waveforms and allow to obtain parameters of the lightning strokes to the tower. Thereby obtained data are also applicable for the performance analyses and calibration of the lightning location system ALDIS and lightning research studies in general.

The main goals of the ALDIS project group are:

- to provide lightning data to a number of lighting sensitive businesses and organizations in Austria (meteorological services, insurance companies, etc.)
- to perform research about the origins and effects of lightning which has an impact on the development of lightning protection system
- thunderstorm warning due to automatically monitoring of first indications of approaching thunderstorms. This can be used to send warning messages to critical industries (e.g. handling of explosives)
- long-term archiving of located lightning for statistical evaluations in connection with the determination of the local lightning hazard or risk management according to the valid international lightning protection standards (IEC/EN 62305 series).

Some historical lightning data can be accessed via HORA (Natural Hazard Overview & Risk Assessment Austria, https://hora.gv.at). An overview of the actual lightning activity in Austria is shown on ALDIS mobile.
