= Nathan Aldis =

17th century New England settler

Nathan Aldis was an early settler of Dedham, Massachusetts who served on that town's Board of Selectmen in 1641, 1642, and 1644. He served in a variety of other positions in the town and served as a deacon at First Church and Parish in Dedham. He signed the Dedham Covenant.

In 1642, John Elderkin sold half of his rights to the mill on Mother Brook to Nathaniel Whiting and the other half to John Allin, Aldis, and John Dwight. (Note: Allin was the minister, Aldis the deacon, and Dwight was Whiting's father-in-law.) They operated the mill "in a rather stormy partnership" until 1649 when Whiting became the sole owner.

Aldis and his wife Mary were the parents of John Aldis and ancestors of Asa O. Aldis. His daughter, Mary, married Joshua Fisher. His prosperity diminished in his later years.

== Works cited ==
- Worthington, Erastus (1827). The history of Dedham: from the beginning of its settlement, in September 1635, to May 1827. Dutton and Wentworth.
- Whitin, F.H. (1905). The Aldis family of Dedham, Wrentham, Roxbury and Franklin, Massachusetts, 1640-1800. Рипол Классик. ISBN 978-5-87124-001-4.
- Hanson, Robert Brand (1976). Dedham, Massachusetts, 1635-1890. Dedham Historical Society.
- Worthington, Erastus (1900). Historical sketch of Mother Brook, Dedham, Mass: compiled from various records and papers, showing the diversion of a portion of the Charles River into the Neponset River and the manufactures on the stream, from 1639 to 1900. Dedham, MA: C.G. Wheeler.
