= 1838 Vermont gubernatorial election =

- September 4, 1838
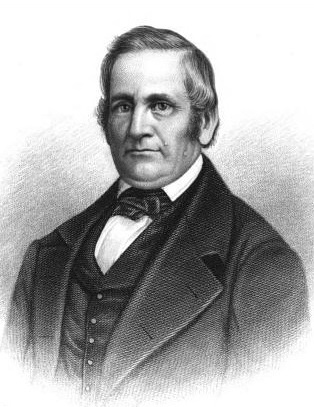

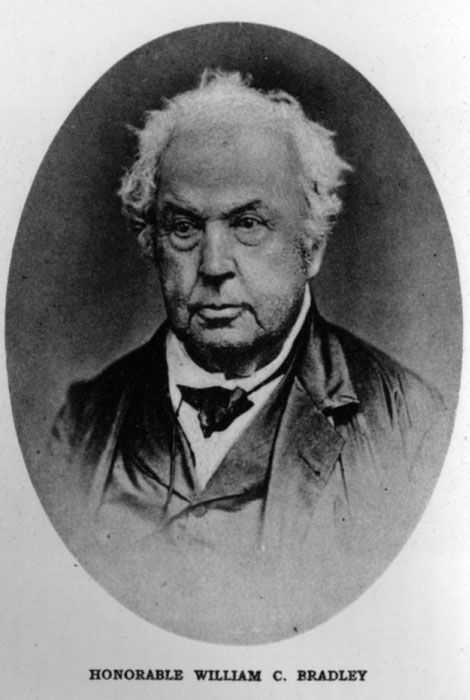
Nominee	Silas H. Jennison	William Czar Bradley
Party	Whig	Democratic
Popular vote	24,738	19,194
Percentage	56.26%	43.65%
- County results Jennison: 50–60% 60–70% 70–80% Bradley: 50–60%
Governor before election
Silas H. Jennison
Whig
Elected Governor
Silas H. Jennison
Whig

The 1838 Vermont gubernatorial election was held on September 4, 1838.

Incumbent Whig Governor Silas H. Jennison defeated Democratic nominee William Czar Bradley with 56.26% of the vote.

== General election ==
=== Candidates ===
- William Czar Bradley, Democratic, former U.S. Representative, Democratic candidate for Governor in 1834, 1835, 1836 and 1837
- Silas H. Jennison, Whig, incumbent Governor

=== Results ===
1838 Vermont gubernatorial election
Party	Candidate	Votes	%	±%
Whig	Silas H. Jennison (inc.)	24,738	56.26%	
Democratic	William Czar Bradley	19,194	43.65%	
Scattering		37	0.08%	
Majority		5,544	12.61%	
Turnout		43,969		
Whig hold		Swing		

=== Results by county ===
County	Silas Hemenway Jennison Whig		William Czar Bradley Democratic		Margin		Total votes cast
County	#	%	#	%	#	%	Total votes cast
Addison	2,180	71.41%	873	28.59%	1,307	42.81%	3,053
Bennington	1,542	51.59%	1,447	48.41%	95	3.18%	2,989
Caledonia	1,779	48.53%	1,887	51.47%	108	-2.95%	3,666
Chittenden	1,731	53.16%	1,525	46.84%	206	6.33%	3,256
Essex	290	47.15%	325	52.85%	35	-5.69%	615
Franklin	1,164	45.27%	1,407	54.73%	243	-9.45%	2,571
Grand Isle	268	58.77%	188	41.23%	80	17.54%	456
Lamoille	689	41.48%	972	58.52%	283	-17.04%	1,661
Orange	2,429	51.16%	2,319	48.84%	110	2.32%	4,748
Orleans	1,229	59.60%	833	40.40%	396	19.20%	2,062
Rutland	2,856	66.31%	1,451	33.69%	1,405	32.62%	4,307
Washington	1,731	43.82%	2,219	56.18%	488	-12.35%	3,950
Windham	2,710	60.08%	1,801	39.92%	909	20.15%	4,511
Windsor	4,140	68.01%	1,947	31.99%	2,193	36.03%	6,087
Totals	24,738	56.31%	19,194	43.69%	5,544	12.62%	43,932
