= 1841 Vermont gubernatorial election =

- September 7, 1841
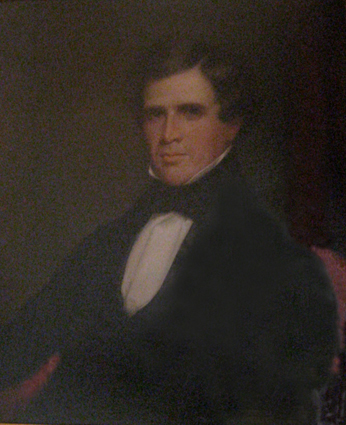

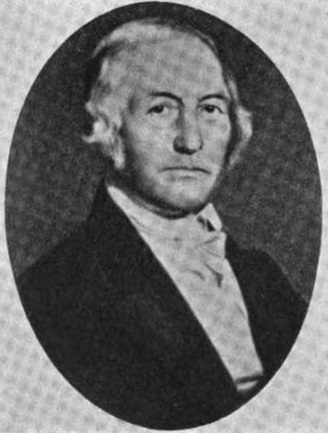
Nominee	Charles Paine	Nathan Smilie	Titus Hutchinson
Party	Whig	Democratic	Liberty
Electoral vote	146	95	9
Popular vote	23,353	21,302	3,039
Percentage	48.71%	44.43%	6.34%
- County results Paine: 40–50% 50–60% 60–70% Smilie: 40–50% 50–60%
Governor before election
Silas H. Jennison
Whig
Elected Governor
Charles Paine
Whig

The 1841 Vermont gubernatorial election was held on September 7, 1841.

Incumbent Whig Governor Silas H. Jennison did not run for re-election.

Whig nominee Charles Paine defeated Democratic nominee Nathan Smilie and Liberty nominee Titus Hutchinson.

Since no candidate received a majority in the popular vote, Paine was elected by the Vermont General Assembly per the state constitution.

== General election ==
=== Candidates ===
- Titus Hutchinson, Liberty, former Chief Judge of the Vermont Supreme Court. Hutchinson was nominated in place of Charles K. Williams, who declined the nomination.
- Charles Paine, Whig, former member of the Vermont House of Representatives, Whig candidate for Governor in 1835
- Nathan Smilie, Democratic, businessman, former member of the Vermont House of Representatives and Vermont Senate, and Democratic candidate for Governor in 1839

=== Results ===
1841 Vermont gubernatorial election (Note: Some sources give the result as Paine 23,582, Smilie 21,693, Hutchinson 3,091, scattering 248. The result given here is that given in the Vermont House Journal.)
Party	Candidate	Votes	%	±%
Whig	Charles Paine	23,353	48.71%	
Democratic	Nathan Smilie	21,302	44.43%	
Liberty	Titus Hutchinson	3,039	6.34%	
Scattering		248	0.52%	
Majority		2,051	4.28%	
Turnout		47,942		

=== Legislative election ===
As no candidate received a majority of the vote, the Vermont General Assembly was required to decide the election, both Houses meeting jointly choosing among the top three vote-getters, Paine, Smilie and Hutchinson. The legislative election was held on October 15, 1841.

Of the four scattering votes, one was cast for William A. Griswold (Whig) and one for Asa G. Hewes, while two were blanks. These votes were not counted.

Legislative election
Party	Candidate	Votes	%
Whig	Charles Paine	146	57.48%
Democratic	Nathan Smilie	95	37.40%
Liberty	Titus Hutchinson	9	3.54%
Scattering and blanks		4	1.58%
Turnout		254	
Whig hold			
