= 1845 Vermont gubernatorial election =

- September 2, 1845
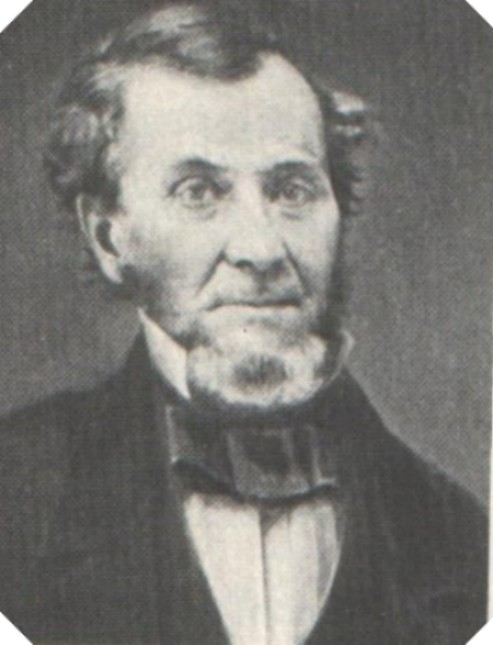

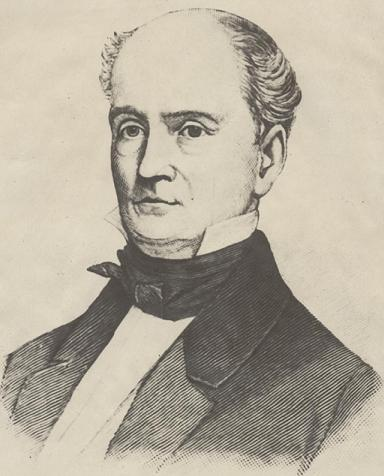

Nominee	William Slade	Daniel Kellogg	William R. Shafter
Party	Whig	Democratic	Liberty
Electoral vote	132	75	14
Popular vote	22,770	18,594	6,534
Percentage	47.18%	38.53%	13.54%
- County results Slade: 40–50% 50–60% 60–70% Kellogg: 40–50% 50–60%
Governor before election
William Slade
Whig
Elected Governor
William Slade
Whig

The 1845 Vermont gubernatorial election was held on September 2, 1845.

Incumbent Whig Governor William Slade defeated Democratic nominee Daniel Kellogg and Liberty nominee William R. Shafter.

Since no candidate received a majority in the popular vote, Slade was elected by the Vermont General Assembly per the state constitution.

== General election ==
=== Candidates ===
- Daniel Kellogg, Democratic, former United States Attorney for the District of Vermont, Democratic nominee for governor in 1843 and 1844
- William R. Shafter, Liberty, farmer and judge, Liberty nominee for governor in 1844
- William Slade, Whig, incumbent governor

=== Results ===
1845 Vermont gubernatorial election (Note: Some sources give Kellogg’s vote as 18,591. The result given here is that given in the Vermont House Journal.)
Party	Candidate	Votes	%	±%
Whig	William Slade (inc.)	22,770	47.18%	
Democratic	Daniel Kellogg	18,594	38.53%	
Liberty	William R. Shafter	6,534	13.54%	
Scattering		362	0.75%	
Majority		4,176	8.65%	
Turnout		48,260		

=== Legislative election ===
As no candidate received a majority of the vote, the Vermont General Assembly was required to decide the election, both Houses meeting jointly choosing among the top three vote-getters, Slade, Kellogg, and Shafter. The legislative election was held on October 9, 1845.

Legislative election
Party	Candidate	Votes	%
Whig	William Slade	132	59.73%
Democratic	Daniel Kellogg	75	33.94%
Liberty	William R. Shafter	14	6.33%
Turnout		221	
Whig hold			
