= 1837 Vermont gubernatorial election =

- September 5, 1837
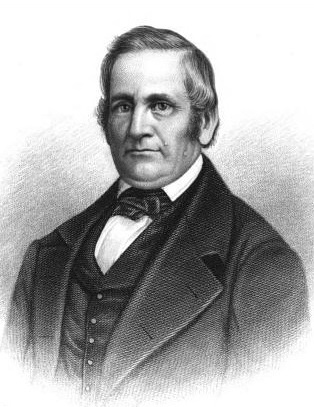

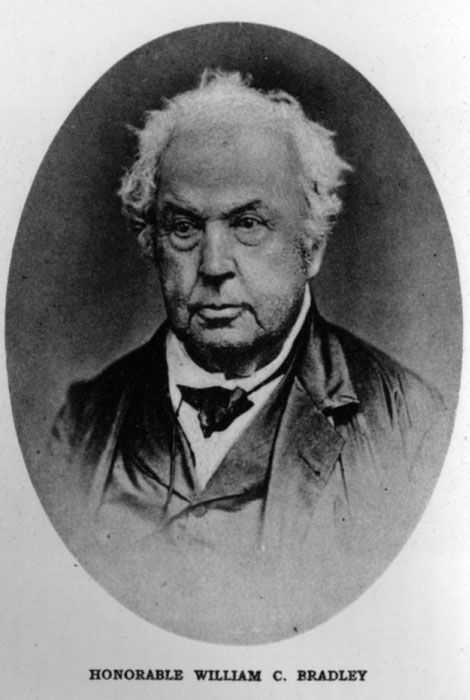
Nominee	Silas H. Jennison	William Czar Bradley
Party	Whig	Democratic
Popular vote	22,260	17,730
Percentage	55.65%	44.33%
- County results Jennison: 50–60% 60–70% Bradley: 50–60%
Governor before election
Silas H. Jennison
Whig
Elected Governor
Silas H. Jennison
Whig

The 1837 Vermont gubernatorial election was held on September 5, 1837.

Incumbent Whig Governor Silas H. Jennison defeated Democratic nominee William Czar Bradley with 55.65% of the vote.

== General election ==
=== Candidates ===
- William Czar Bradley, Democratic, former U.S. Representative, Democratic candidate for Governor in 1834, 1835 and 1836
- Silas H. Jennison, Whig, incumbent Governor

=== Results ===
1837 Vermont gubernatorial election (Note: Some sources give the result as Jennison 22,257, Bradley 17,722. The result given here is that given in the Vermont House Journal.)
Party	Candidate	Votes	%	±%
Whig	Silas H. Jennison (inc.)	22,260	55.65%	
Democratic	William Czar Bradley	17,730	44.33%	
Scattering		8	0.02%	
Majority		4,530	11.33%	
Turnout		39,998		
Whig hold		Swing		

=== Results by county ===
County	Silas Hemenway Jennison Whig		William Czar Bradley Democratic		Margin		Total votes cast
County	#	%	#	%	#	%	Total votes cast
Addison	2,236	66.45%	1,129	33.55%	1,107	32.90%	3,365
Bennington	1,329	50.38%	1,309	49.62%	20	0.76%	2,638
Caledonia	1,557	50.10%	1,551	49.90%	6	0.19%	3,108
Chittenden	1,668	54.98%	1,366	45.02%	302	9.95%	3,034
Essex	209	43.00%	277	57.00%	68	-13.99%	486
Franklin	1,065	54.28%	897	45.72%	168	8.56%	1,962
Grand Isle	247	53.46%	215	46.54%	32	6.93%	462
Lamoille	550	42.94%	731	57.06%	181	-14.13%	1,281
Orange	2,175	47.38%	2,416	52.62%	241	-5.25%	4,591
Orleans	978	53.44%	852	46.56%	126	6.89%	1,830
Rutland	2,478	65.01%	1,334	34.99%	1,144	30.01%	3,812
Washington	1,605	42.78%	2,147	57.22%	542	-14.45%	3,752
Windham	2,601	58.06%	1,879	41.94%	722	16.12%	4,480
Windsor	3,562	68.65%	1,627	31.35%	1,935	37.29%	5,189
Totals	22,260	55.66%	17,730	44.34%	4,530	11.33%	39,990
