= 1846 Vermont gubernatorial election =

- September 1, 1846
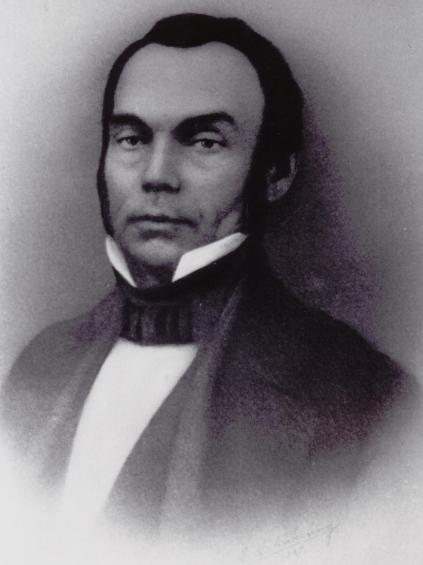

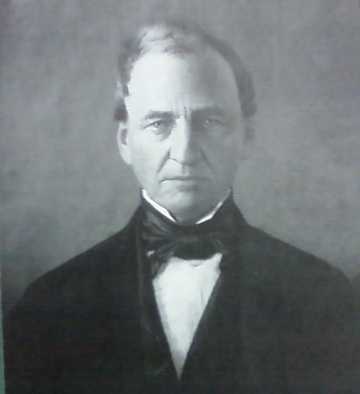

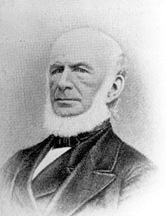
Nominee	Horace Eaton	John Smith	Lawrence Brainerd
Party	Whig	Democratic	Liberty
Electoral vote	136	75	11
Popular vote	23,644	17,877	7,118
Percentage	48.55%	36.71%	14.61%
- County results Eaton: 40–50% 50–60% 60–70% Smith: 40–50%
Governor before election
William Slade
Whig
Elected Governor
Horace Eaton
Whig

The 1846 Vermont gubernatorial election took place on September 1, 1846, and resulted in the election of Whig Party candidate Horace Eaton to a one-year term as governor.

== Statewide elections ==
In the race for governor, incumbent lieutenant governor Horace Eaton defeated Smith, a former member of the United States House of Representatives and Brainerd, a former member of the Vermont House of Representatives.

In the popular vote for lieutenant governor, Whig Leonard Sargeant defeated Democrat Truman B. Ransom and Liberty candidate Jacob Scott. The vote totals were: Sargeant, 23,335 (47.4%); Ransom, 17,985 (36.6%); Scott, 7,801 (15.9%); scattering, 65 (0.1%).

The contest for state treasurer resulted in the election of Whig Elisha P. Jewett, who defeated Democrat Daniel Baldwin and Liberty nominee Zenas Wood. Vote totals in the treasurer's race were: Jewett, 23,324 (48.2%); Baldwin, 17,847 (36.9%); Wood, 6,978 (14.4%); scattering, 192 (0.5%).

Because none of the popular vote winners achieved the 50 percent required by the Constitution of Vermont, the Vermont General Assembly was required to choose the winners. In most cases, the assembly selects the candidate who received a plurality of the vote. In the October 8, 1846 legislative elections, Eaton, Sargeant, and Jewett all won their contests. The reported vote totals were:

=== Governor ===
Necessary for a choice: 111

Results:

Eaton, 136
Smith, 75
Brainerd, 11

=== Lieutenant governor ===
Necessary for a choice: 112

Results:

Sargeant, 138
Ransom, 73
Scott, 12

=== Treasurer ===
Necessary for a choice: 111

Results:

Jewett, 138
Baldwin, 74
Wood, 12

== Results ==
1846 Vermont gubernatorial election
Party	Candidate	Votes	%	±%
Whig	Horace Eaton	23,644	48.55	+1.4
Democratic	John Smith	17,877	36.71	−1.8
Liberty	Lawrence Brainerd	7,118	14.61	−1.1
	Scattering	64	0.13	−0.05
Total votes		48,703	100.00	–
