= 1842 Vermont gubernatorial election =

- September 6, 1842
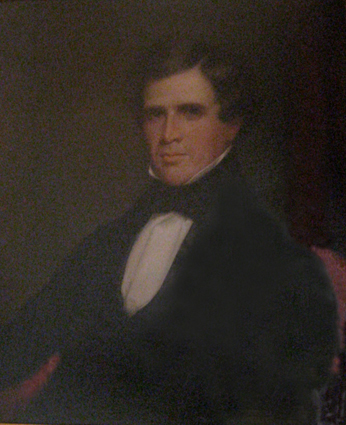

Nominee	Charles Paine	Nathan Smilie
Party	Whig	Democratic
Popular vote	27,167	24,130
Percentage	50.85%	45.17%
- County results Paine: 40–50% 50–60% 60–70% Smilie: 40–50% 50–60%
Governor before election
Charles Paine
Whig
Elected Governor
Charles Paine
Whig

The 1842 Vermont gubernatorial election was held on September 6, 1842.

Incumbent Whig Governor Charles Paine defeated Democratic nominee Nathan Smilie and Liberty nominee Charles K. Williams with 50.85% of the vote.

== General election ==
=== Candidates ===
- Charles Paine, Whig, incumbent Governor
- Nathan Smilie, Democratic, businessman, former member of the Vermont General Assembly, Democratic candidate for Governor in 1839 and 1841
- Charles K. Williams, Liberty, incumbent Chief Judge of the Vermont Supreme Court

=== Results ===
1842 Vermont gubernatorial election (Note: One source gives the result as Paine 27,168, Smilie 24,141, Williams 2,093, scattering 36. The result given here is that given in the Vermont House Journal.)
Party	Candidate	Votes	%	±%
Whig	Charles Paine (inc.)	27,167	50.85%	
Democratic	Nathan Smilie	24,130	45.17%	
Liberty	Charles K. Williams	2,093	3.92%	
Scattering		35	0.07%	
Majority		3,037	5.68%	
Turnout		53,425		
Whig hold		Swing		
