= William Upham =

American attorney and politician (1792–1853)

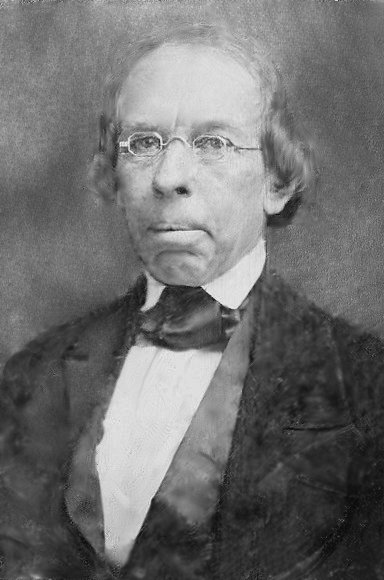
- Restored version of damaged original. Photo by Mathew Brady, circa 1850. Library of Congress Prints and Photographs Division.

United States Senator from Vermont
- In office March 4, 1843 – January 14, 1853
- Preceded by: Samuel C. Crafts
- Succeeded by: Samuel S. Phelps

Chairman of the Vermont Whig State Central Committee
- In office 1838–1841
- Preceded by: Milton Brown
- Succeeded by: Harry Bradley

Member of the Vermont House of Representatives from Montpelier
- In office 1830–1831
- Preceded by: Naum Kelton
- Succeeded by: Azel Spaulding
- In office 1827–1829
- Preceded by: Arunah Waterman
- Succeeded by: Naum Kelton

State's Attorney of Washington County, Vermont
- In office 1829–1830
- Preceded by: Denison Smith
- Succeeded by: Azel Spaulding

Personal details
- Born: August 5, 1792 Leicester, Massachusetts, U.S.
- Died: January 14, 1853 (aged 60) Washington, D.C., U.S.
- Resting place: Congressional Cemetery, Washington, D.C.
- Party: National Republican; Anti-Masonic; Whig
- Spouse: Sarah Keyes (m. 1814–1853, his death)
- Children: 4
- Education: University of Vermont (attended)
- Profession: Attorney
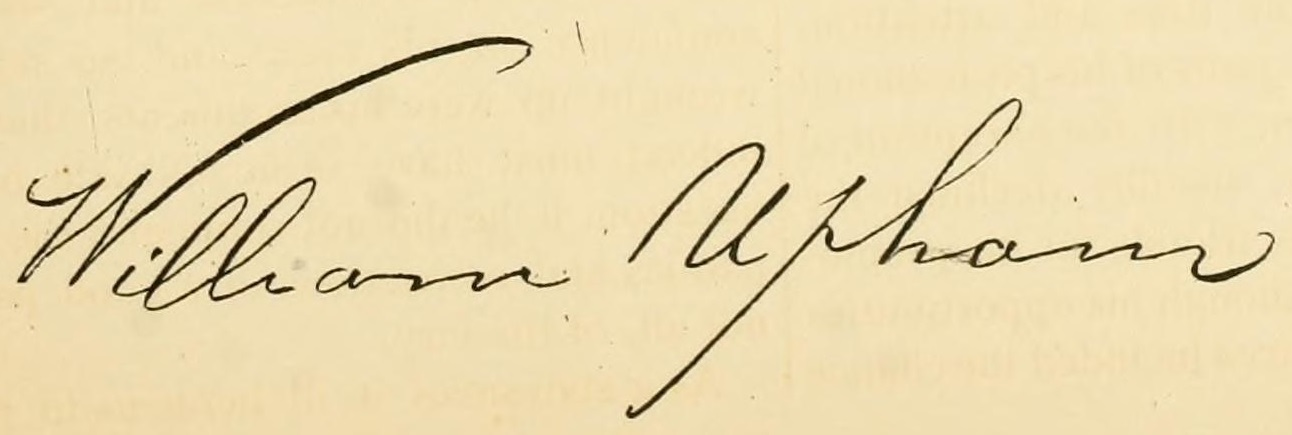
- Signature

William Upham (August 5, 1792 – January 14, 1853) was an American attorney and politician from Montpelier, Vermont. He was most notable for his service as a United States senator from Vermont.

A native of Leicester, Massachusetts, Upham was raised in Leicester and Montpelier, where his family moved in 1802. He was educated locally and worked on the family farm until he lost his right hand in an accident when he was fifteen. He then completed an academic course at Montpelier Academy and with local tutors in preparation to study law. He was admitted to the bar in 1811 and practiced in Montpelier. Upham was an advocate for reform causes including temperance and the abolition of slavery, and changed his party affiliation several times as the anti-slavery movement grew and coalesced, going from the National Republicans to the Anti-Masonic Party to the Whigs in the 1830s. He was a leader of both the Anti-Masons and the Whigs, represented Montpelier in the Vermont House of Representatives twice (1827–1829, 1830–1831), and served a term as State's Attorney of Washington County (1829–1830).

In 1842, Upham was elected to the U.S. Senate. He was reelected in 1848 and served from March 4, 1843 until his death. As a senator, Upham opposed U.S. involvement in the Mexican–American War and the extension of slavery. He became ill in late 1852, and died in Washington, D.C., on January 14, 1853. He was believed to have contracted smallpox and was assumed to be contagious. As a result, his funeral was held quickly, and he was buried at Congressional Cemetery in Washington rather than being returned to Vermont for burial.

== Early life ==
William Upham was born in Leicester, Massachusetts, on August 5, 1792, a son of Samuel Upham and Martha "Patty" (Livermore) Upham. He moved with his family to Montpelier, Vermont, in 1802. Upham worked on his family's farm and attended the district schools until age 15, when he sustained an injury after catching his hand in a cider mill; all the fingers of his right hand were crushed, resulting in the amputation of his whole hand, including the fingers and palm. Upham then followed an academic course with the intent of pursuing a professional career, and attended Montpelier Academy and classes with two private tutors. He attended the University of Vermont, then studied law, first with Cyrus Ward, then with Samuel Prentiss. In 1835, the university awarded Upham the honorary degree of Master of Arts.

== Early career ==
Upham was admitted to the bar in 1811 and commenced practice in Montpelier in partnership with Nicholas Baylies, which they maintained for several years, after which Upham practiced as the senior partner of his own firm. In addition to maintaining a successful practice, Upham also guided the efforts of several prospective lawyers who studied in his office, including Peter T. Washburn.

Upham became active in politics as a member of the National Republican Party and was an advocate for several reform causes including the abolition of slavery and the temperance movement. He was a member of the Vermont House of Representatives from 1827 to 1829 and was State's Attorney for Washington County from 1829 to 1830. In 1830 he was again elected to the Vermont House of Representatives, and he served until 1831. In the early 1830s, Upham joined the new Anti-Masonic Party and he served as president of its 1832 Vermont state convention.

In 1834, Upham was the unsuccessful Whig and Anti-Masonic nominee for the United States House of Representatives in Vermont's 5th District. The highest finishers were the Democratic nominee, Isaac Fletcher and Upham. Because neither received a majority, a second election was held; Upham declined to continue as a candidate, and the election was won by Whig and Anti-Mason Henry Fisk Janes, who defeated Fletcher. In the mid 1830s, Upham served as chairman of Vermont's Whig Party. In 1838, he was again an unsuccessful candidate for Congress, losing to Isaac Fletcher. In 1840, he campaigned throughout the state for Whig presidential nominee William Henry Harrison, who was elected.

== United States senator ==
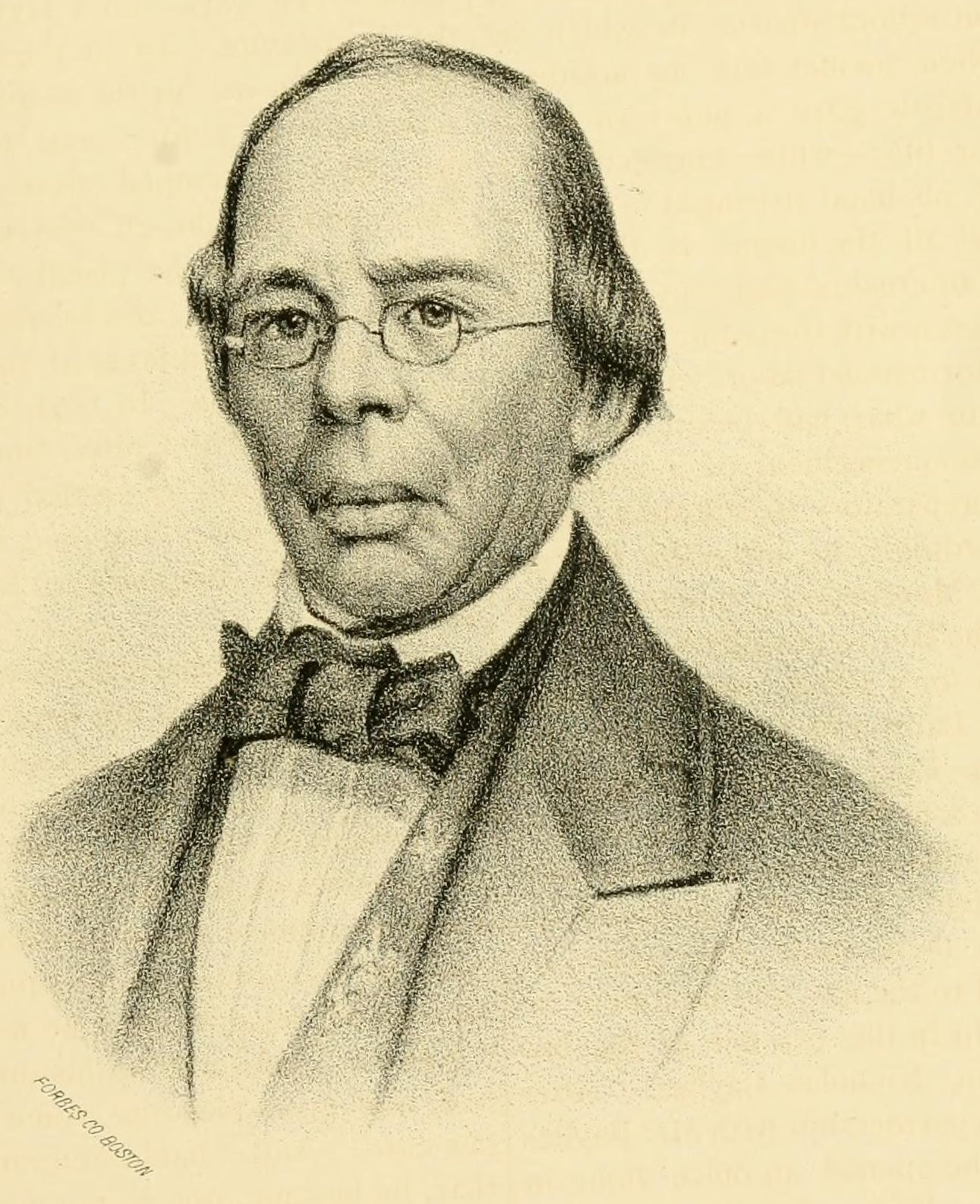
Illustration of Upham circa 1850, based on contemporary photo

In 1842 Samuel Prentiss resigned his seat in the U.S. Senate in order to accept appointment as judge of the United States District Court for the District of Vermont. Samuel C. Crafts was appointed to fill the vacancy, and served until the end of the term to which Prentiss had been elected, April 23, 1842, to March 3, 1843. Crafts was not a candidate for a full term, and Upham was the successful Whig candidate for the seat. He was reelected in 1848 and served from March 4, 1843, until his death. While in the Senate, he was chairman of the Committee on Agriculture (28th Congress) and the Committee on Pensions (29th Congress).

As an opponent of slavery, Upham argued against U.S. involvement in the Mexican–American War, and introduced resolutions calling for immediate withdrawal from Mexico or a quick conclusion to the war. He was an opponent of allowing slavery to extend beyond where it already existed, and voted against the Fugitive Slave Act of 1850 and other details related to the Compromise of 1850. He was also a proponent of the Wilmot Proviso, which would have prevented the U.S. from extending slavery into any territory acquired as a result of the Mexican War.

== Death and burial ==
Upham died of smallpox in Washington, D.C., on January 14, 1853; because he was believed to be contagious, his funeral was held quickly, and his remains were not returned to Vermont. He was buried at Congressional Cemetery.

== Quotations ==
- "...Slavery is a crime against humanity and a sore evil in the body politic."

== Family ==
In 1814, Upham married Sarah Keyes; they were the parents of five children, four of whom lived to adulthood: William Keyes Upham (1817–1865), Charles Carroll Upham (1819–1868), Sarah Sumner (Upham) Langdon (1821–1888) and Mary Annette Upham (1825–1899), who died in the Windsor Hotel fire.

=== Rice family and relations ===
Upham was a descendant of Edmund Rice, an English immigrant to Massachusetts Bay Colony, as follows:

- William Upham, son of

- Martha Livermore (1768–1832), daughter of
- James Livermore, Jr. (1743–1825), son of
- Elizabeth Rice (1713–1799), daughter of

- Elisha Rice (1679–1761), son of
- Thomas Rice (1626–1681), son of

- Edmund Rice (1594–1663)

== See also ==
- List of members of the United States Congress who died in office (1790–1899)

U.S. Senate
Preceded by Samuel C. Crafts	U.S. senator (Class 3) from Vermont; March 4, 1843 – January 14, 1853; Served alongside: Samuel S. Phelps and Solomon Foot	Succeeded by Samuel S. Phelps
