= 1847 Vermont gubernatorial election =

- September 7, 1847
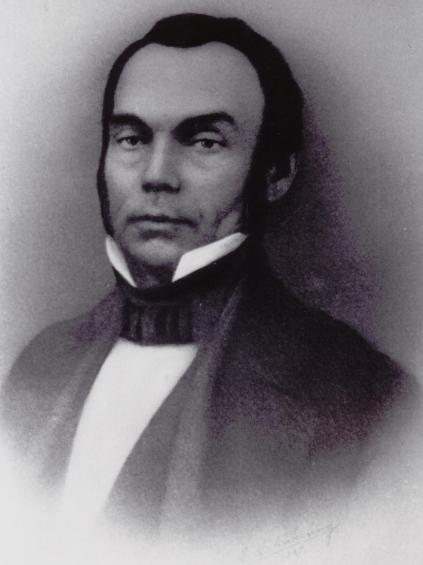

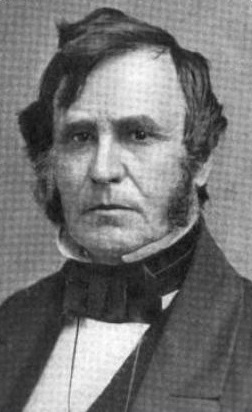

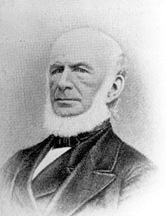
Nominee	Horace Eaton	Paul Dillingham	Lawrence Brainerd
Party	Whig	Democratic	Liberty
Electoral vote	125	85	19
Popular vote	22,455	18,601	6,926
Percentage	46.68%	38.67%	14.39%
- County results Eaton: 40–50% 50–60% 60–70% Dillingham: 40–50%
Governor before election
Horace Eaton
Whig
Elected Governor
Horace Eaton
Whig

The 1847 Vermont gubernatorial election took place on September 7, 1847, and resulted in the reelection of Whig Party candidate Horace Eaton to another one-year term as governor, his second.

In the election for governor, Eaton, who had succeeded from lieutenant governor in 1846, was elected to his second one-year term, defeating Democrat Paul Dillingham, Liberty candidate Lawrence Brainerd, and Know Nothing Reuben C. Benton.

In the lieutenant governor's election, Whig Leonard Sargeant was elected to a second one-year term with 46.5% of the vote to Democrat Charles K. Field's 39.0%, and the Liberty Party Jacob Scott's 14.3%, with a handful of votes cast for write-in candidates.

For treasurer, Whig George Howes received 46.4%, Democratic nominee received Jeremiah T. Marston 39.1%, and Liberty nominee Zenas Wood had 14.3%, with a few ballots cast for write-ins.

Because none of the candidates received the popular vote majority required by the Vermont Constitution, the contests were formally decided by the Vermont General Assembly. In the October 14 vote, 229 representatives and senators took part, so 115 votes were required to win. Eaton, Sargeant, and Howes were all elected on the first ballot. Eaton received 125 votes, Sargeant 124, and Howes 124.

== Results ==
1847 Vermont gubernatorial election
Party	Candidate	Votes	%	±%
Whig	Horace Eaton (incumbent)	22,455	46.68%	
Democratic	Paul Dillingham	18,601	38.67%	
Liberty	Lawrence Brainerd	6,926	14.39%	
Know Nothing	Reuben C. Benton	98	0.20%	
Write-in	Other	21	0.06%	
Total votes		48,101	100.00%	
