= Horace Eaton =

American politician

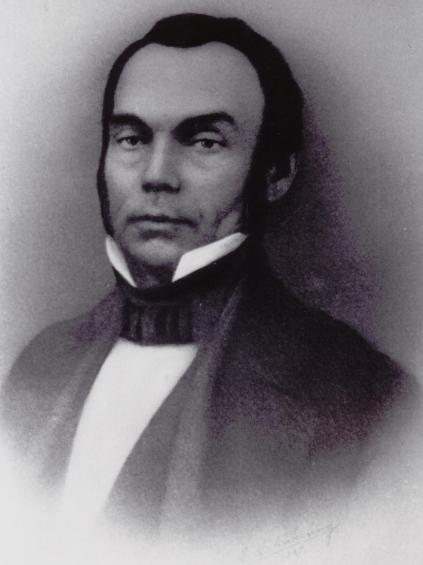

18th Governor of Vermont
- In office October 9, 1846 – October 1848
- Lieutenant: Leonard Sargeant; Robert Pierpoint
- Preceded by: William Slade
- Succeeded by: Carlos Coolidge

14th Lieutenant Governor of Vermont
- In office October 13, 1843 – October 9, 1846
- Governor: John Mattocks; William Slade
- Preceded by: Waitstill R. Ranney
- Succeeded by: Leonard Sargeant

President pro tempore of the Vermont Senate
- In office 1841–1843
- Preceded by: None (position created)
- Succeeded by: Ebenezer N. Briggs

Member of the Vermont Senate from Franklin County
- In office 1839–1843 Serving with Timothy Foster, Joseph Waterman (1839, 1840); Alvah Sabin, Moses Fisk (1841); William Green, Homer E. Hubbell (1842)
- Preceded by: Nathan Smilie, Homer E. Hubbell, Austin Sears
- Succeeded by: Alvah Sabin, George Green, Jonathan H. Hubbard
- In office 1837–1838 Serving with Nathan Smilie, Timothy Foster
- Preceded by: Nathan Smilie, Joshua W. Sheldon, Homer E. Hubbell
- Succeeded by: Nathan Smilie, Homer E. Hubbell, Austin Sears

Personal details
- Born: June 22, 1804 Barnard, Vermont, US
- Died: July 4, 1855 (aged 51) Middlebury, Vermont, US
- Resting place: Enosburg Center Cemetery, Enosburg, Vermont, US
- Party: Whig
- Spouse(s): Cordelia H. Fuller; Edna Palmer
- Children: 2
- Education: Middlebury College; Castleton Medical College
- Profession: Medical doctor

Horace Eaton (June 22, 1804 – July 4, 1855) was an American Whig politician, a medical doctor, the 14th lieutenant governor of Vermont, and the 18th governor of Vermont.

== Biography ==
Eaton was born in Barnard, Vermont, on June 22, 1804. He graduated from Middlebury College in 1825, taught at Middlebury Academy for two years, then moved to Enosburg, a village in Berkshire, Vermont, where his father practiced medicine. He studied with his father while attending Castleton Medical College; Eaton graduated in 1828, and then joined his father's practice. He was married twice; first to Cordelia H. Fuller with whom he had two children, and then to Edna Palmer.

== Career ==
Eaton was town clerk of Enosburg. He was a member of the Vermont Senate in 1837 and from 1839 to 1843.

Eaton was elected the lieutenant governor of Vermont and served from 1843 to 1846.

Eaton served as the eighteenth governor of Vermont from 1846 to 1848. He was a delegate to the state Constitutional Convention in 1848. During his administration, he opposed the admission of slave states to the Union and to the Mexican War.

Eaton played a key role in the creation of the state Superintendent of Public Instruction position, and he was the first one to hold it, serving from 1845 to 1850. In 1848 he was appointed professor of chemistry and natural history at Middlebury, and held the chair until 1855.

== Death ==
Eaton died in Middlebury, Vermont, on July 4, 1855, the 79th anniversary of American independence; and is interred at Enosburg Center Cemetery in Enosburg, Vermont.

Party political offices
Preceded by Waitstill R. Ranney	Whig nominee for Lieutenant Governor of Vermont; 1843, 1844, 1845	Succeeded by Leonard Sargeant
Preceded by William Slade	Whig nominee for Governor of Vermont; 1846, 1847	Succeeded by Carlos Coolidge
Political offices
Preceded by Waitstill R. Ranney	Lieutenant Governor of Vermont; 1843–1846	Succeeded by Leonard Sargeant
Preceded by William Slade	Governor of Vermont; 1846–1848	Succeeded by Carlos Coolidge
