= 1844 Vermont gubernatorial election =

- September 3, 1844
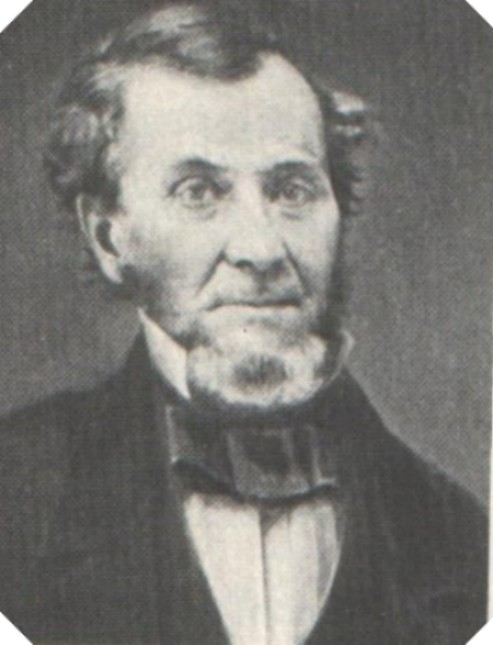

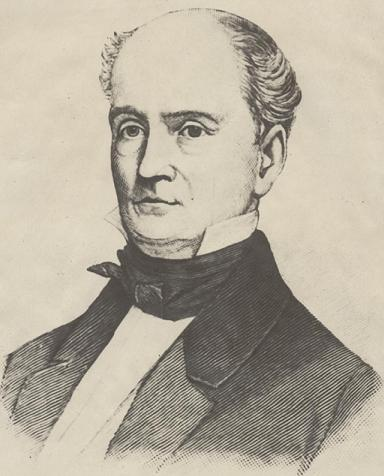

Nominee	William Slade	Daniel Kellogg	William R. Shafter
Party	Whig	Democratic	Liberty
Popular vote	28,265	20,930	5,618
Percentage	51.53%	38.16%	10.24%
- County results Slade: 40–50% 50–60% 60–70% Kellogg: 40–50% 50–60%
Governor before election
John Mattocks
Whig
Elected Governor
William Slade
Whig

The 1844 Vermont gubernatorial election was held on September 3, 1844.

Following the suicide of his son, George, in January, incumbent Whig Governor John Mattocks declined to run for re-election.

Whig nominee William Slade defeated Democratic nominee Daniel Kellogg and Liberty nominee William R. Shafter with 51.53% of the vote.

== General election ==
=== Candidates ===
- Daniel Kellogg, Democratic, former United States Attorney for the District of Vermont, Democratic nominee for governor in 1843
- William R. Shafter, Liberty, farmer and judge
- William Slade, Whig, former U.S. representative

=== Results ===
1844 Vermont gubernatorial election
Party	Candidate	Votes	%	±%
Whig	William Slade	28,265	51.53%	
Democratic	Daniel Kellogg	20,930	38.16%	
Liberty	William R. Shafter	5,618	10.24%	
Scattering		34	0.06%	
Majority		7,335	13.37%	
Turnout		54,847		
Whig hold		Swing		
