= Waitstill =

Waitstill is a given name. Notable people with the name include:

- Waitstill R. Ranney (1791–1853), American physician and politician
- Waitstill Sharp (1902–1983), American Unitarian minister
- Waitstill Winthrop (1642–1717), American magistrate and politician
