= Daniel Kellogg (judge) =

American judge (1791-1875)

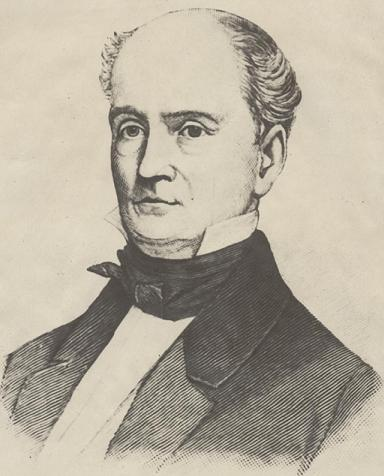

Associate Justice of the Vermont Supreme Court
- In office 1845–1850
- Preceded by: William Hebard
- Succeeded by: None (Size of court reduced)
- In office 1843–1843
- Preceded by: William Hebard
- Succeeded by: William Hebard

United States Attorney for the District of Vermont
- In office 1829–1841
- Preceded by: William A. Griswold
- Succeeded by: Charles Davis

Personal details
- Born: February 10, 1791 Amherst, Massachusetts, U.S.
- Died: May 10, 1875 (aged 84) Brattleboro, Vermont, U.S.
- Resting place: Prospect Hill Cemetery, Brattleboro, Vermont
- Party: Democratic-Republican; Democratic; National Union
- Spouse(s): Jane McAfee (d. 1827); Merab Ann Bradley (d. 1845); Miranda M. Aldis (d. 1887)
- Children: 4 (including George Bradley Kellogg)
- Education: Williams College
- Profession: Lawyer

Daniel Kellogg (February 10, 1791 – May 10, 1875) was an American public official who served as a justice of the Vermont Supreme Court and in several other positions.

== Early life ==
Daniel Kellogg was born in Amherst, Massachusetts on February 10, 1791, the son of Daniel and Mercy (Eastman) Kellogg. He graduated from Williams College in 1810, and was a member of Phi Beta Kappa. He studied law, was admitted to the bar, and commenced practice in Rockingham, Vermont in 1814.

== Career ==
A Democratic-Republican and later a Democrat, Kellogg served as Windham County State's Attorney and Judge of Probate. He also served as secretary to Governors Cornelius P. Van Ness (1823-1826) and Ezra Butler (1826-1828).

Having been active as an officer in the Vermont Militia, Kellogg was appointed adjutant general, and served from 1822 to 1824.

In 1829 President Andrew Jackson appointed Kellogg as United States Attorney for the District of Vermont and he served until the end of the Martin Van Buren administration in 1841. Kellogg also ran unsuccessfully for the United States House of Representatives in 1833 and 1840.

Kellogg served as president of the Vermont Constitutional Convention in 1843. He declined appointment to the Vermont Supreme Court in the same year, and also ran unsuccessfully for governor, losing the election to John Mattocks.

He ran again for governor in 1844 and 1845, losing both times to William Slade. Kellogg served in the Vermont House of Representatives in 1845.

In 1845 Kellogg was appointed to the Vermont Supreme Court. He served on the court until resigning in 1850.

Kellogg resumed the practice of law after leaving the court. In 1854 he relocated to Brattleboro. He was president of the Bellows Falls National Bank and a trustee of the Vermont Asylum for the Insane.

He was a Unionist during the American Civil War. He served as presidential elector in 1864, and cast his ballot for Abraham Lincoln and Andrew Johnson. He also served in the Vermont State Senate from 1865 to 1866.

== Death and burial ==
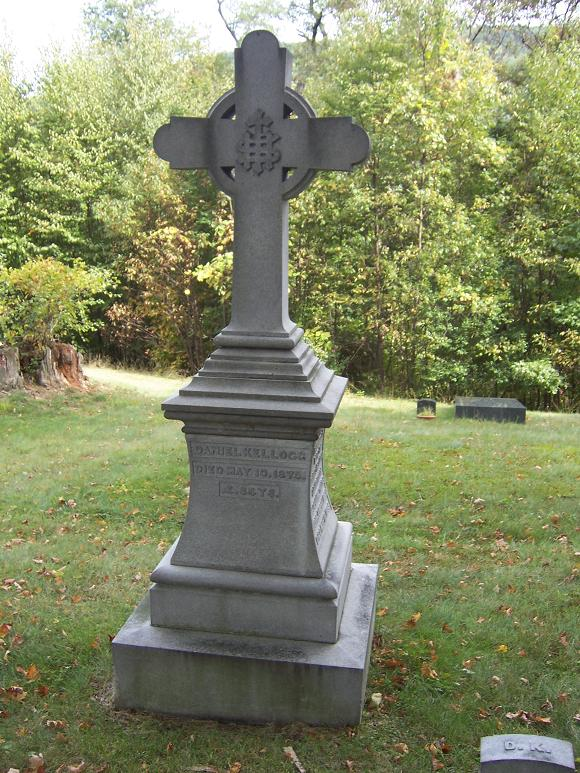
Daniel Kellogg's grave marker.

Kellogg died in Brattleboro on May 10, 1875. He was buried at Prospect Hill Cemetery in Brattleboro.

== Honors ==
In 1853 Kellogg received an honorary Doctor of Laws (LL.D.) degree from the University of Vermont.

== Legacy ==
Daniel Kellogg's law library is included in the Stephen Row Bradley and William Czar Bradley Papers, which were donated to the University of Vermont by William Bradley Willard in 2002.

== Family ==
Kellogg was first married to Jane McAfee of Rockingham. After her 1827 death he married Merab Ann Bradley of Westminster, the daughter of Congressman William Czar Bradley and granddaughter of Senator Stephen Row Bradley.

After Merab Bradley Kellogg's death in 1845 Daniel Kellogg married Miranda M. Aldis of St. Albans, who survived him. Miranda Kellogg was the daughter of Vermont Chief Justice Asa Aldis, and sister of Associate Justice Asa O. Aldis.

Kellogg's children included Henry (1823-1844); George B. (1825-1875); Sarah B. (1831-1909); Daniel, Jr. (1834-1918).

Henry Kellogg graduated from Williams College in 1843 and was a law student in the office of William Czar Bradley when he drowned while swimming in the Connecticut River.

George Bradley Kellogg was an attorney who served as Adjutant General of Vermont from 1854 to 1859 and Lieutenant Colonel of the 1st Vermont Cavalry Regiment during the American Civil War.

Daniel Kellogg, Jr. resided in Brattleboro and held local offices including Postmaster.

Sarah B. Kellogg married Henry A. Willard, the proprietor of the famed Willard Hotel in Washington, D.C.

Party political offices
Preceded by Nathan Smilie	Democratic nominee for Governor of Vermont; 1843, 1844, 1845	Succeeded by John Smith
Military offices
Preceded by David Fay	Vermont Adjutant General; 1822–1824	Succeeded by Isaac Fletcher
