= D. Azro A. Buck =

American politician (1789–1841)

Daniel Azro Ashley Buck
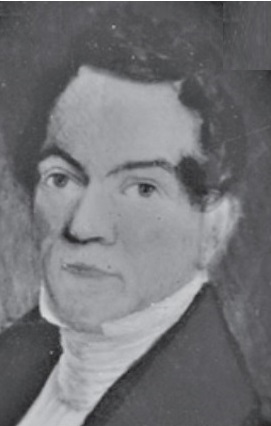
- Likeness by unknown artist, circa 1822

Speaker of the Vermont House of Representatives
- In office 1829–1830
- Preceded by: Robert B. Bates
- Succeeded by: Robert B. Bates

Member of the U.S. House of Representatives from Vermont's 5th district
- In office March 4, 1827 – March 3, 1829
- Preceded by: John Mattocks
- Succeeded by: William Cahoon

Speaker of the Vermont House of Representatives
- In office 1825–1826
- Preceded by: Isaac Fletcher
- Succeeded by: Robert B. Bates

Member of the U.S. House of Representatives from Vermont's 4th district
- In office March 4, 1823 – March 3, 1825
- Preceded by: Elias Keyes
- Succeeded by: Ezra Meech

Speaker of the Vermont House of Representatives
- In office 1820–1822
- Preceded by: William A. Griswold
- Succeeded by: George Edward Wales

Member of the Vermont House of Representatives
- In office 1816–1826; 1828–1830; 1833–1835

Personal details
- Born: April 19, 1789 Norwich, Vermont Republic
- Died: December 24, 1841 (aged 52) Washington, D.C., U.S.
- Resting place: Congressional Cemetery; Washington, D.C.
- Party: Adams-Clay Republican
- Spouse: Philomela C. Dodge Buck
- Children: Daniel Buck; Elizabeth Morse Buck; Ben Buck; Londus Buck
- Parent(s): Daniel Buck; Content (Ashley) Buck
- Education: United States Military Academy; Middlebury College; Dartmouth College
- Profession: Politician; Lawyer

Military service
- Branch/service: United States Army
- Years of service: 1808–1811; 1812–1815
- Rank: Captain
- Unit: 31st Infantry Regiment
- Wars: War of 1812

Daniel Azro Ashley Buck (April 19, 1789 – December 24, 1841) was an American lawyer and politician in the U.S. state of Vermont. He served as a U.S. representative from Vermont and as Speaker of the Vermont House of Representatives.

== Early life ==
Buck was born in Norwich in the Vermont Republic, the son of U.S. Representative Daniel Buck and Content (Ashley) Buck. As a child he moved with his parents to Chelsea. He attended the common schools and graduated from Middlebury College in 1807 with classmates William Slade and Stephen Royce. He graduated first in his class from the United States Military Academy in 1808, and was commissioned a lieutenant in the Engineer Corps of the United States Army. For the next three years, he served as an engineer in the construction of Fort Wood on Bedloe's Island. He resigned his commission in August 1811 and began the study of law.

In October 1812 he was appointed a second lieutenant in the 3rd Artillery, which he declined. He instead raised a volunteer company of rangers, and was appointed a captain of the 31st Infantry in April 1813. He was honorably discharged on June 15, 1815. Following his discharge, he was admitted to the bar, and began the practice of law in Chelsea. He received the honorary degree of Master of Arts from Dartmouth College in 1823.

== Political career ==
Buck held various political positions in Vermont, and was elected a member of the State house of representatives in 1816. He served in the State House three times, from 1816 to 1826, 1828–1830 and 1833–1835. He was Speaker of the House from 1820 to 1822, 1825–1826 and in 1829.

He was State's Attorney for Orange County from 1819 to 1822 and 1830–1834. He was a presidential elector in 1820. He was elected as an Adams-Clay Republican candidate to the Eighteenth Congress, serving from March 4, 1823, to March 3, 1825. He was then elected to the Twentieth Congress, serving from March 4, 1827, to March 3, 1829. He was an unsuccessful candidate for renomination in 1828. He was a trustee of the University of Vermont and Norwich University.

After leaving Congress he moved to Washington, D.C., and served as a clerk in the War Department from 1835 to 1839. He then served as a clerk in the Treasury Department in 1840.

Buck died in Washington, D.C., on December 24, 1841, and is interred in the Congressional Cemetery in Washington D.C.

== Family life ==
Buck married Philometa C. Dodge on November 10, 1816. Their children were Daniel Buck, Elizabeth Morse Buck, Ben Buck and Londus Buck.

Political offices
Preceded by William A. Griswold	Speaker of the Vermont House of Representatives; 1820–1822	Succeeded by George E. Wales
Preceded by Elias Keyes	Member of the U.S. House of Representatives from Vermont's 4th congressional district March 4, 1823 – March 3, 1825	Succeeded by Elias Keyes
Preceded by Isaac Fletcher	Speaker of the Vermont House of Representatives; 1825–1826	Succeeded by Robert B. Bates
Preceded by John Mattocks	Member of the U.S. House of Representatives from Vermont's 5th congressional district March 4, 1827 – March 3, 1829	Succeeded by William Cahoon
Preceded by Robert B. Bates	Speaker of the Vermont House of Representatives; 1829–1830	Succeeded by Robert B. Bates
