= Samuel S. Phelps =

American lawyer and politician (1793–1855)

Samuel Shethar Phelps
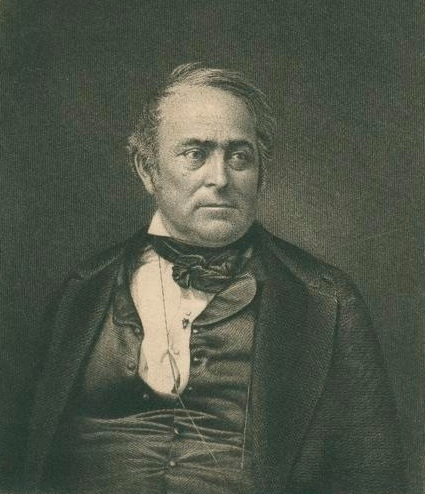

United States Senator from Vermont
- In office January 17, 1853 – March 16, 1854
- Appointed by: Erastus Fairbanks
- Preceded by: William Upham
- Succeeded by: Lawrence Brainerd
- In office March 4, 1839 – March 3, 1851
- Preceded by: Benjamin Swift
- Succeeded by: Solomon Foot

Associate Justice of the Vermont Supreme Court
- In office 1832–1838
- Preceded by: John C. Thompson
- Succeeded by: Milo Lyman Bennett

Member of the Vermont House of Representatives from Middlebury
- In office 1821–1832
- Preceded by: Jonathan Hagar
- Succeeded by: Edward D. Barber

Personal details
- Born: May 13, 1793 Litchfield, Connecticut, U.S.
- Died: March 25, 1855 (aged 61) Middlebury, Vermont, U.S.
- Party: Whig
- Spouse(s): Frances Shurtleff Phelps; Electa Satterlee Phelps
- Children: 3, including Edward John Phelps
- Education: Yale University; Litchfield Law School
- Profession: Attorney

Samuel Shethar Phelps (May 13, 1793 – March 25, 1855) was an American lawyer and politician. He was a United States senator from Vermont, and a member of the Whig Party.

== Biography ==
Coat of Arms of Samuel S. Phelps

Phelps was born in Litchfield, Connecticut, to John Phelps (1756–1833), an American Revolutionary War soldier and great-great-grandson of William Phelps. Samuel S. Phelps graduated from Yale University in 1811. He studied law at Litchfield Law School and in the office of Horatio Seymour, and was admitted to the bar. He served as a military paymaster during the War of 1812. Following the war, he settled in Middlebury, Vermont, and began the practice of law.

Phelps began his political career serving in the Vermont House of Representatives from 1821 to 1832. He was a judge on the Vermont Supreme Court from 1832 to 1838, succeeding to the position left vacant by the death of John C. Thompson. In 1839 he was elected as a Whig to the United States Senate, and he served until 1851. He chaired several committees while serving in the Senate, including the Committee on the Militia, Committee on Revolutionary Claims, and the Committee on Patents and the Patent Office.

Phelps returned to the United States Senate on January 17, 1853, having been appointed to fill the unexpired term of Senator William Upham, who had died. He served until March 16, 1854, when the Senate resolved that he was not entitled to the seat on the grounds that he had been legally appointed by the Governor of Vermont when the Vermont General Assembly was not in session, but once the legislature was in session, it was incumbent on legislators to choose a successor.

== Family life ==
Phelps was married to Frances Shurtleff Phelps and they had three children, Edward John Phelps, James Shether Phelps and Charles Henry Phelps.

Phelps died in Middlebury on March 25, 1855. He was buried at West Cemetery in Middlebury.

== Published works ==
- "Mr. Phelps’ Appeal to the People of Vermont" by Samuel S. Phelps, published in the American Whig Review 12 (July 1850): 93-98, Middlebury, VT, 1846.
- "Mr. Phelps' Rejoinder to Mr. Slade's "Reply."", printed by J. & G.S. Gideon, Washington, D.C., no date, but ca 1846.

U.S. Senate
Preceded by Benjamin Swift	U.S. senator (Class 1) from Vermont; March 4, 1839 – March 3, 1851; Served alongside: Samuel Prentiss, Samuel C. Crafts and William Upham	Succeeded by Solomon Foot
Preceded by William Upham	U.S. senator (Class 3) from Vermont; January 17, 1853 – March 16, 1854; Served alongside: Solomon Foot	Succeeded by Lawrence Brainerd
