= William C. Bradley =

American politician (1782-1867)

William Czar Bradley
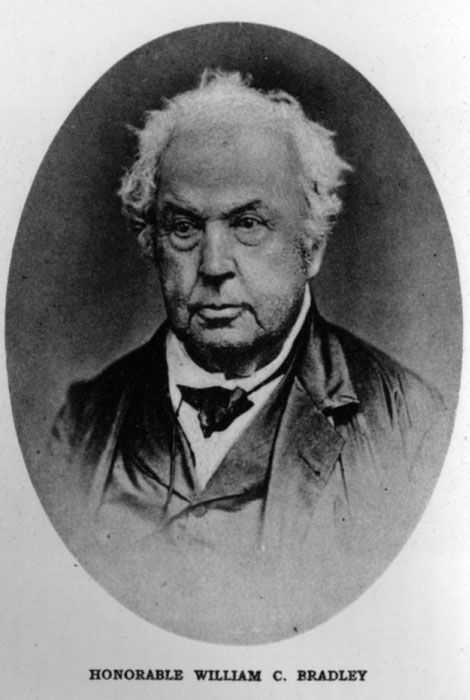

Member of the U.S. House of Representatives from Vermont
- In office March 4, 1813 – March 4, 1815
- Preceded by: District established
- Succeeded by: Daniel Chipman
- Constituency: At-large district
- In office March 4, 1823 – March 3, 1827
- Preceded by: Phineas White (2nd); Rollin C. Mallary (1st)
- Succeeded by: Rollin C. Mallary (2nd); Jonathan Hunt (1st)
- Constituency: 2nd district (1823-25); 1st district (1825-27)

Personal details
- Born: William Czar Bradley; March 23, 1782 Westminster, Vermont Republic
- Died: March 3, 1867 (aged 84) Westminster, Vermont, U.S.
- Resting place: Old Westminster Cemetery in Westminster
- Party: Adams, Adams-Clay Republican
- Spouse: Sarah Richards
- Children: Jonathan Dorr Bradley

William Czar Bradley (March 23, 1782 – March 3, 1867) was an American lawyer and politician. He served three terms as U.S. Representative from Vermont from 1813 to 1815, then again from 1823 to 1827.

== Biography ==
Born in Westminster in the Vermont Republic, Bradley was the son of United States Senator Stephen Row Bradley. Bradley received his early education in the schools of Cheshire, Connecticut, and Charlestown, New Hampshire. As a child prodigy, he entered Yale College for a short time at the age of thirteen, but was expelled for pranks.

=== Family ===
Also in 1802 Bradley married Sarah Richards, the daughter of Mark Richards, who served in Congress and as lieutenant governor.

=== Legal career ===
He studied law, was admitted to the bar and commenced practice in Westminster in 1802. He served as prosecuting attorney for Windham County, as a member of the Vermont House of Representatives.

=== Political career ===
He was member of the Governor's council.

Bradley was elected as a Democratic-Republican to the Thirteenth Congress, serving from March 4, 1813, to March 3, 1815. Bradley was an agent of the United States under the Treaty of Ghent to fix the boundary line between Maine and Canada from 1815 to 1820. He served again in the United States Congress when was elected as an Adams-Clay Democratic-Republican to the Eighteenth Congress and as an Adams to the Nineteenth Congress, serving from March 4, 1823, to March 3, 1827.

=== Later career ===
After leaving Congress, Bradley resumed the practice of law. He was an unsuccessful candidate for Governor several times, running as a Democratic candidate in 1830, 1834 and 1838. (Daniel Kellogg, the husband of Bradley's daughter Merab, was the Democratic nominee for governor in 1843, 1844 and 1845.) Bradley then ran as an unsuccessful Free Soil Party candidate in 1848, and an unsuccessful candidate on the Fremont ticket in 1856.

He served as presidential elector on the Republican ticket in 1856, and cast his vote for John C. Fremont, the first presidential candidate of the Republican Party. Bradley served as member of the State constitutional convention in 1857. He retired from the practice of law in 1858.

== Death and legacy ==
Bradley died in Westminster on March 3, 1867, and is interred in the Old Westminster Cemetery in Westminster.

A bust of Bradley was sculpted around 1860 by sculptor Larkin Goldsmith Mead, and is on display in the Vermont Historical Society museum.

Bradley's law office in Westminster was deeded to the State of Vermont in 1998. Bradley used the law office from 1810 until his retirement in 1858; the law office had been undisturbed until it was deeded to the state. In July 2001 The William Czar Bradley Law Office was opened to the public.

== Published works ==
Bradley began writing poetry at an early age, and published his first book, "The Rights of Youth," at the age of twelve.

- "Verses in a Watch," in John Walter Coates & Frederick Tucker (eds.), Vermont Verse: An Anthology 32 (Brattleboro, Vermont: Stephen Daye Press, 1932)
- "A Ballad of Judgment and Mercy," in A.J. Sanborn (ed.), Green Mountain Poets 158-160 (Claremont, New Hampshire: Claremont Manufacturing Co., 1872)

Party political offices
Preceded by Ezra Meech	Democratic nominee for Governor of Vermont; 1834, 1835, 1836, 1837, 1838	Succeeded by Nathan Smilie
U.S. House of Representatives
Preceded by District created	Member of the U.S. House of Representatives from Vermont's at-large congressional district 1813-1815	Succeeded by Daniel Chipman
Preceded by Phineas White	Member of the U.S. House of Representatives from Vermont's at-large congressional district 1823-1825	Succeeded by Rollin C. Mallary
Preceded by Rollin C. Mallary	Member of the U.S. House of Representatives from Vermont's at-large congressional district 1825-1827	Succeeded by Jonathan Hunt
