= 1836 Vermont gubernatorial election =

- September 6, 1836
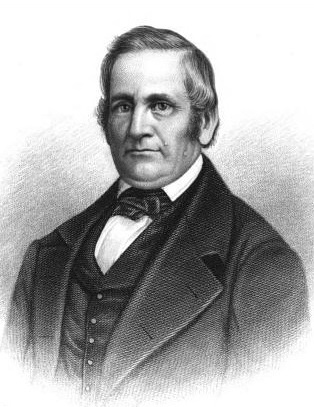

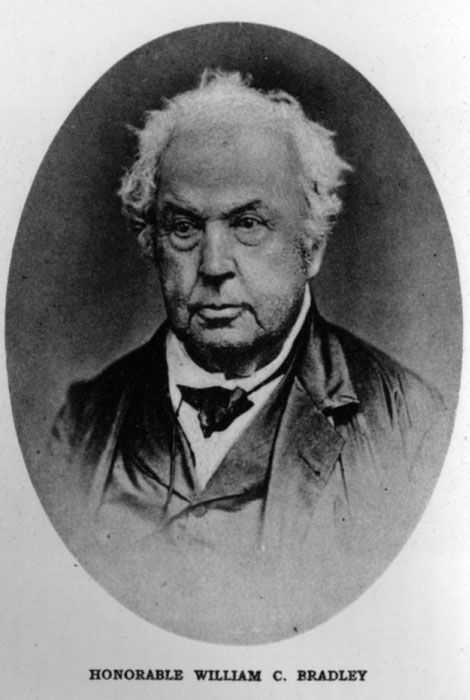
Nominee	Silas H. Jennison	William Czar Bradley
Party	Whig	Democratic
Alliance	Anti-Masonic
Popular vote	20,471	16,124
Percentage	55.89%	44.02%
- County results Jennison: 50–60% 60–70% Bradley: 50–60% No Vote/Data
Governor before election
Silas H. Jennison (acting)
Whig
Elected Governor
Silas H. Jennison
Whig

The 1836 Vermont gubernatorial election was held on September 6, 1836.

Incumbent Whig acting Governor Silas H. Jennison defeated Democratic nominee William Czar Bradley with 55.89% of the vote.

== General election ==
=== Candidates ===
- William Czar Bradley, Democratic, former U.S. Representative, Democratic candidate for Governor in 1834 and 1835
- Silas H. Jennison, Whig (with Anti-Masonic support), incumbent acting Governor

=== Results ===
1836 Vermont gubernatorial election (Note: Some sources give the result as Jennison 20,371, Bradley 16,134, scattering 35. The result given here is that given in the Vermont House Journal.)
Party	Candidate	Votes	%	±%
Whig	Silas H. Jennison (inc.)	20,471	55.89%	
Democratic	William Czar Bradley	16,124	44.02%	
Scattering		35	0.09%	
Majority		4,347	11.87%	
Turnout		36,630		
Whig hold		Swing		
