= John C. Thompson =

American judge (1790–1831)

John C. Thompson (1790–June 27, 1831) was a Vermont lawyer, politician, and judge who served as a justice of the Vermont Supreme Court from 1830 until his death.

== Biography ==
John C. Thompson was born in Westerly, Rhode Island, probably in 1790. He studied law with an attorney in Hartford, Connecticut, and attained admission to the bar. He moved to Windsor, Vermont in 1813, where he established himself as an attorney and also became active in politics as a Democratic-Republican, including serving as editor of the Vermont Republican newspaper. He practiced law in Windsor until 1818, when he moved to Hartland. Thompson moved to Burlington in 1822.

In 1827, Thompson was elected to the Vermont Executive Council, and he served until 1830. In 1830, Chief Justice Samuel Prentiss of the Vermont Supreme Court resigned because he had been elected to the United States Senate, and Associate Justice Titus Hutchinson was elevated to chief justice. Thompson was appointed to succeed Hutchinson as an Associate Justice, and he served until his death.

Thompson was traveling from Burlington to Montpelier in June 1831 when he was suddenly taken ill. He returned to Burlington, where he died on June 27. He was buried at Elmwood Cemetery in Burlington, and was succeeded on the court by Samuel S. Phelps.

== Family ==
In 1816, Thompson married Nancy Patrick (1796–1865) of Windsor. They were the parents of Sophia Patrick Thompson (1826–1833), and Charles Henry Thompson (1830–1846). Charles died when he drowned after a sailing accident on Lake Champlain.

In her later years, Nancy Patrick Thompson resided in Troy, New York with her sister Sophia and brother-in-law Gardner Stow. According to a November 1847 newspaper article, another daughter of John C. Thompson and Nancy Patrick, also named Nancy, married John D. Duggan in Troy in a ceremony performed by Reverend John H. Hopkins of Burlington. This article also indicated that at the time of the wedding, Duggan was a resident of Cuba, West Indies.

== Sources ==
=== Books ===
- Fleetwood, Frederick G. (1902). Vermont Legislative Directory. Montpelier, VT: Vermont Watchman Co.
- Thompson, Zadock (1842). History of Vermont, Natural, Civil and Statistical. Burlington, VT: Chauncey Goodrich. p. 124.
- Ullery, Jacob G. (1894). Men of Vermont Illustrated. Brattleboro, VT: Transcript Publishing Company. p. 181.

=== Magazines ===
- Taft, Russell S. (March 1, 1894). "The Supreme Court of Vermont, Part IV: John C. Thompson". The Green Bag. Boston, MA: Boston Book Company.

=== Internet ===
- Hance, Dawn D.; Nichols, Joann H. (October 15, 2015). "Extracts from the Rutland Weekly Herald, 1816-1820" (PDF). Rutland Historical Society. Rutland, VT.
- "Vermont Vital Records, 1720-1908, Death Entry for Sophia P. Thompson". Ancestry.com. Provo, UT: Ancestry.com, LLC.
- "Vermont Vital Records, 1720-1908, Death Entry for Charles H. Thompson". Ancestry.com. Provo, UT: Ancestry.com, LLC.
- "Vermont Vital Records, 1720-1908, Death Entry for John C. Thompson". Ancestry.com. Provo, UT: Ancestry.com, LLC.
- "Vermont Vital Records, 1720-1908, Death Entry for Nancy (Patrick) Thompson". Ancestry.com. Provo, UT: Ancestry.com, LLC.
- "Vermont Vital Records, 1720-1908, marriage Entry for Nancy P. Thompson and John D. Duggan". Ancestry.com. Provo, UT: Ancestry.com, LLC.

=== Newspapers ===
- "Married: J. D. Duggan, Nancy P. Thompson". Burlington Free Press. Burlington, VT. November 12, 1847.

Political offices
Preceded by Titus Hutchinson	Justice of the Vermont Supreme Court; 1830–1831	Succeeded by Samuel S. Phelps
