= 1843 Vermont gubernatorial election =

- September 5, 1843
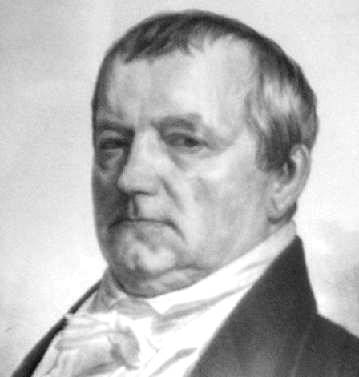

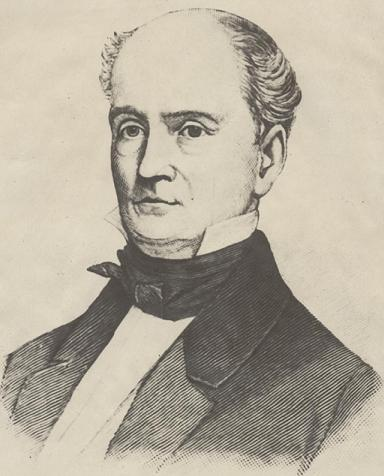

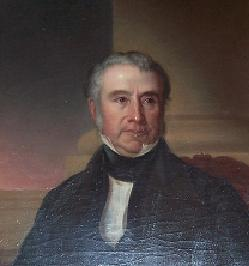
Nominee	John Mattocks	Daniel Kellogg	Charles K. Williams
Party	Whig	Democratic	Liberty
Electoral vote	131	104	7
Popular vote	24,465	21,982	3,766
Percentage	48.70%	43.76%	7.50%
- County results Mattocks: 40–50% 50–60% Kellogg: 50–60%
Governor before election
Charles Paine
Whig
Elected Governor
John Mattocks
Whig

The 1843 Vermont gubernatorial election was held on September 5, 1843.

Incumbent Whig Governor Charles Paine did not run for re-election.

Whig nominee John Mattocks defeated Democratic nominee Daniel Kellogg and Liberty nominee Charles K. Williams.

Since no candidate received a majority in the popular vote, Mattocks was elected by the Vermont General Assembly per the state constitution.

== General election ==
=== Candidates ===
- Daniel Kellogg, Democratic, former United States Attorney for the District of Vermont
- John Mattocks, Whig, former U.S. Representative
- Charles K. Williams, Liberty, incumbent Chief Judge of the Vermont Supreme Court, Liberty nominee for Governor in 1842

=== Results ===
1843 Vermont gubernatorial election
Party	Candidate	Votes	%	±%
Whig	John Mattocks	24,465	48.70%	
Democratic	Daniel Kellogg	21,982	43.76%	
Liberty	Charles K. Williams	3,766	7.50%	
Scattering		21	0.04%	
Majority		2,483	4.94%	
Turnout		50,234		

=== Legislative election ===
As no candidate received a majority of the vote, the Vermont General Assembly was required to decide the election, both Houses meeting jointly choosing among the top three vote-getters, Mattocks, Kellogg, and Williams. The legislative election was held on October 12, 1843.

Legislative election
Party	Candidate	Votes	%
Whig	John Mattocks	131	54.13%
Democratic	Daniel Kellogg	104	42.98%
Liberty	Charles K. Williams	7	2.89%
Turnout		242	
Whig hold			
