= David M. Camp =

American attorney and politician

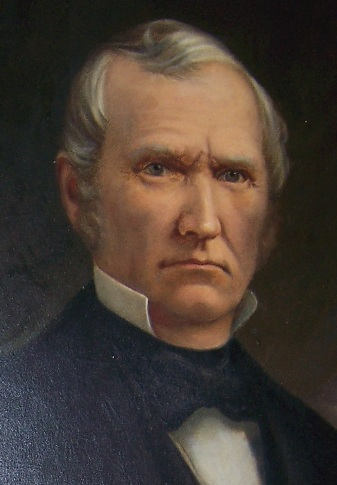
David M. Camp

David M. Camp (April 21, 1788 – February 20, 1871) was a Vermont attorney and politician who served as the 12th lieutenant governor of Vermont from 1836 to 1841 under Governor Silas H. Jennison.

== Biography ==
David Manning Camp was born in Tunbridge, Vermont on April 21, 1788. He graduated from the University of Vermont in 1810, and in 1813 moved to Derby to become a US Customs Collector.

Camp subsequently studied law with William Brayton, attained admission to the bar, and became an attorney in Newport. He served as Orleans County State's Attorney in 1815. He was a member of the Vermont House of Representatives from 1825 to 1826 and 1834 to 1835. Camp also served as Orleans County Assistant Judge from 1830 to 1832 and 1834 to 1835.

Camp became a Whig when that party was founded and served as Lieutenant Governor from 1836 to 1841. He was the first Lieutenant Governor elected after the creation of the Vermont Senate, and so the first Lieutenant Governor to serve as President of the Senate.

He was a Delegate to the 1839 Whig national convention. After serving as Lieutenant Governor Camp won election to the Vermont Senate, serving from 1842 to 1844.

Camp served as Orleans County Assistant Judge again in 1843, and also served as Orleans County Superintendent of Schools.

In the 1850s Camp relocated to Milwaukee, Wisconsin where his son Hoel H. Camp was a prominent banker and businessman. He returned to Vermont in the 1860s, settling in Derby Line, where he lived in retirement.

Camp died in Derby Line on February 20, 1871. He was buried in Derby Center Cemetery.

== Family ==
In 1815, Camp married Sarepta Savage (1793-1852) of Hartford, Vermont. Their children included Norman Williams (1817-1898); George Rex (1819-1822); Hoel Hinman (1822-1909); and Frances Harriet (1830-1894).

David M. Camp's nephew, also named David M. Camp, was Clerk of the Vermont House of Representatives from 1869 to 1878 and also served as a member of the Vermont House.

Party political offices
Preceded by Silas H. Jennison	Whig nominee for Lieutenant Governor of Vermont; 1836, 1837, 1838, 1838, 1839, 1840	Succeeded by Waitstill R. Ranney
Political offices
Preceded by Silas H. Jennison	Lieutenant Governor of Vermont; 1836–1841	Succeeded by Waitstill R. Ranney
