= 1840 Vermont gubernatorial election =

- September 1, 1840
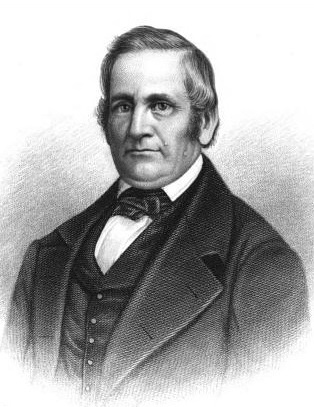

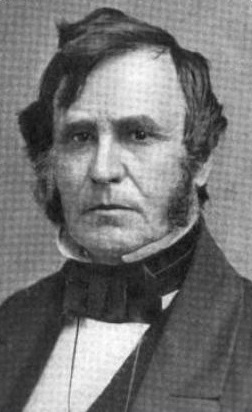
Nominee	Silas H. Jennison	Paul Dillingham
Party	Whig	Democratic
Popular vote	33,435	22,637
Percentage	59.58%	40.34%
- County results Jennison: 50–60% 60–70% 70–80% Dillingham: 50–60%
Governor before election
Silas H. Jennison
Whig
Elected Governor
Silas H. Jennison
Whig

The 1840 Vermont gubernatorial election was held on September 1, 1840. Incumbent Whig Governor Silas H. Jennison defeated Democratic nominee Paul Dillingham with 59.58% of the vote.

== General election ==
=== Candidates ===
- Paul Dillingham, Democratic, town clerk of Waterbury, former member of the Vermont House of Representatives
- Silas H. Jennison, Whig, incumbent Governor

=== Results ===
1840 Vermont gubernatorial election (Note: Some sources give the result as Jennison 33,653, Dillingham 23,000. The result given here is that given in the Vermont House Journal.)
Party	Candidate	Votes	%	±%
Whig	Silas H. Jennison (inc.)	33,435	59.58%	
Democratic	Paul Dillingham	22,637	40.34%	
Scattering		45	0.08%	
Majority		10,798	19.24%	
Turnout		56,117		
Whig hold		Swing		
