= Jonathan Dorr Bradley =

American politician

Jonathan Dorr Bradley (April 1803 – September 8, 1862) was an American lawyer and politician.

He was the son of the Hon. William Czar Bradley, and was born in Westminster, Vermont, April, 1803. He graduated from Yale College in 1822. He entered upon the profession of the Law. He first settled at Bellows Falls, Vermont, and afterwards at Brattleboro, Vermont. To his legal attainments, he added unusual acquisitions in literature and science.

Bradley – a member of the Democratic Party's Barnburner faction – was the party's nominee for Vermont's 1st congressional district in the 1846 and 1848 elections. He was defeated by Whig Party nominee William Henry in both elections.

In 1856 and 1857 he represented the town of Brattleboro in the Vermont Legislature. He was also a member of the Board of Education in Vermont, from its organization until his death.

He died in Brattleboro, Vermont, September 8, 1862, aged 59 years, 5 months. He left a widow and four sons.
