= Waitstill R. Ranney =

American politician

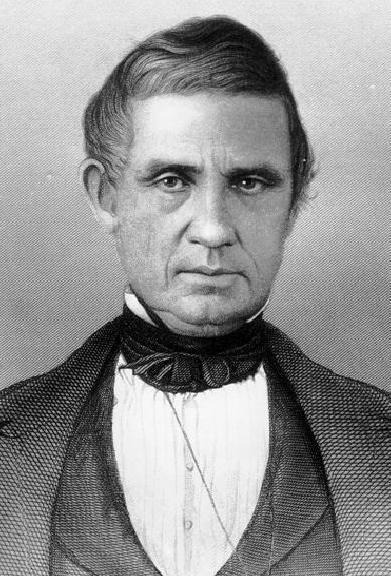
- Townshend Historical Society illustration of Ranney, circa 1841

13th Lieutenant governor of Vermont
- In office 1841–1843
- Governor: Charles Paine
- Preceded by: David M. Camp
- Succeeded by: Horace Eaton

Member of the Vermont Senate from Windham County
- In office 1836–1838 Serving with Phineas White (1836, 1837), William Henry (1836), John Phelps (1837)
- Preceded by: None (position created)
- Succeeded by: David Chandler, Calvin Townesley, Laban Jones

Member of the Vermont House of Representatives from Townshend
- In office 1833–1834
- Preceded by: John P. Marsh
- Succeeded by: Chapin Howard

Personal details
- Born: May 23, 1791 Chester, Vermont, U.S.
- Died: August 23, 1853 (aged 62) Townshend, Vermont, U.S.
- Resting place: Oakwood Cemetery, Townshend, Vermont, U.S.
- Party: Whig
- Spouse(s): Phebe Atwood (m. 1811); Mary A. Cook (m. 1846)
- Children: 13 (including Ambrose Ranney)
- Education: Dartmouth College (attended); Middlebury College (attended)
- Profession: Physician

Waitstill R. Ranney (May 23, 1791 – August 23, 1853) was a Vermont medical doctor and politician who served as 13th lieutenant governor of Vermont from 1841 to 1843.

== Biography ==
Waitstill Randolph Ranney was born in Chester, Vermont on May 23, 1791, a son of Waitstill Ranney (1762–1839) and Abigail (Harlow) Ranney. He prepared for college at the Charlestown, New Hampshire school run by the Reverend Dan Foster. Ranney attended Dartmouth and Middlebury Colleges and became a physician while also maintaining a farm in Townshend. In 1827 Ranney received an honorary degree from Castleton Medical College.

Ranney served in several local offices, including school board member. He was a Delegate to the 1828 Vermont constitutional convention and a member of the Vermont House of Representatives from 1833 to 1834.

He became active in the Whig Party at its founding, served in the Vermont Senate from 1836 to 1838. He transferred his farm to one of his sons in the late 1830s and moved to a home in the center of town.

Ranney presided over the famous July, 1840 Whig political meeting on Stratton Mountain at which Daniel Webster delivered a well-known speech that began "Fellow citizens, I have come to meet you among the clouds...".

He served as Lieutenant Governor from 1841 to 1843.

Ranney remained active until his health began to fail in the late 1840s, after which he lived in retirement in Townshend. He died in Townshend on August 23, 1853, and was buried in Townshend's Oakwood Cemetery.

== Family ==
In 1811, Ranney married Phebe Atwood of Chester. She died in 1844, and in 1846, Ranney married Mrs. Mary A. Cook. With his first wife, Ranney was the father of 13 children, nine sons and four daughters. The sons included Ambrose Ranney, a member of the U.S. House of Representatives from Massachusetts.

Party political offices
Preceded by David M. Camp	Whig nominee for Lieutenant Governor of Vermont; 1841, 1842	Succeeded by Horace Eaton
Political offices
Preceded by David M. Camp	Lieutenant Governor of Vermont; 1841–1843	Succeeded by Horace Eaton
