= William Slade (politician) =

American politician (1786–1859)

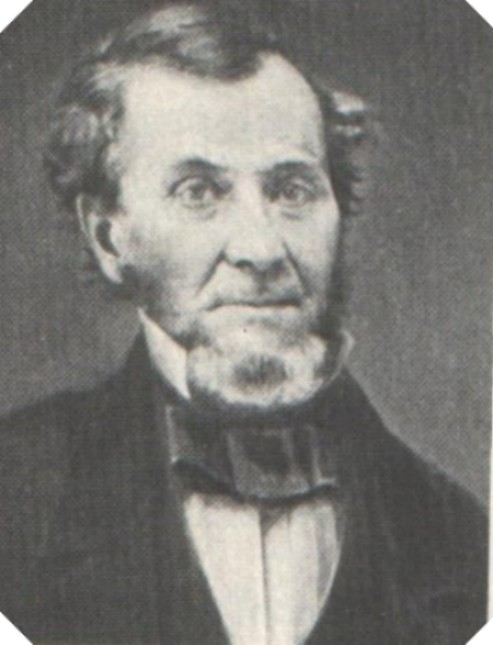

17th Governor of Vermont
- In office October 11, 1844 – October 9, 1846
- Lieutenant: Horace Eaton
- Preceded by: John Mattocks
- Succeeded by: Horace Eaton

Member of the U.S. House of Representatives from Vermont's 2nd district
- In office November 1, 1831 – March 3, 1843
- Preceded by: Rollin Carolas Mallary
- Succeeded by: Jacob Collamer

Secretary of State of Vermont
- In office 1815–1823
- Governor: Jonas Galusha; Richard Skinner
- Preceded by: Josiah Dunham
- Succeeded by: Norman Williams

Personal details
- Born: William Slade Jr. May 9, 1786 Cornwall, Vermont Republic
- Died: January 16, 1859 (aged 72) Middlebury, Vermont, U.S.
- Resting place: West Cemetery, Middlebury, Vermont, U.S.
- Party: Whig
- Other political affiliations: Democratic-Republican; Anti-Masonic
- Spouse: Abigail Foot Slade
- Children: 8, including James M. Slade
- Education: Middlebury College
- Profession: lawyer editor politician

William Slade Jr. (May 9, 1786 – January 16, 1859) was an American Whig and Anti-Masonic politician. He served as a U.S. representative from Vermont from 1831 to 1843, where he was an outspoken opponent of slavery. He was the 17th governor of Vermont.

== Biography ==
Slade was born in Cornwall in the Vermont Republic on May 9, 1786, the son of William Slade and Rebecca Plumb. He attended the public schools and graduated from Middlebury College in 1807 with classmates Daniel Azro Ashley Buck and Stephen Royce. He studied law with Joel Doolittle and was admitted to the bar in 1810. He began the practice of law in Middlebury, Vermont. Slade married Abigail Foot on February 5, 1810, in Middlebury. They had nine children between 1810 and 1829; four died very young. One son, James M. Slade, served as Lieutenant Governor from 1856 to 1857. William Slade was a Democratic-Republican presidential elector in 1812 and 1820.

Slade engaged in editorial work; he established and was editor of the Columbian Patriot from 1814 to 1816 and maintained a book store and printing office. He was Vermont Secretary of State from 1815 to 1822, Judge of the Addison County Court from 1816 to 1822, and Clerk in the U.S. State Department in Washington, D.C., from 1823 to 1829.

In 1831, Slade was elected to the U.S. House of Representatives as an Anti-Masonic candidate in a special election to fill the vacancy created by the death of Rollin C. Mallary. He was reelected as an Anti-Masonic candidate to the Twenty-third and Twenty-fourth Congresses and as a Whig candidate to the Twenty-fifth, Twenty-sixth and Twenty-seventh Congresses, serving from November 1, 1831, to March 3, 1843.

On December 20, 1837, Slade played a central role early in the House of Representatives's debate over slavery and the slave trade in the District of Columbia. A year earlier the House had adopted a rule prohibiting discussion of those subjects as too contentious. Slade asked that a committee be appointed to consider anti-slavery petitions and contended the gag rule did not apply since he was discussing the creation of a committee rather than slavery itself. He nevertheless discussed the history of slavery and its inhumanity at length as groups of congressmen from Southern states tried to shout him down and then left in protest. As a result, the House adopted a more extensive gag rule the next day.

Slade was the reporter of decisions of the Vermont Supreme Court in 1843 and 1844. He was elected to a one-year term as Governor of Vermont in 1844, defeating Democratic nominee Daniel Kellogg. The next year no candidate won a majority of votes cast and the legislature elected him to a second term. During his tenure, public schools were successfully reorganized.

After leaving office, Slade was corresponding secretary of the Board of National Popular Education from 1846 to 1859, which he co-founded with Catharine Beecher. The Board worked to place female teachers in schools in western United States.

Slade died in Middlebury, Vermont, on January 16, 1859, and is interred at West Cemetery in Middlebury. Also memorialized on the family burial monument is Eliza Dodson, an African-American girl whom Slade brought to Vermont from Washington. Slade had her buried in his family plot when she died on April 19, 1853, at the age of 18.

== Published works ==
- "Vermont State Papers" (Middlebury, 1823),
- "The Laws of Vermont to 1824" (Windsor, 1825)
- "Reports of the Supreme Court of Vermont, Vol. XV," (Burlington, 1844).

Party political offices
Preceded by John Mattocks	Whig nominee for Governor of Vermont; 1844, 1845	Succeeded by Horace Eaton
U.S. House of Representatives
Preceded by Rollin C. Mallary	Member of the U.S. House of Representatives from Vermont's 2nd congressional district 1831–1843	Succeeded by Jacob Collamer
Political offices
Preceded by Josiah Dunham	Secretary of State of Vermont; 1815–1823	Succeeded by Norman Williams
Preceded by John Mattocks	Governor of Vermont; 1844–1846	Succeeded by Horace Eaton
