= Titus Hutchinson =

American judge

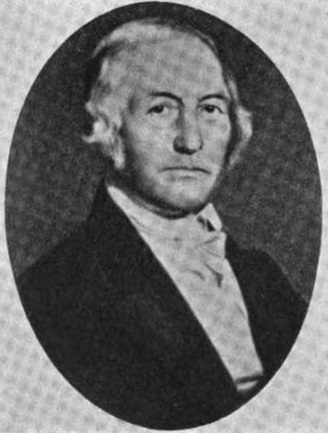
Titus Hutchinson, Vermont Supreme Court Justice.

Titus Hutchinson (April 29, 1771, in Grafton, Massachusetts – August 24, 1857, in Woodstock, Vermont) was an American lawyer, politician, and judge in the state of Vermont. He served on the Vermont Supreme Court from 1825 to 1833 and as Chief Judge from 1831 to 1833.

== Early life ==
Hutchinson was the youngest of ten children of the Reverend Aaron Hutchinson of Grafton, Massachusetts. The family moved to Pomfret, Vermont in 1776, where a number of them became prominent citizens. His oldest brother Aaron (1754-1843) graduated from Harvard in 1770 and was a successful lawyer; Alexander (1764-1853) served in the Revolution and became Vermont State Auditor; another brother, Oliver (1768-1800), was a successful merchant.

Although his education had been quite irregular and informal, at 19 Hutchinson decided to quit farming and go to college. He began to study with his father and learned his Latin grammar in 4 weeks, and by the summer of 1792 he was ready to enter college as a junior, which he did at Princeton, graduating in 1794. After studying law with his brother Aaron, he was admitted to the bar in 1798.

== Career ==
After opening a law office in his home in Woodstock, Vermont in 1799, Hutchinson had a successful practice. In 1801, he was appointed postmaster and held that office for three years; in 1803 he was appointed State's Attorney for Windsor County, and he served until 1813. Between 1804 and 1825 he represented Woodstock in the legislature nine times. In 1810, he became one of the Trustees of the University of Vermont. Hutchinson served as United States Attorney for Vermont from 1813 to 1821. In 1824, he was a candidate for U.S. Senate, coming in third. In 1825, he was selected by the legislature to serve as an associate justice of the Vermont Supreme Court. In 1831, he succeeded Samuel Prentiss as Chief Justice, and John C. Thompson was named to the Associated Justice position vacated by Hutchinson. He served as chief justice until 1833.

Hutchinson was probably removed from his position on the Vermont Supreme Court due to his involvement with the Anti-Masonic Party. He was almost elected United States representative in 1833, winning the highest vote total in the general election and the first runoff, but losing in the second runoff to Horace Everett.

Hutchinson became involved with the abolitionist Liberty Party and was their candidate for governor of Vermont in 1841; he received 6% of the vote and deprived the other candidates of a majority, sending the election to the state legislature. He ran on the Liberty ticket for the United States representative three times (in 1843, 1844, and 1846), receiving as much as 15% of the vote and twice forcing a runoff election by depriving Whig Jacob Collamer of a majority.

Hutchinson served as a presidential elector twice, for John Quincy Adams in 1824 and William Henry Harrison in 1836.

Hutchinson held strong anti-slavery views and was a part of the Underground Railroad helping slaves escape to Canada; a tunnel existed from his house in Woodstock to nearby Kedron Brook.

== Family ==
Hutchinson married Clarissa Sage (1784-1844) in 1800; they had six children: Edwin (1803-1861), Oramel (1804-1878), and Henry (1806-1885), all lawyers; Titus (1809-1889), a merchant; Clarissa (1816-1852); and Alexander (1816-1850), who died on his way west to California.

Party political offices
First	Liberty nominee for Governor of Vermont; 1841	Succeeded by Charles K. Williams
