= Isaac Fletcher (American politician) =

American politician (1784–1842)

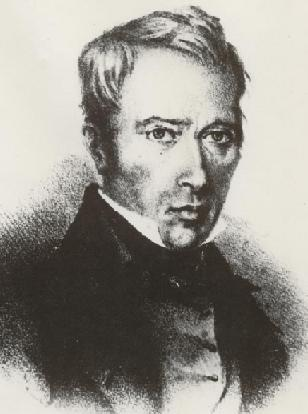

Member of the United States House of Representatives from Vermont's 5th district
- In office March 4, 1837 – March 3, 1841
- Preceded by: Henry Fisk Janes
- Succeeded by: John Mattocks

Adjutant General of the Vermont Militia
- In office 1824–1833
- Preceded by: Daniel Kellogg
- Succeeded by: Martin Flint

Speaker of the Vermont House of Representatives
- In office 1824–1825
- Preceded by: George E. Wales
- Succeeded by: D. Azro A. Buck

State's Attorney of Caledonia County, Vermont
- In office 1820–1828
- Preceded by: William A. Griswold
- Succeeded by: Charles Davis

Member of the Vermont House of Representatives from Lyndon
- In office 1819-1821
- Preceded by: Isiah Fisk
- Succeeded by: Isiah Fisk
- In office 1822-1823
- Preceded by: Isiah Fisk
- Succeeded by: Isiah Fisk
- In office 1824-1825
- Preceded by: Isiah Fisk
- Succeeded by: William Cahoon

Personal details
- Born: November 22, 1784 Dunstable, Massachusetts, U.S.
- Died: October 19, 1842 (aged 57) Lyndon, Vermont, U.S.
- Party: Democratic-Republican; Democratic
- Spouse: Abigail Stone Fletcher
- Children: Charles B. Fletcher
- Education: Dartmouth College; University of Vermont
- Profession: Politician, Lawyer

Isaac Fletcher (November 22, 1784 – October 19, 1842) was an American lawyer and politician. He served as a U.S. representative from Vermont and as Adjutant General of the Vermont Militia.

== Biography ==
Fletcher was born in Dunstable, Massachusetts to Joseph Fletcher and Molly Cummings Fletcher. He pursued classical studies, and graduated with honors from Dartmouth College in Hanover, New Hampshire, in 1808. He taught at the academy at Chesterfield, New Hampshire, while in college, and after graduating he studied law with the firm of Prescott & Dunbar in Keene, New Hampshire. He was admitted to the bar in Keene and in Newfane, Vermont, in December 1811, and moved to Lyndon, Vermont, to start a practice. Among the prospective attorneys who studied under Fletcher were Thomas J. D. Fuller and Thomas Bartlett Jr.

He was a member of the Vermont House of Representatives for several terms between 1819 and 1825, and served as Speaker from 1824 to 1825. Fletcher was Caledonia County State's Attorney from 1820 until 1828, and a member of the state constitutional convention in 1822. Fletcher received a master's degree from the University of Vermont in 1823.

He was military aide to Governor Richard Skinner, and served as Adjutant General of the State Militia from 1824 until 1833.

He was elected as a Democrat to the Twenty-fifth and Twenty-sixth Congresses, serving from March 4, 1837, until March 3, 1841. While in Congress, he was the Chairman of the Committee on Patents. He was an unsuccessful candidate for reelection in 1840 to the Twenty-seventh Congress.

== Personal life ==
Fletcher married Abigail Stone on February 4, 1812. They had one son, Charles B. Fletcher.

== Death ==
Fletcher's health declined rapidly during his final term in Congress, which was attributed by doctors to overwork. He died in Lyndon on October 19, 1842, and is interred at the Lyndon Town Cemetery in Lyndon.

Military offices
Preceded by Daniel Kellogg	Vermont Adjutant General; 1824–1833	Succeeded by Martin Flint
U.S. House of Representatives
Preceded by Henry F. Janes	Member of the U.S. House of Representatives from Vermont's 5th congressional district 1837–1841	Succeeded by John Mattocks
