= John Mattocks =

American judge

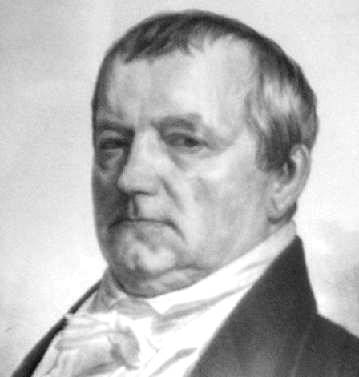

16th Governor of Vermont
- In office October 13, 1843 – October 11, 1844
- Lieutenant: Horace Eaton
- Preceded by: Charles Paine
- Succeeded by: William Slade

Member of the U.S. House of Representatives from Vermont
- In office March 4, 1821 – March 4, 1823
- Preceded by: District established
- Succeeded by: District eliminated
- Constituency: 6th district
- In office March 4, 1825 – March 4, 1827
- Preceded by: Samuel C. Crafts
- Succeeded by: Daniel Buck
- Constituency: 5th district
- In office March 4, 1841 – March 4, 1843
- Preceded by: Isaac Fletcher
- Succeeded by: District eliminated
- Constituency: 5th district

Member of the Vermont House of Representatives
- In office 1807; 1815–1816; 1823–1824

Personal details
- Born: March 4, 1777 Hartford, Connecticut
- Died: August 14, 1847 (aged 70) Peacham, Vermont
- Party: Whig
- Spouse: Esther Newell
- Profession: Lawyer; Judge; Politician

John Mattocks (March 4, 1777 – August 14, 1847) was an American Whig politician, a brigadier general in the War of 1812, a U.S. representative, and 16th governor of Vermont.

== Biography ==
Mattocks was born in Hartford, Connecticut on March 4, 1777, and moved with his parents to Tinmouth, Vermont in 1778. His father, Samuel Mattocks, was a veteran of the American Revolution and served as Vermont State Treasurer from 1784 to 1800. John Mattocks pursued an academic course, studied law in Middlebury, Vermont and Fairfield, Connecticut, and was admitted to the bar in 1797. He married Esther Newell and they had five children; three sons, George, John, and William; and two daughters named Esther who died in their first years.

== Career ==
Mattocks commenced practice in Danville; moved to Peacham, Vermont. He was a member of the Vermont House of Representatives in 1807, 1815, 1816, 1823, and 1824. During the War of 1812, he served as a brigadier general of militia.

Mattocks was elected to the Seventeenth Congress (March 4, 1821 – March 3, 1823). He was elected to the Nineteenth Congress (March 4, 1825 – March 3, 1827); and served as chairman of the U.S. House Committee on Expenditures in the Department of War (Nineteenth Congress). He was a judge of the Vermont Supreme Court in 1833 and 1834, and declined to be a candidate for renomination. Mattocks was a delegate to the State constitutional convention in 1836 He was elected as a Whig to the Twenty-seventh Congress (March 4, 1841 – March 3, 1843).

In 1843, the major candidates for Governor of Vermont were Mattocks (Whig), Daniel Kellogg (Democrat), and Charles K. Williams (Liberty). In the general election, they received 24,465 votes (48.7%), 21,982 (43.8%), and 3,766 (7.5%). Because no candidate had the majority required by the Vermont Constitution, the Vermont General Assembly made the selection, and chose Mattocks. During his term, his son, George, committed suicide and, grief-stricken, Mattocks declined to run for another term.

== Death and legacy ==
Mattocks died in Peacham, Vermont, August 14, 1847; is interred at Peacham Village Cemetery, Caledonia County, Vermont. His house, built in 1805 and purchased in 1807, stands in the center of town and is a local landmark. His son John was a minister, and his son, William became a lawyer and served as Caledonia County's state's attorney.

== Sources ==
=== Books ===
- Wiley, Edgar J. (1917). Catalogue of Officers and Students of Middlebury College. Middlebury, VT: Middlebury College.
- Redfield, Isaac (1886). Baldwin, Frederick W. (ed.). Biography of the Bar of Orleans County, Vermont: John Mattocks. Montpelier, VT: Vermont Watchman and State Journal Press.
- Spencer, Thomas E. (1998). Where They're Buried. Baltimore, MD: Clearfield Company. p. 309. ISBN 978-0-8063-4823-0.

=== Internet ===
- "John Mattocks". Biographical Directory of the United States Congress.
- "John Mattocks". National Governors Association.
- National Park Service (2003). "National Register of Historic Places Registration Form: Peacham Corner Historic District" (PDF). NPS.gov/. Washington, DC: US Department of the Interior.

=== Magazines ===
- Benjamin, Park, ed. (October 21, 1843). "The Political World: Vermont". The New World. New York, NY: J. Winchester.

Party political offices
Preceded by Charles Paine	Whig nominee for Governor of Vermont; 1843	Succeeded by William Slade
U.S. House of Representatives
Preceded by None	Member of the U.S. House of Representatives from Vermont's 6th congressional district 1821–1823	Succeeded by None
Preceded by Samuel C. Crafts	Member of the U.S. House of Representatives from Vermont's 5th congressional district 1825–1827	Succeeded by Daniel Azro Ashley Buck
Preceded by Isaac Fletcher	Member of the U.S. House of Representatives from Vermont's 5th congressional district 1841–1843	Succeeded by District eliminated
Political offices
Preceded by Charles Paine	Governor of Vermont; 1843–1844	Succeeded by William Slade
