= William A. Griswold =

American politician (1775–1846)

Member of the Vermont House of Representatives
- In office 1841–1842
- Preceded by: Carlos Baxter
- Succeeded by: John Van Sicklen
- Constituency: Burlington

Member of the Vermont Governor's Council
- In office 1833–1835
- Preceded by: Nathan Leavenworth
- Succeeded by: George Perkins Marsh

United States Attorney for the District of Vermont
- In office 1821–1829
- Preceded by: Titus Hutchinson
- Succeeded by: Daniel Kellogg

24th Speaker of the Vermont House of Representatives
- In office 1819–1820
- Preceded by: Richard Skinner
- Succeeded by: Daniel Azro Ashley Buck

22nd Speaker of the Vermont House of Representatives
- In office 1815–1818
- Preceded by: Daniel Chipman
- Succeeded by: Richard Skinner

Member of the Vermont House of Representatives
- In office 1827–1828
- Preceded by: William A. Palmer
- Succeeded by: Augustine Clarke
- Constituency: Danville
- In office 1819–1820
- Preceded by: William A. Palmer
- Succeeded by: Joseph Morrill
- Constituency: Danville
- In office 1813–1818
- Preceded by: William A. Palmer
- Succeeded by: William A. Palmer
- Constituency: Danville
- In office 1807–1811
- Preceded by: Joseph Moffet
- Succeeded by: William A. Palmer
- Constituency: Danville

State's Attorney of Caledonia County, Vermont
- In office 1816–1819
- Preceded by: William Mattocks
- Succeeded by: Isaac Fletcher
- In office 1804–1813
- Preceded by: William Mattocks
- Succeeded by: William Mattocks

Personal details
- Born: September 15, 1775 New Marlborough, Massachusetts, British America
- Died: January 17, 1846 (aged 70) Burlington, Vermont, U.S.
- Resting place: Elmwood Cemetery, Burlington, Vermont U.S.
- Party: Democratic-Republican; Whig
- Spouse(s): Mary Follett (m. 1798); Permelia Adams (m. 1833)
- Children: 5
- Education: Dartmouth College
- Profession: Attorney

William A. Griswold (September 15, 1775 – January 17, 1846) was an American lawyer and politician in the U.S. state of Vermont. He served as the 22nd and 24th Speaker of the Vermont House of Representatives.

== Early life ==
William Adams Griswold was born in New Marlborough, Massachusetts on September 15, 1775. His family moved to Bennington, Vermont when he was ten years old and he attended the common schools there. He graduated from Dartmouth College in 1794, studied law with Jonathan Robinson of Bennington, and started a law practice in Danville. Among the prospective attorneys who studied law in his Danville office was Ephraim Paddock.

== Political career ==
In 1803 Griswold was named State's Attorney for Caledonia County, a position in which he served almost continuously until moving to Burlington in 1821. From 1804 to 1817, he served as Caledonia County's Register of Probate. A Democratic-Republican, Griswold represented Danville in the Vermont House of Representatives from 1807–1811.

In 1812 Griswold was one of Vermont's presidential electors, casting his ballot for James Madison. In 1813 Griswold returned to the Vermont House, serving until 1818. He served again in the State House from 1819–1820. Griswold was Speaker of the House from 1815-1818 and 1819–1820.

He was named United States Attorney for Vermont in 1821, a position in which he served until 1829. In 1828 he was elected to the Vermont Council of Censors. From 1828 until his death he served as President of the Lake Champlain Transportation Company, which operated steamships on Lake Champlain.

Griswold served on the Vermont Governor's Council from 1833–1834. In 1836 Griswold, by now a Whig, was a presidential elector from Vermont and cast his ballot for William Henry Harrison. Griswold represented Burlington in the Vermont House from 1841–1842.

He died in Burlington on January 17, 1846. He was buried at Elmwood Cemetery in Burlington.

Political offices
Preceded by Daniel Chipman	Speaker of the Vermont House of Representatives; 1815–1818	Succeeded by Richard Skinner
Preceded by Richard Skinner	Speaker of the Vermont House of Representatives; 1819–1820	Succeeded by D. Azro A. Buck
