= 1835 Vermont gubernatorial election =

- September 1, 1835
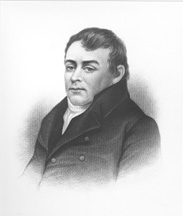

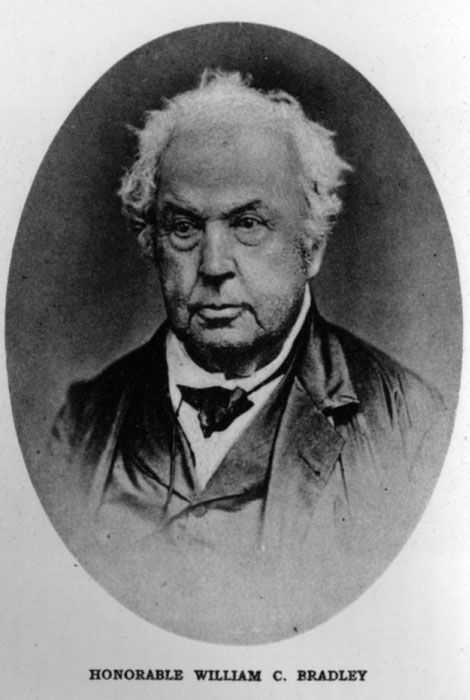

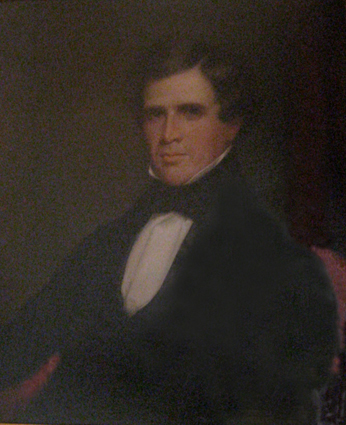
Nominee	William A. Palmer	William Czar Bradley	Charles Paine
Party	Anti-Masonic	Democratic	Whig
Electoral vote	110	73	42
Popular vote	16,210	13,254	5,435
Percentage	46.38%	37.92%	15.55%
- County results Palmer: 40–50% 50–60% 60–70% Bradley: 40–50% 50–60% No Vote/Data
Governor before election
William A. Palmer
Anti-Masonic
Elected Governor
Silas H. Jennison (acting)
Whig

The 1835 Vermont gubernatorial election was held on September 1, 1835.

Incumbent Anti-Masonic governor William A. Palmer contested the election with Democratic nominee William Czar Bradley and Whig nominee Charles Paine.

Since no candidate received a majority in the popular vote, the state constitution required the Vermont General Assembly and Vermont Executive Council to meet in joint convention and elect a governor. After 63 inconclusive ballots, the General Assembly adjourned on November 2 without making a choice. As a result, Silas H. Jennison, who had been elected Lieutenant Governor with Whig and Anti-Masonic support, served the term as acting governor.

== General election ==
=== Candidates ===
- William Czar Bradley, Democratic, former U.S. Representative, Democratic candidate for Governor in 1834
- Charles Paine, Whig, former member of the Vermont House of Representatives
- William A. Palmer, Anti-Masonic, incumbent governor

=== Results ===
1835 Vermont gubernatorial election
Party	Candidate	Votes	%	±%
Anti-Masonic	William A. Palmer (inc.)	16,210	46.38%	
Democratic	William Czar Bradley	13,254	37.92%	
Whig	Charles Paine	5,435	15.55%	
Scattering		54	0.15%	
Majority		2,956	8.46%	
Turnout		34,953		

=== Legislative election ===
As no candidate received a majority of the vote, the unicameral Vermont General Assembly, with the Executive Council, were required to decide the election, meeting as a joint body to elect a governor by majority vote.

The joint convention met in 15 different sessions on October 9 (5 ballots), 10 (2 ballots), 13 (11 ballots), 14 (4 ballots), 15, 17, 20, 21, 23, 28, 30 and November 2 (2 ballots) to elect a governor.

Incomplete results of the balloting were as follows:

The highest total for Palmer was 112, at a point when 117 was needed for election.

	Gubernatorial Ballot							
	1st	5th	7th	28th	34th	37th	61st	63rd
William A. Palmer	110	108	104	108	97	102	100	102
William Czar Bradley	73	72	70	70	71	70	79	63
Charles Paine	42	3	47	46	42	40	39	40
Silas H. Jennison			5		15	10		8
Scattering		3		3			6	

On November 2, after 63 ballots, the Convention voted by 113 – 100 to dissolve without electing a governor. Silas H. Jennison, elected Lieutenant Governor by a majority vote, served the term as governor.

Legislative election, 63rd ballot
Party	Candidate	Votes	%
Anti-Masonic	William A. Palmer	102	47.89%
Democratic	William Czar Bradley	63	29.58%
Whig	Charles Paine	40	18.78%
Whig	Silas H. Jennison	8	3.75%
Turnout		213	

== Bibliography ==
- Journal of the General Assembly of the State of Vermont, at their Session begun and holden at Montpelier, on Thursday, October 8, 1835. Middlebury: Knapp and Jewett, Printers. 1835.
- Kallenbach, Joseph E.; Kallenbach, Jessamine S., eds. (1977). American State Governors, 1776-1976. Vol. I. Dobbs Ferry, N.Y.: Oceana Publications, Inc. ISBN 0-379-00665-0.
