= Charles Paine =

American politician

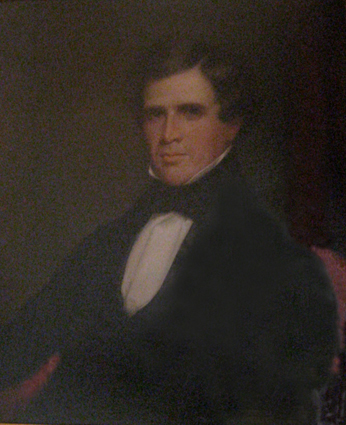
- Official Vermont State House portrait

15th Governor of Vermont
- In office October 15, 1841 – October 13, 1843
- Lieutenant: Waitstill R. Ranney
- Preceded by: Silas H. Jennison
- Succeeded by: John Mattocks

Member of the Vermont House of Representatives
- In office 1828–1830
- Preceded by: John Starkweather
- Succeeded by: Lebbeus Bennett

Personal details
- Born: April 15, 1799 Williamstown, Vermont
- Died: July 6, 1853 (aged 54) Waco, Texas
- Resting place: Elmwood Cemetery, Northfield, Vermont
- Party: Whig
- Domestic partner: Lorinda Stevens
- Children: 2
- Education: Harvard College
- Profession: Businessman

Charles Paine (April 15, 1799 – July 6, 1853) was an American Whig politician, woolen mill owner, merchant, railroad builder, and the 15th governor of Vermont.

== Biography ==
Paine was the son of Elijah Paine and Sarah (Porter) Paine, and was born in Williamstown, Vermont. He graduated from Harvard University in 1820, and became active in several business ventures. Though he never married, he had two children with Lorinda Stevens of Northfield.

== Career ==
Paine moved to Northfield, Vermont in the early part of the nineteenth century to run the family woolen mill. He operated this business until it was destroyed by fire in 1848. Paine's Meeting House was built in 1835 for the mill's workers as a place for worship. It still functions as one today. He had various other business interests including a hotel and a store, but he is most often remembered as the individual who brought railroads to Vermont. He founded the Vermont Central Railroad and served as the first president of the company.

In Northfield, Paine held the offices of Town Selectman and Moderator of the Town Meeting. In his political life he was a member of the Vermont House of Representatives from 1828 through 1829. He was the 15th governor of Vermont from 1841 until 1843. During his tenure, a stricter accounting of public funds was established.

As the founder and president of the Vermont Central Railroad Paine built its headquarters in his home town of Northfield, despite the hilly terrain, earning the enmity of residents of larger, more accessible nearby towns. In the extensive yard, engines and railroad cars were built and repaired. In 1853 the Vermont Central Railroad went into bankruptcy due to overexpansion and, in some cases, mismanagement. The railroad was placed under receivership and renamed the Central Vermont Railroad. Its headquarters were moved to St. Albans.

== Death ==
Paine died in Waco, Texas after three weeks of dysentery while helping the Southern Pacific Railroad choose a route. He is interred at Elmwood Cemetery, Northfield, Washington County, Vermont. Paine's home at 75 South Main Street, in Northfield is the location of the Northfield Historical Society, and is connected by an extension to the town's Brown Public Library.

Party political offices
Preceded by Silas H. Jennison	Whig nominee for Governor of Vermont; 1841, 1842	Succeeded by John Mattocks
Political offices
Preceded by Silas H. Jennison	Governor of Vermont; 1841-1843	Succeeded by John Mattocks
