= 1839 Vermont gubernatorial election =

- September 3, 1839
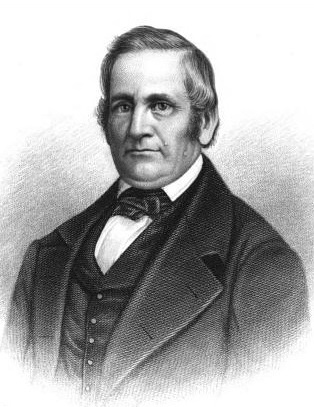

Nominee	Silas H. Jennison	Nathan Smilie
Party	Whig	Democratic
Popular vote	24,611	22,251
Percentage	52.48%	47.45%
- County results Jennison: 50–60% 60–70% Smilie: 50–60% 60–70%
Governor before election
Silas H. Jennison
Whig
Elected Governor
Silas H. Jennison
Whig

The 1839 Vermont gubernatorial election was held on September 3, 1839. Incumbent Whig Governor Silas H. Jennison defeated Democratic nominee Nathan Smilie with 52.48% of the vote.

== General election ==
=== Candidates ===
- Silas H. Jennison, Whig, incumbent Governor
- Nathan Smilie, Democratic, businessman, former member of the Vermont House of Representatives

=== Results ===
1839 Vermont gubernatorial election
Party	Candidate	Votes	%	±%
Whig	Silas H. Jennison (inc.)	24,611	52.48%	
Democratic	Nathan Smilie	22,251	47.45%	
Scattering		34	0.07%	
Majority		2,360	5.03%	
Turnout		46,896		
Whig hold		Swing		

=== Results by county ===
County	Silas Hemenway Jennison Whig		Nathan Smilie Democratic		Margin		Total votes cast
County	#	%	#	%	#	%	Total votes cast
Addison	2,015	65.61%	1,056	34.39%	959	31.23%	3,071
Bennington	1,406	45.59%	1,678	54.41%	272	-8.82%	3,084
Caledonia	1,494	42.35%	2,034	57.65%	540	-15.31%	3,528
Chittenden	1,729	50.75%	1,678	49.25%	51	1.50%	3,407
Essex	341	47.43%	378	52.57%	37	-5.15%	719
Franklin	1,669	53.68%	1,440	46.32%	229	7.37%	3,109
Grand Isle	302	61.76%	187	38.24%	115	23.52%	489
Lamoille	721	38.78%	1,138	61.22%	417	-22.43%	1,859
Orange	2,388	46.17%	2,784	53.83%	396	-7.66%	5,172
Orleans	1,159	52.75%	1,038	47.25%	121	5.51%	2,197
Rutland	3,016	61.38%	1,898	38.62%	1,118	22.75%	4,914
Washington	1,739	41.91%	2,410	58.09%	671	-16.17%	4,149
Windham	2,644	55.97%	2,080	44.03%	564	11.94%	4,724
Windsor	3,988	61.93%	2,452	38.07%	1,536	23.85%	6,440
Totals	24,611	52.52%	22,251	47.48%	2,360	5.04%	46,862
