= Silas H. Jennison =

American politician

Silas Hemenway Jennison
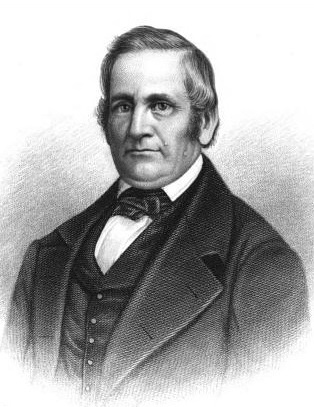
- Silas Hemenway Jenison (or Jennison), circa 1837

14th Governor of Vermont
- In office November 2, 1835 – October 15, 1841
- Lieutenant: David M. Camp (1836 on)
- Preceded by: William A. Palmer
- Succeeded by: Charles Paine

11th Lieutenant Governor of Vermont
- In office 1835–1836
- Governor: Himself
- Preceded by: Lebbeus Egerton
- Succeeded by: David M. Camp

Member of the Vermont House of Representatives
- In office 1829–1835

Personal details
- Born: Silas Hemenway Jensen; May 17, 1791 Shoreham, Vermont, U.S.
- Died: September 30, 1849 (aged 58) Shoreham, Vermont, U.S.
- Resting place: Jenison Cemetery; Shoreham, Vermont, U.S.
- Party: Whig
- Spouse: Marilla Hanks Bush

Silas Hemenway Jennison (May 17, 1791 – September 30, 1849) was an American Anti-Masonic and Whig politician who served as Vermont's 11th lieutenant governor and 14th governor of Vermont – the first born in the state.

== Biography ==
Jennison (Sometimes spelled Jenison) was born in Shoreham, Vermont to Levi Jennison and Ruth Hemenway. He helped his mother run the farm which his father had cleared and attended the local schools sporadically and had some private tutoring. He learned surveying which he pursued throughout his political career. He married Marilla Hanks Bush on May 3, 1814 and they had five children; Lurana Sandford, Levi, Ruth, Sara Cary and Laura Louisa.

== Career ==
Jennison was a member of the Vermont House of Representatives from 1829 to 1835. He was an Addison County Court Judge from and a member of the State Executive Council from 1829 to 1835. He was elected the Lieutenant Governor of Vermont in 1835. In the 1835 governor's race, no candidate received the majority required by the Vermont Constitution, so the choice fell to the Vermont General Assembly. After 63 ballots, the legislators were unable to decide upon a winner, and opted to allow Lieutenant Governor Jennison to act as governor until the next election. He was elected to a one-year term as governor in his own right in 1836, and was reelected annually until 1840, so he served as governor from 1835 to 1841. Jennison was Vermont's first native-born Governor.

In 1837, the incumbent Vermont State Treasurer, Augustine Clarke, failed to receive the majority of votes required by the Vermont Constitution. In such cases, the Vermont General Assembly is empowered to elect a candidate. The legislature, split between Anti-Masons, Whigs and Democrats, failed to choose a winner. Jennison, an Anti-Mason who had run with Whig support, then appointed Allen Wardner, an Anti-Mason. Wardner served until 1838.

Jennison declined reelection in 1841. He was appointed Addison County probate Judge, and he served until 1847.

Jennison was a delegate to the Constitutional Convention in 1843. The Addison County Agricultural Society was organized on January 22, 1844, and Jennison was the first president.

== Death ==
Following a long illness, Jennison died in Shoreham on September 30, 1849. He is interred at Jenison Cemetery, located within the town.

Party political offices
Preceded by Lebbeus Egerton	Anti-Masonic nominee for Lieutenant Governor of Vermont; 1835	Succeeded by None
Preceded by Samuel Clark	Whig nominee for Lieutenant Governor of Vermont; 1835	Succeeded by David M. Camp
Preceded by Horatio Seymour	Whig nominee for Governor of Vermont; 1836, 1837, 1838, 1839, 1840	Succeeded by Charles Paine
Political offices
Preceded by Lebbeus Egerton	Lieutenant Governor of Vermont; 1835–1836	Succeeded by David M. Camp
Preceded by William A. Palmer	Governor of Vermont; 1835–1841	Succeeded by Charles Paine
