= Leonard Sargeant =

American politician

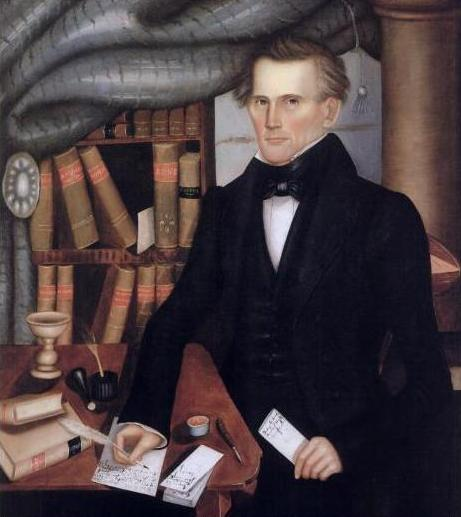
- "Vermont Lawyer," an 1841 painting. Based on analysis of photos at Manchester, Vermont's Masonic Lodge and Court House, the subject is Leonard Sargeant

15th Lieutenant governor of Vermont
- In office 1846–1848
- Governor: Horace Eaton
- Preceded by: Horace Eaton
- Succeeded by: Robert Pierpoint

Member of the Vermont Senate from Bennington County
- In office 1854–1855 Serving with Norman Millington
- Preceded by: John R. Gates, Norman Millington
- Succeeded by: Perez Harwood, Barber Thompson
- In office 1843–1844 Serving with Benjamin W. Morgan
- Preceded by: Josiah Wright, Benjamin W. Morgan
- Succeeded by: Asahel Hurd, Benjamin W. Morgan

State's Attorney of Bennington County, Vermont
- In office 1834–1837
- Preceded by: Milo Lyman Bennett
- Succeeded by: Samuel H. Blackmer

Member of the Vermont House of Representatives from Manchester
- In office 1841–1842
- Preceded by: Aaron Baker
- Succeeded by: John S. Pettibone
- In office 1836–1837
- Preceded by: Aaron Baker
- Succeeded by: Aaron Baker
- In office 1830–1832
- Preceded by: John S. Pettibone
- Succeeded by: Aaron Baker

Judge of the Vermont Probate Court's Manchester District
- In office 1850–1852
- Preceded by: Elias B. Burton
- Succeeded by: Harvey K. Fowler
- In office 1842–1845
- Preceded by: Loring Dean
- Succeeded by: Nathan Burton
- In office 1829–1831
- Preceded by: Milo Lyman Bennett
- Succeeded by: Myron Clark

Personal details
- Born: March 17, 1793 Dorset, Vermont, U.S.
- Died: June 18, 1880 (aged 87) Johnstown, Pennsylvania, U.S.
- Resting place: Dellwood Cemetery, Manchester, Vermont, U.S.
- Party: Whig
- Spouse: Phoebe Raymond (m. 1824)
- Children: 4
- Occupation: Attorney

Leonard Sargeant (March 17, 1793 – June 18, 1880) was a Vermont politician and lawyer who served as the 15th lieutenant governor of Vermont from 1846 to 1848.

== Early life ==
Sargeant was born in Dorset, Vermont on March 17, 1793, a son of Dr. John Sargeant and Delight (Bell) Sargeant. He studied law with Richard Skinner, was admitted to the bar, and practiced law in Manchester as Skinner's partner. Sargeant was also a farmer and served as Vice President of the Vermont Agricultural Society. He served in the War of 1812 as a member of the Vermont Militia company commanded by Abel Richardson. During the war, Sargeant made use of medical training obtained from his father to nurse sick and wounded soldiers. He was taken prisoner and held in Canada, where he remained until his father secured his release. In his later years, Sargeant received a pension for his wartime service.

He was active in the Whig party, and served in numerous offices including probate judge, state's attorney, postmaster and justice of the peace. He was a member of the Vermont Council of Censors in 1827, and a delegate to the 1836 Vermont constitutional convention.

His legal career included the noteworthy defense of Stephen and Jesse Boorn, brothers who were convicted and sentenced to life in prison (Jesse) and death (Stephen) for the killing of Russell Colvin, a man missing from Manchester. Several years later Colvin returned to Vermont to prove that he was still alive. He had moved to New Jersey after an altercation with the Boorns and changed his name. The Boorn case is the first known instance of a wrongful conviction for murder in the United States.

== Political career ==
Sargeant served in both the Vermont House of Representatives and Vermont Senate in the 1830s and 1840s. From 1846 to 1848 he served as Lieutenant Governor.

After leaving office, he practiced law until retiring in the 1870s.

== Retirement and death ==
In retirement, Sargeant resided at his daughter's home in Johnstown, Pennsylvania. He died in Johnstown on June 18, 1880, and was buried at Dellwood Cemetery in Manchester.

Party political offices
Preceded by Horace Eaton	Whig nominee for Lieutenant Governor of Vermont; 1846, 1847	Succeeded by Robert Pierpoint
Political offices
Preceded by Horace Eaton	Lieutenant Governor of Vermont; 1846–1848	Succeeded by Robert Pierpoint
