= Robert Pierpoint (Vermont politician) =

American politician

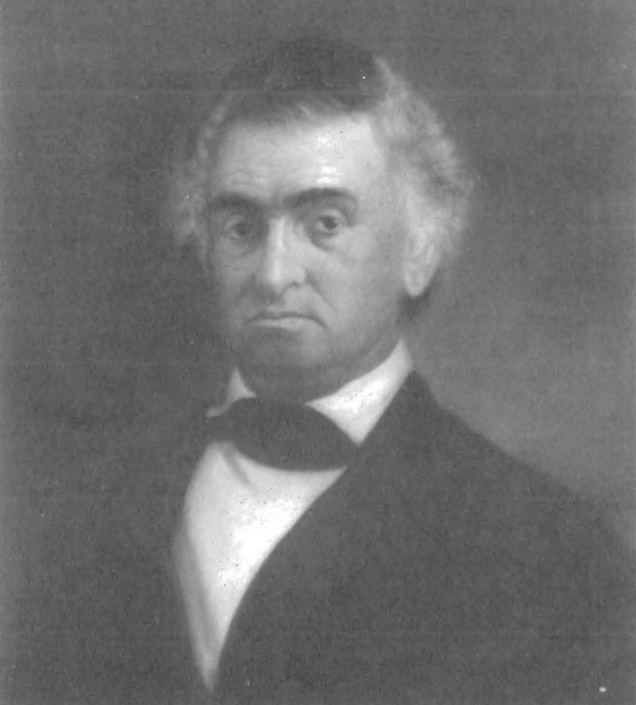
Robert Pierpoint, Vermont Lieutenant Governor

Robert Pierpoint (May 4, 1791 – September 23, 1864) was a Vermont politician and lawyer who served as 16th lieutenant governor of Vermont from 1848 to 1850.

== Early life ==
Robert Pierpoint was born in Litchfield, Connecticut on May 4, 1791, the son of Daniel and Sarah (Phelps) Pierpoint. His brother, John Pierpoint served as chief justice of the Vermont Supreme Court. He moved to Manchester, Vermont at age seven and lived with an uncle. At age 16 he began to study law with Governor Richard Skinner, and in 1812 he was admitted to the bar and began a practice, first in Manchester, and later in Rutland.

== Political career ==
Pierpoint was a U.S. Tax Collector for the War of 1812 and served as Rutland County Clerk from 1820 to 1839. He was a member of the Vermont House of Representatives in 1819 and 1823, and he was a member of the Governor's Council from 1825 to 1831. Pierpoint was also a Delegate to the Vermont constitutional conventions of 1822 and 1828, and he served as Rutland County's Probate Judge from 1832 to 1833. He was Clerk of the Vermont House from 1832 to 1834.

A Whig after the founding of that party, he served in the Vermont Senate from 1836 to 1840. From 1848 to 1850 Pierpoint was Lieutenant Governor, and he was a Circuit Court Judge from 1850 to 1856.

== Later life ==
Pierpoint was an original incorporator of the National Life Insurance Company. He served in the Vermont House of Representatives for the final time in 1857. He was also a longtime trustee of the University of Vermont, and received honorary degrees from that institution and Middlebury College.

== Death and burial ==
He died in Rutland on September 23, 1864 and was buried in Rutland's Evergreen Cemetery.

Party political offices
Preceded by Leonard Sargeant	Whig nominee for Lieutenant Governor of Vermont; 1848, 1849	Succeeded by Julius Converse
Political offices
Preceded by Leonard Sargeant	Lieutenant Governor of Vermont; 1848–1850	Succeeded by Julius Converse
