= 1834 Vermont gubernatorial election =

- September 2, 1834
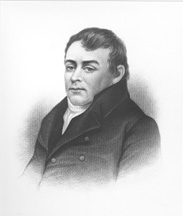

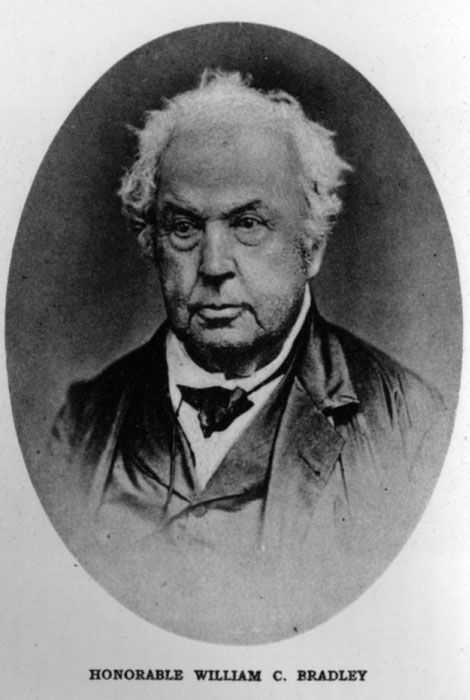

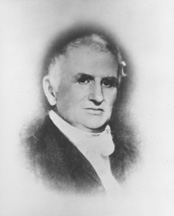
Nominee	William A. Palmer	William Czar Bradley	Horatio Seymour
Party	Anti-Masonic	Democratic	Whig
Electoral vote	147	13	2
Popular vote	17,131	10,365	10,159
Percentage	45.39%	27.47%	26.92%
- County results Palmer: 40–50% 50–60% 70–80% Bradley: 30–40% 40–50%
Governor before election
William A. Palmer
Anti-Masonic
Elected Governor
William A. Palmer
Anti-Masonic

The 1834 Vermont gubernatorial election took place in September and October, and resulted in the reelection of William A. Palmer to a one-year term as governor.

== Governor ==
The candidates for governor in the general election held on September 2, 1834, were: incumbent William A. Palmer (Anti-Masonic); William Czar Bradley (Democratic); and Horatio Seymour (Whig). In the general election, the General Assembly, which met in Montpelier on October 9, determined that the results were: total votes, 37,759; Palmer, 17,131 (45.4%); Bradley, 10,365 (27.5%); Seymour, 10,159 (26.9%); scattering, 84 (0.2%).

Because no candidate received the popular vote majority required by the Constitution of Vermont, the Vermont General Assembly was required to choose. In the assembly contest, Palmer won on the first ballot. With 168 votes cast, 85 were necessary for choice. The reported totals were: Palmer, 147; Bradley 13; William A. Griswold, 3; Samuel C. Crafts, 1; Daniel Pierce Thompson, 1; Seymour, 2; John Roberts, 1.

== Lieutenant governor ==
In the race for lieutenant governor, the total votes were 37,579. Anti-Mason and incumbent Lebbeus Egerton received 17,069 votes (45.4%). Democrat Truman Chittenden received 10,408 (27.7%). Whig Samuel Clark received 9,978 (26.6%). 124 (0.3%) were recorded as scattering.

In the vote by the Vermont General Assembly, Egerton was elected with 114 votes. Clark received 69 and Chittenden 28. Robert Pierpoint received 1 vote, Jedediah Harris received 1, and Edwin Egerton received 1.

== Treasurer ==
There were 37,458 votes cast for state treasurer. Anti-Mason and incumbent Augustine Clarke received 17,063 (45.6%). Democrat Charles R. Cleaves received 10,337 (27.6%), and Whig John Spaulding received 9,903 (26.4%). 155 (0.4%) votes were recorded as scattering.

In the general assembly contest, Clarke won with 111 votes. Spaulding received 76 votes, Cleaves received 19, and Thomas D. Hammond received 1.

== Results ==
1834 Vermont gubernatorial election
Party	Candidate	Votes	%	±%
Anti-Masonic	William A. Palmer (Inc.)	17,131	45.39	
Democratic	William Czar Bradley	10,365	27.47	
Whig	Horatio Seymour	10,159	26.92	
	Scattering	84	0.22	
Total votes		37,739	100.0	
