= List of people from Burlington, Vermont =

The following list includes notable people who were born or have lived in Burlington, Vermont.

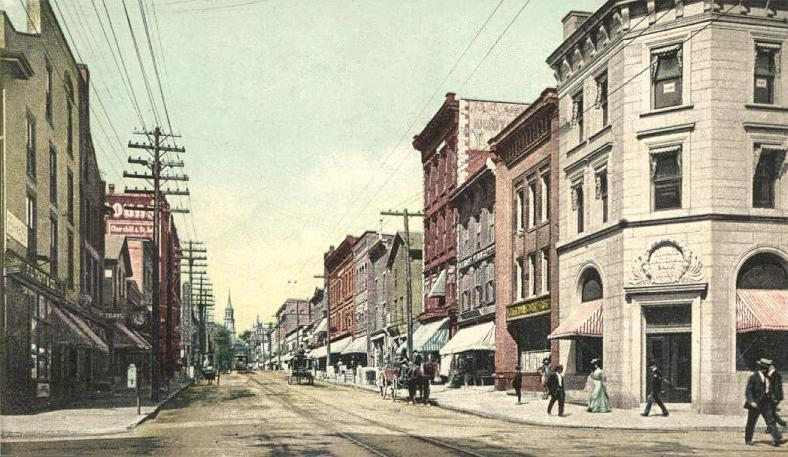
Church Street in 1907

== Academics and educators ==
- Ralph Abraham, mathematician
- Murray Bookchin, ecologist and anarchist/Communalist philosopher
- Davis Rich Dewey, economist and statistician
- John Dewey, philosopher, psychologist and educational reformer
- Fred Householder, linguist
- Jacqueline Noonan, cardiologist and professor
- Henry Farnham Perkins, zoologist, professor and eugenicist
- Timothy Steele, poet and academic

== Actors and theater figures ==
- Orson Bean, film, television and stage actor
- Ben Bagley, musical theater producer and innovator
- Field Cate, actor, musician
- Luis Guzmán, actor
- Will Lyman, actor
- Kevin McKenzie, artistic director, American Ballet Theatre
- Alessandro Nivola, actor and producer

== Artists and illustrators ==
- Tom Atwood, photographer
- Marc Awodey, artist and writer
- Alison Bechdel, cartoonist known for comic strip Dykes to Watch Out For
- James Kochalka, cartoonist, singer/songwriter
- Shane Lavalette, photographer, publisher, artist
- Joseph Mozier, sculptor
- Truman Seymour, watercolorist, military figure

== Athletes and athletics personnel ==
- Jeanne Ashworth, skater
- Harry Blanchard, Formula One driver, raced for Porsche team
- Kelly Clark, snowboarder
- Jimmy Cochran, former Olympic and World Cup alpine ski racer and member of the Skiing Cochrans
- Ryan Cochran-Siegle, Olympic and World Cup Alpine ski racer and member of the Skiing Cochrans
- Paul Hackett, football coach
- Doc Hazelton, professional baseball player and college coach
- Tim Kelley, former World Cup alpine ski racer and member of the Skiing Cochrans
- Robby Kelley, World Cup alpine ski racer and member of the Skiing Cochrans
- Billy Kidd, world champion and Olympic skier
- Jeremy Kimball, mixed martial artist
- Joe Kirkwood Sr., golfer
- Ilona Maher, rugby union player, Olympic bronze medalist
- Ross Miner (born 1991), skating coach and retired competitive figure skater
- Ross Powers, snowboarder, Olympic gold medalist
- Patrick Sharp, National Hockey League player, attended University of Vermont
- LJ Strenio, professional freestyle skier
- Birdie Tebbetts, Major League Baseball player and manager
- Mark Warburton, gymnast
- Len Whitehouse, baseball player and assistant coach of Burlington High School's varsity baseball team

== Business figures ==
- Ben Cohen, co-founder of Ben & Jerry's
- Jerry Greenfield, co-founder of Ben & Jerry's
- Greg Noonan, early American brew master
- William Hepburn Russell, founder of Pony Express
- Gustavus Blin Wright, roadbuilder and entrepreneur

== Lawyers and jurists ==
- Albert Wheeler Coffrin, judge
- George Gale, judge
- Seneca Haselton, associate justice of the Vermont Supreme Court, mayor of Burlington, U.S. minister to Venezuela
- John A. Lovely, Minnesota Supreme Court justice
- Joseph A. McNamara, U.S. attorney for Vermont
- Eric Miller, U.S. attorney for Vermont
- Sherman R. Moulton, chief justice of the Vermont Supreme Court
- Jerome O'Neill, U.S. attorney for Vermont
- Daniel Roberts, attorney
- John C. Thompson, justice of the Vermont Supreme Court

== Military figures ==
- George Grenville Benedict, Civil War recipient of the Medal of Honor and delegate to the Republican National Convention
- Francis William Billado, United States Army major general and adjutant general of the Vermont National Guard
- Reginald M. Cram, United States Air Force major general and adjutant general of the Vermont National Guard
- George Dewey, admiral; hero of the Manilla Bay Campaign of the Spanish American War
- Charles Doolittle, brevet major general and regimental commander in the Union Army during the American Civil War
- Oliver O. Howard, major general, Civil War veteran, United States Military Academy commandant, Medal of Honor recipient
- Stephen Perry Jocelyn, U.S. Army brigadier general, lived in Burlington during retirement
- Henry T. Mayo, United States Navy admiral, Atlantic Fleet commander in World War I
- Crosby P. Miller, U.S. Army brigadier general, retired to Burlington
- Theodore S. Peck, Civil War recipient of the Medal of Honor and adjutant general of the Vermont National Guard
- Truman Seymour, Mexican–American War and Civil War veteran who attained the rank of major general
- Alfred A. Starbird, U.S. Army brigadier general
- William Wells, Civil War recipient of the Medal of Honor and adjutant general of the Vermont National Guard
- William I. Westervelt, U.S. Army brigadier general

== Musicians ==
- Morton Estrin, pianist
- Tristan Honsinger, musician
- Eugene Hütz, actor and lead singer of Gogol Bordello
- Peter McPoland, singer-songwriter
- Nothing, Nowhere, musician
- Morgan Page, electronic dance music artist
- Members of the rock band Phish:
  - Trey Anastasio, guitarist
  - Jon Fishman, drummer
  - Mike Gordon, bassist
  - Page McConnell, keyboardist
- Peter Pisarczyk, musician

== Politicians ==
- Ebenezer Allen, soldier, pioneer, and member of the Vermont General Assembly
- Harold J. Arthur, 68th governor of Vermont
- Warren Austin, senator from Vermont and ambassador to the United Nations
- Walter J. Bigelow, mayor of Burlington
- Calvin H. Blodgett, mayor of Burlington
- Rufus E. Brown, Vermont attorney general, member of Vermont State Senate
- Vernon A. Bullard, United States attorney for the District of Vermont
- John J. Burns, mayor of Burlington
- Peter Clavelle, mayor of Burlington
- Grace Coolidge, first lady, wife of Calvin Coolidge
- William A. Crombie, mayor of Burlington, Vermont
- Frank H. Davis, Vermont state treasurer
- Howard Dean, former chairman of the Democratic National Committee, presidential candidate in 2004, and 79th governor of Vermont
- Judith Steinberg Dean, physician and First Lady of Vermont
- Luther C. Dodge, mayor of Burlington
- Johannah Leddy Donovan, Vermont state representative
- Louis F. Dow, mayor of Burlington 1935–1939
- Albert S. Drew, mayor of Burlington
- David J. Foster, congressman
- Aaron H. Grout, Vermont secretary of state; son of Governor Josiah Grout
- Isaac R. Harrington, mayor of Buffalo, New York
- Joseph D. Hatch, Vermont state legislator and mayor of Burlington, Vermont
- Donly C. Hawley, mayor of Burlington, Vermont
- Henry Hitchcock, first attorney general of Alabama
- Philip H. Hoff, 73rd governor of Vermont
- Bob Kiss, mayor of Burlington
- Madeleine M. Kunin, diplomat and 77th governor of Vermont
- Patrick Leahy, senator from Vermont 1975–2023
- James P. Leddy, politician
- Jason Lorber, politician
- Heman Lowry, U.S. marshal for Vermont
- Earle B. McLaughlin, U.S. marshal for Vermont
- George H. Morse, mayor of Burlington
- Jason Niles, congressman
- Hamilton S. Peck, mayor of Burlington, state legislator, city court judge
- Doug Racine, member of the Vermont Senate and lieutenant governor
- Robert Roberts, mayor of Burlington
- John E. Rouille, U.S. marshal for Vermont
- Bernie Sanders, former mayor of Burlington (1981–1989), U.S. senator from Vermont since 2007, and 2016 and 2020 Democratic presidential candidate
- Charles Plympton Smith, banker and politician
- Thomas W. Sorrell, U.S. marshal for Vermont
- William Sorrell, attorney general of Vermont
- Jake Sullivan, U.S. national security advisor
- Elliot M. Sutton, mayor of Burlington
- Cornelius P. Van Ness, 10th governor of Vermont
- Martin Joseph Wade, congressman and judge
- Urban A. Woodbury, businessman and 45th governor of Vermont

== Writers ==
- Dan Chiasson, poet
- Jack Du Brul, author
- John C. Farrar, editor, writer and publisher
- Theodora Agnes Peck, novelist and poet
- Suzi Wizowaty, author and politician

== Others ==
- Ted Bundy, serial killer, born at the Elizabeth Lund Home for Unwed Mothers
- David E. Demag, U.S. marshal for Vermont
- Truman C. Everts, Washburn–Langford–Doane Expedition
- Mary Fletcher, philanthropist and founder of the future University of Vermont Medical Center
- Horatio Nelson Jackson, first person to drive an automobile across the U.S.
- Bradley J. LaRose, U.S. marshal for Vermont
- Brianna Maitland, missing girl
- Peter Santenello, videomaker, traveler, and entrepreneur
