= James Edmund Burke =

American politician

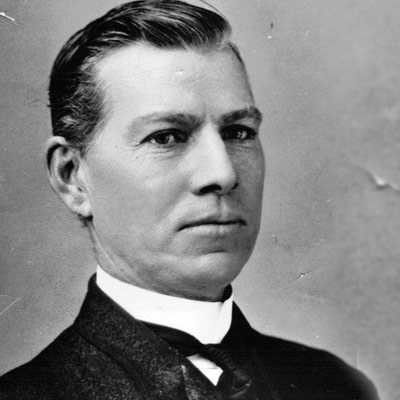

18th, 20th, 22nd, and 27th Mayor of Burlington, Vermont
- In office April 3, 1933 – March 31, 1935
- Preceded by: John Holmes Jackson
- Succeeded by: Louis F. Dow
- In office April 7, 1913 – April 4, 1915
- Preceded by: Robert Roberts
- Succeeded by: Albert S. Drew
- In office April 5, 1909 – April 2, 1911
- Preceded by: Walter J. Bigelow
- Succeeded by: Robert Roberts
- In office June 1, 1903 – March 31, 1907
- Preceded by: Donly C. Hawley
- Succeeded by: Walter J. Bigelow

Member of the Vermont House of Representatives from Burlington
- In office 1937–1939
- Preceded by: Justin Kelly
- Succeeded by: John J. Burns
- In office 1931–1935
- Preceded by: Hamilton S. Peck
- Succeeded by: Justin Kelly
- In office 1925–1927
- Preceded by: Levi P. Smith
- Succeeded by: Hamilton S. Peck

Personal details
- Born: April 23, 1849 Williston, Vermont, U.S.
- Died: May 4, 1943 (aged 94) Burlington, Vermont, U.S.
- Resting place: Saint Joseph Cemetery, Burlington, Vermont, U.S.
- Party: Democratic
- Spouse: Sarah Roakes (m. 1870)
- Children: 10
- Occupation: Blacksmith

James Edmund Burke (April 23, 1849 – May 4, 1943) was an American politician who served as the 18th, 20th, 22nd, and 27th mayor of Burlington, Vermont. A Democrat, he also served in the Vermont House of Representatives from 1925 to 1927, 1931 to 1935, and 1937 to 1939.

== Early life ==
James Edmund Burke was born in Williston, Vermont on April 23, 1849, a son of Irish immigrants James and Ann Burke; his parents named him for Irish statesman Edmund Burke. He was educated in the public schools of Williston and at Williston Academy. In 1870 Burke married Sarah Roakes and in May 1873, they moved to Burlington, where he worked as a blacksmith.

== Burlington politics and government ==
Burke became involved in politics as a Democrat in the 1890s and was a founder of Burlington's Young Men's Democratic Club. He became involved in Burlington's city affairs when he was appointed to local positions including election day ballot clerk, and he was elected an alderman from the 4th Ward in 1893. In the mid to late 1890s, Burke also served on the school board and as a member of the board of police commissioners.

In 1900 he made his first attempt for Burlington's mayoralty, but was defeated by incumbent Robert Roberts. In 1902 he ran for mayor against incumbent Mayor Donly C. Hawley and was defeated in a landslide along with the rest of the city Democrats.

In 1903 he ran against Hawley again and was initially defeated by three votes, but after a recount and a ruling by the state supreme court Burke was declared as the winner in May. During his first term as mayor, Burke suspended the chief of police and launched an investigation into the police department, oversaw the establishment of the city's electric department and completion of the electrical infrastructure construction. He was easily reelected in 1904 against R. E. Brown with 1,965 votes to 1,495 votes. Burke served as Burlington's postmaster 1915 to 1923.

In 1929 he ran for mayor of Burlington and was defeated in a landslide by former mayor John Holmes Jackson with 3,425 votes to 2,354 votes. During the 1933 Burlington mayoral election incumbent Mayor Jackson chose not to run for reelection and endorsed Burke. In his fourth term he oversaw the creation of what would become the Burlington International Airport; in 1934, during his 5th term, he presented to Amelia Earhart the keys to the city at the airport.

== State politics and government ==
In 1900 and 1902 he was selected as one of Burlington's delegates to the Vermont Democratic state convention. In 1902, Burke ran for Vermont Secretary of State. In 1904 he served as a delegate to the Democratic National Convention. He was the unsuccessful Democratic nominee for Governor of Vermont in 1908. Burke was a delegate to the 1936 state convention.

In 1912, Burke engaged in an extended feud with Thomas H. Browne, Vermont's member of the Democratic National Committee and unsuccessfully attempted to have him replaced by James E. Burke of West Rutland. Later that year, Burke campaigned for Woodrow Wilson for president. During World War I, Burke joined a statewide speaker's bureau that made speeches in support of fundraising for the American Red Cross and other wartime causes.

Burke represented Burlington in the Vermont House of Representatives from 1925 to 1927, 1931 to 1935, and 1937 to 1939. In his final term, Burke was the oldest member of the legislature, and was recognized as the dean of the House.

== Death and burial ==
On May 4, 1943, Burke died in Burlington after a short illness. He was buried at Saint Joseph Cemetery in Burlington.

== Electoral history ==
James Edmund Burke electoral history

1900 Burlington mayoral election
Party	Candidate	Votes	%
Republican	Robert Roberts	1,613	55.13%
Democratic	James Edmund Burke	1,313	44.87%
Total votes		2,926	100%

1902 Burlington mayoral election
Party	Candidate	Votes	%
Republican	Donly C. Hawley	1,645	59.41%
Democratic	James Edmund Burke	1,123	40.56%
Independent	write-in	1	0.04%
Total votes		2,769	100%

1904 Burlington mayoral election
Party	Candidate	Votes	%
Democratic	James Edmund Burke	1,965	56.22%
Republican	R. E. Brown	1,495	42.78%
Independent	H. P. Monahan	35	1.00%
Total votes		3,495	100%

1908 Vermont gubernatorial election
Party	Candidate	Votes	%
Republican	George H. Prouty	45,598	70.83%
Democratic	James Edmund Burke	15,953	24.78%
Independent	Quimby S. Backus	1,351	2.10%
Prohibition	Eugene M. Campbell	918	1.43%
Socialist	J. H. Dunbar	547	0.85%
Independent	Other	12	0.02%
Total votes		64,379	100%

1929 Burlington mayoral election
Party	Candidate	Votes	%
Democratic	John Holmes Jackson	3,425	59.27%
Progressive Party (United States, 1924)	James Edmund Burke	2,354	40.73%
Total votes		5,779	100%

== Works cited ==
- "Democrats Name Their Delegates". The Burlington Free Press. May 5, 1936. p. 10 – via Newspapers.com.

Party political offices
Preceded by Percival W. Clement	Democratic nominee for Governor of Vermont; 1908	Succeeded by Charles D. Watson
Political offices
Preceded by Donly C. Hawley	Mayor of Burlington, Vermont; 1903–1907	Succeeded by Walter J. Bigelow
Preceded by Walter J. Bigelow	Mayor of Burlington, Vermont; 1909–1911	Succeeded by Robert Roberts
Preceded by Robert Roberts	Mayor of Burlington, Vermont; 1913–1915	Succeeded by Albert S. Drew
Preceded by John Holmes Jackson	Mayor of Burlington, Vermont; 1933–1935	Succeeded by Louis F. Dow
