= Daniel Roberts (attorney) =

American attorney (1811–1899)

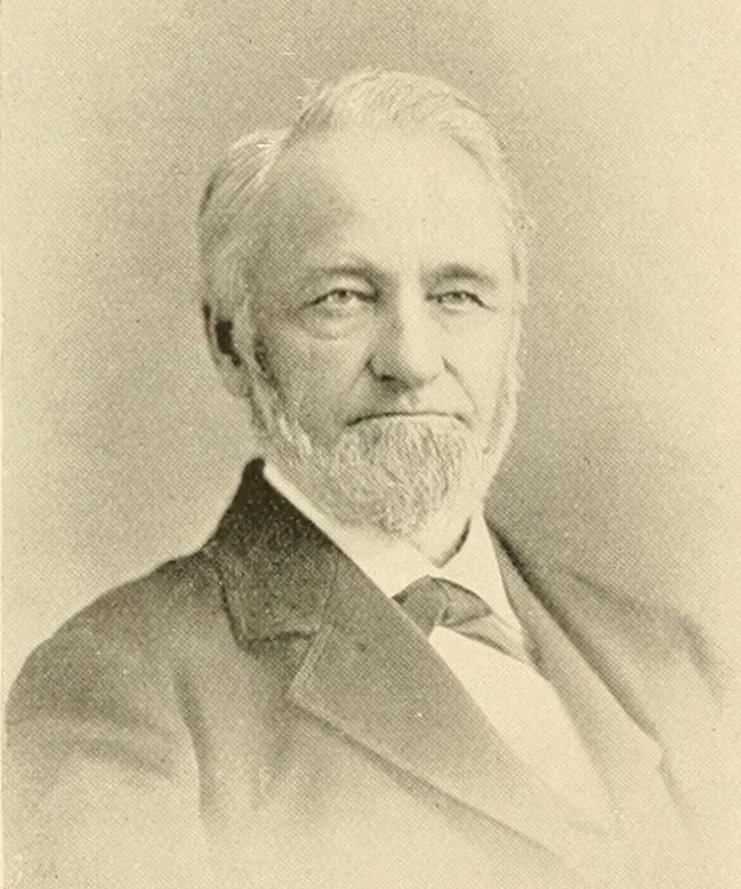
- From 1894's Men of Vermont Illustrated

President of the Vermont Bar Association
- In office 1881–1882
- Preceded by: Walter C. Dunton
- Succeeded by: James Barrett

State's Attorney of Chittenden County, Vermont
- In office 1868–1869
- Preceded by: Leverett B. Englesby
- Succeeded by: Eleazer R. Hard

Personal details
- Born: May 11, 1811 Wallingford, Vermont, U.S.
- Died: October 6, 1899 (aged 88) Burlington, Vermont, U.S.
- Resting place: Lakeview Cemetery, Burlington, Vermont, U.S.
- Party: Republican
- Other political affiliations: Liberty; Free Soil; Democratic; Liberal Republican
- Spouse: Caroline (Martindale) Roberts (m. 1837–1886, her death)
- Children: 4 (including Robert Roberts)
- Education: Middlebury College
- Profession: Attorney

Daniel Roberts (May 11, 1811 – October 6, 1899) was an American attorney and politician from Vermont. Involved in the Abolitionist movement as well as reform causes including Temperance, he was active in the Liberty, Free Soil, and Democratic parties before becoming identified with the Republican Party when it was founded in the mid-1850s as America's main antislavery party.

A native of Wallingford, Vermont and 1829 graduate of Middlebury College, Roberts practiced in Manchester and Burlington. In addition to publishing a well-regarded digest of decisions of the Vermont Supreme Court, he served a term as president of the Vermont Bar Association. In 1872, he became identified with the Liberal Republican Party, but he later returned to the regular Republican fold.

Roberts was the father of Robert Roberts, an attorney and politician who served as mayor of Burlington. Roberts died in Burlington on October 6, 1899. He was buried at Lakeview Cemetery in Burlington.

== Early life ==
Daniel Roberts was born in Wallingford, Vermont on May 11, 1811, a son of American Revolutionary War veteran Daniel Roberts (d. 1852) and Almira (Bishop) Roberts. The senior Daniel Roberts was a traveling teacher and schoolmaster who eventually settled in Manchester, Vermont, where he owned and operated a farm. The younger Daniel Roberts was raised in Manchester, tutored by Reverend Eli Meeker, and attended the academy in Chester, Vermont.

Roberts began attending Middlebury College at age 14, and graduated with a A.B. degree in 1829. His classmates included Calvin T. Hulburd and Edwin Lawrence, and Roberts participated in alumni activities throughout his life. He was later awarded his A.M. degree, and in 1879, Middlebury presented Roberts the honorary degree of LL.D. After graduating from college, Roberts studied law with Judge Harvey Button of Wallingford and attained admission to the bar in 1832.

== Start of career ==
After becoming licensed as an attorney, Roberts traveled west seeking business opportunities and to establish a law practice, which included time in New York, Ohio, Mississippi, Louisiana, and Illinois. From 1833 to 1835, he practiced law in Jacksonville, Illinois, where he became friendly with Stephen A. Douglas. In 1893, Harper's Magazine published an account of Roberts' memories of Douglas. In 1835, Roberts returned to Vermont, where he settled in Manchester and succeeded to the legal business of Milo Lyman Bennett, who moved to Maine to pursue a business opportunity before returning to Vermont two years later. Besides practicing law, Roberts occasionally wrote poetry, and his work appeared in Abby Maria Hemenway's Poets and Poetry of Vermont. In 1837, Roberts married Caroline Martindale of Wallingford and they were married until her death in 1886. Daniel and Caroline Roberts were the parents of four children—Mary, Caroline, Stephen, and Robert. Robert Roberts was an attorney who served as mayor of Burlington, Vermont.

Roberts practiced law in Manchester for the next twenty years, and became involved in politics as an anti-slavery and temperance activist, which he pursued as a member of the Liberty, Free Soil, and Democratic parties. While residing in Manchester, Roberts served in local offices including justice of the peace, and participated in the Underground Railroad. He was also a member of the Vermont Militia in the 1830s and 1840s, serving as inspector of the 1st Brigade of the 1st Division with the rank of major. In 1853, Roberts moved to Burlington, Vermont, where he continued his Underground Railroad activities and practiced law in partnership with Lucius E. Chittenden. When the Republican Party was founded in the mid-1850s as the main U.S. anti-slavery party, Roberts became identified with it.

== Later career ==
In addition to practicing law, Roberts served as a state bank commissioner from 1853 to 1854, a position in which he was responsible for inspecting and providing reports on the condition of Vermont's financial institutions. A supporter of the Union during the American Civil War, from 1865 to 1866, he was a special agent of the United States Department of the Treasury, which required him to oversee the collection of customs duties in Vermont and their submission to the federal government. Roberts served as Burlington's city attorney for several terms, and also authored and published Roberts' Vermont Digest, a compilation of summaries of Vermont Supreme Court decisions that Vermont's attorneys used for decades as a standard reference work. In 1868, Roberts was elected state's attorney of Chittenden County, and he served a one-year term.

Roberts became identified with the Liberal Republican Party in 1872, which was formed in opposition to the scandals of the Ulysses S. Grant administration, and he served as chairman of the party's Chittenden County nominating convention. When the Liberal Republican movement ended, Roberts rejoined the regular Republican Party, and in 1876, he was president of Burlington's Hayes and Wheeler Club. In 1877, he was the orator of the day at the centennial celebration of the Battle of Bennington, and his speech was published as part of the event's official proceedings. Roberts was a longtime director of the Vermont Life Insurance Company, and in 1885 he was elected president and chairman of the company's executive committee. Roberts was elected president of the Vermont Bar Association in 1881, and served a one-year term. In 1889, Roberts joined the Sons of the Revolution and was elected to the Vermont division's board of managers.

Roberts died in Burlington on October 6, 1899. He was buried at Lakeview Cemetery in Burlington.
