= The Caledonian-Record =

Daily newspaper in Vermont, US

- Type: Daily newspaper
- Format: Broadsheet
- Publisher: Todd M. Smith
- Editor: Dana Gray
- Staff writers: 36 (2007)
- Founded: 1837
- Headquarters: 190 Federal Street; St. Johnsbury, Vermont 05819 United States
- Circulation: 10,204 (as of 2013)
- ISSN: 1054-3716
- OCLC number: 12180513
- Website: caledonianrecord.com

The Caledonian-Record is a daily newspaper published in St. Johnsbury, Vermont and primarily circulates throughout Caledonia County. It was established in 1837. It employed a total staff of 36 as of 2007.

== Circulation ==
The paper is distributed in the Northeast Kingdom of Vermont and the western portion of Coos County, New Hampshire. It maintains a New Hampshire office located at 263 Main Street in Littleton, New Hampshire. It is published daily except Sunday and some holidays.

The Caledonian has focused on local news from 50 communities, which are located in three Vermont counties and two New Hampshire ones. The average daily net paid circulation has dipped from a peak of about 12,500 about 1999 to the six months ending March 2013 at 10,204.

Penetration of the primary market area of St. Johnsbury and Lyndonville was under 93%. For the area immediately surrounding St. Johnsbury the Caledonian provided coverage of 80% of the occupied households.

== History ==
Albert G. Chadwick began publishing the paper as a weekly in August, 1837. It is the oldest paper in the county. It started as a four-page, twenty-four column paper.

It was a Whig paper when it started. At the time, Vermont was strongly Whig. The paper advocated the principles of the Free Soil element and became an early adherent and unswerving supporter of the principles of the Republican Party. It was edited and published by its founder for 18 years. George D. Rand and Charles M. Stone bought it in July 1855. Stone became the sole owner, editor and publisher in April 1857.

In 1875 it was still a weekly newspaper. Subscribers paid $1.50 a year. In 1909, Walter J. Bigelow, a former mayor of Burlington, Vermont, purchased the St. Johnsbury Caledonian, which he turned into a daily newspaper.

In the 20th century, the paper was bought by a former Hearst reporter from Boston, Herb Smith. His son, Gordon Smith, Class of 1941 at Yale, joined the paper on the business side upon graduation and went on to own and publish the paper. Gordon brought with him as a writer who stayed a year; a classmate, Barry Zorthian.

== Caledonian-Record Pub. Co., Inc. v. VT State College ==
The Caledonian garnered attention in 2003 over a court case entitled Caledonian-Record Pub. Co., Inc. v. VT State College. The Caledonian wanted to have access to student disciplinary records and hearings from Lyndon State College. Lyndon state claimed that it was exempt from making the requested information public per the Vermont Public Records Act and the Open Meetings Law. The local court sided with Lyndon State College, and an appeal to the Vermont Supreme Court followed. The Vermont Supreme Court upheld the verdict. Julie Fothergill, an attorney with the Vermont League of Cities and Towns, stated that the ruling "is important for all public bodies because it indicates how the Court may interpret other exceptions to the Public Records Law."

== Operations ==
Besides the Caledonian, the paper also published the Orleans County Record and the Littleton Record.

In 2007 the paper employed a staff of 40. Sales ranged from $1 to $5 million annually.

In 2007 the paper partnered with the American Society of News Editors at Lyndon Institute to publish a school newspaper, the first at the school, entitled The Campus News.

In 2008 the paper outsourced the printing of the paper to Upper Valley Press in Haverhill, New Hampshire, citing equipment, quality control and personnel problems.

In 2017, the paper was family owned.

== Controversies ==
In its coverage of the 2017 fire that destroyed the home of singer-songwriter Neko Case, the paper included Case's name despite her ongoing issues with stalkers and threats to her and her family. The paper maintains that it followed its typical public safety reporting standards.
