= Calvin H. Blodgett =

Mayor of Burlington, Vermont

Mayor of Burlington, Vermont
- In office 1874–1876
- Preceded by: Luther C. Dodge
- Succeeded by: Joseph D. Hatch

Personal details
- Born: April 7, 1827 Randolph Center, Vermont
- Died: August 3, 1919 (aged 92) Bakersfield, Vermont
- Resting place: Lakeview Cemetery, Burlington, Vermont
- Party: Democratic
- Spouse(s): Mandana Moody (m. 1853-1854, her death); Julia Jenness (m. 1856-1863, her death); Evaline Pitkin Bill (m. 1865-1885, her death); Florence Lillian Spaulding (m. 1890-1919, his death)
- Children: 4
- Education: Middlebury Seminary
- Profession: Businessman

Calvin H. Blodgett (April 7, 1827 – August 3, 1919) was a businessman and politician from Burlington, Vermont. A Democrat, he served as a member of Burlington's board of aldermen and was the city's mayor from 1874 to 1876.

== Biography ==
Calvin Henry Blodgett was born in Randolph Center, Vermont on April 7, 1817, a son of Calvin Blodgett and Luthera (Bissell) Blodgett. Calvin Blodgett was long active in politics and government, including service as an assistant judge of Orange County, terms in the state legislature, and election to Burlington's board of aldermen. Calvin H. Blodgett was educated in Randolph and attended Middlebury Seminary.

In 1850, Blodgett and his father opened a wholesale grocery business in Waterbury, which they operated until moving to Burlington 1858. The Blodgetts then became lumber dealers as the firm of C. Blodgett & Son. Their venture proved successful and grew to include timber lands in Michigan and Canada. Calvin Blodgett died in 1873, and Calvin H. Blodgett operated the lumber business until 1876. Blodgett also invested in several other businesses, including Burlington's Merchants National Bank, Champlain Mutual Insurance Company, and Vermont Horse Stock Company. He was also active in several civic organizations, including serving as a director of the Burlington Board of Trade.

A Democrat, Blodgett represented Burlington's 6th Ward on the Board of Aldermen from 1872 to 1874. In 1874, he was elected Burlington's mayor, and he served until 1876. Blodgett's term as mayor was mainly concerned with reducing government expenditures in order to lower the city's property tax rate. In addition, he implemented improvements to the police department, including regular salaries for patrol officers working nighttime shifts. Prior to Blodgett's term, police officers were paid based on the actions they executed, such as the number of arrests. Under Blodgett's reforms, officers on night patrol in the city received two dollars per shift. Officers patrolling the train depot, waterfront docks, and Battery Street industrial area received one dollar per shift.

In 1878, a period of ill health caused Blodgett's doctors to recommend that he move away from the Lake Champlain area to a town with a drier climate. In 1880, he moved to Bakersfield, where he resided until his death.

Blodgett died in Bakersfield on August 3, 1919. He was buried at Lakeview Cemetery in Burlington.

== Family ==
Blodgett was married four times. His first wife was Mandana Moody; they married in 1853, and she died in 1854. In 1856, he married Julia Jenness, who died in 1863. His third wife was Evaline (or Everline) Pitkin Bill; they married in 1865, and she died in 1885. His fourth wife was Florence Lillian Spaulding (b. 1856); they married in 1890 and she died in 1931.

Blodgett's children included Julia M. (1857-1937), Eva L. (1859-1888), John C. (1861-1862), and Calvin B. (born and died in 1869). Julia Blodgett was the wife of George A. Smythe and they resided in Pasadena, California.

== Sources ==
=== Newspapers ===
- "Death Notice, Mandana G. Blodgett". Vermont Christian Messenger. Montpelier, VT. September 13, 1854. p. 3 – via Newspapers.com.
- "Death Notice, Julia Jenness Blodgett". The Daily Journal. Montpelier, VT. October 3, 1863. p. 3 – via Newspapers.com.
- "Burlington: Champlain Mutual Insurance Company". Rutland Herald. Rutland, VT. April 6, 1871. p. 2 – via Newspapers.com.
- "Board of Trade - Annual Meeting". Burlington Free Press. Burlington, VT. May 18, 1872. p. 3 – via Newspapers.com.
- "Annual Meeting of the Vermont Horse Stock Company". Burlington Free Press. Burlington, VT. January 9, 1873. p. 3 – via Newspapers.com.
- "Hon. Calvin Blodgett". Argus and Patriot. Montpelier, VT. October 23, 1873. p. 2 – via Newspapers.com.
- "Marriage Notice, Calvin H. Blodgett and Eveline P. Bill". Burlington Free Press. Burlington, VT. June 16, 1865. p. 3 – via Newspapers.com.
- "Death Notice, Eveline Pitkin Bill". Burlington Free Press. Burlington, VT. March 9, 1885. p. 2 – via Newspapers.com.
- "West Topsham: Eva Blodgett". Vermont Watchman and State Journal. Montpelier, VT. August 29, 1888. p. 5 – via Newspapers.com.
- "Bakersfield: Funeral of the Hon. Calvin H. Blodgett to be Held To-Day". Burlington Free Press. Burlington, VT. August 5, 1919. p. 3 – via Newspapers.com.
- "Funeral of Ex-Mayor Blodgett". Burlington Free Press. Burlington, VT. August 7, 1919. p. 5 – via Newspapers.com.
- "Death Notice, Prof. George A. Smythe". Burlington Free Press. Burlington, VT. May 7, 1935. p. 10 – via Newspapers.com.
- "Obituary: Mrs Florence Spaulding Blodgett". Burlington Free Press. Burlington, VT. April 27, 1931. p. 5 – via Newspapers.com.

=== Books ===
- Beerworth, Jeffrey H. (2015). Historic Crimes and Justice in Burlington, Vermont. Charleston, SC: The History Press. pp. 23, 36. ISBN 978-1-46711-840-8 – via Google Books.

=== Internet ===
- "Vermont Vital Records, 1720-1908, Death Record for Mandana (Moody) Blodgett". Ancestry.com. Lehi, UT: Ancestry.com, LLC. September 1, 1854.
- "Vermont Vital Records, 1720-1908, Marriage Record for Calvin H. Blodgett and Julia A. Jenness". Ancestry.com. Lehi, UT: Ancestry.com, LLC. February 19, 1856.
- "Vermont Vital Records, 1720-1908, Death Record for John C. Blodgett". Ancestry.com. Lehi, UT: Ancestry.com, LLC. May 27, 1862.
- "Vermont Vital Records, 1720-1908, Birth Record for Calvin B. Blodgett". Ancestry.com. Lehi, UT: Ancestry.com, LLC. February 1, 1869.
- "Vermont Vital Records, 1720-1908, Death Record for Calvin B. Blodgett". Ancestry.com. Lehi, UT: Ancestry.com, LLC. July 23, 1869.
- "United States Census, 1900, Entry for Calvin H. Blodgett Family". Ancestry.com. Lehi, UT: Ancestry.com, LLC. 1900.
- "Vermont Death Records, 1909-2008, Entry for Calvin Henry Blodgett". Ancestry.com. Lehi, UT: Ancestry.com, LLC. August 3, 1919.
- "California, Death Index, 1905-1939, Entry for Julia Blodgett Smyth". Ancestry.com. Lehi, UT: Ancestry.com, LLC. 1939.
