= Robert Roberts (American politician) =

Mayor of Burlington, Vermont

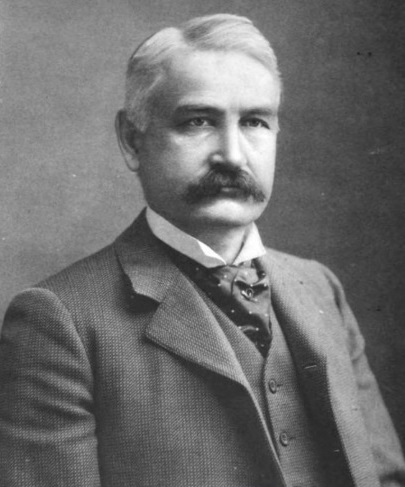
- From 1894's Encyclopedia of Vermont Biography

Mayor of Burlington, Vermont
- In office 1911–1913
- Preceded by: James Edmund Burke
- Succeeded by: James Edmund Burke
- In office 1899–1901
- Preceded by: Elliot M. Sutton
- Succeeded by: Donly C. Hawley

Member of the Vermont Senate from Chittenden County
- In office 1890–1892 Serving with Henry H. Rankin, Isaiah Dow
- Preceded by: Elihu B. Taft, Londus F. Terrill, W. Wallace Higbee
- Succeeded by: David J. Foster, Samuel A. Brownell, Henry C. Gleason

Member of the Vermont House of Representatives from Burlington
- In office 1882–1884
- Preceded by: Russell S. Taft
- Succeeded by: Curtis Ahira Hibbard

Personal details
- Born: January 1, 1848 Manchester, Vermont
- Died: February 23, 1939 (aged 91) Burlington, Vermont
- Resting place: Lakeview Cemetery, Burlington, Vermont
- Party: Republican
- Spouse: Minnie Elizabeth Lyman (m. 1886-1939, his death)
- Education: University of Vermont
- Profession: Attorney

Robert Roberts (January 1, 1848 - February 23, 1939) was an American attorney and politician from Vermont. Among the offices he held, Roberts was twice mayor of Burlington, first from 1899 to 1901, and again from 1911 to 1913.

== Early life ==
Robert Roberts was born in Manchester, Vermont on January 1, 1848, a son of attorney Daniel Roberts and Caroline Diantha (Martindale) Roberts. He attended Burlington High School in Burlington and Manchester's Burr and Burton Seminary, then began attendance at the University of Vermont. While in college, Roberts joined the Delta Psi fraternity and Phi Beta Kappa. After graduating in 1869, Roberts attended Columbia Law School for a year, then continued his studies in French at schools in Paris and Geneva. While studying in Europe, Roberts was a correspondent for several newspapers in the United States.

== Legal career ==
Roberts was admitted to the bar in 1871 and began to practice in Burlington. A Republican, Roberts began a career in politics and government when he was appointed reporter for the Vermont Senate's sessions of 1874, 1878 and 1880.

In 1876 and 1877, Roberts practiced law in Chicago. He then resumed residence in Burlington, where he practiced law in partnership with his father. They maintained the firm of Roberts & Roberts until Daniel Roberts died in 1899, after which Robert Roberts practiced alone.

Roberts was a member of the Merchants National Bank board of directors, the University of Vermont board of trustees, and the board of trustees of the Vermont State Library. Roberts's civic and professional memberships included the Vermont Bar Association, Ethan Allen Club, Algonquin Club, Sons of the American Revolution and Waubanakee Golf Club.

In 1910, he compiled and published the Vermont Digest, a reference work on the decisions of the Vermont Supreme Court. In compiling this work, Roberts revised 60 volumes of decisions that had previously been compiled by his father, and updated it to 82 volumes.

== Political career ==
From 1882 to 1884, Roberts represented Burlington in the Vermont House of Representatives. While in the House, Roberts was a member of the judiciary committee and chairman of the committee on revised bills. From 1887 to 1889, he was Burlington's city attorney.

From 1890 to 1892, Roberts represented Chittenden County in the Vermont Senate. During his Senate term, Roberts was chairman of the judiciary committee.

In 1899 and 1900, Roberts won election as mayor of Burlington, and he served from April 1899 to April 1901. In 1911, he was again elected mayor, and he served until 1913.

== Death and burial ==
Roberts died at his home in Burlington on February 23, 1939. For several years before his death, Roberts was the University of Vermont's oldest living graduate. Roberts's funeral took place at the Congregational church on College Street, and honorary pallbearers included Guy W. Bailey, Harland B. Howe, James Edmund Burke, Clarence H. Beecher, and John Holmes Jackson. Roberts was buried at Lakeview Cemetery in Burlington.

== Family ==
Roberts married Minnie Elizabeth Lyman on October 20, 1886. The couple had no children.

== Works cited ==
=== Books ===
- Carleton, Hiram (1903). Genealogical and Family History of the State of Vermont: A Record of the Achievements of Her People in the Making of a Commonwealth and the Founding of a Nation. Lewis Publishing Company.
- Dodge, Prentiss Cutler (1912). Encyclopedia of Vermont Biography. Burlington, VT: Ullery Publishing Company. pp. 301-302 – via Internet Archive.

=== Newspapers ===
- "Robert Roberts, Former Mayor, Dies at 91". Burlington Free Press. Burlington, VT. February 23, 1939. p. 15 – via Newspapers.com.
- "City and U.V.M. Pay Final Tribute to Robert Roberts". Burlington Free Press. Burlington, VT. February 27, 1939. p. 7 – via Newspapers.com.
