= Joseph D. Hatch =

Mayor of Burlington, Vermont

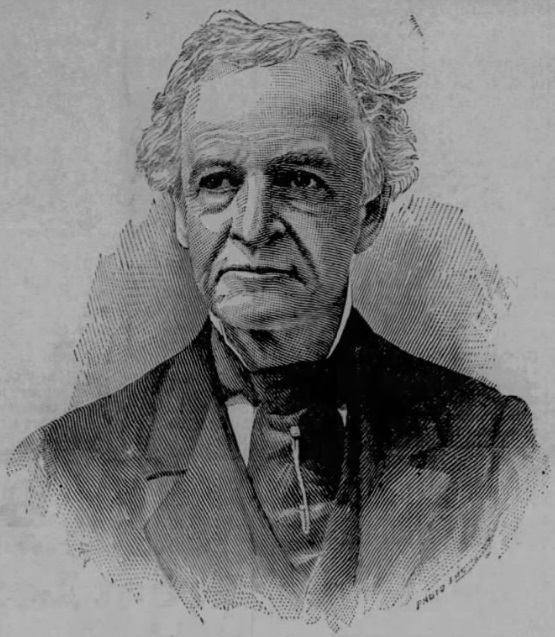
- Burlington Clipper, July 9, 1885

Mayor of Burlington, Vermont
- In office 1876–1883
- Preceded by: Calvin H. Blodgett
- Succeeded by: George H. Morse

Member of the Vermont Senate from Windsor County
- In office 1857–1859 Serving with Charles S. Raymond, Warren C. French, John Wilder
- Preceded by: George Johnson, Shubael Converse, Augustus P. Hunton
- Succeeded by: Warren C. French, John Wilder, Daniel Needham, Joshua M. Aldrich

Member of the Vermont House of Representatives from Windsor
- In office 1853–1855
- Preceded by: Hiram Harlow
- Succeeded by: Jason Steele

Personal details
- Born: January 21, 1811 Norwich, Vermont
- Died: May 21, 1898 (aged 87) Burlington, Vermont
- Party: Whig (before 1855); Republican (from 1855)
- Spouse: Frances Spooner Forbes (M. 1832-1883, her death)
- Children: 4
- Relatives: Daniel Chipman Linsley (son-in-law)
- Education: Dartmouth College
- Profession: Businessman

Joseph D. Hatch (January 21, 1811 - May 21, 1898) was a Vermont politician and businessman. He was most notable for terms in the Vermont House of Representatives and Vermont Senate, and for serving as mayor of Burlington from 1876 to 1883.

== Early life ==
Joseph Denison Hatch (frequently abbreviated as Jo. D. Hatch and J. D. Hatch) was born in Norwich, Vermont on January 21, 1811, a son of Reuben and Eunice (Denison) Hatch. He attended the schools of Norwich and was a student at Norwich University from 1823 to 1826. He then began attendance at Dartmouth College, from which he received his Bachelor of Arts degree in 1830.

After finishing his college studies, Hatch settled in Windsor, Vermont, where he operated a successful general store in partnership with his brother Albert. After Albert Hatch's 1859 death, Joseph Hatch operated the store as the sole partner until he moved to Burlington. He was active in politics as a Whig and later as a Republican, and represented Windsor in the Vermont House of Representatives from 1853 to 1855 and Windsor County in the Vermont Senate from 1857 to 1859.

== Later career ==
In 1861, Hatch moved to Burlington, where he became an investor in the Central Vermont Railway and the Vermont and Canada Railroad. He also became active in Burlington's government, serving on the board of aldermen from 1870 to 1876. Hatch served as mayor from 1876 to 1883, and frequently ran for reelection with the endorsement of both Republicans and Democrats. As the city's chief executive, Hatch received credit for reductions in the city tax rate and its bonded debt. In addition, he was credited with the creation of a sinking fund, which the city used to finance future projects, enabling it to avoid incurring additional debt.

== Death and burial ==
Hatch died in Burlington on May 21, 1898. His funeral took place at Burlington's Cathedral Church of St. Paul. Attendees included Edward Curtis Smith, Farrand Stewart Stranahan, and Urban A. Woodbury. Hatch was buried at Lakeview Cemetery in Burlington.

== Family ==
In, 1832, Hatch married Frances Spooner Forbes (1812-1883) of Windsor. They were the parents of four children. Frances Elizabeth (1833-1860) was the wife of Isaac Green. Pattie (1839-1923) was the wife of Daniel Chipman Linsley. William was born and died in 1846. Josephine (1847-1936) married Rodney S. Wires.

== Sources ==
=== Books ===
- Carleton, Hiram (1903). Genealogical and Family History of the State of Vermont. Vol. I. New York, NY: Lewis Publishing Company. pp. 305–306. ISBN 9780806347943 – via Google Books.
- Ellis, William Arba (1911). Norwich University, 1819-1911: Her History, Her Graduates, Her Roll of Honor. Vol. 2. Montpelier, VT: Capital City Press. pp. 131–132 – via Internet Archive.

=== Newspapers ===
- "Death of Jo. D. Hatch". St. Albans Messenger. St. Albans, VT. May 21, 1898. p. 5 – via Newspapers.com.
- "Hon. Jo. D. Hatch Dead". Northfield News. Northfield, VT. May 24, 1898. p. 3 – via Newspapers.com.
- "Funeral of Ex-Mayor Hatch". Burlington Free Press. Burlington, VT. May 24, 1898. p. 6 – via Newspapers.com.
