= George H. Morse =

Mayor of Burlington, Vermont

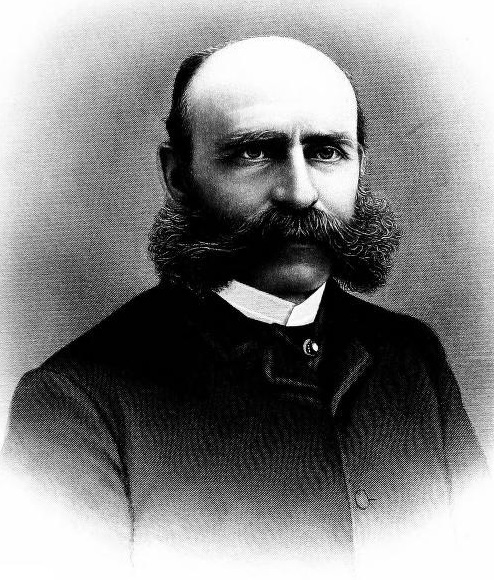
- From 1886's History of Chittenden County, Vermont

Mayor of Burlington, Vermont
- In office April 2, 1883 – April 6, 1885
- Preceded by: Joseph D. Hatch
- Succeeded by: Urban A. Woodbury

Personal details
- Born: January 3, 1839; Boston, Massachusetts, US
- Died: March 4, 1905 (aged 66); Manhattan, New York, US
- Resting place: Lakeview Cemetery, Burlington, Vermont
- Political party: Republican
- Spouse: Kate Russell (m. 1867-1890, her death)
- Children: 2
- Profession: Lumber dealer

George H. Morse (January 3, 1839 – March 4, 1905) was businessman and local government official in Burlington, Vermont. A Republican, he served as mayor of Burlington from 1883 to 1885.

== Early life ==
George Henry Morse was born in Boston, Massachusetts on January 3, 1839, a son of Aaron Morse Jr. and Eliza (Bradley) Morse. He was educated in the public schools of Boston and the academy in Northfield, Massachusetts, from which he graduated in 1859.

== Business career ==
After graduating, Morse was hired at Flint & Hall, a Boston lumber dealer. He spent three years with the company, during which he received training in all facets of the lumber business. In 1862, Morse moved to San Francisco, where he was employed by Pope & Talbot, then the largest lumber company on the Pacific coast. He returned to Flint & Hall in 1866, and in 1867 he moved to Burlington to serve as Flint & Hall's agent in the sale of a Vermont subsidiary. Morse successfully concluded the sale to Otis Shepard & Co. and decided to remain in Burlington.

In 1868, Otis Shepard & Co. joined with Lawrence Barnes & Co. in a new company that included Morse as a partner. Morse and William A. Crombie (who served as Burlington's mayor from 1889 to 1891) became the managing partners of the new corporation, Shepard & Morse. Shepard & Morse grew to include branches in Boston and in Ottawa, Canada. Morse also served on the board of directors for several other companies, including Saginaw Lumber and Salt, American Milk Sugar, Vermont Life Insurance, and Vermont Shade Roller.

== Political career ==
A Republican, Morse served in local offices including member of Burlington's board of fire commissioners. In 1879 he was elected to a one-year term representing Ward 4 on Burlington's board of aldermen. In 1881 he was again elected as an alderman and he served until resigning in February 1882, shortly before the end of his one-year term.

In March 1883, Morse was the successful Republican nominee for a one-year term as mayor, defeating Democratic nominee Charles J. Alger 873 votes (57.7%) to 640 (42.3%). In March 1884, he was reelected without opposition, and received 1144 votes (99.6%) to four blank and write-in ballots. He served from April 1883 to April 1885.

== Later life ==
In 1893, Morse relocated to New York City, where he was a partner in another lumber business, W. M. Crombie & Company. He died in Manhattan on March 4, 1905. Morse was buried at Lakeview Cemetery in Burlington.

== Family ==
In 1867, Morse married Kate Russell (1843-1890) of New Bedford, Massachusetts. They were the parents of two children, Harold Russell (1872-1965), who was sales manager of the A. C. Crombie Lumber Company of New York City, and Herbert William (1876-1948), a vice president of the New York Trust Company.

== Sources ==
=== Books ===
- Rann, William S. (1886). History of Chittenden County, Vermont. Syracuse, NY: D. Mason & Co. pp. 815–816 – via Internet Archive.

=== Newspapers.com ===
- "The Government of Burlington". Burlington Free Press. Burlington, VT. April 8, 1879. p. 3 – via Newspapers.com.
- "City of Burlington: Election Notice". Burlington Clipper. Burlington, VT. March 10, 1881. p. 3 – via Newspapers.com.
- "Resignation: George H. Morse". Burlington Free Press. Burlington, VT. February 7, 1882. p. 3 – via Newspapers.com.
- "Presentation: Ethan Allen Engine Company". Burlington Free Press. Burlington, VT. April 9, 1880. p. 3 – via Newspapers.com.
- "City Election: Vote for Mayor". Burlington Free Press. Burlington, VT. February 24, 1883. p. 1 – via Newspapers.com.
- "Death Notice, George H. Morse". New-York Tribune. New York, NY. March 6, 1905. p. 7 – via Newspapers.com.
- "Died: George Henry Morse". Burlington Free Press. Burlington, Vt. March 7, 1905. p. 7 – via Newspapers.com.
- "Obituary, Herbert W. Morse". Burlington Free Press. Burlington, VT. May 2, 1949. p. 14 – via Newspapers.com.
- "Obituary, Harold R. Morse". Burlington Free Press. Burlington, VT. June 10, 1965. p. 19 – via Newspapers.com.
