= Louis F. Dow =

Mayor of Burlington, Vermont

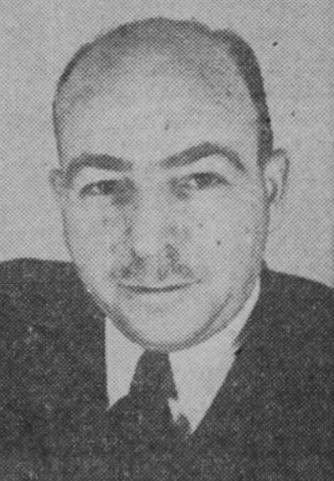
- Burlington Free Press and Times (April 1, 1935)

28th Mayor of Burlington, Vermont
- In office April 1935 – April 1939
- Preceded by: James Edmund Burke
- Succeeded by: John J. Burns

President of the Burlington, Vermont Board of Aldermen
- In office April 1934 – April 1935
- Preceded by: Roswell J. Bromley
- Succeeded by: Hugh L. Finnegan
- In office April 1933 – December 1933
- Preceded by: F. W. Shepardson
- Succeeded by: Roswell J. Bromley

Member of the Burlington, Vermont Board of Aldermen from Ward 6
- In office April 1934 – April 1935
- Preceded by: Ethan V. Howard
- Succeeded by: William H. Wilson

Member of the Burlington, Vermont Board of Aldermen from Ward 5
- In office April 1932 – December 1933
- Preceded by: Harry C. Wheelock
- Succeeded by: Ray D. Crane

Personal details
- Born: September 18, 1892 Burlington, Vermont, U.S.
- Died: February 18, 1964 (aged 71) Burlington, Vermont
- Resting place: Lakeview Cemetery, Burlington, Vermont
- Party: Republican
- Spouse: Georgina Macaulay (m. 1922-1964, his death)
- Children: 1
- Education: University of Vermont
- Occupation: Newspaper reporter and editor Public relations and advertising executive Financial services industry executive

Military service
- Allegiance: United States
- Branch/service: United States Navy
- Years of service: 1918
- Rank: Cadet Flight Officer
- Unit: Citizens' Military Training Camp, Camp Devens, Massachusetts; United States Navy Training Detachment, Massachusetts Institute of Technology
- Battles/wars: World War I

Louis F. Dow (September 18, 1892 - February 18, 1964) was an American businessman and politician from Burlington, Vermont. A Republican, he was most notable for his service as the mayor of Burlington from 1935 to 1939. He is the most recent Republican to serve as mayor of Burlington for more than one term.

== Early life ==
Louis Fenner Dow was born in Burlington, Vermont on September 18, 1892, the son of Gilbert and Mary (Root) Dow. He attended the schools of Burlington and was a 1910 graduate of Burlington High School. In 1915, he graduated from the University of Vermont with a Bachelor of Science degree in commerce and economics. While in college, Dow joined the Sigma Phi fraternity, in which he maintained a lifelong interest.

== Start of career ==
After graduating from college, Dow joined the staff of The Burlington Free Press as a reporter. He subsequently joined the Burlington Daily News as assistant managing editor.

In the summer of 1918, Dow attended the Citizens' Military Training Camp held at Camp Devens, Massachusetts. In the fall of 1918, he held the rank of cadet flight officer and received training in aviation at the Massachusetts Institute of Technology's United States Navy training detachment.

Dow was discharged after the Armistice ended the war in November 1918 and subsequently returned to the Burlington Daily News as the paper's city editor. In addition, he acquired his initial political experience as secretary of the Burlington Republican Committee's 1921 mayoral nominating convention. Dow was long interested in University of Vermont alumni activities, and in 1922 he became editor of the alumni association's weekly newspaper.

During his college years, Dow was captain of the school tennis team. As an adult, he maintained an interest in sports including golf and tennis, participated in numerous tournaments, and won several amateur championships. Dow was also active in social and charitable organizations, including the Ethan Allen Club and the advisory board of the Burlington-area Salvation Army. He was also an active member of Burlington's Episcopal Cathedral Church of St. Paul.

== Continued career ==
Dow later left the newspaper business for a career in public relations and advertising and was president of his own agency, Dow-Peterson, Inc. In 1932 he was a successful Republican candidate to represent Burlington's Ward Five on the board of aldermen. In early 1933, Dow was elected president of the board of aldermen. In late 1933, he lost his aldermanic seat when his family moved into a new home he had constructed, which was outside Ward 5.

In February 1934, Dow announced his candidacy as a Republican for alderman from Ward 6. In March, he was elected to a two-year term. In April, he was again elected as president of the board of aldermen.

== Mayor of Burlington ==
In January 1935, Dow announced his candidacy for the Republican nomination for mayor of Burlington. In February, Dow won the nomination at the Burlington Republican Party's caucus with 589 votes, defeating fellow aldermen C. F. Robinson (208) and R. J. Bromley (132), who moved to make the nomination unanimous.

In March, Dow defeated incumbent mayor James Edmund Burke by 222 votes, 3,143 to 2,921 and took office for a two-year term. In 1937, Dow was the Republican nominee for mayor and was re-elected by defeating Burke, 3,617 to 2,177.

In February 1939, Dow was nominated by the Republican Party for a third term as mayor. In March, he was defeated for re-election by the Democratic nominee, John J. Burns, 2,882-2,685.

== Later career ==
Dow continued his career in public relations and advertising. During World War II, he was head of public relations for Bell Aircraft. Dow was later active in the financial services industry, and served as vice president of Edward E. Mathews, a Boston-based mutual funds specialist. He subsequently served as head of the mutual funds department for A. M. Kidder and Co. in Burlington.

Dow died in Burlington on February 18, 1964. He was buried at Lakeview Cemetery in Burlington.

== Family ==
In 1922, Dow married Georgina Macaulay (1898-1987), a native of Canada. They were married until his death and were the parents of a son, Louis Jr.
