= Albert L. Catlin =

American politician

1st Mayor of Burlington
- In office 1865–1866
- Preceded by: Office established
- Succeeded by: Torrey E. Wales

Personal details
- Born: Albert Leonard Catlin c. 1809 Addison County, Vermont, U.S.
- Died: August 10, 1884 (aged 75) Burlington, Vermont, U.S.
- Party: Republican
- Other political affiliations: Whig; National Union
- Spouse: Olivia Mason

Albert L. Catlin (c.1809 – August 10, 1884) was an American politician who served as the first Mayor of Burlington, Vermont. Catlin was born in Addison County, Vermont around 1809 and died in Burlington in 1884.

== Career ==
Catlin served as the federal tariff collector for the port of Burlington from 1849 to 1853. Later in the 1850s he became a director and a member of the board of finance for the National Life Insurance Company of Montpelier, Vermont. He was elected as director and president of the Rutland Railroad in 1863.

Catlin represented Orwell, Vermont, in the Vermont House of Representatives from 1847 to 1848. He was one of six Whig presidential electors for the state of Vermont, as the 3rd district elector, during the 1848 presidential campaign and cast his vote for Zachary Taylor when the electoral college met. During the 1864 presidential campaign he supported the National Union ticket and was the one of two at-large presidential electors along with three other district electors and went on to cast his vote for Abraham Lincoln.

=== Mayor ===
On February 20, 1865, Catlin defeated Carolus Noyes for the mayoralty of Burlington in its first election with 413 votes to Noyes' 249 and won both wards and would serve one one-year term. In his mayoral address in 1866, he referred to Burlington as the "Queen City of New England", which it had been called as far back as 1848, leading to the popularization of the nickname.

Luman A. Drew was appointed as the city's first constable on June 7, 1865, and the police made 248 arrests that year, with 90% being liquor-related. Drew was later appointed chief of police in 1868.

== Later life ==
In 1866, Catlin nominated state representative John L. Barstow for the Republican nomination for state senate and was approved unanimously.

In 1878, he was one of the charterers of a corporation with the purpose to hold real estate for the Bishop of the Episcopal Church in the Diocese of Vermont.

== Works cited ==
- "Guy Catlin Papers". University of Vermont. Archived from the original on August 4, 2024.
- Beerworth, Jeffrey (2015). Historic Crimes and Justice in Burlington, Vermont. The History Press. ISBN 9781467118408.
