= Luther C. Dodge =

Mayor of Burlington, Vermont

Mayor of Burlington, Vermont
- In office 1871–1874
- Preceded by: Torrey E. Wales
- Succeeded by: Calvin H. Blodgett

Personal details
- Born: September 7, 1821 Montpelier, Vermont
- Died: February 3, 1901 (aged 79) San Rafael, California
- Resting place: Mount Tamalpais Cemetery, San Rafael, California
- Party: Republican
- Spouse: Lucia Pomeroy Moore (m. 1849-1901, his death)
- Children: 1
- Profession: Businessman

Luther C. Dodge (September 7, 1821 – February 3, 1901) was a businessman, politician, and government official who was active in Vermont and California. A Republican, he was most notable for serving as mayor of Burlington, Vermont from 1871 to 1874.

== Biography ==
Luther Collamer Dodge was born in Montpelier, Vermont on September 7, 1821, a son of Nathan and Hannah (Phinney) Dodge. He was educated in Montpelier and farmed until 1841, when he moved to Burlington, Vermont to become a clerk in the J. & J. H. Peck Company wholesale mercantile business. In 1847 he joined the Troy and Canada Junction Telegraph Company as an operator. In 1848, Dodge became the company's superintendent, a position he held until 1853.

In September 1855, Dodge moved to San Francisco, California, where he was a partner with his brother Henry L. Dodge and others in a wholesale mercantile business. He later operated a wholesale business in Petaluma, California in partnership with William Hill. In 1868, Dodge returned to Burlington, where he resided until 1877. Dodge's brother Omri was president of Burlington's First National Bank, and Luther Dodge served as the bank's cashier. In addition to his banking career, Dodge was involved with several Burlington civic causes, including serving as an officer of the Young Men's Association, a captain in a volunteer fire company, and a member of the city's Board of Trade. A Republican, he was elected mayor in 1871, and served until 1874. Among the highlights of Dodge's term was presiding over the dedication of a statue of Ethan Allen, which was placed at Burlington's Greenmount Cemetery in July 1873.

In April 1877, Dodge returned to San Francisco, where he was a partner with E. W. Forsaith in the Forsaith & Dodge wholesale mercantile business. Dodge sold his share of the business in 1882 and moved to Idaho, where he was a partner with his brothers Omri and Nathan in a lumber business that manufactured sashes, doors, and other building materials. In 1883 the lumber mill, factory, and a large stock of raw lumber, glass, and finished wood products were destroyed by fire.

Dodge returned to San Francisco after losing his Idaho lumber business. Between 1884 and 1890, he was employed by several businesses, including superintendent of the Coos Bay Stave and Lumber Company and superintendent of Pacific Woodenware and Cooperage. In March 1890, Dodge was appointed cashier in the office of the U.S. Internal Revenue Collector for San Francisco, a position he held until the late 1890s. In retirement, he resided with his son in San Rafael, California.

Dodge died at the San Rafael home of his son George on February 3, 1901. He was buried at Mount Tamalpais Cemetery in San Rafael.

== Family ==
In 1849, Dodge married Lucia Pomeroy Moore (1825-1903) of Burlington. They were the parents of a son, George Moore Dodge. George Dodge (1850-1925) was a graduate of the University of Vermont who became a well-known railroad construction engineer and surveyor in California.

== Sources ==
=== Books ===
- Ullery, Jacob G. (1894). Men of Vermont Illustrated. Brattleboro, VT: Transcript Publishing Company. pp. 51–52 – via Internet Archive.

=== Newspapers ===
- "Young Men's Association Annual Meeting". Burlington Free Press. Burlington, VT. November 10, 1869. p. 3 – via Newspapers.com.
- "Bank Elections". Burlington Free Press. Burlington, VT. January 12, 1870. p. 3 – via Newspapers.com.
- "Volunteer Engine Company". Burlington Free Press. Burlington, VT. January 19, 1871. p. 3 – via Newspapers.com.
- "Board of Trade Special Meeting". Burlington Free Press. Burlington, VT. January 15, 1872. p. 3 – via Newspapers.com.
- "The Ethan Allen Celebration". Rutland Daily Globe. Rutland, VT. July 10, 1873. p. 1 – via Newspapers.com.
- "Personal and Social: George M. Dodge". The Weekly Argus. Petaluma, CA. May 28, 1887. p. 3 – via Newspapers.com.
- "Personal Splashes: Mr. L. C. Dodge". The Daily Surf. Santa Cruz, CA. July 1, 1887. p. 3 – via Newspapers.com.
- "Citizens' League: A Municipal Ticket Nominated for Popular Suffrage". The Daily Examiner. San Francisco, CA. September 27, 1888. p. 6 – via Newspapers.com.
- "A Golden Wedding". Marin Journal. San Rafael, CA. October 5, 1899. p. 11 – via California Digital Newspaper Collection.
- "Death of Luther C. Dodge". Burlington Free Press. Burlington, VT. February 5, 1901. p. 6 – via Newspapers.com.
- "Death Notice, Luther C. Dodge". Marin Journal. San Rafael, CA. February 7, 1901. p. 6 – via California Digital Newspaper Collection.
- "Death Notice, Lucia Moore Dodge". Burlington Free Press. Burlington, VT. January 6, 1903. p. 5 – via Newspapers.com.
- "Obituary, George M. Dodge". Burlington Free Press. Burlington, VT. July 3, 1925. p. 7 – via Newspapers.com.

=== Internet ===
- "California Voter Registers, 1866-1898: San Francisco, 6th Ward, 1880". Ancestry.com. Lehi, UT: Ancestry.com LLC.
