= 1908 Vermont gubernatorial election =

- September 1, 1908
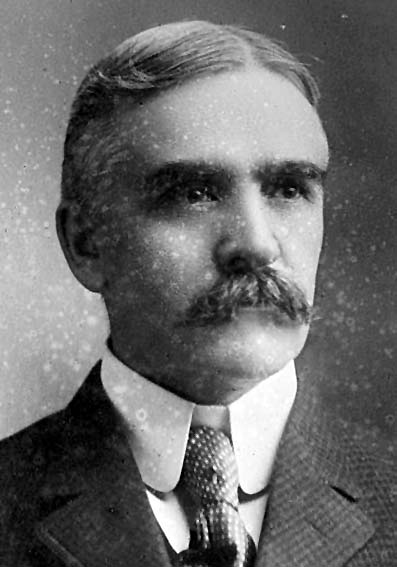

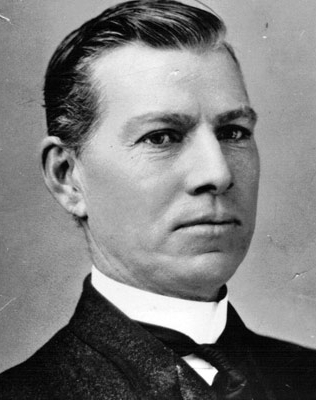
Nominee	George H. Prouty	James Edmund Burke
Party	Republican	Democratic
Popular vote	45,598	15,953
Percentage	70.83%	24.78%
- Prouty: 40–50% 50–60% 60–70% 70–80% 80–90% 90-100% Burke: 50–60% 60–70% 70–80% Tie: 50% No Vote/Data
Governor before election
Fletcher D. Proctor
Republican
Elected Governor
George H. Prouty
Republican

The 1908 Vermont gubernatorial election took place on September 1, 1908. Incumbent Republican Fletcher D. Proctor, per the "Mountain Rule", did not run for re-election to a second term as Governor of Vermont. Republican candidate George H. Prouty defeated Democratic candidate, Burlington mayor James Edmund Burke to succeed him.

== Results ==
1908 Vermont gubernatorial election
Party	Candidate	Votes	%	±%
Republican	George H. Prouty	45,598	70.83	+10.7
Democratic	James Edmund Burke	15,953	24.78	+24.8
Independent	Quimby S. Backus	1,351	2.10	+2.1
Prohibition	Eugene M. Campbell	918	1.42	+0.4
Socialist	J. H. Dunbar	547	0.85	−0.1
N/A	Other	12	0.02	
Total votes		64,379	100.0	
