= William J. Van Patten =

American politician (1848–1920)

William James Van Patten
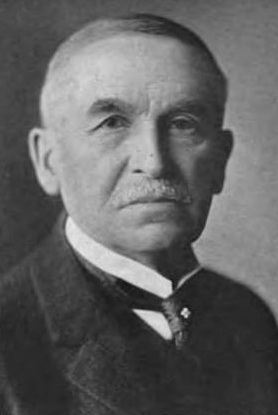
- Born: September 9, 1848; Wauwatosa, Wisconsin
- Died: February 13, 1920 (aged 71); New York City
- Burial place: Lakeview Cemetery
- Political party: Republican

William J. Van Patten (September 9, 1848 – February 13, 1920) was a Vermont businessman, philanthropist, and politician who served as President of the Vermont State Senate.

== Biography ==
William James Van Patten was born on September 9, 1848, in Wauwatosa, Wisconsin, to William Henry Van Patten and Mary Vanderpool. One or two years after his birth his father died and his mother took William to Vermont, where he was raised in Bristol and Middlebury. He moved to Burlington, Vermont, in 1864 and worked for A.C. Spear's drug store for four years. He joined the drug firm Henry & Company, which later became the Wells & Richardson Company, and became a partner in 1872, and secretary in 1883.

Van Patten became an expert in aniline dyes, which had been discovered in England in the mid-1800s. His success at creating and finding household uses for these compounds made Wells, Richardson one of the country's leading producers of them, and Van Patten became wealthy as a result.

Van Patten was president of the Champlain Manufacturing Company, which produced blinds, doors and sashes. He was also president of Burlington's Malted Cereals Company and the Burlington Building and Loan Association, as well as a director of the Queen City Cotton Company.

He was also active in the YMCA and served as its national president from 1882 to 1889. In addition, Van Patten was president of the Mary Fletcher Hospital, and a trustee of the Fletcher Free Library.

A Republican, Van Patten served as Mayor of Burlington from 1894 to 1895. During his term, the city created its first paid fire department and its first paved streets. Van Patten also spent extensively of his personal funds to beautify the city, including projects such as planting trees and shrubs in rights of way, and the creation of Ethan Allen Park.

He remained active in city affairs after leaving the mayor's office, serving on the board of cemetery commissioners from 1898 to 1911, and the board of park commissioners from 1903 to 1911.

Interested in history and genealogy, Van Patten was also a member of the Society of Colonial Wars and the Sons of the American Revolution.

Van Patten was elected to the Vermont Senate in 1906. He served one term, and was chosen to serve as Senate President.

== Personal life ==
Van Patten married Harriet P. Lemon in 1874, with whom he had four children. He was a Congregationalist. He died in New York City on February 13, 1920. He was buried in Burlington's Lakeview Cemetery.

== Works cited ==
- Carleton, Hiram (1903). Genealogical and Family History of the State of Vermont: A Record of the Achievements of Her People in the Making of a Commonwealth and the Founding of a Nation. Lewis Publishing Company.

Political offices
Preceded by George H. Prouty	President pro tempore of the Vermont State Senate; 1906–1907	Succeeded by Ernest W. Gibson, Sr.
Preceded by Seneca Haselton	Mayor of Burlington, Vermont; 1894–1895	Succeeded by Hamilton S. Peck
