= Lakeview Cemetery (Burlington, Vermont) =

Cemetery in Vermont

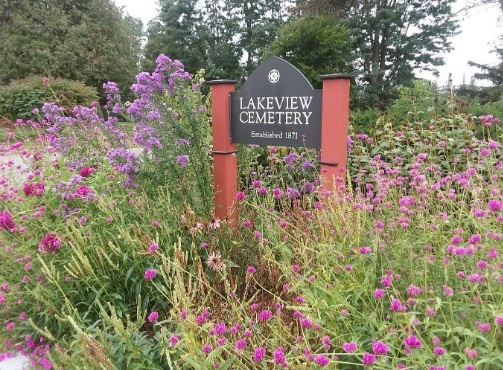
- Main entrance to Lakeview Cemetery off Burlington, Vermont's North Avenue.
- Interactive map of Lakeview Cemetery

Details
- Established: 1867
- Location: North Avenue, Burlington, Vermont
- Coordinates: 44°29′33″N 73°13′56″W
- Type: Non-denominational cemetery
- Find a Grave: Lakeview Cemetery

Lakeview Cemetery is a historic rural cemetery located off of North Avenue in Burlington, Chittenden County, Vermont. The cemetery was created in 1867 and dedicated in 1871, and overlooks Lake Champlain. It is near the current campus of Burlington High School.

== Details ==
Lakeview Cemetery is a non-denominational cemetery owned by the city of Burlington. The cemetery's Louisa Howard Chapel is available for rent, and is frequently used for marriage ceremonies, funerals, memorial services, music recitals, and other functions. The city government's management of the cemetery is aided by the Friends of Lakeview Cemetery, a group formed in the early 1990s to plan improvements to the cemetery buildings and grounds and raise money to carry them out.

== History ==
Lakeview Cemetery was established in 1867 when the city of Burlington purchased 23 acres of land from H. B. Sawyer for $3,500 (about $65,000 in 2019). In 1868, the city purchased an additional seven acres from J. A. Arthur for $2,000 (about $38,000 in 2019).

The cemetery was planned in the rural cemetery style that became popular in the mid-1800s. Located at what was then the outskirts of the city and situated near the end of the city's trolley car line, Lakeview included many of the attributes of a park. Its narrow, meandering roads, benches, and specimen trees helped make it an outdoor destination for city dwellers, who visited for picnics and other activities.

In the 1880s, philanthropist Louisa Howard financed the construction of a small church on the cemetery grounds. When the stone Victorian Gothic Revival building was dedicated in 1882, it was named in her honor. The Louisa Howard Chapel fell into disuse during the 1940s, but in the 1990s a group of interested individuals formed Friends of Lakeview Cemetery, which raised funds to refurbish it. By 2004, the group had raised $100,000, and the chapel underwent a restoration that was completed in 2006. Other improvements and restorations undertaken by Friends of Lakeview Cemetery include construction of a new gazebo in 2010 to replace an original that had fallen into disrepair. The new cedar wood gazebo was crafted by hand in the 19th-century Adirondack Architecture style so that it resembled the original.

Lakeview's grounds included three fountains that were donated in the 1870s by John P. Howard (Louisa Howard's brother). In 2014, Friends of Lakeview Cemetery completed restoration of the fountains, using the remnants of the originals and a photo from a vintage postcard for reference.

== Interments ==
Burials at Lakeview Cemetery include veterans of every major conflict since the American Civil War, including several members of the 54th Massachusetts Infantry Regiment, a Union Army regiment of African American soldiers and white officers. Several soldiers who served at nearby Fort Ethan Allen in the late 1800s and early 1900s are buried at Lakeview, including members of the famed 10th Cavalry Regiment (Buffalo Soldiers).

== Notable burials ==
Many notable political and military leaders and other prominent individuals are interred at Lakeview Cemetery, to include:

- Harold J. Arthur, Vermont governor
- Warren Austin, US Senator and first US ambassador to the United Nations
- Milo Lyman Bennett, associate justice of the Vermont Supreme Court
- Rufus E. Brown, attorney general of Vermont
- Chauncey W. Brownell, Vermont secretary of state
- Lucius E. Chittenden, author and public official
- George E. Davis, recipient of the Medal of Honor during the American Civil War
- Louis F. Dow, mayor of Burlington
- Albert S. Drew, mayor of Burlington
- David J. Foster, US Congressman
- George P. Foster, Union Army officer during the American Civil War who attained the rank of brigadier general by brevet
- Aaron H. Grout, Vermont secretary of state
- Seneca Haselton, associate justice of the Vermont Supreme Court
- Joseph D. Hatch, state legislator and mayor of Burlington
- Donly C. Hawley, mayor of Burlington
- Doc Hazelton, major league baseball player and college baseball coach
- William W. Henry, Union Army officer in the American Civil War who attained the rank of brevet brigadier general and received the Medal of Honor
- Oliver Otis Howard, US Army major general who received the Medal of Honor for heroism while serving in the Union Army during the American Civil War
- Hollister Jackson, lieutenant governor of Vermont
- Horatio Nelson Jackson, first person to completely cross the United States by automobile
- John Holmes Jackson, mayor of Burlington
- Job Lyman, Vermont Auditor of Accounts
- Henry T. Mayo, US Navy admiral who commanded the Atlantic Fleet during World War I
- George H. Morse, mayor of Burlington
- Hamilton S. Peck, state legislator and judge, mayor of Burlington
- Theodora Agnes Peck, novelist and poet
- Theodore S. Peck, Union Army officer who received the Medal of Honor for American Civil War heroism
- William S. Peirce, United States Army brigadier general
- E. Henry Powell, Vermont Auditor of Accounts
- Max L. Powell, President pro tempore of the Vermont State Senate
- Daniel Roberts, attorney
- Robert Roberts, mayor of Burlington
- George J. Stannard, Union Army major general whose brigade was credited with breaking Pickett's Charge at the Battle of Gettysburg
- Elliot M. Sutton, mayor of Burlington
- William J. Van Patten, businessman, philanthropist, Burlington mayor, and President pro tempore of the Vermont Senate
- William Wells, Union Army major general by brevet who received the Medal of Honor for heroism at the Battle of Gettysburg
- Urban A. Woodbury, governor of Vermont

== Sources ==
=== Newspapers ===
- "The Late Edward Lyman". Burlington Free Press. Burlington, VT. May 26, 1890. p. 5 – via Newspapers.com.
- "Funeral of Ex-Mayor Hatch". Burlington Free Press. Burlington, VT. May 24, 1898. p. 6 – via Newspapers.com.
- "Danl. Roberts Dead". Middlebury Register. Middlebury, VT. October 13, 1899. p. 7 – via Newspapers.com.
- "Death Notice, Lucius E. Chittenden". Burlington Free Press. Burlington, VT. July 24, 1900. p. 5 – via Newspapers.com.
- "Died: George Henry Morse". Burlington Free Press. Burlington, Vt. March 7, 1905. p. 7 – via Newspapers.com.
- "The Late E. M. Sutton". Burlington Daily News. Burlington, VT. March 9, 1908. p. 6 – via Newspapers.com.
- "Funerals Saturday, Yesterday and To-Day". Burlington Free Press. Burlington, VT. May 8, 1911. p. 8 – via Newspapers.com.
- "City and U.V.M. Pay Final Tribute to Robert Roberts". Burlington Free Press. Burlington, VT. February 27, 1939. p. 7 – via Newspapers.com.
- "Funerals: William J. Van Patten". Burlington Free Press. Burlington, VT. February 17, 1920. p. 3 – via Newspapers.com.
- "Funerals, Yesterday, Today and Tomorrow". Burlington Free Press. Burlington, VT. June 17, 1920. p. 8 – via Newspapers.com.
- "Obituary: Albert S. Drew". The Burlington Free Press. Burlington, VT. November 22, 1920. p. 7 – via Newspapers.com.
- "Many Pay Tribute: State Well Represented at Funeral of Late Judge Haselton". Burlington Free Press. Burlington, VT. July 25, 1921. p. 7. Archived from the original on 9 December 2019 – via Newspapers.com.
- "Funerals Yesterday and Tomorrow". Burlington Free Press. Burlington, Vermont. July 14, 1923. p. 7 – via Newspapers.com.
- "Obituary, Dr. D. C. Hawley". Burlington Free Press. Burlington, VT. January 28, 1926. p. 5 – via Newspapers.com.
- "Funeral of Dr. D. C. Hawley". Burlington Free Press. Burlington, VT. February 2, 1926. p. 8 – via Newspapers.com.
- "Funeral of Judge Peck to be Held Sunday Afternoon". Burlington Free Press. Burlington, VT. October 14, 1933. p. 7 – via Newspapers.com.
- "Funeral Notice, Chauncey W. Brownell". Burlington Free Press and Times. Burlington, VT. February 7, 1938. p. 13 – via Newspapers.com.
- "Max L. Powell's Funeral Services Largely Attended". Burlington Free Press. Burlington, VT. March 5, 1941. p. 7 – via Newspapers.com.
- "W. C. Hazelton Dies at Age of 64". Burlington Free Press. Burlington, VT. March 11, 1941. p. 3 – via Newspapers.com.
- "Dr. J. Holmes Jackson, 73, Dies; Was Mayor of This City 12 Years". The Burlington Free Press. 16 December 1944. p. 9. Archived from the original on 12 May 2019 – via Newspapers.com.
- "Historical Novelist, Miss Peck 81 Dies After Long Illness". Burlington Free Press. Burlington, VT. January 13, 1964. p. 5 – via Newspapers.com.
- "Louis Dow Dies, Was Mayor Here". The Burlington Free Press. Burlington, VT. February 19, 1964. p. 7 – via Newspapers.com.
- "Judge Aaron H. Grout Dies; Long Active in Public Service". December 30, 1966. p. 13. Archived from the original on 9 December 2019 – via Newspapers.com.
- Friends of Lakeview Cemetery (October 2, 2015). "Lakeview Cemetery: More than a burial ground". Burlington Free Press. Burlington, VT.
- "Time Capsule: Hollister Jackson". The Sun. Elizabethtown, NY. September 14, 2018. Archived from the original on December 12, 2019.
- Lightbody, David (November 10, 2018). "Many World War I veterans buried at Burlington's Lakeview Cemetery". Burlington Free Press. Burlington, VT.

=== Internet ===
- Trutor, Barry. "Lakeview Cemetery (VOCA)". VOCA58.org. Burlington, VT: Vermont Old Cemetery Association.
- Conley, Edward B. Burlington (VT) City Clerk (November 2, 1921). "Vermont Vital Records, 1720–1908, Burial Record for Milo L. Bennett". Ancestry.com. Lehi, UT: Ancestry.com LLC.
