= Hamilton S. Peck =

Mayor of Burlington, Vermont

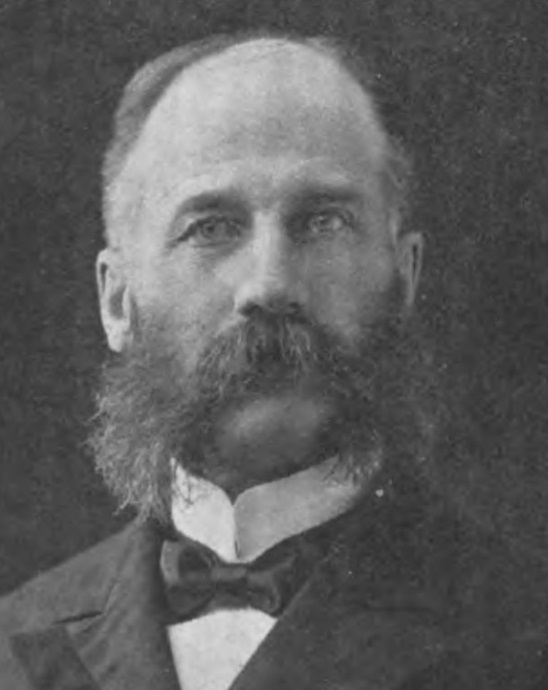
- From the February 1900 issue of The Vermonter magazine

Judge of the Burlington, Vermont Municipal Court
- In office 1929–1933
- Preceded by: Clarence P. Cowles
- Succeeded by: Aaron H. Grout
- In office 1888–1894
- Preceded by: William H. Hare
- Succeeded by: Julius W. Russell

Member of the Vermont House of Representatives from Burlington
- In office 1927–1931
- Preceded by: James Edmund Burke
- Succeeded by: James Edmund Burke
- In office 1910–1912
- Preceded by: Matthew G. Leary
- Succeeded by: Thomas Louis Howley

Member of the Vermont Senate from Chittenden County
- In office 1917–1919 Serving with Donly C. Hawley; Martin S. Vilas; Heman H. Wheeler
- Preceded by: Henry B. Shaw; Max L. Powell; Frank E. Blake; Elon. O. Martin
- Succeeded by: Frank Slater Jackson; Sherman R. Moulton; Henry W. Tracy; Martin S. Vilas

Mayor of Burlington, Vermont
- In office 1896–1898
- Preceded by: William J. Van Patten
- Succeeded by: Elliot M. Sutton

State's Attorney of Chittenden County, Vermont
- In office 1878–1880
- Preceded by: Cornelius S. Palmer
- Succeeded by: Marcellus A. Bingham

Personal details
- Born: October 22, 1845 Royalston, Massachusetts
- Died: October 12, 1933 (aged 87) Burlington, Vermont
- Party: Republican
- Spouse: Selina A. Aiken (M. 1875-1933, his death)
- Children: 1
- Education: University of Vermont
- Profession: Attorney

Military service
- Branch/service: Judge Advocate General's Corps
- Years of service: 1900–1904
- Rank: Brigadier general
- Unit: Vermont National Guard

Hamilton S. Peck (October 22, 1845 – October 12, 1933) was an American attorney and politician from Burlington, Vermont. A Republican, among the offices in which he served were alderman (1883-1885), city court judge (1888-1894), and mayor (1896-1898).

== Early life ==
Hamilton Sullivan Peck was born in Royalston, Massachusetts on Oct. 22, 1845, a son of Sullivan and Czarina (Davis) Peck. He was educated in Royalston, and attended high school in Athol, Massachusetts. He moved to Burlington, Vermont with his family in 1865, and completed his high school education after becoming a resident of Vermont.

In 1866, Peck began attendance at the University of Vermont, from which he graduated with a Bachelor of Arts degree in 1870. While in college, Peck was a member of the Sigma Phi fraternity and was elected to Phi Beta Kappa.

== Career ==
Peck taught school in Burlington for three years while studying law at the firm of Torrey E. Wales and Russell S. Taft, and attained admission to the bar in 1873. He established a practice in Burlington became active in politics as a Republican.

From 1878 to 1880, Peck served as State's Attorney of Chittenden County. He served as an alderman from 1883 to 1885, and was judge of Burlington’s city court from 1888 to 1894. From 1892 to 1896, Peck was secretary of the Vermont Republican State Committee, and he was president of the state Republican League from 1896 to 1898. From 1896 to 1898 he served as mayor of Burlington. In 1900, he was appointed judge advocate general of the Vermont National Guard with the rank of brigadier general and he served until 1904. Peck represented Burlington in the Vermont House of Representatives from 1910 to 1912.

Peck served as Burlington’s city attorney from 1918 to 1918 and 1923 to 1925. From 1917 to 1919 he represented Chittenden County in the Vermont Senate. He served in the Vermont House of Representatives again from 1927 to 1931 From 1929 to 1932, Peck again served as judge of Burlington’s city court.

After settling in Burlington, Peck was long active in civic and philanthropic organizations. In addition to attaining the 33rd Degree of Freemasonry, he was a member of the Shriners. He was also a member of the Independent Order of Odd Fellows, Knights of Pythias, Modern Woodmen of America, Benevolent and Protective Order of Elks, and Ethan Allen Club.

== Death and burial ==
Peck died in Burlington on October 12, 1933. He received Masonic honors at his funeral, which was held in Burlington’s Congregational church. Peck was buried at Lakeview Cemetery in Burlington.

== Family ==
On January 28, 1875, Peck married Selina Atwood Aiken of Hardwick, Vermont. They were the parents of a son, Dr. Roy Hamilton Peck of Springfield, Massachusetts.

== Sources ==
=== Books ===
- Caswell, Lilley Brewer; Cross, Fred Wilder (1917). The History of the Town of Royalston, Massachusetts. Royalston, Massachusetts: Town of Royalston. p. 285 – via Internet Archive.

=== Newspapers ===
- "Gilmore Elected: Hamilton S. Peck, Judge Advocate". St. Albans Messenger. St. Albans, VT. November 13, 1900. p. 1 – via Newspapers.com.
- "Hamilton S. Peck Dies After Short Illness". Burlington Free Press. Burlington, VT. October 13, 1933. p. 10 – via Newspapers.com.
- "Death Notice, Hamilton S. Peck". Burlington Free Press. Burlington, VT. October 13, 1933. p. 6 – via Newspapers.com.
- "Funeral of Judge Peck to be Held Sunday Afternoon". Burlington Free Press. Burlington, VT. October 14, 1933. p. 7 – via Newspapers.com.
