= Donly C. Hawley =

American physician and politician (1855–1926)

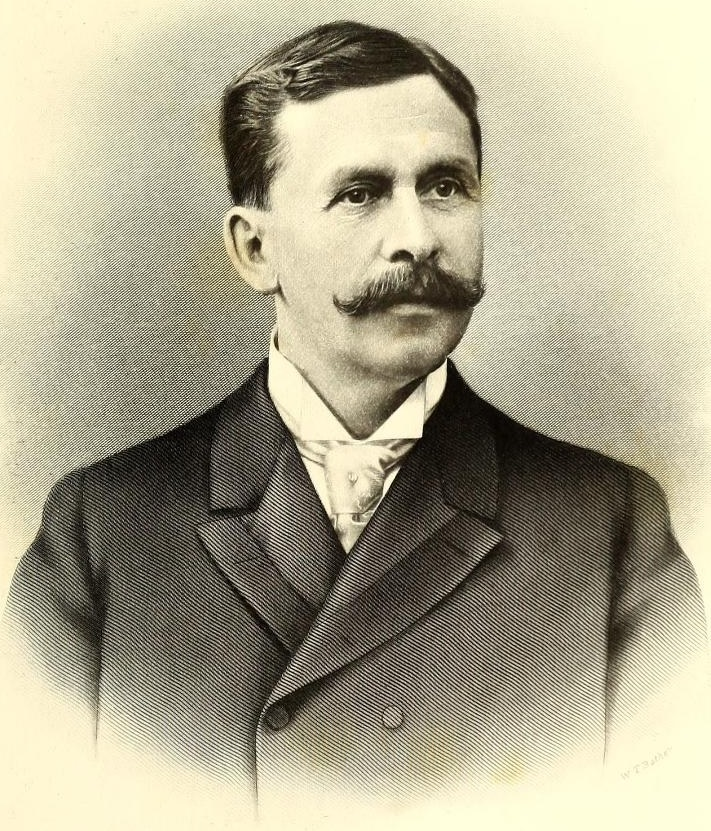
- From 1903's Genealogical and Family History of the State of Vermont

Member of the Vermont Senate from Chittenden County
- In office 1917–1919 Serving with Hamilton S. Peck, Martin S. Vilas, Heman H. Wheeler
- Preceded by: Henry B. Shaw, Max L. Powell, Frank E. Blake, Elon O. Martin
- Succeeded by: Frank Slater Jackson, Sherman R. Moulton, Henry W. Tracy, Martin S. Vilas

Mayor of Burlington, Vermont
- In office 1901–1903
- Preceded by: Robert Roberts
- Succeeded by: James Edmund Burke

Personal details
- Born: October 31, 1855 Fletcher, Vermont
- Died: January 27, 1926 (aged 70) Daytona Beach, Florida
- Resting place: Lakeview Cemetery, Burlington, Vermont
- Party: Republican
- Spouse: Jessie Roberts Hill (m. 1878-1926, his death)
- Children: 2
- Education: University of Vermont (BS, MD)
- Profession: Physician

Donly C. Hawley (October 31, 1855 - January 27, 1926) was an American physician and politician in Burlington, Vermont. A nationally recognized expert in the field of colorectal surgery, he was an attending surgeon at several Burlington-area hospitals and a frequent contributor to numerous medical journals. A Republican, among the offices in which he served was mayor of Burlington (1901-1903) and member of the Vermont Senate (1917-1919).

== Early life ==
Donly Curtis Hawley was born in Fletcher, Vermont on October 31, 1855, a son of Dr. Curtis F. Hawley and Louise Ann (Boynton) Hawley. He was raised and educated in Fletcher and Fairfax. Hawley graduated from Fairfax's New Hampton Institute in 1873 and Barre City, Vermont's Barre Academy in 1874. Hawley then attended the University of Vermont, from which he received his Bachelor of Science degree in 1874.

Hawley worked at his father's Fairfax mercantile business while studying medicine under his father's tutelage. Hawley later studied under Dr. L. M. Bingham. He then returned to the University of Vermont, where he completed his M.D. degree in 1884. Hawley's graduating class included 101 students; he was ranked first, and was selected as the class valedictorian.

== Medical career ==
After becoming a doctor, Hawley worked for several months at an existing medical practice in Brattleboro, Vermont, then returned to Burlington to establish a practice of his own. Hawley became a surgeon specializing in colorectal procedures, and he was an attending physician on the staffs of Mary Fletcher, Bishop DeGoesbriand, and Fanny Allen Hospitals, all of which are now part of the University of Vermont Medical Center. In addition, he lectured on surgical nursing at the Mary Fletcher Hospital's nurse training school. Hawley was also the attending physician at Burlington's Home for Destitute Children.

Hawley was a leader in several professional organizations and societies, including the American Medical Association, American Academy of Medicine, Vermont State Medical Society, Burlington and Chittenden County Clinical Society, and Vermont Society for the Study and Prevention of Tuberculosis. In the 1890s he served on the federal panel that reviewed the qualifications of surgeons appointed to examine pension applications from veterans of the American Civil War.

In addition to his medical society memberships, Hawley was active in St. Paul's Episcopal Church, the Ethan Allen Club, Algonquian Club, Royal Arcanum, Knights of Pythias, Modern Woodmen of America, and Burlington Chamber of Commerce. In addition, he served on the board of directors of the Burlington Mutual Fire Insurance Company.

As Hawley's career progressed, his professional memberships grew to include the American Proctologic Society, American Society for the Study and Prevention of Infant Mortality, and American Public Health Association. He served as a member of the Vermont Tuberculosis Commission from 1907 to 1908, and was also a member of the state board that oversaw the registration of nurses.

Hawley was a prolific author on medical topics including heart disease and colorectal surgery. More than 20 of his works were published, and he presented many of them in person at medical society meetings and professional conferences.

== Political career ==
Hawley was active in politics and government from an early age. A Republican, he served as Fairfax's school superintendent from 1881 to 1882. He was a member of the Burlington School Board from 1893 to 1901, and also served on the city park commission.

In 1901, Hawley was elected mayor of Burlington and he was reelected in 1902. Hawley ran for a third one-year term in 1903. He appeared to win the election by three votes, and was sworn in at the start of the term in April 1903. Populist challenger James Edmund Burke challenged the result in court. The Vermont Supreme Court declared him the winner of a recount in May, and Burke took office on May 30.

In 1916, Hawley was a successful Republican candidate to represent Chittenden County in the Vermont Senate. He served one term, 1917 to 1919. During his term, Hawley was chairman of the Public Health Committee, and served on the Banking and Insurance, Institutions, and Education Committees.

== Death and burial ==
In retirement, Hawley resided in Burlington during the summer and spent winters in Daytona Beach, Florida. He died in Daytona Beach on January 27, 1926. Hawley's funeral was held at St. Paul's Episcopal Church and he was buried at Lakeview Cemetery in Burlington.

== Family ==
In 1878, Hawley married Jessie Roberts Hill (1856-1937). They were the parents of two children, Betty (1882-1942), the wife of Charles R. Wilder of Mount Vernon, New York and May (1887-1958), the wife of James S. Bixby of Poughkeepsie, New York.

== Works by ==
(Partial list)

- "Heart Sounds and Cardiac Murmurs (1892)
- "Surgical Treatment of Hemorrhoids" (1893)
- "The Radical Cure of Hydrocele" (1895)
- "Thoughts on General and Cardiac Therapy" (1896)
- "Osteosarcoma of Femur — Wyeth's Bloodless Amputation at Hip Joint, with Recovery" (1896)
- "Diseases of the Rectum," (1897)
- "The Surgical Cure of Hydrocele" (1899)
- "Inflammation and Ulceration of the Sigmoid Flexure" (1904)
- "Femoral Hernia" (1901)
- "The Relation of the Physician to Politics" (1903)
- "Diseases of Children" (1904)
- "Recreation as a Sociologic Factor" (1906)
- "Heredity and Environment as Causes of Delinquency and Crime" (1906)
- "Surgery of the Rectum" (1908)
- "Examination and Diagnosis of Rectal Diseases," (1908)
- "Regional Anesthesia in Rectal Work" (1908)
- "Penetrating Wound of Rectum and Bladder" (1909)
- "Some of the Less Common Rectal Diseases" (1910)
- "Malformation of Rectum and Anus" (1911)
- "Pruritus Ani" (1911)

== Sources ==
=== Books ===
- Carleton, Hiram (1903). Genealogical and Family History of the State of Vermont. Vol. II. New York, NY: Lewis Publishing Company – via Internet Archive.
- Dodge, Prentiss Cutler (1912). Encyclopedia of Vermont Biography. Burlington, VT: Ullery Publishing Company – via Google Books.
- Vermont Senate (1917). Journal of the Vermont Senate. Montpelier, VT: Capital City Press – via HathiTrust.

=== Newspapers ===
- "More License". Burlington Free Press. Burlington, VT. March 4, 1903 – via Newspapers.com.
- "Obituary, Dr. D. C. Hawley". Burlington Free Press. Burlington, VT. January 28, 1926 – via Newspapers.com.
- "Funeral of Dr. D. C. Hawley". Burlington Free Press. Burlington, VT. February 2, 1926 – via Newspapers.com.
- "Obituary: Mrs. D. C. Hawley". Burlington Free Press. Burlington, VT. December 20, 1937 – via Newspapers.com.
