= Walter J. Bigelow =

Mayor of Burlington, Vermont

Walter C. Bigelow
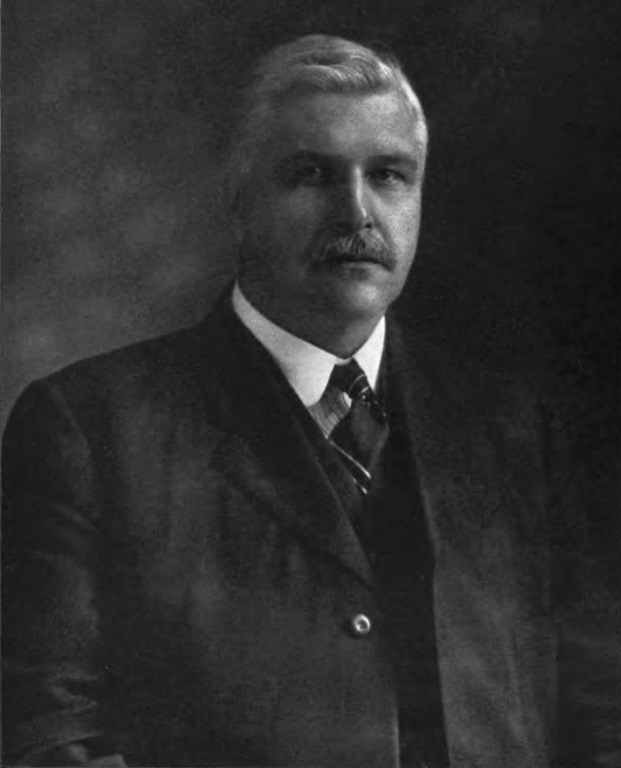
- From Volume II (1913) of New England Families, Genealogical and Memorial

Mayor of Burlington, Vermont
- In office 1907–1909
- Preceded by: James Edmund Burke
- Succeeded by: James Edmund Burke

Personal details
- Born: January 22, 1865 Stowe, Vermont
- Died: May 2, 1935 (aged 70) Hartford, Connecticut
- Resting place: West Branch Cemetery, Stowe, Vermont
- Party: Republican
- Spouse: Florence E. Mooney (m. 1895-1935, his death)
- Children: 1
- Education: University of Vermont (attended)
- Profession: Newspaper editor and publisher

Walter J. Bigelow (January 22, 1865 - May 2, 1935) was an American newspaper editor, author, and politician from Vermont. A Republican, he was most notable for serving as mayor of Burlington from 1907 to 1909 and owning and publishing the St. Johnsbury Caledonian from 1913 to 1918.

== Early life ==
Walter Josephus Bigelow was born in Stowe, Vermont on January 22, 1865, the son of Phineas N. Bigelow and Charlotte E. (Munn) Bigelow. He was educated in the public schools of Stowe, and graduated from Montpelier Seminary in Montpelier in 1889. He received his qualification as a teacher, and taught school for two years before beginning college studies. He attended the University of Vermont in Burlington for three years as a member of the class of 1895, but left before graduating to begin a career in the newspaper business.

== Start of career ==
While attending college, Bigelow worked on the night shift in the editorial room of The Burlington Free Press. In 1894, he was appointed the newspaper's night editor. He held this position he held until 1909. Bigelow was also the Free Press journalist assigned to report on the 1897 session of the Vermont General Assembly. A talented orator, Bigelow was frequently called upon to speak at public events including Memorial Day celebrations and rallies held in support of U.S. involvement in the Spanish–American War.

A Republican, in 1898 Bigelow was appointed to the legislature's Vermont Commission on Double Taxation, a special panel that investigated state laws which subjected to state tax both mortgages used to purchase real estate and the real estate used to secure the mortgages. In 1900, the commission submitted recommendations to address the issue, many of which were adopted in subsequent legislative sessions.

== Continued career ==
In March 1906, Bigelow was the Republican Party's unsuccessful nominee for mayor. In June 1906, he served as chairman of the Vermont Republican Party's state convention. In 1907, he again received the Republican nomination for mayor of Burlington. He defeated incumbent James Edmund Burke and served one term, 1907 to 1909, the first two-year mayoral term created as the result of a change to the city charter. He was a candidate for reelection in 1909 and lost to Burke by 18 votes, 1,658 to 1,640.

After leaving office, Bigelow purchased the St. Johnsbury Caledonian newspaper in 1909. In 1910 he purchased the Ranlet Press, a St. Johnsbury publishing business. Bigelow operated both ventures until 1918. During World War I, Bigelow was a member of Vermont's Public Safety Committee.

Bigelow was an author, and his published works included Vermont: Its Government, an annual publication of the early 1900s to mid-1950s for which Bigelow was responsible from 1919 to 1933. He was also the author of a work about his hometown, 1934's History of Stowe, Vermont. In 1919, Bigelow left St. Johnsbury and accepted an editorial position with the Brattleboro Reformer newspaper in Brattleboro.

== Death and burial ==
Bigelow remained with the Reformer until 1933, when he moved to Hartford, Connecticut. In December 1934 he was struck by a car while crossing the street and his injuries included a broken hip. He died in Hartford on May 2, 1935. Bigelow was buried at West Branch Cemetery in Stowe.

== Family ==
In 1895, Bigelow married Florence E. Mooney (1868-1956) of Mansonville, Quebec, Canada. They were the parents of a daughter, Ruth Barr (1899-1959), who was the wife of Clarence C. Mooney (d. 1956).
