= Milo Lyman Bennett =

American judge

Milo Lyman Bennett (May 28, 1789 – July 7, 1868) was an American jurist who served as an associate justice of the Vermont Supreme Court.

== Biography ==
He was born in Sharon, Connecticut on May 28, 1789, the son of Edmund Bennett (d. 1829) and Mary (Gillet) Bennett (d. 1828). He was educated in Connecticut, and attended Williams College for two years. He graduated from Yale College in 1811, and his classmates included Roger Sherman Baldwin, Ralph Emerson, Henry Collins Flagg, Francis Granger, Levinus Monson, Sidney Edwards Morse, Samuel S. Phelps, Joseph Spencer, Selah B. Strong, Frederick A. Tallmadge, and Joseph Emerson Worcester. He studied at the Litchfield Law School, was admitted to the bar, and settled in Vermont.

He served as State's Attorney of Bennington County for from 1821 to 1822, and in 1833. From 1824 to 1828 he was Bennington County's probate court judge. He moved to Maine in 1836 to pursue a business opportunity involving speculation on undeveloped timber lands, but moved back to Vermont two years later.

In 1839, he became one of the Associate Justices of the Vermont Supreme Court, and he served until 1849. He was a circuit court judge from 1851 to 1852. In 1852 he returned to the Supreme Court, and served until 1859. Judge Bennett received the honorary degree of LL.D. from Dartmouth College in 1851.

In 1859, he was appointed as one of the commissioners to revise and publish the state statutes.

== Death and burial ==
He died in Taunton, Massachusetts on July 7, 1868, aged 78, while on a visit to his son. He was first buried at Elmwood Cemetery in Burlington (then called Locust Street Cemetery), and later re-interred at Burlington's Lakeview Cemetery.

== Family ==
Bennett was married to Adeline Hatch Bennett (1798-1867). They were the parents of Edmund Hatch Bennett, an attorney in Taunton, Massachusetts who served as mayor, judge of probate for Bristol County, Massachusetts, and dean of the Boston University Law School.
