= George H. Prouty =

American politician

George Herbert Prouty
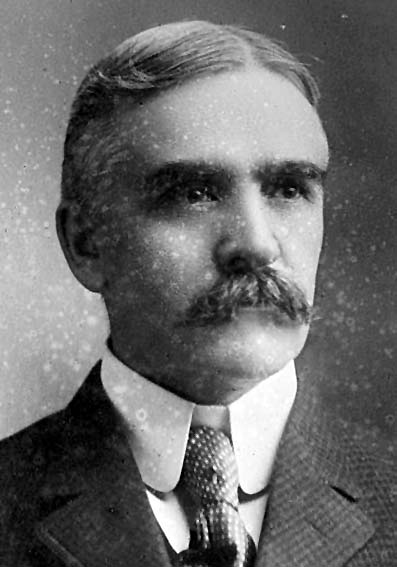

52nd Governor of Vermont
- In office October 8, 1908 – October 5, 1910
- Lieutenant: John A. Mead
- Preceded by: Fletcher D. Proctor
- Succeeded by: John A. Mead

46th Lieutenant Governor of Vermont
- In office October 4, 1906 – October 8, 1908
- Governor: Fletcher D. Proctor
- Preceded by: Charles H. Stearns
- Succeeded by: John A. Mead

Member of the Vermont Senate from Orleans County
- In office 1904–1906 Serving with Chauncey Sullivan Skinner
- Preceded by: Orien Sanda Annis, Lewis Augustus Jackson
- Succeeded by: Charles Edwin Coruth, Homer Henry Somers

Member of the Vermont House of Representatives from Newport
- In office 1896–1898
- Preceded by: John Young
- Succeeded by: Charles F. Ranney

Personal details
- Born: March 4, 1862 Newport, Vermont
- Died: August 18, 1918 (aged 56) Waterville, Quebec
- Party: Republican
- Spouse: Henrietta Allen Prouty (1865 – 1929)
- Education: Bryant & Stratton Commercial College
- Profession: Businessman

George Herbert Prouty (March 4, 1862 – August 18, 1918) of Newport, Vermont, was a Republican member of the Vermont House of Representatives from 1896 to 1897; a member of Vermont State Senate from 1904 to 1906; the 46th lieutenant governor of Vermont from 1906 to 1908; the 52nd governor of Vermont from 1908 to 1910; and Delegate to the 1916 Republican National Convention.

== Biography ==
Born in Newport on March 4, 1862, Prouty was the son of John Azro Prouty and Hannah Barker Lamb Prouty. Besides his brother Charles, his siblings included brother Harley Hall Prouty and sister Nellie Barker Prouty, and two half-brothers, Edgar John Prouty and Willard Robert Prouty. Willard Robert Prouty was the father of Winston L. Prouty.

Educated in the public schools of Newport, Prouty attended St. Johnsbury Academy, graduated from Boston's Bryant & Stratton Commercial College, and was employed in the family business, Prouty and Miller, a sawmill and building supply company. He married Henrietta "Nettie" Allen of Rockville, Connecticut, on December 1, 1890. He was the uncle of United States Senator Winston Prouty, and the brother of Charles A. Prouty, Chairman of the Interstate Commerce Commission and the Progressive candidate for US Senator from Vermont in 1914.

== Career ==
Active in the Republican party, he served in the Vermont House of Representatives from 1896 to 1898. From 1904 to 1906 he was a member of the Vermont State Senate and served as Senate President. Prouty served as Lieutenant Governor from 1906 to 1908.

Prouty was elected on the Republican ticket Governor of Vermont in 1908 and served from October 8, 1908, to October 5, 1910. He favored employers' liability law, and during his administration, the state legislature adopted his suggestion to put the Vermont Railroad Commission under a Public Service Commission designed to supervise all public service corporations. In addition, a State Board of Education and a State Library Commission were founded.

In July 1909, Prouty made news when he posted bail for his chauffeur, who had been accused of striking and killing a St. Hyacinthe, Quebec, man in Burlington during celebrations for the Lake Champlain Tercentenary.

During Prouty's governorship, his Secretary of Civil and Military Affairs (chief assistant) was Aaron H. Grout. Aaron Grout was the son of former Governor Josiah Grout.

== Death and legacy ==
Prouty was killed in Waterville, Quebec, on August 8, 1918, when his chauffeur-driven car was hit by a train as he traveled from Newport to Lennoxville, Quebec, to board a train he was going to take to a business meeting in Maine. He is interred at East Main Street Cemetery, Newport, Vermont.

George Prouty's home was commercially developed and operated for many years as the Governor Prouty Inn, and later turned into senior citizen housing called the Governor Prouty Apartments.

Party political offices
Preceded by Charles H. Stearns	Republican nominee for Lieutenant Governor of Vermont; 1906	Succeeded by John A. Mead
Preceded by Fletcher D. Proctor	Republican nominee for Governor of Vermont; 1908	Succeeded by John A. Mead
Political offices
Preceded by Chauncey W. Brownell	President pro tempore of the Vermont State Senate; 1904 – 1906	Succeeded by William J. Van Patten
Preceded by Charles H. Stearns	Lieutenant Governor of Vermont; 1906—1908	Succeeded by John A. Mead
Preceded by Fletcher D. Proctor	Governor of Vermont; 1908–1910	Succeeded by John A. Mead
