= Albert S. Drew =

Mayor of Burlington, Vermont (1843–1920)

23rd Mayor of Burlington, Vermont
- In office 1915–1917
- Preceded by: James Edmund Burke
- Succeeded by: John Holmes Jackson

Personal details
- Born: November 26, 1843 St. Albans, Vermont, U.S.
- Died: November 21, 1920 (aged 76) Burlington, Vermont, U.S.
- Resting place: Lakeview Cemetery, Burlington, Vermont
- Party: Republican
- Spouse: Mary S. Ray (m. 1865–1905, her death)
- Children: 1

Albert S. Drew (November 26, 1843 – November 21, 1920) was an American business, civic, and political figure from Vermont. A Republican who was a longtime participant in Burlington's municipal government, Drew was most notable for his service as the city's mayor from 1915 to 1917.

== Biography ==
Drew was born in St. Albans, Vermont on November 26, 1843, the son of William W. Drew and Harriet Katherine (Davis) Drew. Drew's parents relocated the family to Burlington shortly after he was born, and Drew was raised and educated in Burlington.

During his career, Drew owned a shoe store, which he operated profitably until he sold it to new owners. He also worked as a salesman and manager for several businesses that had customers in Vermont, including the Baldwin Refrigerator Company of New York City and the Warren Boot & Shoe Company of Boston. A civic activist, he was a member of the Knights Templar and an original member of the Ethan Allen Club. He was an organizer of the fire department's Ethan Allen Engine Company, and served as a volunteer firefighter for more than 50 years.

Beginning in 1882, Drew served several terms on Burlington's Board of Aldermen, elected first from Ward 4, and later from Ward 5. His service included time as president of the board. In 1915, Drew was the successful Republican nominee for mayor, and he served one term, 1915 to 1917.

Drew became ill during the winter of 1919–1920 and resided in two Burlington sanitariums until his death on November 21, 1920. He was buried at Lakeview Cemetery in Burlington.

== Family ==
On May 5, 1865 Drew married Mary S. Ray (1849–1905). They were the parents of a daughter, Florence (1871-1877). At his death, Drew's closest living relative was his uncle, Henry Davis of Burlington.
