= List of mayors of Burlington, Vermont =

Mayor of Burlington, Vermont
- Seal of Burlington

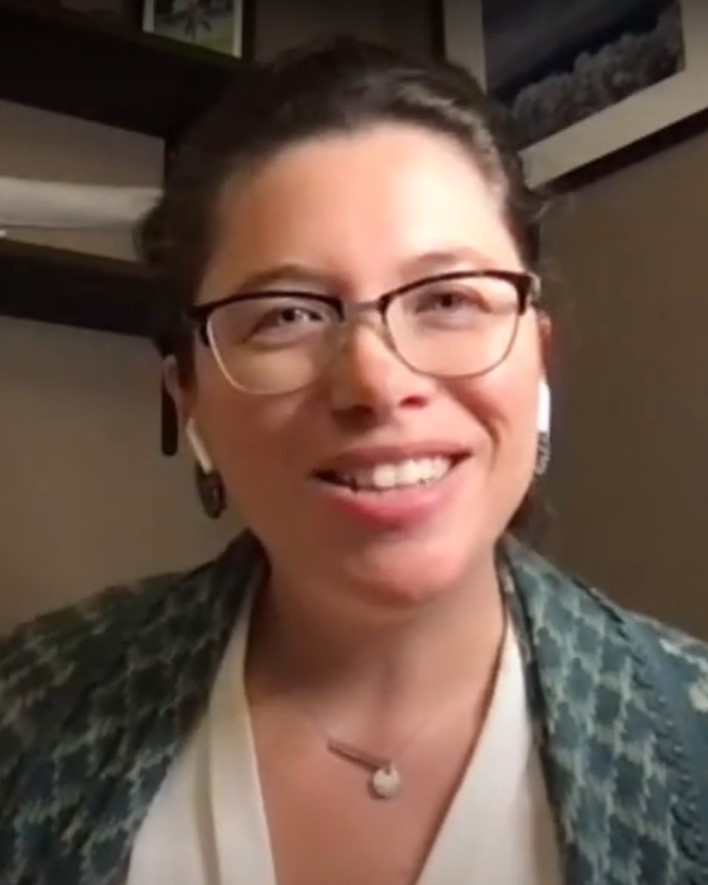
- Incumbent; Emma Mulvaney-Stanak since April 1, 2024
- Term length: 3 years (2 years prior to 2003)
- Constituting instrument: Burlington City Charter
- Formation: 1865
- First holder: Albert L. Catlin
- Salary: $114,309.09 (FY 2021)
- Website: https://www.burlingtonvt.gov/Mayor

The following is a list of mayors of Burlington, Vermont. The 43rd and current mayor is Emma Mulvaney-Stanak, elected in the 2024 Burlington mayoral election.

Mayoral elections in Burlington have been held every three years since 2003.

== List of mayors ==
No.	Mayor	Took office	Left office	Tenure	Party	Election
1	Albert L. Catlin (c. 1809–1884)	February 21, 1865	April 1, 1866	1 year, 39 days	Republican	1865
2	Torrey E. Wales (1820–1902); 1st time	April 2, 1866	April 6, 1868	2 years, 4 days	Republican	1866
2	Torrey E. Wales (1820–1902); 1st time	April 2, 1866	April 6, 1868	2 years, 4 days	Republican	1867
3	Phineas D. Ballou (1823–1877)	April 7, 1868	April 2, 1870	1 year, 360 days	Republican	1868
3	Phineas D. Ballou (1823–1877)	April 7, 1868	April 2, 1870	1 year, 360 days	Republican	1869
4	Daniel Chipman Linsley (1827–1889)	April 3, 1870	October 6, 1870 (Note: Linsley resigned to become assistant chief engineer of the Northern Pacific Railroad.)	186 days	Democratic	1870
–	Torrey E. Wales (1820–1902); 2nd time Acting	October 6, 1870	April 2, 1871	178 days	Republican	–
5	Luther C. Dodge (1821–1901)	April 3, 1871	April 5, 1874	3 years, 2 days	Republican	1871
5	Luther C. Dodge (1821–1901)	April 3, 1871	April 5, 1874	3 years, 2 days	Republican	1872
5	Luther C. Dodge (1821–1901)	April 3, 1871	April 5, 1874	3 years, 2 days	Republican	1873
6	Calvin H. Blodgett (1827–1919)	April 6, 1874	April 2, 1876	1 year, 362 days	Democratic	1874
6	Calvin H. Blodgett (1827–1919)	April 6, 1874	April 2, 1876	1 year, 362 days	Democratic	1875
7	Joseph D. Hatch (1811–1898)	April 3, 1876	April 1, 1883	6 years, 363 days	Republican	1876
7	Joseph D. Hatch (1811–1898)	April 3, 1876	April 1, 1883	6 years, 363 days	Republican	1877
7	Joseph D. Hatch (1811–1898)	April 3, 1876	April 1, 1883	6 years, 363 days	Republican	1878
7	Joseph D. Hatch (1811–1898)	April 3, 1876	April 1, 1883	6 years, 363 days	Republican	1879
7	Joseph D. Hatch (1811–1898)	April 3, 1876	April 1, 1883	6 years, 363 days	Republican	1880
7	Joseph D. Hatch (1811–1898)	April 3, 1876	April 1, 1883	6 years, 363 days	Republican	1881
7	Joseph D. Hatch (1811–1898)	April 3, 1876	April 1, 1883	6 years, 363 days	Republican	1882
8	George H. Morse (1839–1905)	April 2, 1883	April 5, 1885	2 years, 3 days	Republican	1883
8	George H. Morse (1839–1905)	April 2, 1883	April 5, 1885	2 years, 3 days	Republican	1884
9	Urban A. Woodbury (1838–1915)	April 6, 1885	April 3, 1887	1 year, 362 days	Republican	1885
9	Urban A. Woodbury (1838–1915)	April 6, 1885	April 3, 1887	1 year, 362 days	Republican	1886
10	William W. Henry (1831–1915)	April 4, 1887	March 31, 1889	1 year, 361 days	Republican	1887
10	William W. Henry (1831–1915)	April 4, 1887	March 31, 1889	1 year, 361 days	Republican	1888
11	William A. Crombie (1844–1914)	April 1, 1889	April 5, 1891	2 years, 4 days	Republican	1889
11	William A. Crombie (1844–1914)	April 1, 1889	April 5, 1891	2 years, 4 days	Republican	1890
12	Seneca Haselton (1848–1921)	April 6, 1891	April 2, 1894	2 years, 361 days	Democratic	1891
12	Seneca Haselton (1848–1921)	April 6, 1891	April 2, 1894	2 years, 361 days	Democratic	1892
12	Seneca Haselton (1848–1921)	April 6, 1891	April 2, 1894	2 years, 361 days	Democratic	1893
13	William J. Van Patten (1848–1920)	April 3, 1894	April 5, 1896	2 years, 2 days	Republican	1894
13	William J. Van Patten (1848–1920)	April 3, 1894	April 5, 1896	2 years, 2 days	Republican	1895
14	Hamilton S. Peck (1845–1933)	April 6, 1896	April 4, 1898	1 year, 363 days	Republican	1896
14	Hamilton S. Peck (1845–1933)	April 6, 1896	April 4, 1898	1 year, 363 days	Republican	1897
15	Elliot M. Sutton (1841–1908)	April 4, 1898	April 3, 1899	364 days	Democratic	1898
16	Robert Roberts (1848–1939); 1st time	April 3, 1899	March 31, 1901	1 year, 362 days	Republican	1899
16	Robert Roberts (1848–1939); 1st time	April 3, 1899	March 31, 1901	1 year, 362 days	Republican	1900
17	Donly C. Hawley (1855–1926)	April 1, 1901	May 31, 1903 (Note: Hawley was originally declared the winner of the 1903 election. However, Burke challenged the results of the election in court, and the Vermont Supreme Court declared Burke the winner.)	2 years, 60 days	Republican	1901
17	Donly C. Hawley (1855–1926)	April 1, 1901	May 31, 1903	2 years, 60 days	Republican	1902
17	Donly C. Hawley (1855–1926)	April 1, 1901	May 31, 1903	2 years, 60 days	Republican	~~1903~~
18	James Edmund Burke (1849–1943); 1st time	June 1, 1903	March 31, 1907	3 years, 303 days	Democratic	1903
18	James Edmund Burke (1849–1943); 1st time	June 1, 1903	March 31, 1907	3 years, 303 days	Democratic	1904
18	James Edmund Burke (1849–1943); 1st time	June 1, 1903	March 31, 1907	3 years, 303 days	Democratic	1905
18	James Edmund Burke (1849–1943); 1st time	June 1, 1903	March 31, 1907	3 years, 303 days	Democratic	1906
19	Walter J. Bigelow (1865–1935)	April 1, 1907	April 4, 1909	2 years, 3 days	Republican	1907
20	James Edmund Burke (1849–1943); 2nd time	April 5, 1909	April 2, 1911	1 year, 362 days	Democratic	1909
21	Robert Roberts (1848–1939); 2nd time	April 3, 1911	April 6, 1913	2 years, 3 days	Republican	1911
22	James Edmund Burke (1849–1943); 3rd time	April 7, 1913	April 4, 1915	1 year, 362 days	Democratic	1913
23	Albert S. Drew (1843–1920)	April 5, 1915	April 1, 1917	1 year, 361 days	Republican	1915
24	John Holmes Jackson (1871–1944); 1st time	April 2, 1917	April 5, 1925	8 years, 3 days	Democratic	1917
24	John Holmes Jackson (1871–1944); 1st time	April 2, 1917	April 5, 1925	8 years, 3 days	Democratic	1919
24	John Holmes Jackson (1871–1944); 1st time	April 2, 1917	April 5, 1925	8 years, 3 days	Democratic	1921
24	John Holmes Jackson (1871–1944); 1st time	April 2, 1917	April 5, 1925	8 years, 3 days	Democratic	1923
25	Clarence H. Beecher (1877–1959)	April 6, 1925	March 31, 1929	3 years, 359 days	Republican	1925
25	Clarence H. Beecher (1877–1959)	April 6, 1925	March 31, 1929	3 years, 359 days	Republican	1927
26	John Holmes Jackson (1871–1944); 2nd time	April 1, 1929	April 2, 1933	4 years, 1 day	Democratic	1929
26	John Holmes Jackson (1871–1944); 2nd time	April 1, 1929	April 2, 1933	4 years, 1 day	Democratic	1931
27	James Edmund Burke (1849–1943); 4th time	April 3, 1933	March 31, 1935	1 year, 362 days	Democratic	1933
28	Louis F. Dow (1892–1964)	April 1, 1935	June 4, 1939	4 years, 64 days	Republican	1935
28	Louis F. Dow (1892–1964)	April 1, 1935	June 4, 1939	4 years, 64 days	Republican	1937
29	John J. Burns (1894–1984)	June 5, 1939	May 31, 1948 (Note: Burns resigned to accept appointment as Burlington's postmaster.)	8 years, 361 days	Democratic	1939
29	John J. Burns (1894–1984)	June 5, 1939	May 31, 1948	8 years, 361 days	Democratic	1941
29	John J. Burns (1894–1984)	June 5, 1939	May 31, 1948	8 years, 361 days	Democratic	1943
29	John J. Burns (1894–1984)	June 5, 1939	May 31, 1948	8 years, 361 days	Democratic	1945
29	John J. Burns (1894–1984)	June 5, 1939	May 31, 1948	8 years, 361 days	Democratic	1947
–	John Edward Moran (1897–1962); Acting, then elected	June 1, 1948	June 5, 1949	1 year, 4 days	Democratic	–
30	John Edward Moran (1897–1962); Acting, then elected	June 6, 1949	June 2, 1957	7 years, 361 days	Democratic	1949
30	John Edward Moran (1897–1962); Acting, then elected	June 6, 1949	June 2, 1957	7 years, 361 days	Democratic	1951
30	John Edward Moran (1897–1962); Acting, then elected	June 6, 1949	June 2, 1957	7 years, 361 days	Democratic	1953
30	John Edward Moran (1897–1962); Acting, then elected	June 6, 1949	June 2, 1957	7 years, 361 days	Democratic	1955
31	C. Douglas Cairns (1914–1985)	June 3, 1957	June 1, 1959	1 year, 363 days	Republican	1957
32	James E. Fitzpatrick (1908–1967)	June 1, 1959	June 5, 1961	2 years, 4 days	Democratic	1959
33	Robert K. Bing (1930–2023)	June 5, 1961	June 3, 1963	1 year, 363 days	Republican	1961
34	Edward A. Keenan (1894–1970)	June 3, 1963	June 7, 1965	2 years, 4 days	Republican	1963
35	Francis J. Cain (1922–2019)	June 7, 1965	April 5, 1971	5 years, 302 days	Democratic	1965
35	Francis J. Cain (1922–2019)	June 7, 1965	April 5, 1971	5 years, 302 days	Democratic	1967
35	Francis J. Cain (1922–2019)	June 7, 1965	April 5, 1971	5 years, 302 days	Democratic	1969
36	Gordon Paquette (1916–1995)	April 5, 1971	April 6, 1981	10 years, 1 day	Democratic	1971
36	Gordon Paquette (1916–1995)	April 5, 1971	April 6, 1981	10 years, 1 day	Democratic	1973
36	Gordon Paquette (1916–1995)	April 5, 1971	April 6, 1981	10 years, 1 day	Democratic	1975
36	Gordon Paquette (1916–1995)	April 5, 1971	April 6, 1981	10 years, 1 day	Democratic	1977
36	Gordon Paquette (1916–1995)	April 5, 1971	April 6, 1981	10 years, 1 day	Democratic	1979
37	Bernie Sanders (born 1941)	April 6, 1981	April 4, 1989	7 years, 363 days	Independent	1981
37	Bernie Sanders (born 1941)	April 6, 1981	April 4, 1989	7 years, 363 days	Independent	1983
37	Bernie Sanders (born 1941)	April 6, 1981	April 4, 1989	7 years, 363 days	Independent	1985
37	Bernie Sanders (born 1941)	April 6, 1981	April 4, 1989	7 years, 363 days	Independent	1987
38	Peter Clavelle (born 1949); 1st time	April 4, 1989	April 5, 1993	4 years, 1 day	Progressive	1989
38	Peter Clavelle (born 1949); 1st time	April 4, 1989	April 5, 1993	4 years, 1 day	Progressive	1991
39	Peter Brownell (born 1948)	April 5, 1993	April 3, 1995	1 year, 363 days	Republican	1993
40	Peter Clavelle (born 1949); 2nd time	April 3, 1995	April 1, 2006	10 years, 363 days	Progressive (Note: Clavelle briefly switched his party affiliation to the Democratic Party in order to contest the 2004 Vermont gubernatorial election.)	1995
40	Peter Clavelle (born 1949); 2nd time	April 3, 1995	April 1, 2006	10 years, 363 days	Progressive	1997
40	Peter Clavelle (born 1949); 2nd time	April 3, 1995	April 1, 2006	10 years, 363 days	Progressive	1999
40	Peter Clavelle (born 1949); 2nd time	April 3, 1995	April 1, 2006	10 years, 363 days	Progressive	2001
40	Peter Clavelle (born 1949); 2nd time	April 3, 1995	April 1, 2006	10 years, 363 days	Progressive	2003
41	Bob Kiss (born 1947)	April 1, 2006	April 1, 2012	6 years, 0 days	Progressive	2006
41	Bob Kiss (born 1947)	April 1, 2006	April 1, 2012	6 years, 0 days	Progressive	2009
42	Miro Weinberger (born 1970)	April 2, 2012	April 1, 2024	11 years, 365 days	Democratic	2012
42	Miro Weinberger (born 1970)	April 2, 2012	April 1, 2024	11 years, 365 days	Democratic	2015
42	Miro Weinberger (born 1970)	April 2, 2012	April 1, 2024	11 years, 365 days	Democratic	2018
42	Miro Weinberger (born 1970)	April 2, 2012	April 1, 2024	11 years, 365 days	Democratic	2021
43	Emma Mulvaney-Stanak (born 1980/1)	April 1, 2024	Incumbent	2 years, 159 days	Progressive	2024

== Timeline ==
The following is a graphical lifespan timeline of mayors of Burlington. They are listed in order of first assuming office (acting officeholders are not listed).
