= The Burlington Free Press =

American newspaper based in Vermont

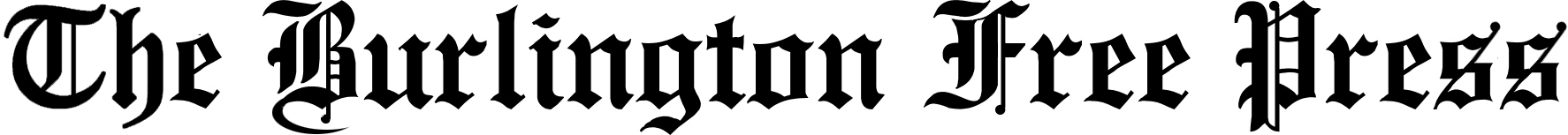
- Type: Daily newspaper
- Format: Tall Tabloid
- Owner: USA Today Co.
- Editor: Justin Trombly
- Founded: 1827 (as the Free Press Weekly)
- Language: English
- Headquarters: 426 Industrial Ave #160; Williston, VT 05495; United States
- Circulation: 5,484 Daily; 7,152 Sunday (as of 2022)
- ISSN: 0894-8844
- OCLC number: 9390458
- Website: www.burlingtonfreepress.com

The Burlington Free Press (BFP or the Free Press) is a digital and print community news organization based in Burlington, Vermont, and owned by USA Today Co. It is one of the official "newspapers of record" for the State of Vermont.

It was founded on June 15, 1827, as a weekly paper and turned daily in 1848 in response to the invention of the telegraph. Today, the Burlington Free Press is part of the USA Today Network and offers local news coverage both in print and online.

== Current format ==
The Burlington Free Press print product is a "tall tab" newspaper that contains specialized sections that cover business, arts & entertainment, sports, food and local history. As a part of the USA Today Network, the Free Press also includes a daily inserted section from USA TODAY that covers national politics, entertainment and sports.

== Coverage area ==
The Burlington Free Press mainly reports on stories that occur in Chittenden County with a focus on the towns of Burlington, Essex, South Burlington, Williston, Colchester, Winooski and Shelburne.

Stories from the Associated Press and from the national USA Today Network are also pulled in to the Burlington Free Press website and printed paper to help round out coverage.

== Online presence ==
The Burlington Free Press website carries both local and national stories, videos and live streams and offers a digital-only subscription as an alternative or supplement to print delivery.

Non-subscribers are limited to five articles per month before they need to subscribe to see more content.

== History ==
=== Early history ===
The Burlington Free Press began as a weekly publication on June 15, 1827. It was created by lawyers Seneca Austin and Luman Foote in response to the 1828 presidential election cycle. The Burlington Sentinel, another Burlington newspaper, favored Andrew Jackson while the Free Press, under Austin and Foote, supported incumbent President John Quincy Adams.

The format of the weekly Burlington Free Press was four pages, with five columns of copy on each page. The paper itself was 18 inches long. The weekly newspaper published every Friday.

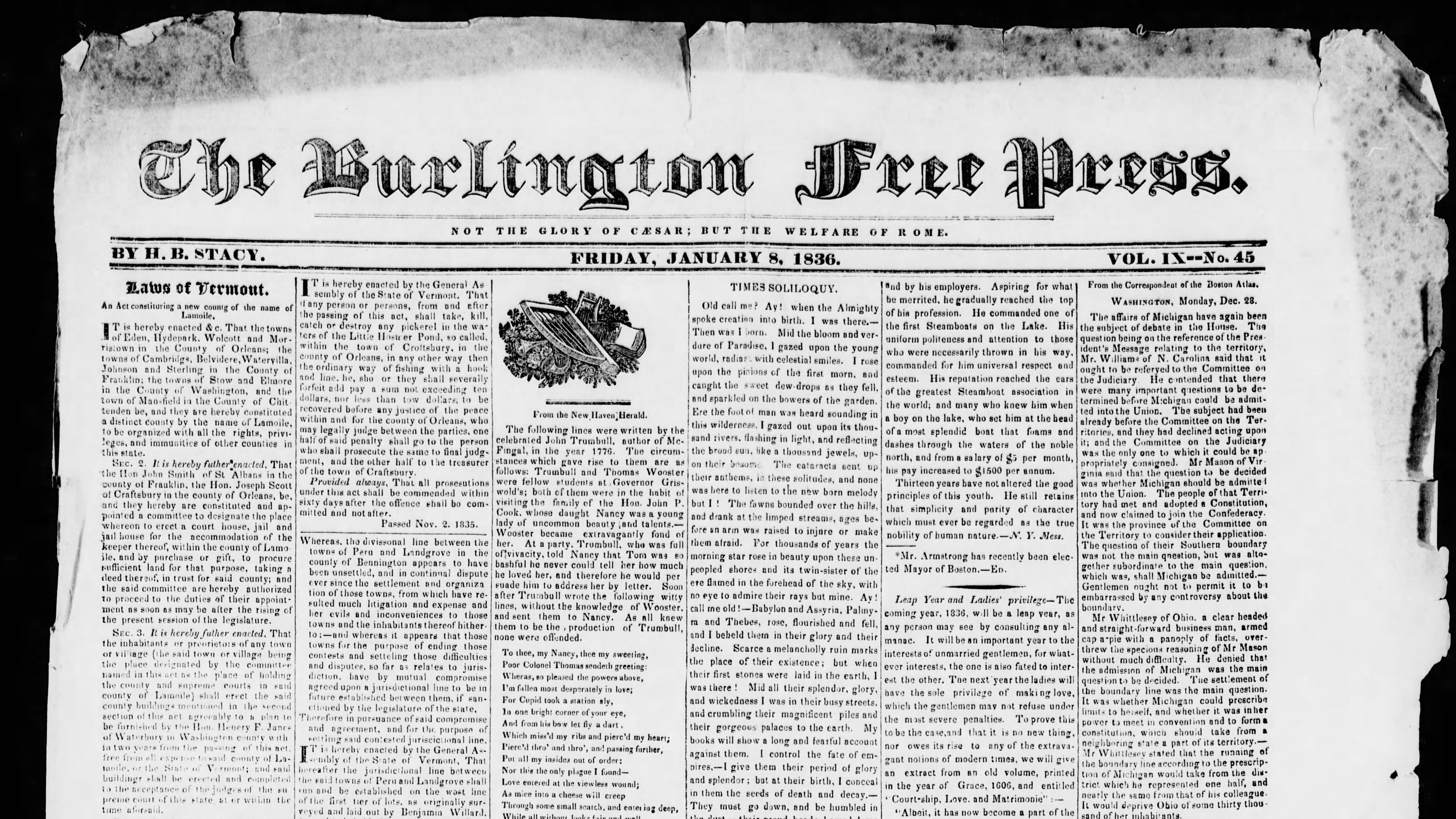
The original motto of the Burlington Free Press was "Not the glory of Caesar, but the welfare of Rome".

The Burlington Free Press became a daily newspaper on April 1, 1848, in response to the invention of the telegraph that brought more up-to-date news to the Burlington area. The first telegraph message was received in Burlington on February 2, 1848.

Editor DeWitt Clinton Clarke (1846-1853) made the following statement regarding the telegraph:

"We trust it did not escape the notice of our readers that our Saturday evening's paper contained news from New York of that very afternoon – half past two o'clock! The wonders achieved by the telegraph are absolutely incredible if one attempts to reflect on the subject."

The daily Burlington Free Press was published in the evening every day except Sunday to offset the leading Burlington morning paper, The Daily Sentinel. The weekly edition was continued on Fridays until March 29, 1923.

The format of the daily Burlington Free Press consisted of one column of editorial, three columns of political and general news, half a column of state and local news and 100 words or less of telegraphic news (reported from afar and transferred via telegraph to Burlington). 15 columns were dedicated to advertisements and "uncalled for letters", a list of people who had not collected their mail from the postmaster.

The daily Burlington Free Press paper cost subscribers $4 a year and was not an immediate success. It had only 275 subscribers in its first year. The population of Burlington was 7,000 at the time. Compare this to the weekly Burlington Free Press which had a circulation of 1,200.

Early coverage included letters from the battlefields of the Civil War, women's suffrage and prohibition.

Under ownership of George Wyllys Benedict and his son George G. Benedict (owners 1853–1897), the paper was strongly and vocally opposed to slavery, which was the issue of the day.

In 1868, the Free Press Association was formed and purchased the Burlington Daily Times, a daily morning newspaper founded by former Burlington Free Press owner and editor DeWitt Clinton Clarke after he sold the Burlington Free Press in 1853 to G.W. Benedict. The Burlington Free Press absorbed the Burlington Daily Times and was suddenly publishing both a morning and an evening edition.

In 1872, The Daily Sentinel, the Burlington Free Press' major competitor in the morning newspaper market closed its doors. The Free Press ceased publishing the evening edition and continued as a morning paper in 1882. In 1890, circulation of the daily Free Press was 3,250.

In 1894, the Free Press employed Walter J. Bigelow as night editor. He remained in this position until 1909. A Republican, he served as mayor of Burlington from 1907 to 1909. The Free Press installed the first Linotype printing press in Vermont in 1895.

In 1900, circulation of the daily Free Press was 4,649. That increased to 7,366 in 1907, 8,569 in 1914 and 11,459 in 1922. In the end of 1922, the Burlington Free Press stopped publication of the Friday weekly edition. In 1927, the Free Press had 14,468 subscribers.

Photo-engraving was added to the Burlington Free Press' capabilities in 1929 and the paper was able to produce photo news coverage.

In 1932, the circulation of the daily Free Press was 16,554 and increased to 23,500 only fifteen years later in 1947. In 1950, the Free Press had 26,703 subscribers. That number rose to 33,225 in 1962.

In the 1960s and 1970s, The Burlington Free Press remained a Republican newspaper in a state that was slowly moving across the political spectrum toward Democratic. The Free Press stood behind Richard Nixon throughout the Watergate scandal.

The Burlington Free Press merged with Gannett. Co., Inc. based in Rochester, N.Y. in 1971.

The Sunday edition of the Burlington Free Press was introduced in 1975 and it became the first seven-day newspaper in Vermont.

=== Recent history ===
In June 2012, the Burlington Free Press switched from broadsheet to all-color tall tabloid format.

March 30, 2014 was the first edition of the Free Press that included the USA TODAY insert showing national news and national sports reporting.

In June 2015, Gannett Company split into two entities: TEGNA and Gannett Company, Inc. The Burlington Free Press fell under the new Gannett Company Inc., which is the publishing side of the old Gannett Company. Gannett Co. Inc. owns USA TODAY, over 100 daily newspapers and nearly 1,000 weekly newspapers.

In February 2024, the newspaper announced it will switch print delivery from carrier to postal.

=== Headquarters ===
From the creation of the Burlington Free Press in 1827 to 1833, the offices were located in Burlington, Vermont on the north side of Court House Square, now City Hall Park, on College St. between Church and St. Paul Streets.

In 1833, new owner Henry B. Stacy built new offices on College Street between South Winooski Avenue and Church Street. He retained the upper floors of the building as a residence for his family.

The offices on College Street continued to grow, and additional space surrounding the building was purchased until it comprised twelve buildings. The buildings were connected by ramps, tunnels and sky-walks to allow freedom of movement for workers in the winter months.

In September 2013, seven of the twelve buildings were sold to the Handy family. The Burlington Free Press held on to the five buildings on South Winooski Ave. that housed the printing press, mail room and circulation department.

On January 20, 2014, the Burlington Free Press offices moved from College Street to occupy the new facility at 100 Bank St.

In 2021, the Burlington Free Press moved out of offices in downtown Burlington to leased space in nearby Williston, VT.

=== Size and format changes ===
The Burlington Free Press has had many size changes and format changes throughout its history, the most drastic of which was in June 2012 when it switched from broadsheet to an all-color "tall tab" format.

==== Burlington Free Press (weekly edition) ====
| Date | Column width | Number of pages |
|---|---|---|
| 1827-1836 | 6 | 4 |
| June 12, 1840 | 7 | 4 |
| February 17, 1854 | 8 | 4 |
| July 3, 1868 | 9 | 4 |
| July 7, 1882 | 8 | 8 |
| July 25, 1884 | 6 | 8 |
| November 9, 1888 | 7 | 8 |
| July 7, 1898 | 8 | 12 |
| January 21, 1904 | 7 | 12 |

==== Burlington Free Press (daily edition) ====
| Date | Columns | Pages |
|---|---|---|
| April 1, 1848 | 5 | 4 |
| January 2, 1866 | 6 | 4 |
| January 4, 1869 | 7 | 4 |
| July 3, 1882 | 8 | 4 |
| December 14, 1885 | 6 | 8 |
| January 6, 1892 | 7 | 8 |
| August 6, 1895 | 8 | 8 |
| January 15, 1904 | 7 | 10 |
| February 20, 1922 | 8 | 12 |
| November 3, 1939 | 8 | 18 |
| January 4, 1957 | 9 | 18 |
| January 1, 1968 | 8 | 22 |
| September 1, 1977 | 5 | Varied |
| January 1, 2000 | 7 | Varied |
| June 7, 2012 | Tabloid format | Varied |

== Awards ==
The Burlington Free Press has won numerous awards and accolades honoring both its reporters and its online presence.

Under ownership and management of the Benedict family (1853-1897), the Free Press was listed several times on the 100 best newspapers in the United States list.

=== Pulitzer Prize ===
The Burlington Free Press was a finalist for a Pulitzer Prize in 2012 for Editorial Writing by Aki Soga and Michael Townsend. Specifically for their campaign that resulted in the state's first reform of open government laws in 35 years.

=== RTDNA Edward R. Murrow Awards ===
The Free Press has won many Edward R. Murrow Awards, a distinction that has historically been reserved for television and radio publications.

| Year | Category | Article | Author(s) | Link to article | Source |
|---|---|---|---|---|---|
| 2014 | National Award - Small Online News Organization - Breaking News | "River Rescue in Jericho" | Ryan Mercer | | |
| 2015 | National Award - Small Online News Organization - Breaking News | "Protesters in Governor's Office" | Kevin Hurley and Ryan Mercer | | |
| 2015 | National Award - Small Online News Organization - Overall Excellence | BurlingtonFreePress.com | | | |
| 2015 | National Award - Small Online News Organization - Video Sports Reporting | "The Need For Speed" | Ryan Mercer | | |
| 2015 | Regional Award - Small Online News Organization - Video Breaking News | "Protectors in Governor's Office" | Kevin Hurley and Ryan Mercer | | |
| 2015 | Regional Award - Small Online News Organization - Video Sports Reporting | "The Need For Speed" | Ryan Mercer | | |
| 2015 | Regional Award - Small Online News Organization - Video Feature Reporting | "Road to the Big Time Starts Here" | Ryan Mercer | | |
| 2015 | Regional Award - Small Online News Organization - Overall Excellence | BurlingtonFreePress.com | | | |
| 2015 | Regional Award - Small Online News Organization - Website | BurlingtonFreePress.com | | | |
| 2016 | National Award - Small Online News Organization - Reporting Sports (Video) | "Slowing Down, Marathon Style" | Ryan Mercer | | |
| 2016 | Regional Award - Small Online News Organization - Video Overall Excellence | "Nectar's takes a look back after 40 years" | Ryan Mercer | | |
| 2016 | Regional Award - Small Online News Organization - Video Feature | "Baseball on Christmas Eve in Vermont?" | Ryan Mercer | | |
| 2016 | Regional Award - Small Online News Organization - Video Sports Reporting | "Slowing Down, Marathon Style" | Ryan Mercer | | |
| 2016 | Regional Award - Small Online News Organization - Website | BurlingtonFreePress.com | | | |
| 2017 | Regional Award - Small Online News Organization - Overall Excellence | "From planes to protests and everything in between" | Ryan Mercer | | |
| 2017 | Regional Award - Small Online News Organization - | "Trump in Burlington stirs emotions on both sides" | Dave Link, Josh Coffee, Nick Gentile, Kevin Hurley and Ryan Mercer | | |
| 2017 | Regional Award - Small Online News Organization - | "Protest march by Bernie Sanders supporters turns into fight over Miss. State flag" | Ryan Mercer | | |

=== New England Newspaper and Press Association ===
The Free Press, in the category "Daily newspapers, Circulation <30,000" has won several awards from the New England Newspaper and Press Association (also known as "NENPA").

| Year | Category | Place | Author(s) |
|---|---|---|---|
| 2016 | Environmental Reporting | 1 | Jess Aloe |
| 2016 | News Feature Photo | 1 | Glenn Russell |
| 2016 | General News Photo | 1 | Glenn Russell |
| 2016 | Portrait Photo | 1 | Ryan Mercer |
| 2016 | News Photo | 1 | Ryan Mercer |
| 2016 | News Photo | 1 | Ryan Mercer |
| 2016 | Sports Video | 1 | Ryan Mercer |
| 2016 | Entertainment Video | 1 | Ryan Mercer |
| 2016 | Spot News Video | 1 | Adam Silverman and Phil Tortora |
| 2016 | Local Personality Profile | 2 | Emilie Stigliani |
| 2016 | Sport News Video | 2 | Ryan Mercer |
| 2016 | Sports Story | 2 | Lauren Read |
| 2016 | Spot News Story | 2 | Adam Silverman and Elizabeth Murray |
| 2016 | Best Niche Publication | 3 | Freshies Magazine |
| 2016 | News Video | 3 | Ryan Mercer |
| 2016 | Feature Video | 3 | Nick Gentile, Dave Link, Josh Coffee, Kevin Hurley and Ryan Mercer |
| 2016 | Feature Video | 3 | Ryan Mercer |
| 2016 | Sports Video | 3 | Ryan Mercer |
| 2016 | Spot News Video | 3 | Ryan Mercer |

=== Vermont Press Association ===
| Year | Category | Place | Author(s) |
|---|---|---|---|
| 2014 | General Excellence (Daily) | 1 | |
| 2014 | Best Website (Daily) | 1 | |
| 2014 | Sportswriting | 1 | Austin Danforth |
| 2014 | Feature Writing | 1 | Molly Walsh |
| 2014 | Best Local Story | 1 | Mike Donoghue |
| 2014 | Rookie of the Year | 1 | April (Burbank) McCullum |
| 2014 | Matthew Lyon First Amendment Award | 1 | Mike Donoghue |
| 2014 | John D. Donoghue | 1 | Brent Hallenbeck |
| 2014 | Sportswriting | 2 | Alex Abrami |
| 2014 | Best State Story | 2 | Mike Donoghue |
| 2014 | Sportswriting | 3 | Lauren Read |
| 2014 | Feature Writing | 3 | Sally Pollak |
| 2015 | General Excellence (Daily) | 1 | |
| 2015 | Best Website (Daily) | 1 | |
| 2015 | Best Local Story | 1 | April (Burbank) McCullum |
| 2015 | Best Lifestyle Column | 1 | Chris Bohjalian |
| 2015 | Best Feature Writing | 1 | Dan D'Ambrosio |
| 2015 | Best Sportswriting | 1 | Austin Danforth |
| 2015 | Best Sports Photo | 1 | Ryan Mercer |
| 2015 | General News Photo | 1 | Glenn Russell |
| 2015 | Mavis Doyle Award | 1 | April (Burbank) McCullum |
| 2015 | Sportswriting | 2 | Alex Abrami |
| 2015 | Sportswriting | 3 | Lauren Read |
| 2016 | General Excellence (Daily) | 1 | |
| 2016 | Outstanding Website | 1 | |
| 2016 | Best State Story | 1 | April (Burbank) McCullum |
| 2016 | Best Feature Photo | 1 | Ryan Mercer |
| 2016 | Best Sports Photo | 1 | Ryan Mercer |
| 2016 | Best Column-Feature | 1 | Alex Abrami |
| 2016 | Best Sportswriting (Daily) | 1 | Austin Danforth |
| 2016 | Best Local Story | 1 | Joel Banner Baird |

=== Scripps Howard National Journalism Awards ===
The Burlington Free Press won the "Distinguished Service to the First Amendment" award from the Scripps Howard Foundation in 2010 for its editorial work focusing on open government during the 2010 elections. It was a finalist in 2008 for the same award.

=== Associated Press Media Editors Association Journalism Excellence Awards ===
| Year | Category | Topic | Source |
|---|---|---|---|
| 2011 | First Amendment | For demanding transparency from Vermont's public officials. | |
| 2012 | First Amendment | For its investigation of the handling of warrants by the Vermont judiciary system. | |
| 2012 | Digital Storytelling and Reporting | For breaking news coverage during the Occupy Burlington encampment. | |

== Content ==
=== Format ===
Today, the Burlington Free Press is printed in full color and produced in 'butterfly' format. Each section is layered on top of each other and then the whole paper is folded in half to create one booklet. The sections can be separated, or read together.

=== Sections ===
==== Main ====
The 'Main' or 'A' section of the Burlington Free Press contains news coverage including politics, society, weather, crime, education and sports. It also contains obituaries, birth announcements, wedding announcements and advertisements from both local and national businesses. Depending on the day of the week, the section can be anywhere from 16 to 32 pages in length.

==== USA TODAY ====
The USA TODAY section is included every day as the 'B' section of the paper. It is produced at the national USA TODAY office and is inserted into the Burlington Free Press at the time of printing. It contains national news, politics, entertainment and business.

==== Innovate ====
The Burlington Free Press publishes its business and technology news in a weekly Innovate section on Thursdays. This section also includes the jobs listings.

==== Weekend ====
The Weekend section publishes on Thursdays. It contains arts and entertainment news from around Burlington and Chittenden County. This section also includes the crossword puzzle, jumble, comics and TV guide.

==== Savorvore ====
Printed on Fridays, Savorvore is the Burlington Free Press' food section. It features recipes, restaurant profiles and an area restaurant guide.

==== History Space ====
Printed on Sundays, the History Space features local history profiles written by community members, professors and historians.

==== Premium Editions ====
The Free Press publishes Premium Editions of the paper that focus on certain national or local topics. The edition costs $1 extra and is included in the Sunday paper four times a year.

=== Writing style ===
The Burlington Free Press follows AP Style.

=== Additional print products ===
==== Freshies ====
Freshies is a ski and snowboarding magazine produced by the Burlington Free Press and Free Press Media. It features articles written by experts, photography and advertisements for winter equipment, resorts, restaurants and beer. It publishes two times a year: Spring and Fall.

==== Hometown Weekly ====
Hometown Weekly is a community news publication that is mailed out to households that do not subscribe to the Burlington Free Press within Chittenden County. It features photos and stories focused on community and local events. Total distribution of this product is 42,000 homes.

==== Buyers Digest ====
Buyers Digest Mega is a community news publication that is mailed out to non-subscribers in Franklin County, Vermont and select homes in Addison County and Lamoille County. It features advertisements tailored to that community as well as photos and short articles.

==== Real Estate Extra ====
Real Estate Extra (also referred to as "REX") is a monthly glossy magazine featuring advertisements and home listings from Vermont's largest real estate companies. It is delivered with the Burlington Free Press to homes in Chittenden County and Franklin County and is placed in racks in various retail locations around Burlington.

== Podcasts ==
The Burlington Free Press co-produces a craft-beer podcast called It's the Beer Talking with Farrell Distributing, Vermont's largest beverage distribution company. The hosts, Jeff Baker and Jason Strempek both work for Farrell Distributing as does co-producer Ryan Chaffin. The podcast is co-produced, edited and recorded by Sophia Trigg, News and Social Media assistant at the Burlington Free Press.

Episodes are released weekly on Tuesdays and are 20–40 minutes in length.

Each episode begins with a beer-sampling segment called "What's in the Fridge?". It then features an interview with a leader in the beer industry. Past guests have included Ken Grossman, founder/CEO of Sierra Nevada, and guests from large brands like Goose Island Brewery and Citizen Cider.

== Staff ==
=== Ownership history ===
| Tenure | Owner | Sources |
|---|---|---|
| 1827-1833 | Seneca Austin and Luman Foote | |
| 1833-1846 | Henry B. Stacy | |
| 1846-1853 | DeWitt Clinton Clarke | |
| 1853-1866 | George Wyllys Benedict | |
| 1866-1868 | George Grenville Benedict | |
| 1868-1897 | Free Press Association (controlling interest owned by George Grenville Benedict) | |
| 1897-1927 | Free Press Association (controlling interest owned by Willard B. Howe) | |
| 1927-1961 | Free Press Association (controlling interest owned by David Howe) | |
| 1961-1971 | J. Warren McClure | |
| 1971-2015 | Gannett Company | |
| 2015-current | Gannett Co. Inc. | |

=== Executive editors ===
| Tenure | Editor | Photo | Sources |
|---|---|---|---|
| 1827–1833 | Luman Foote | | |
| 1833–1846 | Henry B. Stacy | | |
| 1846–1853 | DeWitt Clinton Clarke | | |
| 1853–1866 | George Wyllys Benedict | | |
| 1866–1907 | George Grenville Benedict | | |
| 1907–1932 | John L. Southwick | | |
| 1932–1958 | Edward F. Crane | | |
| 1958–1976 | Gordon T. Mills | | |
| 1978–1980 | Sidney H. Hurlburt | | |
| 1980–1983 | James L. Wilson | | |
| 1983–1988 | James E. Welch | | |
| 1988–1994 | Ronald L. Thornburg | | |
| 1994–1997 | Jennifer Carroll | | |
| 1997–2001 | Mickey Hirten | | |
| 2001–2015 | Michael Townsend | | |
| 2016–2017 | Denis Finley | | |
| 2017–2019 | Michael Kilian | | |
| 2019–2022 | Emilie Stigliani | | |
| 2022–2024 | Aki Soga | Aki Soga, editor, Burlington Free Press | |
| 2025–present | Justin Trombly | | |

=== Notable staff members ===
Madeline Kunin, former governor of Vermont, joined the Burlington Free Press in 1957 after graduating at Columbia University's journalism school. She left the Free Press in 1958 to take a job at the Brussels World's Fair. In 1984, Kunin was elected Vermont's first female governor.

== Major coverage ==
=== Bernie Sanders' 2016 presidential campaign ===
Because The Burlington Free Press is from the hometown of Sen. Bernie Sanders, their staff led the charge on behalf of the USA Today Network during Bernie Sanders' presidential primary campaign in 2015–16. Free Press reporters and editors traveled to campaign stops across the country and reported back on Sanders' progress.

Videographer Ryan Mercer created an award-winning video reflection on the Sanders campaign in November 2016.
