= Bradley Smalley =

American politician (1835–1909)

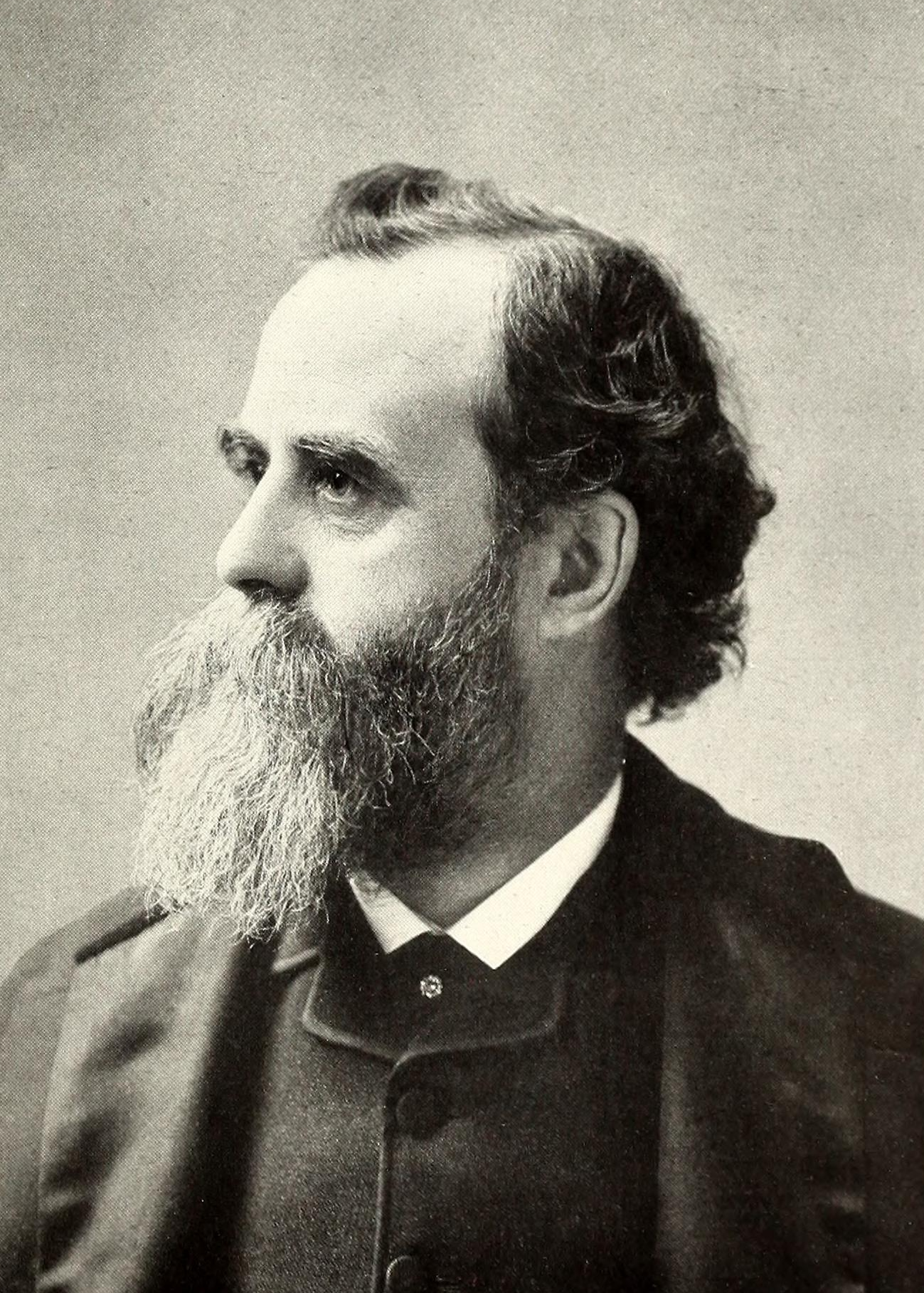

Collector of the Port of Burlington
- In office September 1, 1893 – October 1, 1897
- Preceded by: George Grenville Benedict
- Succeeded by: Olin Merrill
- In office September 1, 1885 – September 1, 1889
- Preceded by: William Wells
- Succeeded by: George Grenville Benedict

Member of the Vermont House of Representatives from Burlington
- In office 1878–1880
- Preceded by: Torrey E. Wales
- Succeeded by: Russell S. Taft
- In office 1874–1876
- Preceded by: Phineas D. Ballou
- Succeeded by: Torrey E. Wales

Personal details
- Born: Bradley Barlow Smalley; November 26, 1835 Jericho, Vermont, U.S.
- Died: November 6, 1909 (aged 73) Burlington, Vermont, U.S.
- Resting place: Greenmount Cemetery, Burlington, Vermont, U.S.
- Party: Democratic
- Spouse: Caroline Maria Baxter (m. 1860–1909)
- Children: 5
- Parent: David Allen Smalley (father)
- Relatives: Bradley Barlow (uncle); Carlos Baxter (father-in-law); Portus Baxter (uncle-in-law); John Holmes Jackson (son-in-law)

Military service
- Branch/service: Vermont Militia
- Years of service: 1861–1863
- Rank: Colonel
- Battles/wars: American Civil War

Bradley Barlow Smalley (November 26, 1835 – November 6, 1909) was an American politician who served in the Vermont House of Representatives for two terms and on the Burlington Board of Aldermen. He was the Collector of the Port of Burlington from 1885 to 1889, and 1893 to 1897, and was a member of the Democratic National Committee from 1875 to 1908.

Smalley was born in Jericho, Vermont, the son of David Allen Smalley. He became a court clerk in 1861, was admitted to the bar in 1863, and was a founding member of the Vermont Bar Association. During the American Civil War he worked as an aide-de-camp under Governor Frederick Holbrook. Heavily involved in the activities of the Vermont Democratic Party, Smalley was Vermont's member to the DNC and attended four Democratic National Conventions. He unsuccessfully sought the positions of speaker, United States Senator, and Governor of Vermont.

== Early life ==
Bradley Barlow Smalley was born on November 26, 1835, in Jericho, Vermont, to jurist David Allen Smalley and Laura Barlow, the daughter of banker and politician Bradley Barlow. Their family moved to Burlington, Vermont, when Smalley was four years old.

== Career ==
=== Legal and business career ===
William H. Hoyt resigned from his position as clerk of the United States District Court for the District of Vermont on January 1, 1861. Smalley was appointed to replace him the same day and held the position until July 1, 1885. That same year Governor Frederick Holbrook selected him as an aide-de-camp with the rank of colonel, and he assisted with the enlisting, equipping, and forwarding to the front lines of Vermont recruits during the American Civil War.

Smalley was admitted to the bar in Chittenden County on October 3, 1863, and the United States District Court for the Northern District of New York in 1869. When his father resigned from his judicial position in 1877, Smalley personally delivered the resignation letter to Washington, D.C. He was a founding member of the Vermont Bar Association in 1878.

In 1869, Morrillo Noyes, Smalley, and other people purchased the Sentinel, a newspaper in Burlington which had ceased publication shortly before. Smalley served a director of the Central Vermont Railway and Rutland Railroad Company.

President Grover Cleveland appointed Smalley collector of the port of Burlington, a position his father held, and he served from September 1, 1885, to September 1, 1889, and September 1, 1893, to October 1, 1897. Smalley was replaced by George Grenville Benedict in 1889, and Olin Merrill in 1897.

President Benjamin Harrison created a commission to negotiate with the Cheyenne in 1890, and place them into an indian reservation. Nelson A. Miles chaired the commission, and Smalley was one of its members. An agreement in October 1890 resulted in the Cheyenne ceding their land and each member being given 160 acres of land.

=== Party politics ===
Smalley was appointed to the committee of Burlington's Democratic Party in 1855, and chaired the Burlington Democratic caucus in 1870. At the 1855 state convention of the Vermont Democratic Party he was assistant secretary and one of the secretaries at the 1869 state convention. He was elected to the state committee of the Vermont Democrats in 1870. He was the political boss of the Vermont Democrats and was in charge of political patronage.

Smalley was a substitute delegate from Vermont's 3rd congressional district to the 1860 Democratic National Convention in Charleston, South Carolina, and an alternate delegate to the 1866 National Union Convention. As a delegate to the 1872 Democratic National Convention, he served on the committee on permanent organization. He was a delegate to the 1876, 1880, and 1884 conventions. An opponent of free silver, Smalley fought for the gold standard in the platform at the 1896 convention. He opposed William Randolph Hearst's candidacy at the 1904 convention and stated that nominating Hearst would be "suicide for the Democratic Party".

H.B. Smith, Vermont's member of the Democratic National Committee, died in 1875, and Smalley was appointed to replace him. He held the position until he declined to seek reelection in 1908, citing poor health, and was succeeded by Thomas H. Brown. The DNC selected him to serve as secretary in 1892.

=== Local and state politics ===
In 1865, Smalley was elected as an election inspector for Burlington's South Ward. Leverett B. Englesby defeated Smalley for Chittenden County State's Attorney in 1866 and 1867. L. Underwood resigned as alderman from the North Ward in 1865, and Smalley ran to replace him, but lost to Noble B. Flanagan. F.M. Van Sicklen defeated Smalley for a seat on Burlington's Board of Aldermen from the south ward in 1868.

At the 1874 Burlington Democratic caucus he nominated Calvin H. Blodgett for mayor. Blodgett, a member of the Board of Aldermen, was elected mayor, and a special election was held for his 5th ward seat. The Republicans and Democrats both gave their nominations to Smalley, who won and was reelected in 1875.

In 1874, Smalley was elected to represent Burlington in the Vermont House of Representatives. 52 representatives voted for him in the 1874 Speaker vote on the second ballot, behind H. Henry Powers's 125. Torrey E. Wales defeated him in 1876, but he defeated Wales in 1878. During his tenure he proposed legislation to move the state's capital from Montpelier, Vermont, to Burlington.

Incumbent U.S. Senator George F. Edmunds defeated Smalley in the 1880 U.S. Senate election and Republican nominee Levi K. Fuller defeated Smalley in the 1892 gubernatorial election.

== Personal life ==
Smalley was an Episcopalian. He married Caroline Maria Baxter on June 4, 1860, in Burlington, and the couple had five children. Caroline was the niece of U.S. Representative Portus Baxter and daughter of Carlos Baxter, who served in the state legislature as a Whig. One of their children died from diphtheria at age 7 in 1885. Smalley's daughter Caroline married John Holmes Jackson.

Smalley died in Burlington on November 6, 1909, and Caroline died on March 16, 1915. They were buried at Greenmount Cemetery in Burlington. After Smalley's death, his daughter and Jackson donated land that formerly belonged to him to become a park in Burlington.

== Electoral history ==
Electoral history of Bradley Smalley
Year	Office	Party	Primary			General			Result	Ref.
Year	Office	Party	Total	%	P.	Total	%	P.	Result	Ref.
1868	Burlington Board of Aldermen (South Ward)	Unknown	No primary			105	46.46%	2nd	Lost	
1868	Burlington Board of Aldermen (South Ward)	Democratic	No primary			105	46.46%	2nd	Lost	
1874	Burlington Board of Aldermen (5th)	Democratic; Republican	No primary			201	94.37%	1st	Won	
1880	United States Senate	Democratic	No primary			16	7.31%	2nd	Lost	
1892	Governor of Vermont	Democratic	No primary			19,216	32.09%	2nd	Lost	

== Works cited ==
=== Books ===
- Carleton, Hiram (1903). Genealogical and Family History of the State of Vermont: A Record of the Achievements of Her People in the Making of a Commonwealth and the Founding of a Nation. Vol. 2. Lewis Publishing Company.

=== Newspapers ===
- "1860 Democratic Delegates". Burlington Times. February 15, 1860. p. 7 – via Newspapers.com.
- "1860 Democratic Delegates". Burlington Weekly Free Press. February 24, 1860. p. 1 – via Newspapers.com.
- "1865 Elections". Burlington Times. February 25, 1865. p. 1 – via Newspapers.com.
- "1865 North Ward Election". The Burlington Free Press. August 4, 1865. p. 2 – via Newspapers.com.
- "1865 Resignation". Burlington Times. August 3, 1865. p. 3 – via Newspapers.com.
- "1867 Election Results". Burlington Weekly Free Press. September 6, 1867. p. 2 – via Newspapers.com.
- "1874 Speaker Vote". The United Opinion. October 17, 1874. p. 2 – via Newspapers.com.
- "1875 Election Results". The Rutland Daily Globe. March 4, 1875. p. 3 – via Newspapers.com.
- "Appointments". The Burlington Free Press. December 6, 1861. p. 2 – via Newspapers.com.
- "At The Seat of Customs". Burlington Clipper. September 5, 1889. p. 1 – via Newspapers.com.
- "B.B. Smalley Off For Chicago". The Burlington Free Press. July 3, 1896. p. 1 – via Newspapers.com.
- "Biography". The Daily Journal. October 2, 1878. p. 2 – via Newspapers.com.
- "Bradley Smalley Clerk". Vermont Journal. January 26, 1861. p. 8 – via Newspapers.com.
- "Burlington Recipient of Magnificent Gift". Rutland Herald. April 24, 1920. p. 1 – via Newspapers.com.
- "Chittenden County Court". The Burlington Times. October 5, 1863. p. 3 – via Newspapers.com.
- "Chittenden County Democratic Convention". The Burlington Weekly Sentinel. August 23, 1855. p. 2 – via Newspapers.com.
- "City Election – Money Did It". Burlington Daily Sentinel. September 5, 1876. p. 3 – via Newspapers.com.
- "Col. Bradley B. Smalley Dead After Long And Active Career". Burlington Daily News. November 8, 1909. p. 5 – via Newspapers.com.
- "Collector Smalley's Little Daughter Dies". Rutland Herald. November 5, 1885. p. 1 – via Newspapers.com.
- "Committees". The Burlington Free Press. July 12, 1872. p. 3 – via Newspapers.com.
- "Death Comes To B.B. Smalley". The Burlington Free Press. November 8, 1909. p. 1 – via Newspapers.com.
- "Death of Carlos Baxter". Rutland Herald. January 30, 1874. p. 3 – via Newspapers.com.
- "Delegates". The Burlington Free Press. June 15, 1870. p. 3 – via Newspapers.com.
- "Democratic Caucus". St. Albans Messenger. March 14, 1874. p. 3 – via Newspapers.com.
- "Democratic City Caucus". The Burlington Free Press. February 25, 1874. p. 3 – via Newspapers.com.
- "Democratic Convention". Argus and Patriot. June 23, 1870. p. 3 – via Newspapers.com.
- "Democratic Day". The Burlington Free Press. June 26, 1908. p. 9 – via Newspapers.com.
- "Democratic National Committee". St. Albans Messenger. October 16, 1876. p. 3 – via Newspapers.com.
- "Democratic State Convention". Argus and Patriot. November 8, 1855. p. 2 – via Newspapers.com.
- "Democratic State Convention". St. Albans Messenger. June 18, 1869. p. 3 – via Newspapers.com.
- "Election in Burlington". Rutland Herald. September 4, 1878. p. 3 – via Newspapers.com.
- "Election Notice". The Burlington Free Press. March 20, 1874. p. 2 – via Newspapers.com.
- "Election of United States Senator". The Daily Journal. October 20, 1880. p. 2 – via Newspapers.com.
- "Fifth Ward Election". Burlington Weekly Free Press. March 27, 1874. p. 3 – via Newspapers.com.
- "Fifth Ward Republican Caucus". The Burlington Free Press. March 13, 1874. p. 3 – via Newspapers.com.
- "For Alderman, South Ward, Bradley B. Smalley". The Burlington Weekly Sentinel. December 11, 1868. p. 3 – via Newspapers.com.
- "Lightning Strikes a Vermont Democrat". The Burlington Free Press. October 7, 1890. p. 4 – via Newspapers.com.
- "Marriages". Vermont Phoenix. June 9, 1860. p. 3 – via Newspapers.com.
- "Merrill Succeeds Smalley". Rutland Herald. October 2, 1897. p. 1 – via Newspapers.com.
- "Mrs. B. B. Smalley". St. Albans Messenger. March 17, 1915. p. 3 – via Newspapers.com.
- "Newspaperial". North Star. April 9, 1869. p. 3 – via Newspapers.com.
- "Opposed to Hearst". St. Albans Messenger. March 26, 1904. p. 1 – via Newspapers.com.
- "Personal". The Burlington Free Press. March 26, 1869. p. 3 – via Newspapers.com.
- "Political Points". The St. Johnsbury Caledonian. August 11, 1892. p. 4 – via Newspapers.com.
- "Port of Burlington". The Vermont Watchman. July 29, 1885. p. 2 – via Newspapers.com.
- "Pretty Good Endorsement". Rutland Herald. February 11, 1890. p. 3 – via Newspapers.com.
- "Removal of the State House". Bellows Falls Times. November 13, 1874. p. 2 – via Newspapers.com.
- "Resignation of Judge Smalley". St. Albans Messenger. February 20, 1877. p. 4 – via Newspapers.com.
- "Sale of the Burlington Sentinel". Vermont Daily Transcript. March 25, 1869. p. 3 – via Newspapers.com.
- "Smalley Wins Vermont". The Burlington Free Press. July 14, 1908. p. 1 – via Newspapers.com.
- "State's Attorney Nomination". The Burlington Free Press. August 30, 1867. p. 4 – via Newspapers.com.
- "State Bar Association". Rutland Herald. October 24, 1878. p. 3 – via Newspapers.com.
- "The Cheyenne Commission". St. Johnsbury Republican. October 30, 1890. p. 1 – via Newspapers.com.
- "The Cheyenne Commission". Helena Independent. November 6, 1890. p. 7 – via Newspapers.com.
- "The City Election". Burlington Times. May 16, 1865. p. 3 – via Newspapers.com.
- "The South Ward Election". The Burlington Weekly Sentinel. December 18, 1868. p. 3 – via Newspapers.com.
- "Union State Convention". Burlington Weekly Sentinel. July 27, 1866. p. 2 – via Newspapers.com.
- "Vermont Spoils". Bennington Banner. December 16, 1892. p. 2 – via Newspapers.com.
- "Vermont State Election". Burlington Times. September 6, 1866. p. 3 – via Newspapers.com.
- "Vermont State Election". Lamoille Newsdealer. September 16, 1874. p. 2 – via Newspapers.com.

=== Web ===
- "1892 Gubernatorial Election". Secretary of State of Vermont. Archived from the original on February 8, 2025.
- "Proclamation 327—Opening to Settlement Certain Lands Acquired from the Cheyenne and Arapahoe Indians". The American Presidency Project. Archived from the original on February 8, 2025.
