= John Holmes Jackson =

American politician (1871–1944)

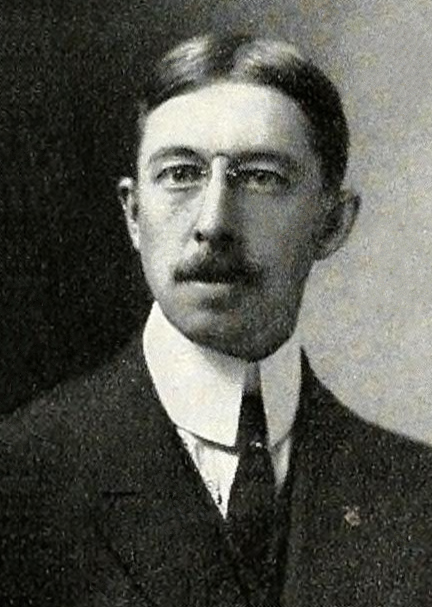
- Photograph of John Holmes Jackson published in 1911

24th and 26th Mayor of Burlington, Vermont
- In office April 1, 1929 – April 3, 1933
- Preceded by: Clarence H. Beecher
- Succeeded by: James Edmund Burke
- In office April 2, 1917 – April 6, 1925
- Preceded by: Albert S. Drew
- Succeeded by: Clarence H. Beecher

Member of the Vermont House of Representatives from Burlington
- In office January 5, 1921 – January 2, 1923
- Preceded by: Theodore E. Hopkins
- Succeeded by: Levi P. Smith

Personal details
- Born: March 21, 1871 Montreal, Canada
- Died: December 15, 1944 (aged 73) Burlington, Vermont, U.S.
- Resting place: Lakeview Cemetery, Burlington, Vermont
- Party: Democratic
- Other political affiliations: Bull Moose
- Spouse: Caroline Deming Smalley
- Children: 1
- Relatives: David Allen Smalley (grandfather-in-law); Bradley Smalley (father-in-law); Samuel Hollister Jackson (brother); Horatio Nelson Jackson (brother)
- Education: Philadelphia Dental College

John Holmes Jackson (March 21, 1871 – December 15, 1944) was an American dentist and politician who served as the 24th and 26th mayor of Burlington, Vermont. He represented Burlington in the Vermont House of Representatives from 1921 to 1923.

Jackson was born in Montreal, Canada, and educated in Kingston, Ontario, before graduating from the Pennsylvania College of Dental Surgery. His family was active in politics with his brother Samuel Hollister Jackson being elected lieutenant governor and his father-in-law being Bradley Smalley. He moved to Burlington in 1896, and became active in politics in the 1910s with an unsuccessful campaign for school commissioner as a Progressive.

The Democratic Party gave its mayoral nomination to Jackson in 1917, and he defeated incumbent Albert S. Drew. Jackson never lost a mayoral election and sometimes received both the Republican and Democratic nominations. He oversaw Burlington's response to the Spanish flu and Great Depression while also reforming its garbage collection system, motorizing the fire department, hiring its first female police officer, and replacing its trolley system with busses. Jackson and James Edmund Burke opposed each other in the 1929 and 1931 elections, but Jackson endorsed Burke to be his successor.

Jackson was a delegate to multiple state and national conventions, serving as the chair of the Democratic delegation to the 1920 national convention and receiving a vote during the presidential balloting of the 1924 convention. He unsuccessfully ran for governor in 1922, and lieutenant governor in 1930.

== Early life ==
John Holmes Jackson was born in Montreal, Canada, on March 21, 1871, to Samuel Nelson Jackson (1838–1913) and Mary Ann Parkyn (1843–1916). His father, a Canadian born to American parents, was a Congregationalist pastor who attended the International Congregational Council in 1891. Jackson was educated in Kingston, Ontario, and graduated from the Collegiate Institute in Kingston. In 1890, Jackson graduated with a dental degree from the Philadelphia Dental College in the United States, and performed dentistry in Barre, Vermont, before moving to Burlington, Vermont, in 1896. He was appointed to the Vermont State Dental Society's executive committee in 1899, became president in 1903, and was appointed to Vermont's board of dental examiners by Governor Charles J. Bell in 1904.

Jackson ran for a seat on the Burlington school commission from the 6th ward with the Bull Moose nomination in 1913, but placed third behind Republican nominee Roy L. Patrick and Democratic nominee John W. Coffey. In 1914, he was selected as a committee-member for the Burlington Bull Moose Party from the 6th ward and was a delegate to the party's state convention.

== Mayor ==
=== Elections ===
The Burlington Democrats gave their mayoral nomination to Jackson on February 16, 1917, by a unanimous vote. He defeated incumbent Republican Albert S. Drew by ten votes. He defeated Republican nominees Harris R. Watkins in 1919, and William B. McKillip in 1921.

Roy L. Patrick, the president of the board of aldermen, declined to seek the Republican mayoral nomination in 1923, State Senator Martin S. Vilas put forward Jackson for the nomination, and the Republican caucus accepted it. It was the first time in Burlington's history that the Republicans endorsed the Democratic mayoral candidate, and Jackson won without opposition. The Democratic caucus gave its nomination to Jackson on February 4, 1925, but he declined to run, and Republican Clarence H. Beecher was elected to succeed him. Jackson, after leaving office, was appointed to a five-year term as a Burlington park commissioner.

In 1929, Jackson defeated James Edmund Burke for the Democratic nomination and also received the Republican nomination. Burke claimed that Jackson won the Democratic nomination due to it being packed with Republicans. He defeated Burke, running as an independent, in the general election after the two participated in a debate hosted by the League of Women Voters. Burke backed a group of successful anti-Jackson candidates in the 1930 elections, including one elected to the board of aldermen. In 1931, Jackson lost the Democratic nomination to Burke, but won the election as the nominee of the People and Republican parties. Jackson declined to run for reelection in 1933 and endorsed Burke, who won. The Republicans wanted Jackson to run for mayor in 1935, but he declined to do so and supported Burke again.

=== Tenure ===
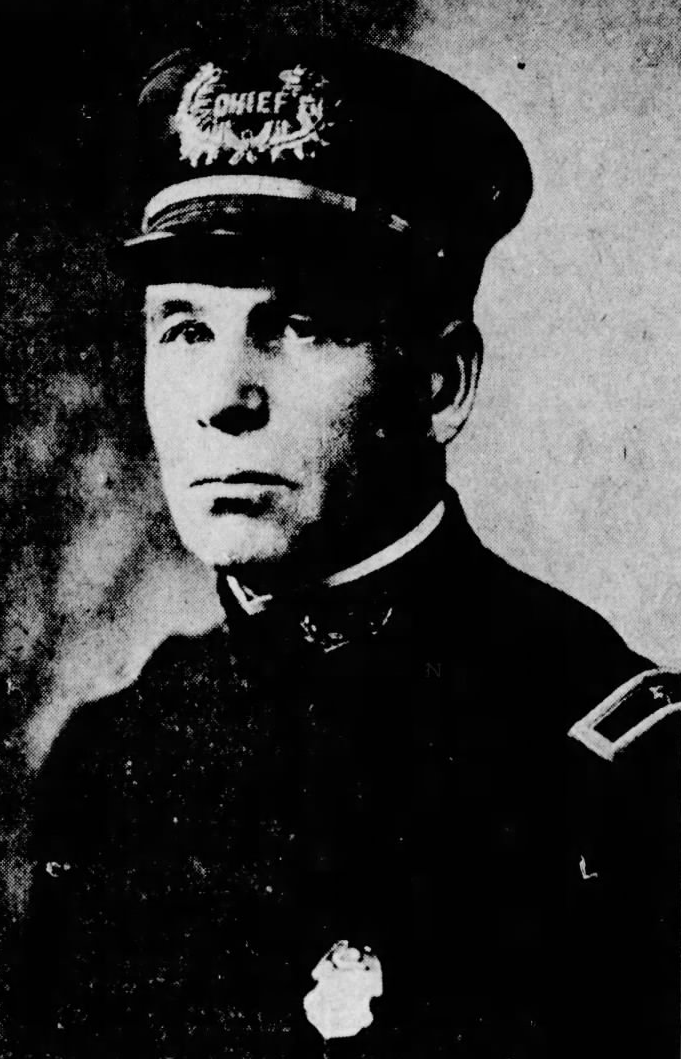
Chief of Police Patrick J. Russell (pictured) died in 1931, and Holmes appointed Patrick J. Cosgrove to replace him.

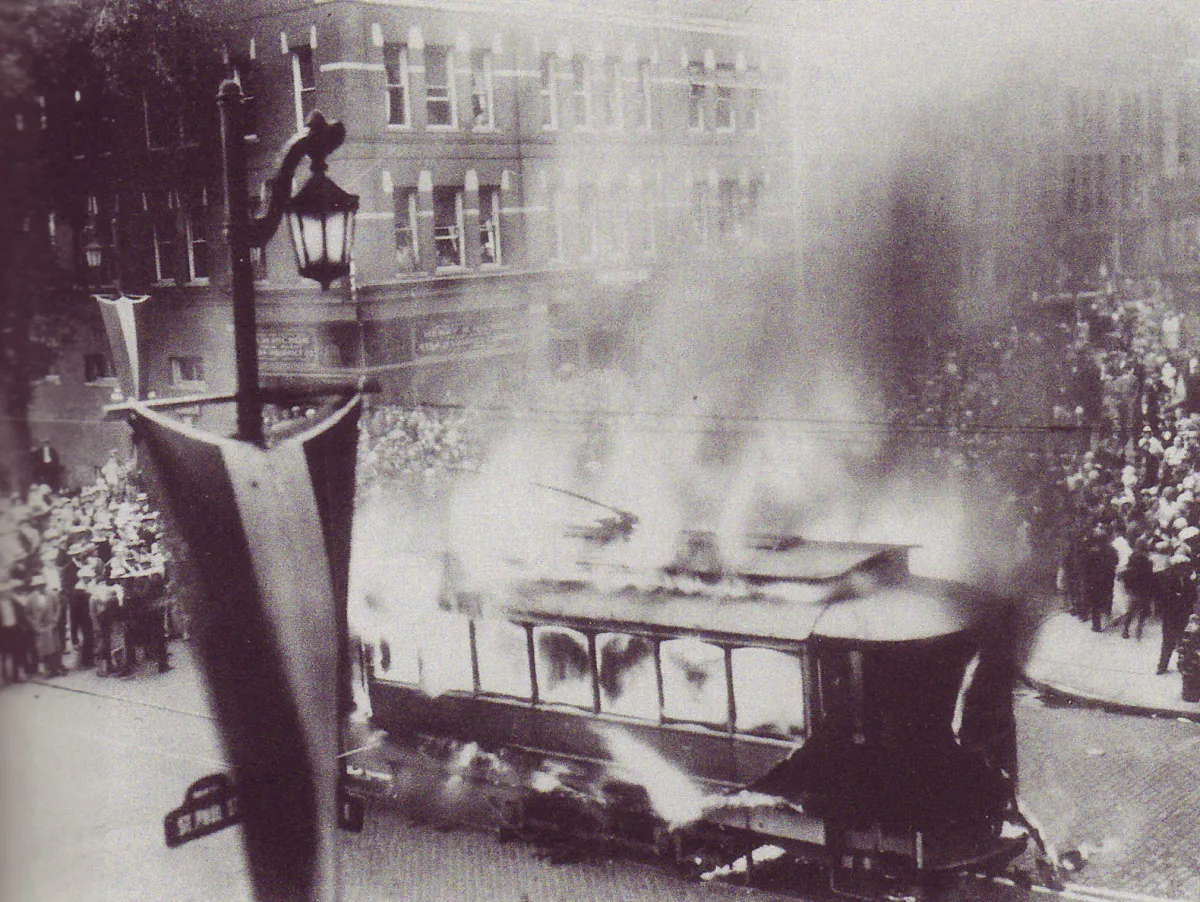
Burlington's trolley system ended in 1929, and a trolley car was ceremonially burned on August 4.

During the Spanish flu outbreak Jackson opened a dispensary in city hall to sell whisky for medical use. The city started distributing 1,200 loaves of bread per week in 1932 in response to the Great Depression. A report on November 1, 1932, showed that 563 families, including 1,421 children, were reliant on the city's charity department. The charity department's expenses rose from $20,982.51 in 1923, to $34,151.06 in 1928, and $101,460.83 in 1932.

Jackson created the position of police matron within the police department with the purpose of providing assistance to women and investigating housing conditions, but this not have the power to arrest anybody. He appointed Edith McCully, but she resigned on October 22, 1917, and the position was vacant until N.E.L. Austin was appointed on June 1, 1918. She held the position for 21 years and became the city's first female police officer in 1920. Patrick J. Russell, the chief of police since 1903, died on July 29, 1931, and Patrick J. Cosgrove was appointed to replace him on September 12.

Prior to 1922, garbage in the city was collected by seven men with teams on eight routes. The system was reformed and expanded so that four men, with a wagon of their own that contained a zinc-lined box, collected garbage in the city that was now divided into four sections. The garbage was dumped at the University of Vermont's farm. The mayoral salary was raised from $500 per year to $1,500 per year in 1918. The fire department was motorized during Jackson's tenure. The city's trolley system, which was formed in 1885, was transformed into a bus system in 1929, and a trolley car was ceremonially burned on August 4.

== State politics ==
Jackson defeated Republican nominee Levi P. Smith for a seat in the Vermont House of Representatives representing Burlington in 1920, and served one term. He was chair of the suffrage and elections committee. He received the Democratic gubernatorial nomination in 1922, with Harry C. Shurtleff as lieutenant governor, but he was defeated by Republican nominee Redfield Proctor Jr.. The Democratic lieutenant gubernatorial nomination was given to Jackson in 1930, but he lost to Republican nominee Benjamin Williams in the general election.

The 1920 Vermont Democratic Convention, where Jackson served as a delegate, selected him as one of the delegates to the national convention. Jackson was the chair of the Democratic delegation while his brother Horatio Nelson Jackson was chair of the delegation to the Republican National Convention. Charles L. Woodbury, president of the board of aldermen, served as acting mayor while Jackson was at the convention.

Seven of Vermont's eight delegates to the 1924 Democratic National Convention were selected without opposition.

Jackson defeated J.P. Kelly to become a delegate to the 1924 state convention. However, Jackson returned to Burlington during the convention to resume his duties as mayor and was replaced by alternate delegate George R. Stackpole. Arthur H. Gleason, another member of Vermont's delegation, voted for Jackson on the 39th presidential nomination ballot.

During the 1928 presidential election Jackson was a delegate to the state convention, vice-chair of Al Smith for President Club in Chittenden county, and chair of Smith for President club in Burlington. Jackson and his wife were delegates to the 1932 state convention, and his wife attended the national convention as a delegate with 1/2 a vote. The 1936 state convention, where Jackson served as a delegate, elected him as a delegate to the national convention, but he was replaced by alternate delegate Fred C. Martin due to Jackson being sick.

== Later life ==
Jackson was appointed director of the Federal Housing Administration in Vermont in 1934, and held that position until his death, succeeded by Frederick C. Hinchey. During World War II, Jackson, James J. Carney, and Phillips M. Bell were appointed by Governor William Wills to serve as Burlington's rationing board. Jackson died on December 15, 1944, at the Bishop DeGoesbriand Hospital and was buried at the Lakeview Cemetery.

== Personal life ==
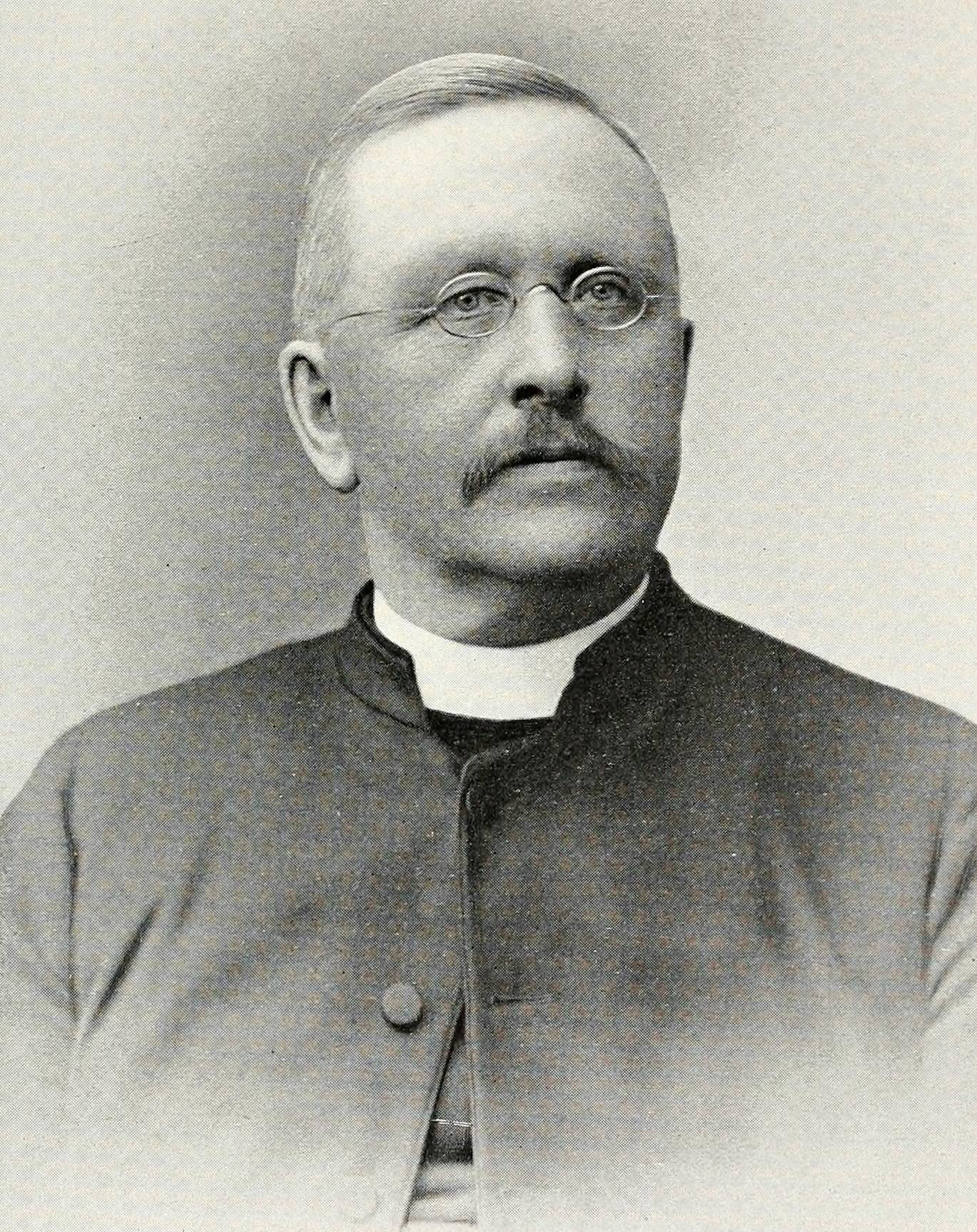
Samuel Nelson Jackson, the father of John Holmes Jackson

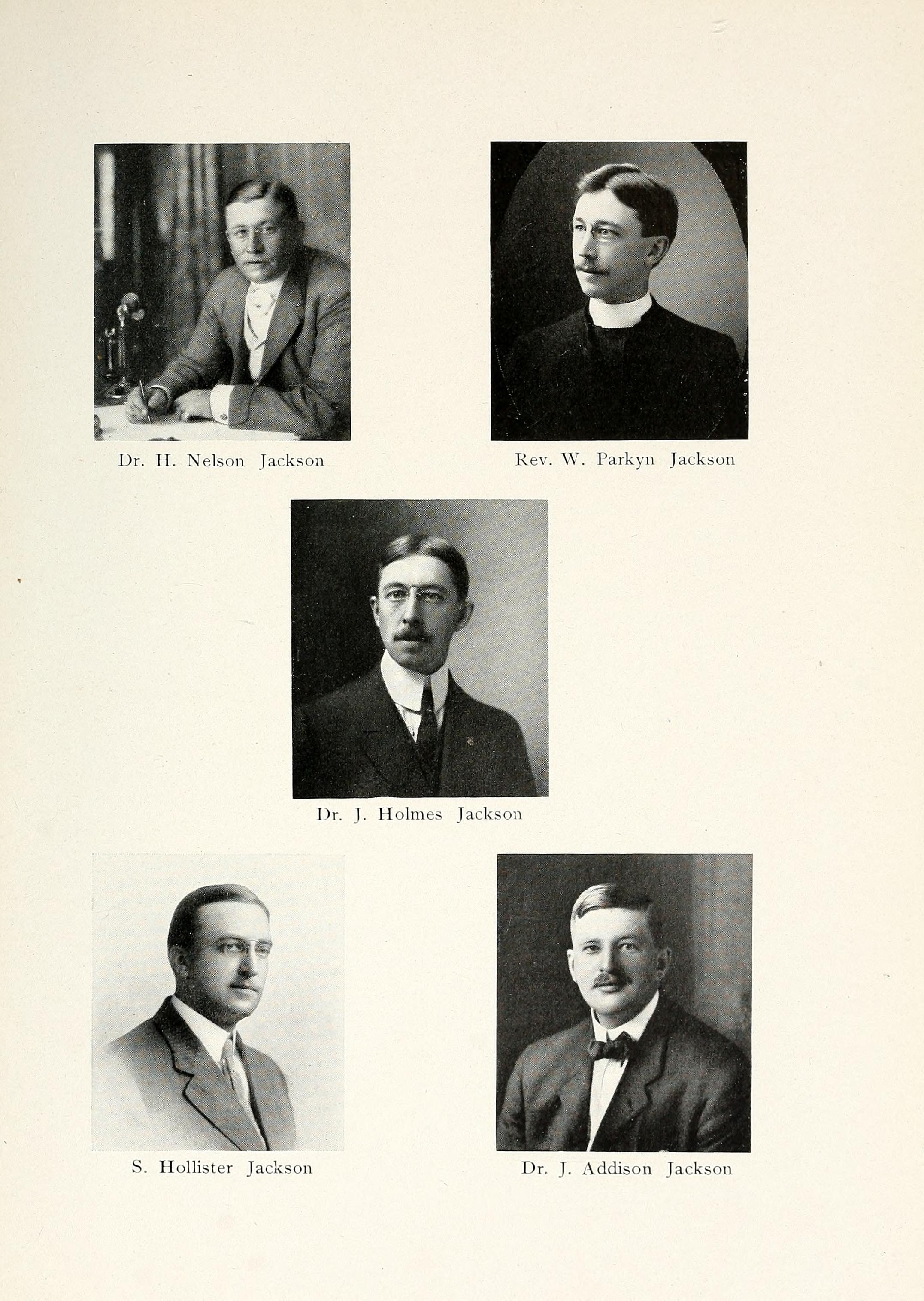
John Holmes Jackson and his four brothers

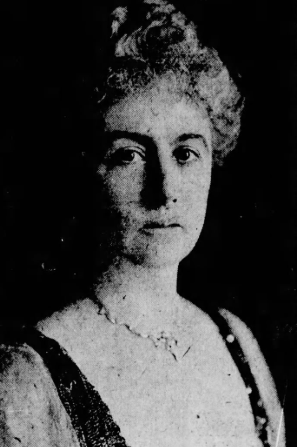
Caroline Deming Smalley

Samuel Hollister Jackson, Jackson's brother, became the lieutenant governor of Vermont and died during the Great Vermont Flood of 1927; his other brother Horatio Nelson Jackson was the first person to cross the United States in a car. His cousin, Herbert A. Parkyn, was a leader in the New Thought movement and the founder of the Chicago School of Psychology.

Jackson married Caroline Deming Smalley, with whom he had one child, on June 4, 1901. Caroline was the daughter of Bradley Smalley, a member of the Democratic National Committee, and granddaughter of David Allen Smalley. After his death, the couple donated land that formerly belonged to Caroline's father to become a park in Burlington. During Jackson's career as mayor he appointed Caroline to the library board of commissioners.

Jackson was put on trial in 1894 for interfering with an officer while he was beating a criminal and was found not guilty. He was one of 373 people in Vermont and one of 43 in Burlington to own a registered car in 1905.

== Electoral history ==
1913 Burlington, Vermont School Commission 6th Ward election
Party	Candidate	Votes	%
Democratic	John W. Coffey	184	43.40%
Republican	Roy L. Patrick	152	35.85%
Progressive	John Holmes Jackson	88	20.75%
Total votes		424	100.00%

1917 Burlington, Vermont mayoral election
Party	Candidate	Votes	%
Democratic	John Holmes Jackson	1,416	50.11%
Republican	Albert S. Drew (incumbent)	1,410	49.89%
Total votes		2,826	100.00%

1919 Burlington, Vermont mayoral election
Party	Candidate	Votes	%
Democratic	John Holmes Jackson (incumbent)	2,149	52.68%
Republican	Harris R. Watkins	1,930	47.32%
Total votes		4,079	100.00%

1920 Vermont House of Representatives election
Party	Candidate	Votes	%
Democratic	John Holmes Jackson (incumbent)	3,009	50.62%
Republican	Levi P. Smith	2,935	49.38%
Total votes		5,944	100.00%

1921 Burlington, Vermont mayoral election
Party	Candidate	Votes	%
Democratic	John Holmes Jackson (incumbent)	1,941	56.80%
Republican	William B. McKillip	1,476	43.20%
Total votes		3,417	100.00%

1922 Vermont gubernatorial election
Primary election
Party	Candidate	Votes	%
Democratic	John Holmes Jackson	2,961	99.20%
Write-in		24	0.80%
Total votes		2,985	100.00%
General election
Republican	Redfield Proctor Jr.	49,161	71.97%
Prohibition	Redfield Proctor Jr.	1,943	2.84%
Total	Redfield Proctor Jr.	51,104	74.82%
Democratic	John Holmes Jackson	17,059	24.97%
Write-in		144	0.21%
Total votes		68,307	100.00%

1929 Burlington, Vermont mayoral election
Primary election
Party	Candidate	Votes	%
Democratic	John Holmes Jackson	162	52.09%
Democratic	James Edmund Burke	149	47.91%
Total votes		311	100.00%
General election
Democratic	John Holmes Jackson		
Republican	John Holmes Jackson		
Total	John Holmes Jackson	3,426	59.27%
Independent	James Edmund Burke	2,354	40.73%
Total votes		5,780	100.00%

1930 Vermont gubernatorial election
Primary election
Party	Candidate	Votes	%
Democratic	John Holmes Jackson	1,720	99.88%
Write-in		2	0.12%
Total votes		1,722	100.00%
General election
Republican	Benjamin Williams	49,635	69.97%
Democratic	John Holmes Jackson	21,301	30.03%
Write-in		1	0.00%
Total votes		70,937	100.00%

1931 Burlington, Vermont mayoral election
Primary election
Party	Candidate	Votes	%
Democratic	James Edmund Burke	403	51.21%
Democratic	John Holmes Jackson (incumbent)	384	48.79%
Total votes		787	100.00%
General election
People's	John Holmes Jackson (incumbent)		
Republican	John Holmes Jackson (incumbent)		
Total	John Holmes Jackson (incumbent)	3,743	53.75%
Democratic	James Edmund Burke	3,066	44.03%
Independent	Ernest A. Limoge	155	2.23%
Total votes		6,964	100.00%

== Board of Aldermen ==
Composition of the Board of Aldermen (Note: Each ward has two aldermen elected from it)
Year	President	Ward 1		Ward 2		Ward 3	
1917	Eugene A. Luck	C.L. Woodbury	Roy Lamson	Eugene A. Luck	George J. Gratton	Charles Caise	Edward B. Bessette
1918	Eugene A. Luck	C.L. Woodbury	George D. McBride	Eugene A. Luck	F.A. Deyette	Charles Caise	Edward B. Bessette
1919	C.L. Woodbury	C.L. Woodbury	George D. McBride	Clarence H. Beecher	F.A. Deyette	Charles Caise	Edward B. Bessette
1920	C.L. Woodbury	C.L. Woodbury	George D. McBride	Clarence H. Beecher	F.A. Deyette	Charles Caise	J.E. Larocque
1921	Roy L. Patrick	W.H. Crockett	George D. McBride	Michael Frank	F.A. Deyette	John B. Lambert (Note: Elected with the Citizen's nomination)	J.E. Larocque
1922	Roy L. Patrick	W.H. Crockett	H.A. Richardson (Note: Died on August 16, 1922)	Michael Frank	Clarence H. Beecher	John B. Lambert	Charles Caise
1923	Clarence H. Beecher	W.H. Crockett	George L. Edwards (Note: Elected in special election on September 14, 1922, to fill vacancy created by H.A. Richardson's death.)	Barnet Frank	Clarence H. Beecher	B.A. Altieri	Charles Caise
1924	George L. Edwards	W.H. Crockett	George L. Edwards	Barnet Frank	Ralph H. Robinson	B.A. Altieri	Charles Caise
1929	Harry C. Wheelock	D.H. Cameron	Sedgwick A. Rand	Frank H. Brown	J. W. Stevens	William Delorme	William Thynne (Note: Reelected in 1930 as the nominee of the Citizen's Party against Republican and Democratic opponents.)
1930	Harry C. Wheelock	D.H. Cameron	Sedgwick A. Rand	Frank H. Brown	J. W. Stevens	William Delorme	William Thynne
1931	Harry C. Wheelock	D.W. Doane	Sedgwick A. Rand	Merton W. Preston	J. W. Stevens	Charles Caise	William Thynne
1932	F.W. Shepardson	D.W. Doane	Roswell Bromley	Merton W. Preston	John J. Burns	Charles Caise	Ernest A. Limoge
Year	President	Ward 4		Ward 5		Ward 6	
1917	Eugene A. Luck	Victor A. Bergeron	Harold F. Wakefield	F.W. Baylies	Arthur G. Mansur	J. Lindley Hall	Charles L. Dolan
1918	Eugene A. Luck	Victor A. Bergeron	Frank Dwyer	Jed P. Ladd	Arthur G. Mansur	J. Lindley Hall	Charles L. Dolan
1919	C.L. Woodbury	Victor A. Bergeron	Frank Dwyer	Jed P. Ladd	Edward Hanbridge	J. Lindley Hall	Roy L. Patrick
1920	C.L. Woodbury	Edward H. McGrath	Frank Dwyer	E.O. Mitiguy	Edward Hanbridge	William H. Wilson	Roy L. Patrick
1921	Roy L. Patrick	Edward H. McGrath	Frank Dwyer	E.O. Mitiguy	Edward Hanbridge	William H. Wilson	Roy L. Patrick
1922	Roy L. Patrick	Edward H. McGrath	Frank Dwyer	Lewis G. Irwin	Edward Hanbridge	William H. Wilson	Roy L. Patrick
1923	Clarence H. Beecher	Edward H. McGrath	Joseph E. Moore	Lewis G. Irwin	D.L. Sanders	William H. Wilson	Lyman P. Wood
1924	George L. Edwards	Edward H. McGrath	Joseph E. Moore	Lewis G. Irwin	D.L. Sanders	R.L. Soule	Lyman P. Wood
1929	Harry C. Wheelock	Charles Ables (Note: Elected in 1929 as the nominee of the Citizen's Party. Resigned on April 21, 1932, and was replaced by Francis D. Foley)	Hugh L. Finnegan	Frank S. Lanou	Harry C. Wheelock	F.W. Shepardson	Ben B. Lane
1930	Harry C. Wheelock	Charles Ables	Hugh L. Finnegan	Frank S. Lanou	Harry C. Wheelock	F.W. Shepardson	John H. Patrick
1931	Harry C. Wheelock	Charles Ables	Hugh L. Finnegan	Frank S. Lanou	Harry C. Wheelock	F.W. Shepardson	John H. Patrick
1932	F.W. Shepardson	Charles Ables	Hugh L. Finnegan	Frank S. Lanou	Louis F. Dow	F.W. Shepardson	Ethan V. Howard

== Works cited ==
=== Books ===
- Fifty-Ninth Annual Report of the City of Burlington, Vermont. Burlington, Vermont. 1923.
- Fifty-Sixth Annual Report of the City of Burlington, Vermont. Burlington, Vermont. 1920.
- Sixty-eighth Annual Report of the City of Burlington, Vermont. Burlington, Vermont. 1932.
- Beerworth, Jeffrey (2015). Historic Crimes and Justice in Burlington, Vermont. The History Press. ISBN 9781467118408.
- Jackson, Samuel (1911). A Branch of the Jackson and Correlated Families: 1730-1911. Bartlett-Orr Press.

=== Newspapers ===
- "105 Delegates Are Chosen By Democrats Here". Burlington Daily News. May 10, 1932. p. 6 – via Newspapers.com.
- "1200 Loaves of Bread Per Week Issued In City". Burlington Daily News. September 17, 1932. p. 3 – via Newspapers.com.
- "12 Nominated". St. Albans Messenger. May 18, 1932. p. 1 – via Newspapers.com.
- "Acting Mayor". Burlington Daily News. June 22, 1920. p. 3 – via Newspapers.com.
- "Additional Executive Appointments". St. Johnsbury Republican. December 7, 1904. p. 4 – via Newspapers.com.
- "Arthur H. Gleason". The Caledonian-Record. July 12, 1924. p. 4 – via Newspapers.com.
- "Automobiles in Vermont". The Burlington Free Press. July 19, 1905. p. 6 – via Newspapers.com.
- "Barre Enterprise". The Burlington Free Press. April 27, 1899. p. 19 – via Newspapers.com.
- "Big Boost In Salaries Ordered". The Burlington Free Press. June 11, 1918. p. 8 – via Newspapers.com.
- "Big Vote Is Expected at City Election". The Burlington Free Press. February 19, 1931. p. 9 – via Newspapers.com.
- "Both Parties Name Jackson". Brattleboro Reformer. February 13, 1929. p. 5 – via Newspapers.com.
- "Burke Wins Mayoralty By Majority of 658". The Burlington Free Press. March 8, 1933. p. 8 – via Newspapers.com.
- "Burlington Again In No-License Column". Burlington Weekly Free Press. March 7, 1918. p. 12 – via Newspapers.com.
- "Burlington City Election Results". Burlington Daily News. March 5, 1913. p. 3 – via Newspapers.com.
- "Burlington City Government Organizes For Sixty-Fifth Year". The Burlington Free Press. April 2, 1929. p. 8 – via Newspapers.com.
- "Burlington Recipient of Magnificent Gift". Rutland Herald. April 24, 1920. p. 1 – via Newspapers.com.
- "Burlington Sells Whiskey". St. Albans Messenger. October 19, 1918. p. 2 – via Newspapers.com.
- "City Begins Garbage Collection June 1". The Burlington Free Press. May 31, 1922. p. 8 – via Newspapers.com.
- "City Election Tame Affair This Year". The Burlington Free Press. March 5, 1924. p. 8 – via Newspapers.com.
- "City Government Organizes For 1917". Burlington Weekly Free Press. April 5, 1917. p. 9 – via Newspapers.com.
- "City Government Organizes For 1918". The Burlington Free Press. April 2, 1918. p. 6 – via Newspapers.com.
- "Collecting of Garbage". The Burlington Free Press. May 6, 1922. p. 7 – via Newspapers.com.
- "Committee Report on Garbage Collection". The Burlington Free Press. March 9, 1922. p. 6 – via Newspapers.com.
- "Delegates Chosen To State Conventions". The Burlington Free Press. May 12, 1924. p. 8 – via Newspapers.com.
- "Delegation Heads". Grand Isle Star. June 10, 1920. p. 2 – via Newspapers.com.
- "Democratic Caucus A Harmonious Affair". The Burlington Free Press. May 7, 1928. p. 7 – via Newspapers.com.
- "Democrats Choose Park Pollard For Governor; J. Holmes Jackson Lieutenant Governor". The Burlington Free Press. June 25, 1930. p. 3 – via Newspapers.com.
- "Democratic Delegates". The Burlington Free Press. May 28, 1920. p. 7 – via Newspapers.com.
- "Democrats Name Mayor J.E. Burke". The Burlington Free Press. February 16, 1935. p. 11 – via Newspapers.com.
- "Democrats Name Jackson Again". The Burlington Free Press. February 5, 1925. p. 8 – via Newspapers.com.
- "Democrats Name Their Delegates". The Burlington Free Press. May 5, 1936. p. 10 – via Newspapers.com.
- "Democrats Take Preliminary Steps For Forming Al Smith Club". The Burlington Free Press. August 18, 1928. p. 10 – via Newspapers.com.
- "Democrats Win The Election". The Burlington Free Press. March 7, 1917. p. 9 – via Newspapers.com.
- "Dental Meeting Closed". The Burlington Free Press. March 18, 1899. p. 5 – via Newspapers.com.
- "Dr. Clarence H. Beecher Mayor-Elect of Burlington". The Burlington Free Press. May 4, 1925. p. 8 – via Newspapers.com.
- "Dr. J. Holmes Jackson, 73, Dies; Was Mayor of This City 12 Years". The Burlington Free Press. December 16, 1944. p. 9. Archived from the original on May 12, 2019 – via Newspapers.com.
- "Dr. Jackson Wins Nomination". Barre Daily Times. February 7, 1929. p. 1 – via Newspapers.com.
- "Economy Necessary In Conduct of City Affairs This Year". The Burlington Free Press. April 8, 1919. p. 6 – via Newspapers.com.
- "Elect Jackson Chairman of Al Smith Club". Burlington Daily News. September 10, 1928. p. 3 – via Newspapers.com.
- "Elect Jackson Mayor of Burlington, Again". Rutland Herald. March 7, 1923. p. 2 – via Newspapers.com.
- "F.C. Hinchey In New Post". Rutland Herald. December 22, 1944. p. 7 – via Newspapers.com.
- "Finnegan And Heininger Win In Ward 4; Patrick In Ward 6". The Burlington Free Press. March 5, 1930. p. 8 – via Newspapers.com.
- "George Stackpole". The Burlington Free Press. July 9, 1924. p. 16 – via Newspapers.com.
- "G.O.P. Leaders Want Dr. Jackson". The Burlington Free Press. January 22, 1935. p. 10 – via Newspapers.com.
- "H.A. Richardson At Death's Door In Auto Crash". Burlington Daily News. August 16, 1922. p. 1 – via Newspapers.com.
- "H.C. Wheelock Again President of Board". The Burlington Free Press. April 8, 1930. p. 8 – via Newspapers.com.
- "Insurgents Take Burlington Votes". Rutland Herald. March 5, 1930. p. 10 – via Newspapers.com.
- "J.H. Jackson Named". The Burlington Free Press. February 16, 1917. p. 7 – via Newspapers.com.
- "J. Holmes Jackson Is Re-Elected Mayor of City Over James Burke". Burlington Daily News. March 4, 1931. p. 1 – via Newspapers.com.
- "Jackson Again Elected Mayor". Burlington Daily News. March 3, 1921. p. 3. Archived from the original on December 4, 2019 – via Newspapers.com.
- "Jackson Beats Drew By Narrow Margin of 10". Burlington Daily News. March 7, 1917. p. 1 – via Newspapers.com.
- "Jackson Holds Full Approval Of Republicans". Burlington Daily News. February 17, 1931. p. 3 – via Newspapers.com.
- "Jackson Is Re-elected Mayor of Burlington". The Burlington Free Press. March 4, 1931. p. 10 – via Newspapers.com.
- "Jackson Overwhelms Burke In Mayoral Contest". The Burlington Free Press. March 6, 1929. p. 10 – via Newspapers.com.
- "Jackson Promises No Increase In Taxes If Elected Mayor". The Burlington Free Press. March 2, 1929. p. 10 – via Newspapers.com.
- "Jackson Says He Will Support Burke for Mayor". The Burlington Free Press. February 18, 1933. p. 9. Archived from the original on May 16, 2019 – via Newspapers.com.
- "James E. Burke Holds Rally As An Independent". Burlington Daily News. February 16, 1929. p. 2 – via Newspapers.com.
- "James E. Burke Wins Mayoralty Nomination By A 19 Vote Margin". Burlington Daily News. February 13, 1931. p. 12 – via Newspapers.com.
- "John Holmes Jackson Trial". The Vermont Watchman. November 21, 1894. p. 4 – via Newspapers.com.
- "Legislature Gets Down To Business; 20 Bills Appear". The Burlington Free Press. January 12, 1921. p. 1 – via Newspapers.com.
- "Little Opposition Indicates Discontinuance of Trolleys". The Burlington Free Press. May 21, 1929. p. 3 – via Newspapers.com.
- "Many Nominations Made". The Burlington Free Press. February 18, 1913. p. 8 – via Newspapers.com.
- "Mayor Appoints Commissioners". The Burlington Free Press. April 2, 1929. p. 8. Archived from the original on May 14, 2019 – via Newspapers.com.
- "Mayor Jackson Declines Nomination". The Burlington Free Press. February 9, 1925. p. 7 – via Newspapers.com.
- "Mayor Jackson Gets One Vermont Vote". The Burlington Free Press. July 3, 1924. p. 1 – via Newspapers.com.
- "Mayor Jackson Is Re-Elected". Burlington Daily News. March 8, 1923. p. 3 – via Newspapers.com.
- "Mayor Jackson Re-Elected by 219 Majority". Burlington Daily News. March 5, 1919. p. 5. Archived from the original on December 4, 2019 – via Newspapers.com.
- "Mayor Jackson Urges Strict Supervision of Department Expenses". Burlington Daily News. April 5, 1921. p. 3 – via Newspapers.com.
- "Mayor Jackson Wins Contest". Brattleboro Reformer. May 21, 1924. p. 5 – via Newspapers.com.
- "Mayor Sees No Improvement In Labor Situation". The Burlington Free Press. November 17, 1932. p. 8 – via Newspapers.com.
- "Mayor Wants Street Lighting Paid by City Light Dept. Earnings". Burlington Daily News. April 7, 1931. p. 3 – via Newspapers.com.
- "Miss Caroline Smalley Married to Dr. J. Holmes Jackson". Rutland Herald. June 5, 1901. p. 6 – via Newspapers.com.
- "Motorcycles For Police Department". The Burlington Free Press. April 7, 1925. p. 9 – via Newspapers.com.
- "Mrs. Mary H. Parkyn Jackson". The Burlington Free Press. October 5, 1916. p. 8 – via Newspapers.com.
- "National Democratic Committeeman Bradley B. Smalley of Burlington Celebrates His 71st Birthday". Rutland Herald. December 4, 1906. p. 7 – via Newspapers.com.
- "New City Government". The Burlington Free Press. April 4, 1922. p. 7 – via Newspapers.com.
- "Pack". St. Albans Messenger. February 8, 1929. p. 4 – via Newspapers.com.
- "Patrick J. Cosgrove Appointed Chief of Police, Succeeding Late Patrick J. Russell". The Burlington Free Press. September 14, 1931. p. 6 – via Newspapers.com.
- "Progressive Delegates". The Burlington Free Press. September 14, 1914. p. 8 – via Newspapers.com.
- "Rationing Board Now Has Say On Typewriters". The Burlington Free Press. April 22, 1942. p. 6. Archived from the original on May 16, 2019 – via Newspapers.com.
- "Republicans Endorse Jackson As Candidate For Mayorship". Burlington Daily News. February 20, 1923. p. 3 – via Newspapers.com.
- "Republicans Indorse Dr. Jackson for Mayor". Rutland Herald. February 19, 1923. p. 2 – via Newspapers.com.
- "Special Election". The Burlington Free Press. September 15, 1922. p. 16 – via Newspapers.com.
- "State Democrats Ready For Parley". Rutland Herald. June 18, 1936. p. 7. Archived from the original on May 16, 2019 – via Newspapers.com.
- "The Rev. S.N. Jackson". The Burlington Free Press. June 30, 1913. p. 8 – via Newspapers.com.
- "The Ward Tickets". The Burlington Free Press. March 3, 1920. p. 8 – via Newspapers.com.
- "The Voting By Wards". The Burlington Free Press. March 8, 1922. p. 8 – via Newspapers.com.
- "Thynne Beats Caise In Ward Three; K. of C. Tax Exemption Proposal Defeated". The Burlington Free Press. March 7, 1928. p. 1 – via Newspapers.com.
- "Tire Rationing Board Issues Four Permits; To Meet Twice a Week". The Burlington Free Press. January 12, 1942. p. 12. Archived from the original on May 16, 2019 – via Newspapers.com.
- "Up, Up, Up To More Than One Tenth Of Million". The Burlington Free Press. February 17, 1933. p. 10 – via Newspapers.com.
- "Vermont Democrats Do Not Instruct". Barre Daily Times. June 3, 1920. p. 1 – via Newspapers.com.
- "Vermont Democrats Select Candidates". The Burlington Free Press. June 22, 1922. p. 7 – via Newspapers.com.
- "Vote for Aldermen". Burlington Daily News. March 8, 1916. p. 5 – via Newspapers.com.
- "Vote In Burlington". The Burlington Free Press. November 3, 1920. p. 9 – via Newspapers.com.
- "Voters Reject Zoning Article At City Polls". Burlington Daily News. March 2, 1932. p. 3 – via Newspapers.com.
- "VT. Delegates Awaiting Call". Burlington Daily News. June 24, 1936. p. 3 – via Newspapers.com.
- "Want Ban Placed On Imported Carnivals". The Burlington Free Press. April 8, 1924. p. 9 – via Newspapers.com.
- "Ward Elections". Burlington Daily News. March 3, 1921. p. 3 – via Newspapers.com.
- "Ward Officers". Burlington Daily News. March 5, 1919. p. 5 – via Newspapers.com.
- "Women Voters Hear Mayoral Candidates". Burlington Daily News. February 28, 1929. p. 2 – via Newspapers.com.

=== Websites ===
- "1922 Governor Democratic Primary". Secretary of State of Vermont. Archived from the original on February 10, 2025.
- "1922 Governor General Election". Secretary of State of Vermont. Archived from the original on February 10, 2025.
- "1930 Lieutenant Governor Democratic Primary". Secretary of State of Vermont. Archived from the original on February 16, 2025.
- "1930 Lieutenant Governor General Election". Secretary of State of Vermont. Archived from the original on February 16, 2025.
- Bushnell, Mark (February 18, 2024). "Then Again: Vermont's love affair with the trolley". VTDigger. Archived from the original on February 15, 2025.
- Ostermeier, Eric (April 30, 2015). "Bernie Sanders Becomes 5th Presidential Candidate in Vermont History". Smart Politics. Archived from the original on January 30, 2019.

Party political offices
Preceded by Fred C. Martin	Democratic nominee for Governor of Vermont; 1922	Succeeded by Fred C. Martin
Preceded by John W. Sheehey	Democratic nominee for Lieutenant Governor of Vermont; 1930	Succeeded by Harry W. Witters
