= William Baxter (American politician) =

American politician (1778–1827)

Assistant Judge of Orleans County, Vermont
- In office 1825–1827 Serving with Samuel C. Crafts
- Preceded by: Nathaniel P. Sawyer, John Ide
- Succeeded by: William Howe

Member of the Vermont House of Representatives
- In office 1826–1827
- Preceded by: Jasper Robinson
- Succeeded by: Jasper Robinson
- In office 1824–1825
- Preceded by: None (no selection)
- Succeeded by: Jasper Robinson
- In office 1819–1822
- Preceded by: None (no selection)
- Succeeded by: None (no selection)
- In office 1806–1818
- Preceded by: Luke Gilbert
- Succeeded by: None (no selection)
- In office 1802–1803
- Preceded by: None (no selection)
- Succeeded by: Elijah Strong
- Constituency: Brownington

State's Attorney of Orleans County, Vermont
- In office 1802–1815
- Preceded by: Joseph C. Bradley
- Succeeded by: David M. Camp

Personal details
- Born: August 3, 1778 Norwich, Vermont Republic
- Died: October 1, 1827 (aged 49) Brownington, Vermont, U.S.
- Resting place: Brownington Village Cemetery, Brownington, Vermont, U.S.
- Party: Federalist
- Spouse: Lydia Ashley
- Children: 8 (including Portus Baxter and Carlos Baxter)
- Relatives: Jedediah Hyde Baxter (grandson)
- Occupation: Attorney

William Baxter (August 3, 1778 – October 1, 1827) was an American lawyer and politician who served as the state's attorney for Orleans County, Vermont, from 1802 to 1815, and in the Vermont House of Representatives on several non-consecutive occasions between 1802 and 1827.

Born in Norwich, Vermont, Baxter was the second person admitted to the bar in Orleans County. He held multiple elected offices and paid for the construction of a school in Orleans County. He fathered Portus Baxter and Carlos Baxter before dying with an estate worth $100,000.

== Early life ==
The Baxter family came from Norwich, England, to Norwich, Connecticut, in 1632. Members of the family moved to Norwich, Vermont, in 1777, including Elihu Baxter and his wife Triphena Taylor. William Baxter, the oldest of the couple's 15 children, was born in Norwich, on August 3, 1778. On April 17, 1799, he married Lydia Ashley. They were the parents of eight children, including Portus Baxter and Carlos Baxter.

== Career ==
Baxter studied law under Daniel Buck. On November 23, 1801, he was the second person admitted to the bar of Orleans County, Vermont. Moving to Brownington, Vermont, in 1801, he earned around $4,000 per year. In 1814, he was among a group asking the state legislature for a turnpike between Sutton and Brownington. In 1822, he formed a legal partnership with George Carlton West.

Active in politics as a Federalist, Baxter was the state's attorney of Orleans County from 1802 to 1815, one of the county's assistant judges from 1825 to 1827, and a justice of the peace. He represented Brownington in the Vermont House of Representatives in 1802 to 1803, 1806 to 1818, 1819 to 1822, 1824 to 1825, and 1826 to 1827, and as a delegate to the 1822 constitutional convention.

In 1812, Baxter was a member of a four-person committee to determine if Montpelier, Vermont, should remain the capital, but the committee made no decision and referred the issue to be discussed again during the next legislative session. He proposed legislation to create a new school in Orleans County in 1820 and personally paid for its construction under the condition that the second floor be used for religious worship until the space was needed for use by the grammar school. The second floor was used for religious worship until the construction of a church in 1841.

Titus Hutchinson, Calvin Yale, William Nutting, and Baxter were elected to the board of trustees of the University of Vermont in 1819. Ira H. Allen was appointed to replace Baxter on the board of trustees after his death.

== Death ==
Baxter died in Brownington on October 1, 1827, and was buried at Brownington Village Cemetery. At the time of Baxter's death he had an estate worth $100,000 (equivalent to $2,845,588 in 2025), and West was left to administer it.

== Works cited ==
=== Books ===
- The History of Orleans County, Vermont: Civil, Ecclesiastical, Biographical and Military (PDF). White River Paper. 1882.
- Baldwin, Frederick (1886). Biography of the Bar of Orleans County, Vermont. Vermont Watchman and State Journal Press.
- Thompson, Zadock (1823). Walton's Vermont Register and Farmer's Almanack. E.P. Walton.
- Comstock, John, ed. (1918). A List of the Principal Civil Officers of Vermont From 1777 to 1918. St. Albans Messenger.
- Walton, Eliakim P., ed. (1877). Records of the Governor and Council of the State of Vermont. Vol. 5. Montpelier, Vermont: J. & J. M. Poland.
- Walton, Eliakim P., ed. (1878). Records of the Governor and Council of the State of Vermont. Vol. 6. Montpelier, Vermont: J. & J. M. Poland.
- Walton, Eliakim P., ed. (1879). Records of the Governor and Council of the State of Vermont. Vol. 7. Montpelier, Vermont: J. & J. M. Poland.

=== News ===
- "Trustee". Burlington Weekly Free Press. November 30, 1827. p. 1 – via Newspapers.com.
- Kuchle, Spencer (September 1, 2023). "History's pull: the Orleans County Grammar School's bicentennial". The North Star Monthly. Archived from the original on March 29, 2025.
- "Died: William Baxter". Danville, Vermont. North Star. October 9, 1827. p. 3 – via Newspapers.com.

=== Web ===
- Boyko, Janice (2024). "Brownington Village Cemetery". NEKG-VT.com. Simsbury, Connecticut: Northeast Kingdom Genealogy.
