= Carlos Baxter =

American politician (1809–1874)

Member of the Vermont House of Representatives from Burlington, Vermont
- In office 1839–1841
- Preceded by: Harry Bradley
- Succeeded by: William A. Griswold
- Constituency: Burlington, Vermont

Personal details
- Born: January 15, 1809 Brownington, Vermont, U.S.
- Died: January 28, 1874 (aged 65) Burlington, Vermont, U.S.
- Party: Whig; Republican
- Spouse: Cornelia Deming
- Children: 5
- Parent: William Baxter (father)
- Relatives: Portus Baxter (brother); Jedediah Hyde Baxter (nephew); Benjamin F. Deming (father-in-law); Bradley Smalley (son-in-law)
- Education: Norwich University; Union College (BA)

Carlos Baxter (January 15, 1809 – January 28, 1874) was an American politician who served in the Vermont House of Representatives from 1839 to 1841, as a Whig. He served as a collector of internal revenue from 1862 to 1867.

Born in Brownington, Vermont, Baxter's father served in the state house and his brother, Portus Baxter, later served in the United States House of Representatives. He was educated at Norwich University and Union College. He resided in Burlington, Vermont, and used his personal fortune in business ventures.

Active in state politics, Baxter was elected to the state house and later declined the Whig nomination in 1850. The Vermont Whigs elected him to their state committee in 1852, and he was an early member of the Republican Party.

== Early life and education ==
Carlos Baxter was born in Brownington, Vermont, on January 15, 1809, to William Baxter and Lydia Ashley. His brother, Portus Baxter, was elected to the United States House of Representatives. William was a state's attorney and member of the Vermont House of Representatives and left an estate worth $100,000 (equivalent to $2,800,000 in 2025) when he died in 1827.

Baxter entered Norwich University in 1821 and graduated in 1825. Entering the University of Vermont in 1826, he left in his sophomore year to attend Union College where he graduated with a Bachelor of Arts degree in 1830. The University of Vermont gave him an honorary degree in 1847.

== Career ==
On December 28, 1832, Baxter was admitted to the bar in Orleans County, Vermont. He moved to Burlington, Vermont, and stopped practicing law and instead used his personal wealth for business investments. He was part of a business venture that constructed woolen mills in Winooski, Vermont, in 1835. In 1849, Baxter and 30 other men petitioned the state legislature to give them a charter for a railroad. He had an income of $5,000 (equivalent to $110,000 in 2025) in 1866.

At the 1836 Whig state convention Baxter was selected to serve as a secretary. He was a member of the Whig town committee in Burlington in 1839 and the state committee in 1852. He represented Burlington in the state house from 1839 to 1841. Henry Leavenworth was given the Whig nomination for state representative in 1850, but declined and it was instead given to Baxter, who also declined as he would be away from home for a few months; Leavenworth later accepted the nomination.

An opponent of slavery, Baxter was one of the early members of the Republican Party. In the 1860 election, 130 votes in Fairfield, Vermont, were erroneously given to Baxter instead of his brother, who was running for Vermont's 3rd congressional district. From 1862 to 1867, Baxter served as the collector of internal revenue for Vermont's 3rd congressional district. During the 1872 presidential election he supported Liberal Republican nominee Horace Greeley.

== Personal life and death ==
On May 15, 1833, Baxter married Cornelia Deming, one of the daughters of Benjamin F. Deming, and had five children before her death on May 25, 1843. Baxter's daughter, Caroline, married Bradley Smalley. The Winterbotham Estate was owned by Baxter from 1833 to 1867 until he sold it to G.A. Austin for $15,000 (equivalent to $346,000 in 2025).

Paralyzed by a disease in 1870, Baxter suffered "an attack of paralysis" on January 26, 1874, which left the right side of his body paralyzed and him unable to speak. He died in Burlington, at 8:25 P.M. EST on January 28, 1874.

== Works cited ==
=== Books ===
- Baldwin, Frederick (1886). Biography of the Bar of Orleans County, Vermont. Vermont Watchman and State Journal Press.
- Comstock, John, ed. (1918). A List of the Principal Civil Officers of Vermont From 1777 to 1918. St. Albans Messenger.

=== News ===
- "Application for a Charter". The Burlington Free Press. May 18, 1849. p. 2 – via Newspapers.com.
- "Attack". St. Albans Messenger. January 27, 1874. p. 3 – via Newspapers.com.
- "Death of Carlos Baxter". Rutland Herald. January 30, 1874. p. 3 – via Newspapers.com.
- "House". St. Albans Messenger. November 1, 1849. p. 2 – via Newspapers.com.
- "Members of Congress For Vermont - Official Canvas -". Vermont Watchman. November 2, 1860. p. 1 – via Newspapers.com.
- "Real Estate". Burlington Weekly Sentinel. March 15, 1867. p. 3 – via Newspapers.com.
- "State Convention". Vermont Chronicle. March 3, 1836. p. 3 – via Newspapers.com.
- "The Income List". Burlington Times. August 11, 1866. p. 3 – via Newspapers.com.
- "The Whig State Convention". Vermont Journal. July 9, 1852. p. 2 – via Newspapers.com.
- "Town Representative". Burlington Weekly Free Press. July 12, 1839. p. 3 – via Newspapers.com.
- "U.S. Collectors and Assessor for Vt". St. Albans Messenger. July 24, 1862. p. 3 – via Newspapers.com.
- "Vermont Election". The Washingtonian. September 26, 1803. p. 3 – via Newspapers.com.
- "Vermont University". St. Albans Messenger. August 18, 1847. p. 2 – via Newspapers.com.
- "Whig Meeting". The Burlington Free Press. August 21, 1850. p. 2 – via Newspapers.com.
- Bushnell, Mark (June 4, 2017). "Then Again: Mills shaped the fabric of Winooski". VTDigger. Archived from the original on March 28, 2025.

=== Web ===
- "Baxter, Carlos". Union College. Archived from the original on July 23, 2024.
- "Blast From the Past: Champlain's Storied Academic Buildings". Champlain College. September 11, 2019. Archived from the original on March 28, 2025.
