= General Sutherland =

General Sutherland may refer to:

- Charles Sutherland (Surgeon General) (1831–1895), U.S. Army brigadier general
- Fred Sutherland (Canadian Air Force General) (born 1942), Canadian Air Force lieutenant general
- James W. Sutherland (1918–1987), U.S. Army lieutenant general
- Richard K. Sutherland (1893–1966), U.S. Army lieutenant general
