= Governor Proctor =

Governor Proctor may refer to:

- Fletcher D. Proctor (1860–1911), 51st Governor of Vermont
- Mortimer R. Proctor (1889–1968), 66th Governor of Vermont
- Redfield Proctor (1831–1908), 37th Governor of Vermont
- Redfield Proctor Jr. (1879–1957), 59th Governor of Vermont
