= Michael Steck =

Michael Steck may refer to:

- Michael Steck (Indian agent) (1818–1880), physician and Indian agent in New Mexico Territory
- Michael Steck, also known as Pandora Boxx, American drag queen
