= Israel B. Richardson =

Union Army general

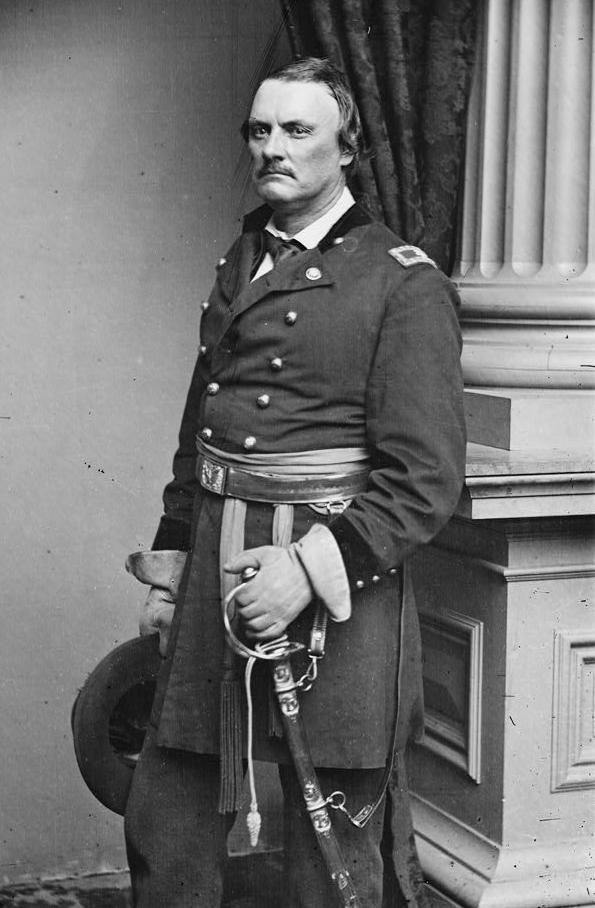
- General Israel B. Richardson
- Born: December 26, 1815; Fairfax, Vermont
- Died: November 3, 1862 (aged 46); Sharpsburg, Maryland
- Burial place: Oak Hill Cemetery; Pontiac, Michigan
- Military career
- Allegiance: United States (Union)
- Branch: United States Army; Union Army
- Service years: 1841–1855; 1861–1862
- Rank: Major General
- Nickname: Fighting Dick
- Commands: 1st Division, II Corps, Army of the Potomac
- Conflicts: Second Seminole War; Mexican–American War; American Civil War: Battle of Antietam (DOW)

Israel Bush Richardson (December 26, 1815 – November 3, 1862) was a United States Army officer during the Mexican–American War and American Civil War, where he was a major general in the Union Army. Nicknamed "Fighting Dick" for his prowess and persistence on the battlefield, he was mortally wounded at the Battle of Antietam near Sharpsburg, Maryland.

== Early life and career ==
Richardson was born in Fairfax, Vermont. He was reportedly a descendant of famed American Revolutionary War general Israel Putnam. He was appointed from Vermont to the United States Military Academy in West Point, New York. He graduated 38th out of 52 cadets in the Class of 1841. He was one of 23 classmates who would become generals during the Civil War. After some routine assignments, Richardson served as a second lieutenant in the Second Seminole War in Florida. He was promoted to first lieutenant on September 21, 1846.

He received two brevets for meritorious service during the Mexican–American War, to captain and major for the actions at Contreras, Churubusco, and Chapultepec. In Mexico while serving under General Winfield Scott in the Army of Occupation, he received his nickname, "Fighting Dick", (Note: A moniker shared by Confederate Major General Richard H. Anderson whom Richardson would meet at Antietam in the Civil War) which would carry over to the Civil War.

He later served as a captain in the 3rd U.S. Infantry (a rank he achieved in 1851) at various frontier outposts in Texas and New Mexico Territory, San Antonio, Texas 1848–49, Post Opposite El Paso del Norte, 1849–1850; Fort Fillmore 1851–52, 1852–53; Fort Webster, 1852, 1853–54; and Fort Thorn, 1854–55. He then resigned his commission in 1855 and began farming near Pontiac, Michigan.

== Civil War ==
When the Civil War broke out, Richardson was still farming in Michigan. He enlisted in the Union Army and recruited and organized the 2nd Michigan Infantry. He married Fannie Travor on May 18, 1861, in Wayne County, Michigan. When he reported with his regiment in Washington, DC, General Winfield Scott greeted him with "I'm glad to have my 'Fighting Dick' with me again". Richardson, promoted to colonel on May 25, 1861, was assigned command of the 4th Brigade, 1st Division, in the newly organized army of Brigadier General Irvin McDowell. His brigade saw limited action at the First Battle of Bull Run near Blackburn's Ford, and in covering the subsequent federal withdrawal to Washington. He was promoted to brigadier general, ranking from May 17, 1861.

He commanded several brigades in the Army of the Potomac and then the 1st Division of the II Corps during the Peninsula Campaign in mid-1862. He was involved in the fighting at the battles of Yorktown, Seven Pines, and the Seven Days. He was particularly distinguished in sharp fighting near the Chickahominy River. Richardson was promoted to major general after the Seven Days Battles. His division was stationed in Washington, DC, during the Second Battle of Bull Run and did not participate in that engagement.

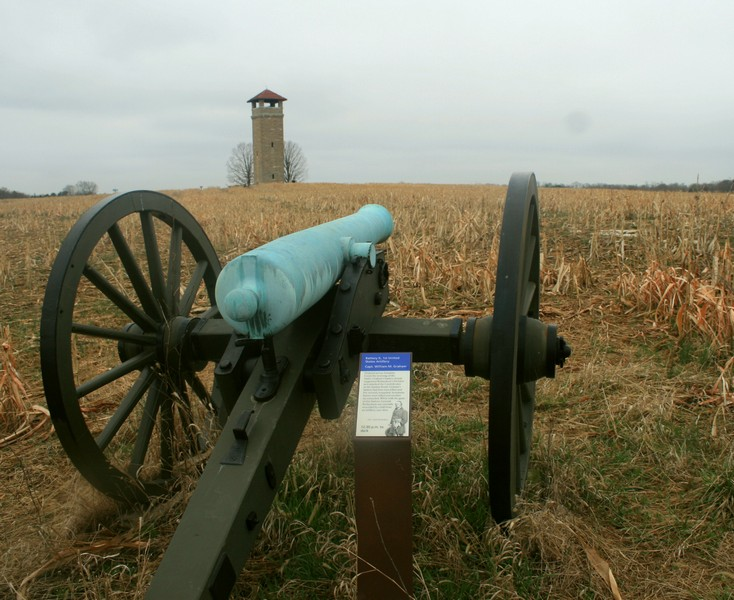
Richardson wound site.

Richardson's 1st Division played a key role during the Battle of Antietam on September 17, 1862, attacking Confederate positions in the center of the Sunken Road in support of the 3rd Division of Maj. Gen. William H. French. After stubborn fighting, by 1:00 pm, Richardson had gained control of the high ground in front of the apex of the defensive line, and his men enfiladed the remaining defenders in the road, which would gain the nickname "Bloody Lane" for the carnage. Richardson pushed forward beyond the road and was directing the fire of his artillery and organizing another attack when he was struck by a shell fragment.

Carried to the rear, Richardson was treated at a field hospital. His wound was not considered life-threatening, and he was given a room in Major General George B. McClellan's headquarters, the Pry House. President Abraham Lincoln paid his respects to the wounded Richardson during a visit to the battlefield in October. However, infection set in, and then pneumonia, which claimed the life of the popular general in early November. He was among six generals to be killed or mortally wounded at Antietam.

His body was escorted to Detroit. Large crowds lined the streets during his funeral procession to nearby Pontiac, where he was buried in Oak Hill Cemetery.

== Honors and awards ==
Fort Richardson, a Texas frontier fort active from 1867 to 1878, was named for him.

The Israel B. Richardson Camp #2 of the Sons of Union Veterans of the Civil War in Oakland, Michigan, was also named for the fallen general.

Battery Richardson, a 12-inch coast artillery gun battery at Fort Hancock, New Jersey, was named for him.

== See also ==
- List of American Civil War generals (Union)
