= Portus Baxter =

American banker, farmer, and politician (1806–1868)

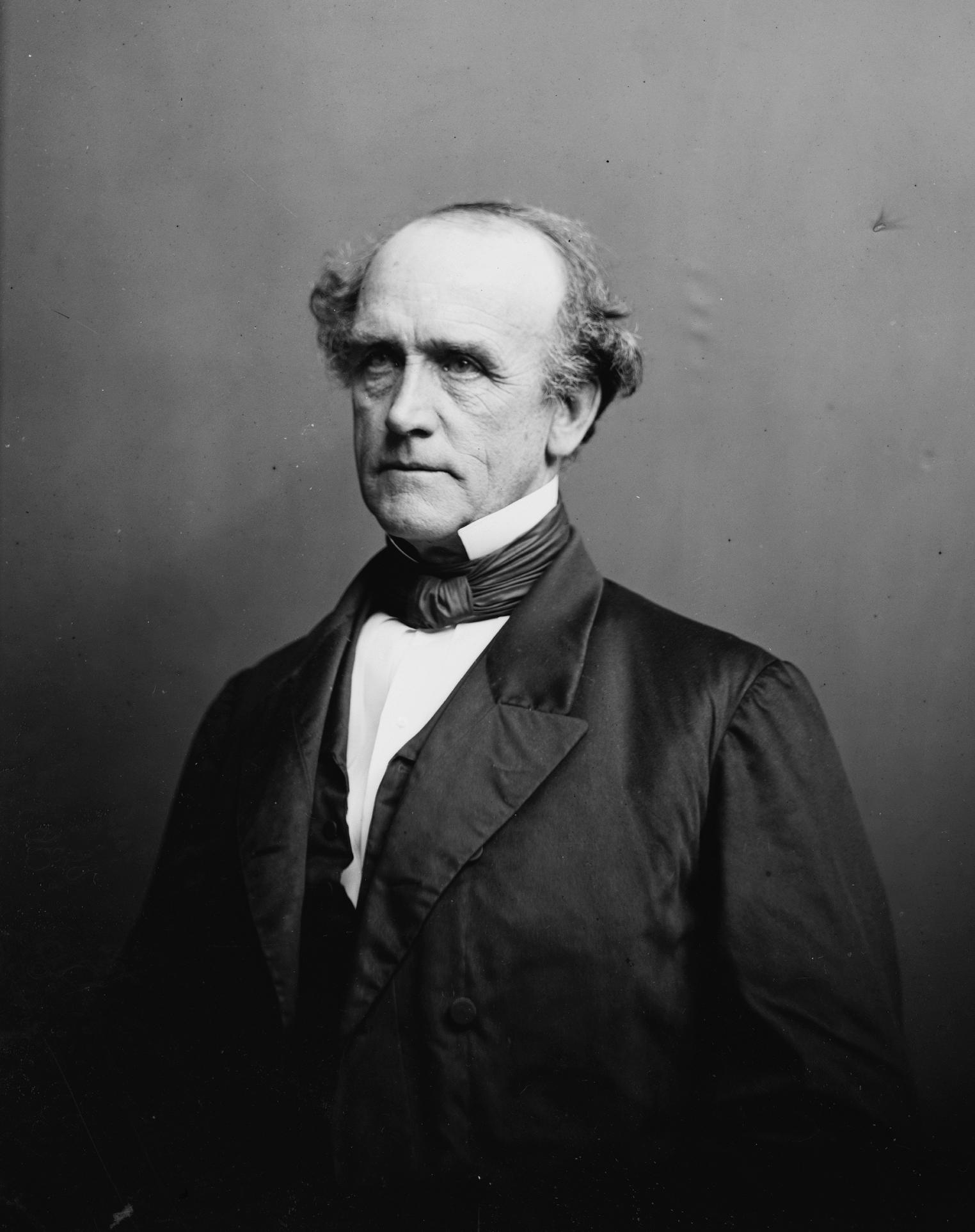

Member of the United States House of Representatives from Vermont's 3rd district
- In office March 4, 1861 – March 3, 1867
- Preceded by: Homer Elihu Royce
- Succeeded by: Worthington Curtis Smith

Personal details
- Born: December 4, 1806 Brownington, Vermont, US
- Died: March 4, 1868 (aged 61) Washington, D.C., US
- Party: Republican
- Spouse: Ellen Jannette Harris
- Relations: Carlos Baxter (brother)
- Children: William H. Baxter (1833–1843); Jedediah Hyde Baxter (1835–1836); Jedediah Hyde Baxter (1837–1890); Myron Leslie Baxter (1840–1895); Henry Clay Baxter (1844–1890); William P. Baxter (1847–1911)
- Parent: William Baxter (father)
- Education: Norwich Military Academy and University of Vermont
- Profession: Politician, Lawyer

Portus Baxter (December 4, 1806 – March 4, 1868) was a nineteenth-century banker, farmer, and politician from Vermont. He served three terms as a U.S. representative from the state's 3rd congressional district from 1861 to 1867.

== Early life ==
Baxter was born in Brownington, Vermont, the son of William Baxter and Lydia Ashley. After attending local schools, he graduated from Norwich Military Academy in 1824, and entered the University of Vermont in Burlington. He left UVM in 1826 after his father's death, and was responsible for administering his father's estate. (In 1852, UVM conferred on Baxter the honorary degree of Master of Arts.) He moved to Derby Line, Vermont, in 1828, where he engaged in agricultural and mercantile pursuits, which took him down the Connecticut River valley and into Canada. He was one of the original incorporators of the Connecticut and Passumpsic Rivers Railroad, which was planned to run almost the entire length of the state on the eastern border.

== Politics ==
Baxter was the only Whig delegate from New England who supported Zachary Taylor for president in 1848. He was one of Orleans County's assistant judges from 1836 to 1837. He was a presidential elector for Whig nominee Winfield Scott in 1852, and Republican nominee John C. Frémont in 1856.

=== Congress ===
In 1860, after many years of urging, he finally ran for Congress, was successful and eventually served three terms, from March 4, 1861, to March 3, 1867, in the 37th, 38th, and 39th Congresses. During the 38th Congress, he chaired the Committee on Expenditures in the Department of the Navy. He also served on the Agriculture and Elections Committees.

== Civil War ==
Baxter's time in Congress coincided with the four years of the American Civil War, and he was such a proponent of Vermont soldiers he earned the nickname, 'the soldier's friend.' One Vermonter's letters document instances where Mrs. Baxter, and other wives and daughters of Vermont's Congressional contingent, were strong supporters of the efforts of the Christian Commission. Baxter also frequently visited the regiments in the area immediately surrounding Washington, D.C., watching out for a son who had joined the 11th Vermont Infantry, and sponsoring others in their efforts to get promoted. During the bloody Battle of the Wilderness in May 1864, Baxter and his wife spent so much time in the hospitals in and around Fredericksburg, Virginia, tending to wounded soldiers, that they themselves suffered from exhaustion and eventually had to leave to recuperate.

== Death and burial ==
He remained in Washington, D.C. after completing his last term. Baxter suffered from asthma, and he died of pneumonia after a few days' illness. His was buried in the village cemetery in Strafford, Vermont.

Baxter General Hospital, the Civil War soldier's hospital in Burlington, was named for Baxter, as was Portus Baxter Park in Derby Line.

== Family ==
His wife, Ellen Jannette Harris (1811–1882), daughter of Judge Jedediah Hyde Harris of Strafford, whom he married on June 19, 1832, survived him by fourteen years. They had eight children, four of whom lived to adulthood. The most notable was Jedediah Hyde Baxter, who served as Surgeon General of the United States Army.

Judge Harris was the business partner of Senator Justin Smith Morrill. Baxter and Morrill became close friends as a result of the connection to Harris, with Morrill referring to Baxter as "one of nature's noblemen" and Baxter consciously patterning his business and political career on Morrill's.

== Works cited ==
- Comstock, John, ed. (1918). A List of the Principal Civil Officers of Vermont From 1777 to 1918. St. Albans Messenger.

U.S. House of Representatives
Preceded by Homer E. Royce	Member of the U.S. House of Representatives from Vermont's 3rd congressional district 1861–1867	Succeeded by Worthington C. Smith
