= 1922 Vermont gubernatorial election =

- November 7, 1922
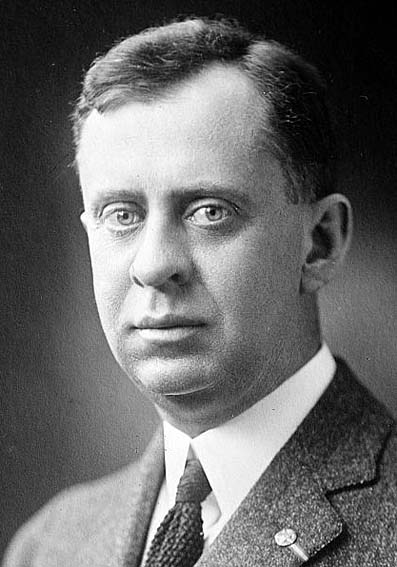

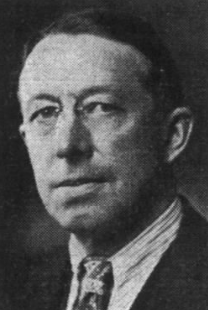
Nominee	Redfield Proctor Jr.	John Holmes Jackson
Party	Republican	Democratic
Alliance	Prohibition
Popular vote	51,104	17,059
Percentage	74.82%	24.97%
- Proctor: 40–50% 50–60% 60–70% 70–80% 80–90% 90-100% Jackson: 40–50% 50–60% 60–70% No Vote/Data
Governor before election
James Hartness
Republican
Elected Governor
Redfield Proctor Jr.
Republican

The 1922 Vermont gubernatorial election took place on November 7, 1922. Incumbent Republican James Hartness, per the "Mountain Rule", did not run for re-election to a second term as Governor of Vermont. Republican candidate Redfield Proctor Jr. defeated Democratic candidate John Holmes Jackson to succeed him.

== Republican primary ==
=== Results ===
Republican primary results
Party	Candidate	Votes	%	±%
Republican	Redfield Proctor Jr.	25,604	56.4	
Republican	Abram W. Foote	19,788	43.6	
Republican	Other	9	0.0	
Total votes		45,401	100.0	

== Democratic primary ==
=== Results ===
Democratic primary results
Party	Candidate	Votes	%	±%
Democratic	John Holmes Jackson	2,961	99.2	
Democratic	Other	24	0.8	
Total votes		2,985	100.0	

== General election ==
=== Results ===
1922 Vermont gubernatorial election
Party	Candidate	Votes	%	±%
Republican	Redfield Proctor Jr.	49,161	71.97	
Prohibition	Redfield Proctor Jr.	1,943	2.85	
Total	Redfield Proctor Jr.	51,104	74.82	
Democratic	John Holmes Jackson	17,059	24.97	
N/A	Other	144	0.21	
Total votes		68,307	100.0	
