= Oak Hill Cemetery (Pontiac, Michigan) =

- U.S. National Register of Historic Places
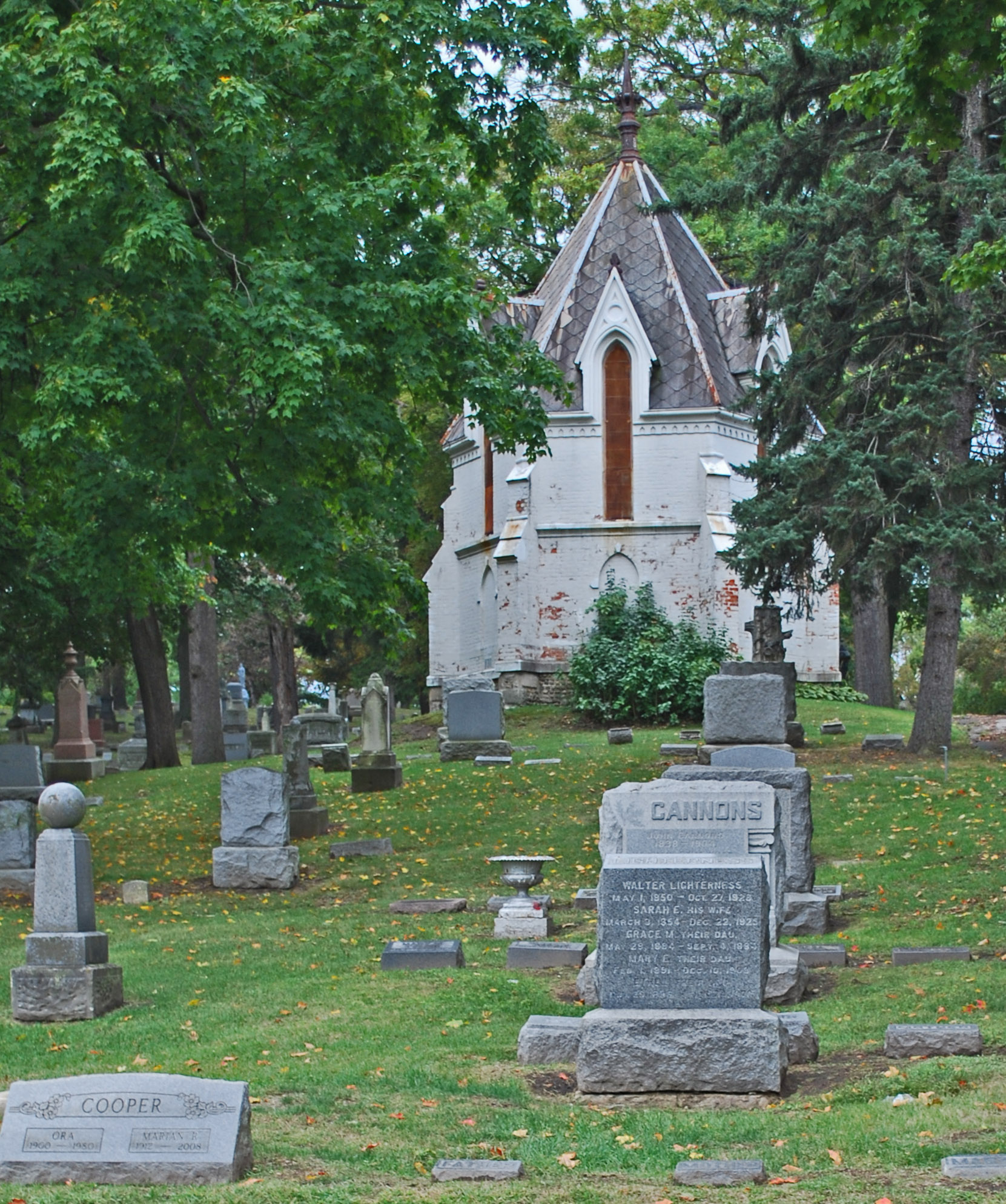
- Interactive map
- Location: 216 University Dr., Pontiac, Michigan
- Coordinates: 42°38′34″N 83°17′7″W
- Area: 23 acres (9.3 ha)
- Built: 1822
- Architectural style: Classical Revival, Gothic, Romanesque
- NRHP reference No.: 89000493
- Added to NRHP: June 20, 1989

The Oak Hill Cemetery is a cemetery located at 216 University Drive in Pontiac, Michigan. It was listed on the National Register of Historic Places in 1989.

== History ==
Pontiac was first settled in 1818 and 1819 by the Pontiac Company, and in 1822 the company set aside a parcel of land just east of town for use as a cemetery, church, and parsonage. In 1839 the village of Pontiac hired Captain Hervey Parke to survey the parcel and lay out a lot as a cemetery. This became the first portion of the present Oak Hill Cemetery, and the grounds were plotted for use by 1841.

Over time, more land was allocated to the cemetery until it reached its present size by about the turn of the century. Various improvements were made over the years, including replacing the original cemetery office, which burned, and adding the gate and fencing.

The cemetery contains the remains of six veterans of the Revolutionary War and well over 27 veterans of the Civil War, including General Israel B. Richardson, Michigan governor Moses Wisner, and General Joseph T. Copeland.

== Description ==
The Oak Hill Cemetery is located on a section of high, sloping ground east of downtown Pontiac. Groves of large, old trees, primarily hardwoods, cover the grounds. The cemetery is separated by University Avenue, with 15.6 acres north of University and 7.3 acres south. In the northern section, roadways and plots are laid out in a rectangular array, while south of University the roadways are laid out in a curvilinear form. A simple, wrought iron picket fence lines the road.

The cemetery office, a single story, front-gable structure of rock-face fieldstone, is located on the south side of University. Nearby is the Buckland Memorial Chapel, dating from 1898. The chapel is a sandstone structure built in an old English style. A number of mausoleums also dot the grounds.

== Gallery ==
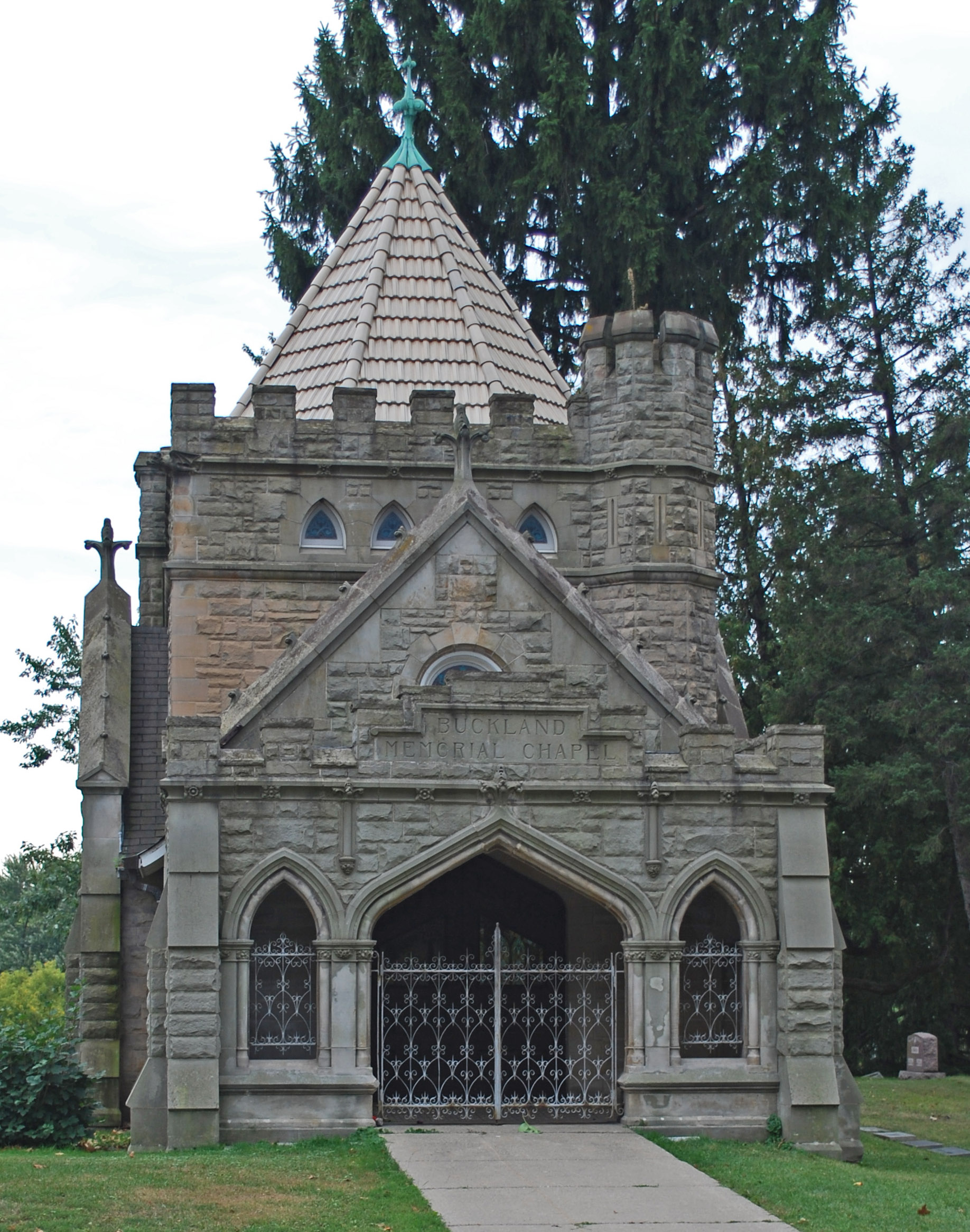

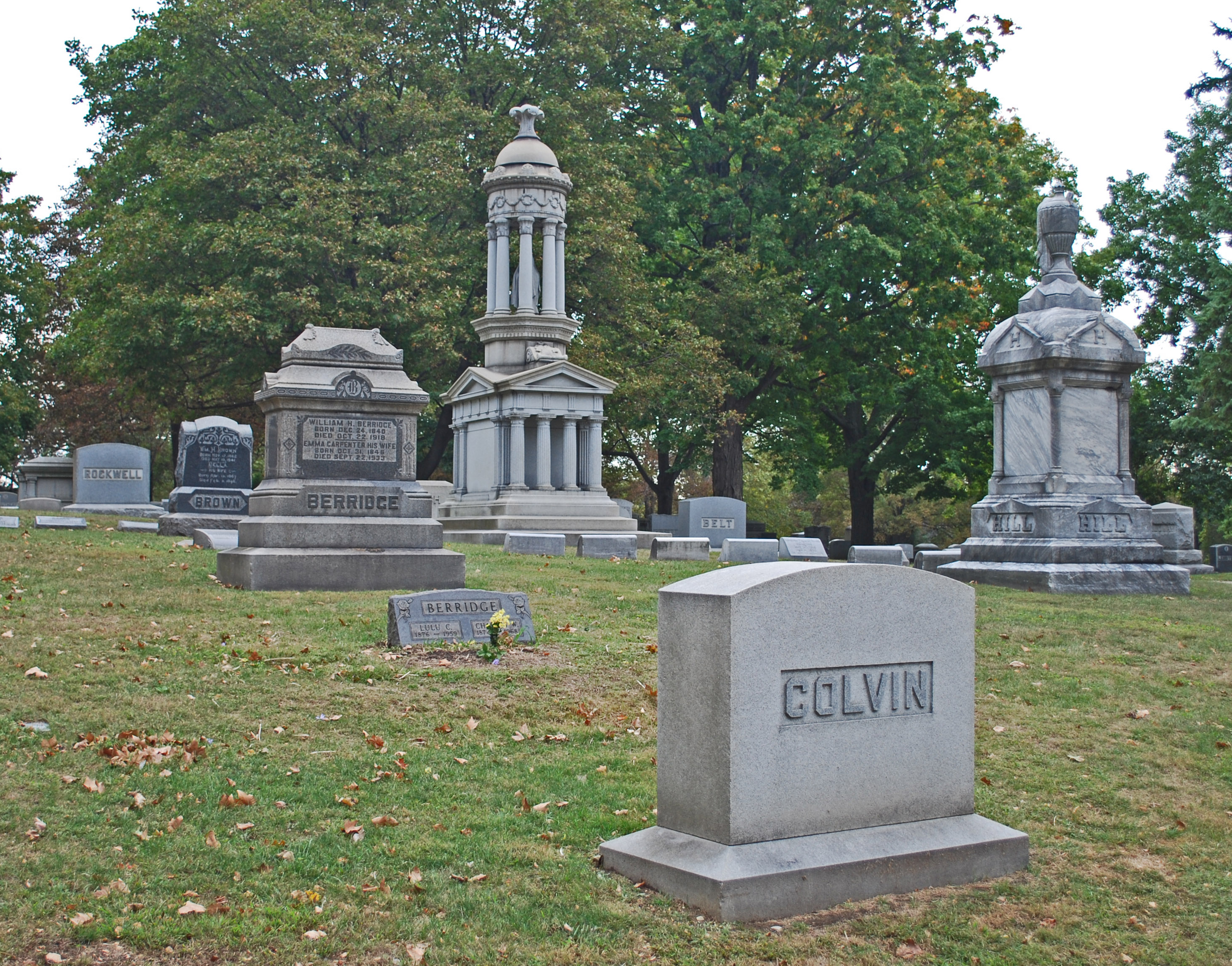

== See also ==
- National Register of Historic Places listings in Oakland County, Michigan
