= Charles Sutherland (physician) =

American doctor and Surgeon General of the US Army

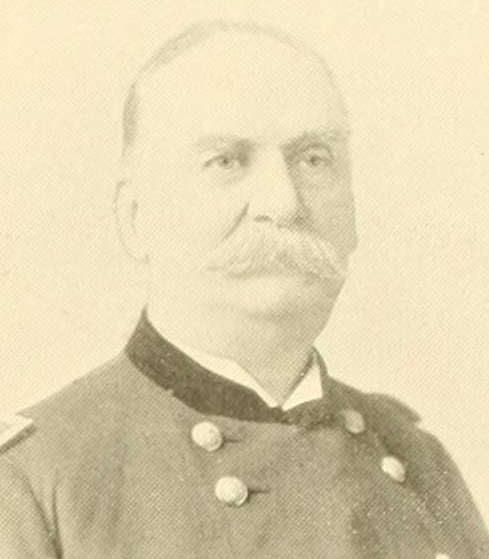
- From 1892's Officers of the Army and Navy (Regular) Who Served in the Civil War
- Born: May 10, 1831; Philadelphia, Pennsylvania, USA
- Died: May 10, 1895 (aged 64); Washington, D.C., USA
- Burial place: Arlington National Cemetery
- Spouse(s): Kate Brewer (1837–1866); Elizabeth Wirt Brewer (1847–1918)
- Relatives: Joel Barlow Sutherland (father)
- Military career
- Allegiance: United States of America
- Branch: United States Army
- Service years: 1852–1893
- Rank: Brigadier General
- Commands: Surgeon General of the Army
- Conflicts: American Civil War

Charles Sutherland (May 10, 1831 (Note: U.S. Army records list his date of birth as May 29, 1829, resulting in his mandatory retirement on May 29, 1893 at the age of sixty-four. The date of birth engraved on his tombstone is May 29, 1831.) – May 10, 1895) was an American doctor and officer in the United States Army. He was most notable for his service as Surgeon General of the United States Army.

== Early life ==
Charles Sutherland was born in Philadelphia, Pennsylvania on May 10, 1831, the son of Mary (Read) Sutherland and Joel Barlow Sutherland. Charles Sutherland was educated at private schools in Philadelphia, and attended Jefferson Medical College. He received his M.D. degree in 1849, and became a physician.

== Start of career ==
In 1852, Sutherland joined the United States Army as a contracted assistant surgeon. Sutherland passed his 1853 examination for appointment in the Army, and received his commission as a first lieutenant in the Medical Corps.

Sutherland served initially at Fort Monroe, Virginia and Jefferson Barracks, Missouri. After assisting to combat a cholera outbreak at Jefferson Barracks, Sutherland traveled west with the surveying party that decided upon the location for Fort Riley, Kansas and began construction of the post.

Following the Fort Riley expedition, Sutherland was assigned to duty in New Mexico, and served at posts including Fort Webster, Fort Fillmore, Fort Craig, Fort Stanton, and Fort Marcy. Sutherland served in New Mexico during the period when use of the Santa Fe Trail enabled white Americans to begin settling the Southwestern United States, and he took part in military actions against the Apache and Comanche tribes of Native Americans who resisted.

Sutherland was promoted to captain in 1857. Immediately prior to the American Civil War, Sutherland served at Fort Moultrie, South Carolina, followed by postings to Fort Davis and Fort Duncan in Texas.

== Civil War ==
At the start of the American Civil War, soldiers loyal to the Confederate States of America took over U.S. Army posts in Texas, and Sutherland narrowly escaped capture. He made his way to New York with other U.S. Army soldiers who had been stationed in Texas, and then received orders to take part in the expedition to garrison Fort Pickens on Santa Rosa Island near Pensacola, Florida. Possession of this post was important to the war effort because it demonstrated that the Union maintained a presence in the southern states while also contributing to the Union's effort to blockade the southern ports. Confederates unsuccessfully attempted to take the fort in 1861's Battle of Santa Rosa Island, an engagement in which Sutherland was a participant.

In April 1862, Sutherland was promoted to major and assigned to Fort Warren, Massachusetts, where Union soldiers guarded Confederate prisoners of war. Later that year Sutherland traveled west, and was assigned as chief medical purveyor for Union Army units in and around Corinth, Mississippi. He subsequently established medical supply depots in Columbus, Kentucky and Memphis, Tennessee, followed by setting up army field hospitals in Mississippi and Tennessee, as well as a floating hospital on the Mississippi River which was used by the Army of the Tennessee during the Vicksburg Campaign. During the Siege of Vicksburg, Sutherland served on the staff of Army of the Tennessee commander Ulysses S. Grant as assistant medical director and inspector of camps and transports. He took part in the Battle of Jackson and the Battle of Champion Hill, and was commended by Grant for effective medical support and efforts to improve camp hygiene, which caused the number of illnesses and deaths from malaria, smallpox and other diseases to be lower than had been the case in previous campaigns.

After the fall of Vicksburg, Sutherland was assigned as medical director for the Department of Virginia and North Carolina, with responsibility for medical support to units in the field, five rear area general hospitals. In the spring of 1864, Sutherland was appointed chief medical purveyor for the Army of the Potomac and the Army hospitals in and around Washington, DC. His assignment was later expanded to included hospitals in and around Annapolis, Maryland, and he remained in this position until the end of the war.

Following the Confederate surrender, Sutherland was praised by the Secretary of War for his successful acquisition, storage, and dissemination of more than $4 million in medical supplies and equipment (over $60 million in 2018). In 1865, he received brevet promotions to lieutenant colonel and colonel in recognition of the superior service he rendered throughout the war.

== Post-Civil War ==
After the war, Sutherland was appointed as chief purveyor of the medical supply depot in Washington, and he was promoted to lieutenant colonel in 1866. He later served as chief purveyor of the New York City medical supply depot, and he remained in this position until 1876.

In June 1876, Sutherland was promoted to colonel and assigned as medical director of the Division of the Pacific. He held this position until 1884, when he was assigned as medical director for the Division of the Atlantic.

== Surgeon General ==
Sutherland was promoted to brigadier general in December 1890 and appointed as Surgeon General of the United States Army, succeeding Jedediah Hyde Baxter. During his tenure, the Medical Department began the procedure of providing doctors instruments at the medical facilities where they worked, rather than issuing them personal equipment for which they were individually accountable. He also oversaw the organization of enlisted Medical Corps soldiers into detachments, and created the first Medical Corps school for enlisted soldiers at Fort Riley, Kansas.

In 1893, Sutherland retired and was succeeded by George Miller Sternberg.

== Retirement and death ==
In retirement, Sutherland was a resident of Washington, DC. He died there on May 10, 1895, and was buried at Arlington National Cemetery, Section 1, Graves 152 A-B.

== Family ==
Sutherland's first wife was Kate Brewer (1837–1866). In 1869, he married Elizabeth Wirt Brewer (1847–1918), the sister of his first wife. Charles and Elizabeth Sutherland were the parents of seven children. In Sutherland's 1895 obituaries, their ages were reported as ranging from nine to 24, and their names were given as Lucy, Edith, Catherine, Douglas, Roy, Malcolm, and Agnes.
