= Michael Steck (Indian agent) =

Physician and Indian Agent (1818–1880)

Michael Steck (1818–1880) was a medical doctor, Indian Agent (1852–1863), and Superintendent of Indian Affairs (1863–1865) in New Mexico Territory.

== Early life and education ==
Steck was the eldest son born to John and Elizabeth Hill Steck, in Hughesville, Pennsylvania, on October 8, 1818. He graduated in 1842, from Jefferson Medical College in Philadelphia. For a time he practiced medicine in Mifflinville, Pennsylvania, where he met and married his first wife, Roseanna Harvey. He came to New Mexico in 1849, as a contract physician for the U. S. Army, paid $1,554, with his wife who suffered from tuberculosis.

== Career ==
Steck became a temporary Indian Agent, for the Southern Apache (Chiricahua), at Fort Webster in 1853. In 1854 his position became permanent, his work winning the trust of the Apache leaders, and working with the military forces in the area to keep the peace, brought with it the support of several military officers in the Territory, who wrote a recommendation to the president, citing his "...knowledge of the country, and the Indians, their language and habits." With the appointment the location of his agency was moved from the dilapidated Fort Webster to the new Fort Thorn where it would remain until 1859.

In 1859, Steck proposed a reservation for the Chiricahua in the vicinity of Santa Lucia Springs in the upper Gila River. By 1860, the reservation had been approved but with the coming of the American Civil War and after the attacks on the Apache leader Mangus Coloradas by miners from Pinos Altos and the killing of Cochise's family members by the U. S. Army in the Bascom Affair in 1861 set off the Apache Wars, dooming the proposed reservation and Steck's hopes for a peace with the Apache.

Following the repulse of the Confederate invasion of New Mexico, Steck was appointed Superintendent of Indian Affairs in New Mexico Territory by Abraham Lincoln in 1863. Steck, an initial supporter of General Carleton’s plan to defeat the Navajo to make New Mexico safe and to civilize, Christianize both the Navajos and the Mescalero Apaches by transforming them into sedentary farmers. John A. Clark, Surveyor General of New Mexico wrote to Steck in October 1863, only 4,000 acres of land were arable in the Bosque Redondo reserve. Later increased to 6,000 acres, it was still far less than what would be needed to feed 9,000 Navajo and the Mescalero Apaches. When he realized the general had misjudged both the large size of the Navajo population (more than 9,000 captives) and the poor agricultural potential of the land near Fort Sumner, Steck opposed Carlton's plans. Steck argued that the Navajos should have a reservation in their own homeland and that it was impractical to resettle them in Apache territory on such inadequate lands. However, he was ignored by Carlton with disastrous results for the Navajo.

Following his resignation from the Superintendency in 1865, he became involved with the New Mexico Mining Company from 1865 to 1880. In 1867, he was elected to the New Mexico Territorial Legislature from Santa Fe county and served in the house of representatives, 1867-1868 session. Upon his return to Pennsylvania, he worked with the Muncy Creek Railway from 1873 to 1877.

== Personal life ==
In 1863, Steck's one-year-old son born in July 1862, died August 1862, in Santa Fe and was soon followed by his wife on October 3, 1864. He subsequently married Elizabeth Wood and they had three children.

== Death ==
He purchased land in Winchester, Virginia, in 1880, and died on October 4, 1880, in Winchester, Frederick County, Virginia, of a cerebral hemorrhage while fishing.
