= Clarence H. Beecher =

American politician

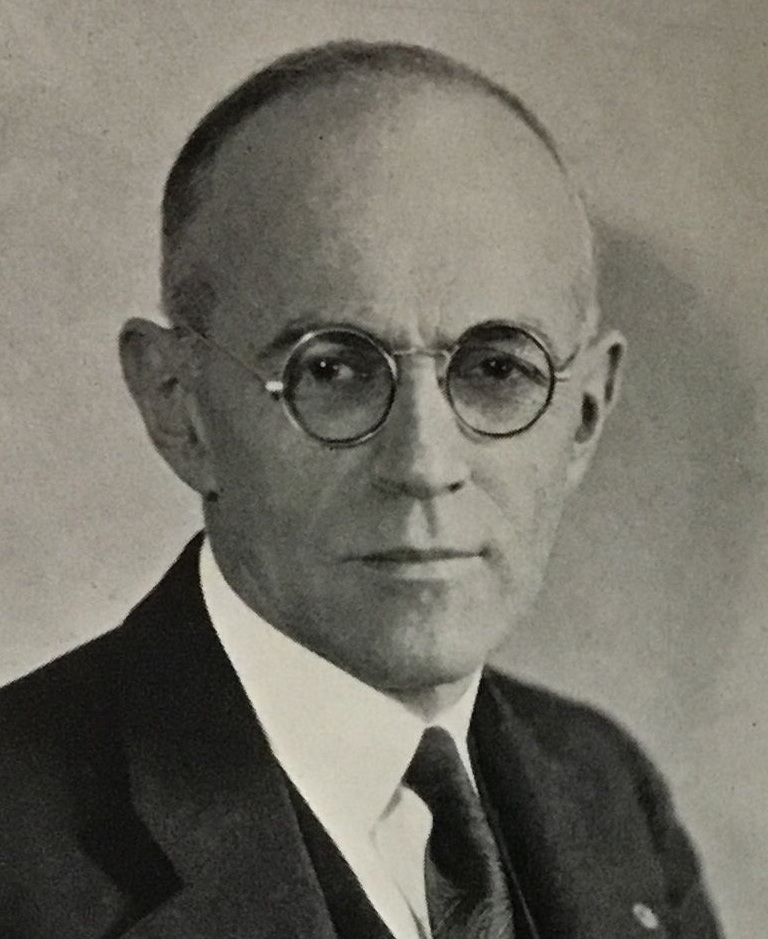
- From the 1932 edition of The Ariel, the University of Vermont yearbook

25th Mayor of Burlington, Vermont
- In office April 6, 1925 – April 1, 1929
- Preceded by: John Holmes Jackson
- Succeeded by: John Holmes Jackson

Member of the Burlington, Vermont Board of Aldermen
- In office April 7, 1919 – April 7, 1924
- Preceded by: E. A. Luck
- Succeeded by: Ralph H. Robinson
- Constituency: Ward 2
- In office 1934–1935
- Preceded by: E. Lloyd Gillette
- Succeeded by: Frank J. Hendee
- Constituency: Ward 2

Personal details
- Born: October 9, 1877 Granville, New York, U.S.
- Died: November 21, 1959 (aged 82) Burlington, Vermont, U.S.
- Resting place: Lakeview Cemetery, Burlington, Vermont
- Party: Republican
- Spouse(s): Florence Jeanette Russell (m. 1904, div. 1931); Reba Mildred Jones (m. 1931-1959, his death)
- Children: 2
- Parents: David O. Beecher (father); Mary E. Waring (mother)
- Education: University of Vermont
- Profession: Medical doctor

Clarence H. Beecher (October 9, 1877 – November 21, 1959) was an American physician and politician who served as the 25th Mayor of Burlington, Vermont. His eight-vote victory against James E. Burke in 1927 is the smallest margin of victory in any Burlington mayoral race.

== Early life ==
Beecher was born on a farm in Granville, New York on October 9, 1877, the son David O. Beecher and Mary E. Waring. In 1900, he graduated from the University of Vermont medical college with highest honors. He did post-graduate studies in Boston, New York City, and Philadelphia, as well as studying internal medicine in Vienna, Austria. He practiced in Burlington and was a member of the faculty at the University of Vermont. Beecher was the first doctor to use insulin in Vermont.

== Career ==
In 1919, he was given the Republican nomination for Ward Two's alderman election and defeated Robert Cannon with 601 votes to 257 votes. On February 20, 1922, he was renominated by the Republican city committee for alderman and faced no opposition in the election due to the Democratic city committee not selecting a candidate. On February 16, 1924, he declined to seek reelection and the Republican nomination for Ward Two's alderman was given to Ralph H. Robinson.

=== Mayoral ===
On February 2, 1925, he announced that he would seek the Republican nomination for mayor and was given the nomination by unanimity on February 11. Beecher defeated former Mayor James E. Burke of the Citizens Party and President of the Board of Alderman George L. Edwards of the Nonpartisan League and Democratic Party with 2,429 votes to 1,845 votes and 994 votes. During his tenure the Burlington City Hall, Memorial Auditorium, Central Fire Station, and the Winooski Bridge were all constructed and he managed recovery in Burlington following the Great Vermont Flood of 1927. In 1927, he narrowly defeated James E. Burke again by only 89 votes with 3,191 votes to 3,108 votes. Due to the closeness of the election Burke filed a lawsuit attempting to remove Beecher from office, but the Vermont Supreme Court ruled in Beecher's favor on January 2, 1929, although it decreased his vote total to 3,016. He chose not to run for reelection in 1929 and was succeeded by former Mayor John Holmes Jackson.

== Later life ==
In 1932, he served as a delegate to the Vermont Republican Party's state convention. On March 12, 1934, Beecher was given the Republican nomination for Ward Five alderman with 19 votes against Meader Martin's 3 votes and on March 27, 1934, he narrowly defeated Democratic Oscar H. Heininger by 28 votes for Ward Five's alderman seat with 553 votes to 525 votes in a special election to fill the seat following E. Lloyd Gillett's resignation. He did not seek reelection in 1935, and was succeeded by Frank J. Hendee after he defeated Meader Martin in the general election.

On January 13, 1953, the Republican city committee gave him the mayoral nomination, but was defeated in a landslide by incumbent Democratic Mayor J. Edward Moran with 5,091 votes to 3,403 votes and he performed worse than Republican aldermen in every ward except in ward one. During the mayoral race he criticized Moran for his handling of Burlington's new electric generator plant and blamed him for its poor management.

From 1941 to 1945, he served as dean of the University of Vermont's medical college and in 1958, the University of Vermont awarded him the honorary degree of Doctor of Science. On November 11, 1959, Beecher suffered a heart attack and was taken to Mary Fletcher Hospital (now the University of Vermont Medical Center), where he died on November 21. He was buried at Lakeview Cemetery in Burlington.

== Family ==
In 1904, Beecher married Florence Jeanette Russell (1882-1957). They were the parents of two children, John (1906-1981) and Jeanette (1909-1997). They divorced in May 1931 and on June 8, 1931, he married Reba Mildred Jones (1909-1996).
