= David Allen Smalley =

American judge

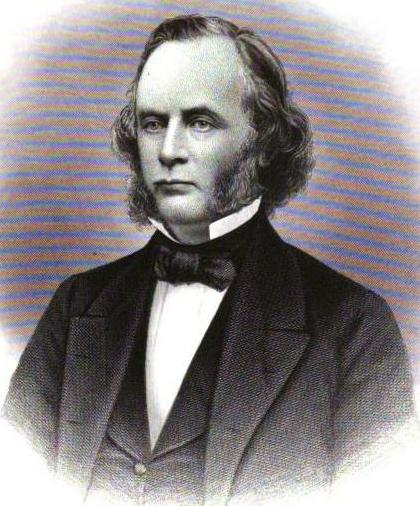
- From 1886's Biography of the Bar of Orleans County, Vermont

Judge of the United States District Court for the District of Vermont
- In office February 3, 1857 – March 10, 1877
- Appointed by: Franklin Pierce
- Preceded by: Samuel Prentiss
- Succeeded by: Hoyt Henry Wheeler

Chairman of the Democratic National Committee
- In office 1856–1860
- Preceded by: Robert Milligan McLane
- Succeeded by: August Belmont

Personal details
- Born: April 6, 1809 Middlebury, Vermont, US
- Died: March 10, 1877 (aged 67) Burlington, Vermont, US
- Resting place: Greenmount Cemetery; Burlington, Vermont, US
- Party: Democratic
- Spouse: Laura Barlow (m. 1833)
- Relations: Bradley Barlow (brother-in-law)
- Children: 5, including Bradley

David Allen Smalley (April 6, 1809 – March 10, 1877) was a United States district judge of the United States District Court for the District of Vermont.

== Education and career ==
Smalley was born in Middlebury, Vermont, on April 6, 1809. He graduated from the academy in St. Albans, read law with his uncle's firm, Smalley & Adams, and was admitted to the bar in 1831. He practiced in Jericho, Vermont, where he was also postmaster from 1831 to 1836. He subsequently relocated, first to Lowell, Vermont in 1836, and then to Burlington, Vermont from 1836 to 1857. He was a member of the Vermont Senate from 1843 to 1844. He practiced law in Burlington with different partners at different times. One partner was Edward J. Phelps, and the firm of Smalley & Phelps included George F. Edmunds among those who studied law in their offices. At the 1852 Democratic National Convention he was vice chairman of the Vermont delegation, a member of the platform committee and was selected to serve as Vermont's member of the Democratic National Committee. President Franklin Pierce appointed him Collector of Customs for the District of Vermont on April 6, 1853, and he served until February 16, 1857. Again a delegate at the 1856 Democratic National Convention held in Cincinnati, Ohio, he was reappointed to the National Committee, and he served as chairman from 1856 to 1860.

=== 1860 Democratic National Convention ===
As Chairman of the Democratic National Committee it was Smalley's task to open the ill-fated 1860 Democratic National Convention in Charleston, South Carolina.

== Federal judicial service ==
Smalley was nominated by President Franklin Pierce on February 2, 1857, to a seat on the United States District Court for the District of Vermont vacated by Judge Samuel Prentiss. He was confirmed by the United States Senate on February 3, 1857, and received his commission the same day. His service terminated on March 10, 1877, due to his death in Burlington. He was buried at Greenmount Cemetery in Burlington.

== Honor ==
Smalley received an honorary Master of Arts degree from the University of Vermont in 1846.

== Family ==
In 1833, Smalley married Laura Barlow, the daughter of Bradley Barlow (1770–1836), and sister of Congressman Bradley Barlow. They had five children, four of whom lived to adulthood; Henry Adams; Bradley Barlow; Jacob Meack; and Eugene Allen.

Henry A. Smalley (1834–1888) attended Norwich University and the University of Vermont. He was a graduate of the United States Military Academy and attained the rank of brevet Brigadier General during the American Civil War. He later worked as an engineer for New York City, and was responsible for the construction of the New Croton Aqueduct.

Bradley Smalley (1835–1909) was a Vermont attorney. He served on the staff of Governor Frederick Holbrook with the rank of colonel during the Civil War. Bradley B. Smalley was later appointed Clerk of the United States District Court and Collector of Customs. He also served on the Burlington City Council and was a member of the Democratic National Committee.

Jacob M. Smalley (1837–1874) was a United States Navy veteran who served in the Union Navy during the Civil War. He subsequently served as a Deputy US Customs Collector and Deputy US Marshal for Vermont and engaged in business ventures including an ownership stake in Utah's Bingham Canyon Mine.

Eugene A. Smalley (1839–1913) attended the University of Vermont and Union College. He enlisted for the Civil War as a Private in the 19th Ohio Infantry. He was subsequently commissioned as a First Lieutenant in the United States Marine Corps. After his 1866 discharge he was a farmer in Colchester, Vermont, and also worked as Vermont's Deputy Customs Collector and Deputy United States Marshal.

== Sources ==
- David A. Smalley at The Political Graveyard

Legal offices
Preceded by Samuel Prentiss	Judge of the United States District Court for the District of Vermont; 1857–1877	Succeeded by Hoyt Henry Wheeler
