= The American Presidency Project =

Online archive

- Abbreviation: APP
- Formation: 1999; 27 years ago
- Founder: Gerhard Peters; John Woolley
- Type: online archive
- Parent organization: University of California, Santa Barbara
- Website: presidency.ucsb.edu

The American Presidency Project (APP) is a free searchable online archive that has compiled the messages, documents, or papers of American presidents from 1789 to the present, as well as basic statistics and information related to studying the presidency.

Launched by John Woolley and Gerhard Peters in 1999, the APP is hosted by the University of California at Santa Barbara (UCSB) and supported through UCSB entities and tax-deductible donations. The APP database contains:

- Documentation for both written communications and utterances from remarks, press conferences, orders, memorandums, and proclamations.
- Documents on candidates' remarks, election debates, and information released by the White House Office of the Press Secretary.
- Data and mapping archive and media archive
- Background essays to help readers understand and use documented presidential communications.
- Analysis and commentary

The search function takes user-defined words or phrases and accepts parameters such as the name of the president, document types, and dates and date ranges. As of 2024, it contains 163,161 presidential and non-presidential records.
