= Jedediah Hyde Baxter =

US Army officer (1837–1890)

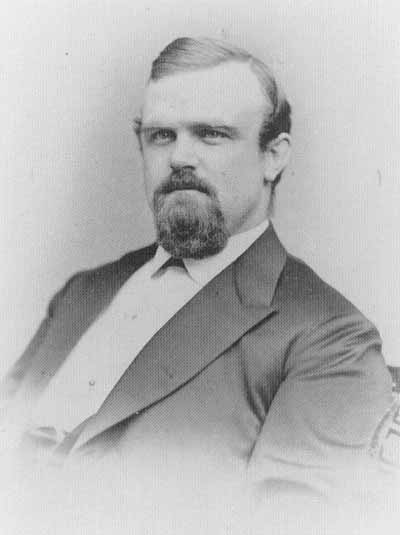
- Army Medical Department photo, circa 1885
- Born: March 11, 1837; Strafford, Vermont, US
- Died: December 4, 1890 (aged 53); Washington, D.C., US
- Burial place: Arlington National Cemetery
- Spouse: Florence Tryon (m. 1876)
- Relatives: Portus Baxter (father)
- Military career
- Allegiance: United States
- Branch: United States Army
- Service years: 1861–1890
- Rank: Brigadier General
- Commands: Campbell General Hospital; Chief Medical Purveyor, U.S. Army Medical Department; Surgeon General of the United States Army
- Conflicts: American Civil War: Peninsula Campaign; Siege of Yorktown; Battle of Hanover Court House; Battle of Seven Pines

Jedediah Hyde Baxter (March 11, 1837 – December 4, 1890) was a career United States Army officer and doctor who attained the rank of brigadier general as Surgeon General of the United States Army.

Born in Strafford, Vermont, Baxter was the son of Portus Baxter and Ellen Janette Harris. He received his medical degree from the University of Vermont in 1860, completed his internship and residency at Bellevue and Blackwell's Island Hospitals in New York City, and enlisted in the Union Army for the American Civil War. Assigned initially as surgeon of the 12th Massachusetts Volunteer Infantry, he later became a brigade surgeon, commanded Campbell General Hospital in Washington, D.C., and then served as Chief Medical Officer of the Provost Marshal's Bureau. Baxter took part in the Peninsula Campaign, including the Battles of Yorktown, Hanover Court House, and Seven Pines, and attained the rank of major, in addition to receiving brevet promotions to lieutenant colonel and colonel of Volunteers, and a brevet as a colonel in the regular Army.

After the war, Baxter remained in the Army as a member of the newly organized Medical Department, and was appointed Assistant Medical Purveyor with the rank of lieutenant colonel. In 1872, he was appointed Chief Medical Purveyor, and in 1874 he received promotion to colonel. In 1875, Baxter graduated from Columbian University (now George Washington University Law School) with an LL.B. degree. Baxter's duties as Chief Medical Purveyor included serving as personal physician to the President of the United States, and he attended James A. Garfield's family. Baxter was out of town when Charles J. Guiteau shot Garfield in July 1881, and was not able to examine Garfield following the shooting. Garfield's other physicians prevented Baxter from seeing Garfield, which generated controversy both immediately after the shooting and after Garfield's death several weeks later.

In August 1890, Baxter was named the Army's surgeon general and promoted to brigadier general. He soon afterwards became ill with uremia, which caused him to suffer a stroke. He died on December 4, 1890, and was buried at Arlington National Cemetery.

== Early life ==
Jedediah H. Baxter, the son of Portus Baxter and Ellen Janette Harris, was born in Strafford, Vermont, on March 11, 1837. He attended Perkins Academy in South Woodstock and St. Johnsbury Academy, and studied at Norwich University for two years. He graduated from the University of Vermont in 1859, and received his medical degree from UVM in 1860. Baxter subsequently completed his internship and residency at Bellevue and Blackwell's Island Hospitals in New York City.

== Civil War ==
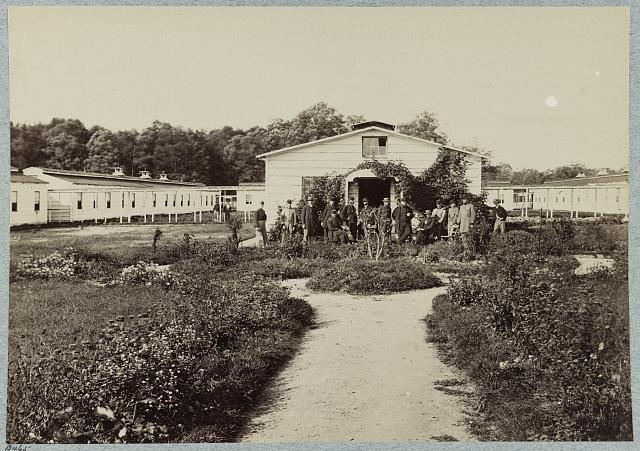
Campbell General Hospital during the American Civil War.

On June 26, 1861, Baxter enlisted for the American Civil War, joining the 12th Massachusetts Volunteer Infantry as regimental surgeon. He served until April, 1862, when he was appointed as a brigade surgeon in the Army of the Potomac. He took part in the Peninsula Campaign, including the Battles of Yorktown, Hanover Court House, and Seven Pines.

Baxter later served as head of Campbell General Hospital in Washington, D.C. He ended the war as Chief Medical Officer of the Provost Marshal's Bureau with the rank of major. In 1865 he received brevet promotions to lieutenant colonel and colonel of Volunteers, and in 1867 he received a brevet as a colonel in the regular Army.

== Post Civil War ==
After the war the Army's health care professionals were organized as the Medical Department, and Baxter was appointed Assistant Medical Purveyor with the rank of lieutenant colonel in the Regular Army. In 1871 he received a Master of Arts degree from UVM.

In March, 1872 Baxter was appointed Chief Medical Purveyor, and in 1874 he was promoted to colonel. In 1875 Baxter graduated from Columbian University (now George Washington University Law School) with an LL.B. degree.

Baxter's duties included serving as personal physician to the President of the United States. He attended James A. Garfield's family, but was out of town when Charles J. Guiteau shot Garfield in July 1881. As a result, Baxter did not examine Garfield following the shooting or treat him during his subsequent illness. By the time he rushed back to Washington, Doctor Willard Bliss had taken charge and would not let Baxter see the wounded President. According to contemporary accounts, Bliss stated that Baxter was attempting to see Garfield out of a desire for personal glory and fame, a charge which had the effect of causing Baxter to minimize his involvement so that Bliss would not seem to be correct. In fact Bliss had only recently been readmitted to the District of Columbia Medical Society, which had expelled him in 1870 over his advocacy for African American doctors to be admitted. In addition, he had been expelled over willingness to consult with homeopaths at a time when most medical professionals were allopaths and disdained homeopathy. Having been readmitted to the Society so recently, Bliss likely maintained his lead role in Garfield's treatment as a way to restore his own reputation.

== Army Surgeon General ==
In August 1890, Baxter was named the Army's Surgeon General and promoted to brigadier general, appointed by President Benjamin Harrison, who was a longtime patient. Baxter's appointment had been championed by Secretary of War Redfield Proctor, a fellow Vermonter and Civil War veteran.

== Death and burial ==
Baxter became ill with uremia soon after assuming his new duties. He suffered a stroke as a result and died in Washington, D.C., on December 4, 1890. Baxter was buried at Arlington National Cemetery, Section 2, Grave 1000.

== Marriage ==
In 1876 Baxter married Florence Tryon (November 11, 1845 – February 12, 1914) of Boston, Massachusetts. They had no children.

== Other ==
Baxter was a member of the Military Order of the Loyal Legion of the United States.

He was the author of 1875's Statistics, Medical and Anthropological, of the Provost-Marshal-General's Bureau. This invaluable reference work contains records and analysis of physical examinations and other medical data for more than one million men who served the Union in the Civil War.

The Army hospital in Spokane, Washington, was named for Baxter.

Military offices
Preceded by John Moore	Surgeon General of the United States Army; 1890–1890	Succeeded by Charles Sutherland
