= Redfield Proctor Jr. =

American politician (1879–1957)

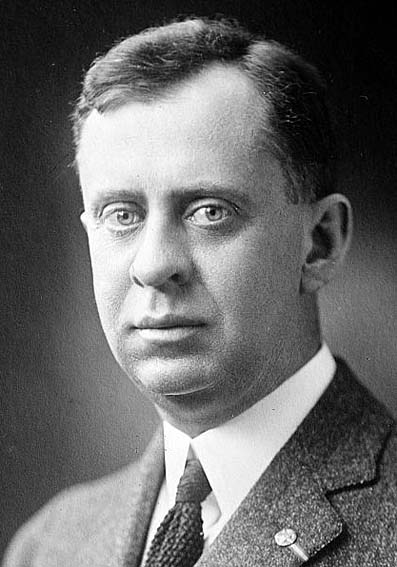

59th Governor of Vermont
- In office January 4, 1923 – January 8, 1925
- Lieutenant: Franklin S. Billings
- Preceded by: James Hartness
- Succeeded by: Franklin S. Billings

Member of the Vermont Senate from Rutland County
- In office 1917–1919 Serving with Charles H. Dunton, George E. Chalmers, Bertrand R. Demeritt, Fred E. Steele, Wilson E. Aldrich
- Preceded by: William S. Bascom, William H. Wright, Hugh J. Roberts, Carl H. Hinsman
- Succeeded by: G. Frank Hendee, Harvey R. Kingsley, David L. Morgan, E. C. Taylor

Member of the Vermont House of Representatives from Proctor
- In office 1912–1917
- Preceded by: George Z. Thompson
- Succeeded by: Benjamin Williams

Personal details
- Born: Redfield Proctor Jr. April 13, 1879 Proctor, Vermont, U.S.
- Died: February 5, 1957 (aged 77) Proctor, Vermont, U.S.
- Resting place: South Street Cemetery, Proctor, Vermont, U.S.
- Party: Republican
- Spouse: Mary Sherwood Hedrick
- Children: 3
- Education: Massachusetts Institute of Technology
- Profession: Executive, Vermont Marble Company

Military service
- Allegiance: United States
- Branch/service: United States Army; United States Army Reserve
- Years of service: 1917–1919 (Army); 1919–1941 (Reserve)
- Rank: Colonel
- Commands: 322nd Engineer Regiment
- Battles/wars: World War I

Redfield Proctor Jr. (April 13, 1879 – February 5, 1957) was an American business executive and politician who served as the 59th governor of Vermont from 1923 to 1925.

== Life and career ==
The son of Emily Jane (née Dutton) and Redfield Proctor, a United States Senator from Vermont, Proctor Jr. was born in Proctor, Vermont, on April 13, 1879. He received a Bachelor of Science degree in mechanical engineering from the Massachusetts Institute of Technology in 1902 and was employed as an executive at the Vermont Marble Company, his family's business. He rose to the position of vice president of the company and served as president of the Proctor Trust Company. He married Mary Sherwood Hedrick and they had three children.

Proctor was also prominent in other businesses and trade groups, including serving as president of the Clarendon and Pittsford Railroad, and serving on the board of directors of Boston's Shawmut Bank, the National Association of Manufacturers and the United States Chamber of Commerce.

Proctor was involved in several civic activities, including serving as a member of the Vermont Sanitarium Board of Trustees, and as a Trustee of Middlebury College, Vassar College and the University of Vermont. He served as a selectman for the Town of Proctor before winning election to the Vermont House of Representatives, where he served from 1912 to 1917, and the Vermont State Senate where he served from 1917 to 1919. Proctor was a delegate to the 1920 Republican National Convention.

Proctor enlisted in the United States Army for World War I, was commissioned as a captain of Engineers, and received his initial training at Fort Belvoir, Virginia. Proctor was stationed at Washington Barracks, where he served as supply officer for the 322nd Engineer Regiment. He remained in the Army Reserve after the war and attained the rank of colonel as commander of the 322nd Engineers, which was a unit of the Reserve's 97th Division.

In 1922 he was elected Governor and he served from 1923 to 1925. His term was marked by success at modernizing Vermont's state government, including authorizing the executive branch to employ a budget director and propose the state budget, and enabling the Governor to remove commissioners and department heads.

After his term Proctor returned to Vermont Marble, serving as its president until retiring and becoming chairman of the board of directors in 1952, a position in which he served until his death in Proctor on February 5, 1957. He was buried at South Street Cemetery in Proctor.

== Family ==
In addition to being the son of Redfield Proctor, Proctor Jr. was the brother of Governor Fletcher D. Proctor, and the uncle of Governor Mortimer R. Proctor.

Party political offices
Preceded by James Hartness	Republican nominee for Governor of Vermont; 1922	Succeeded by Franklin S. Billings
Political offices
Preceded by James Hartness	Governor of Vermont; 1923–1925	Succeeded by Franklin S. Billings
