= Fort Webster, New Mexico =

19th century military installation

Fort Webster, a fort located at two locations near Santa Rita and San Lorenzo in Grant County, New Mexico between 1851–1853 and 1859–1860.

== History ==
=== Fort Santa Rita ===
Fort Santa Rita was created in 1804 by the Spanish to protect the copper mines of Santa Rita (Grant County), in New Mexico. It had a triangular shape and three towers. It was built by a civilian, Manuel Elguea. It was the target of constant attacks by the Apaches and in 1838 it was abandoned by the Centralist Republic of Mexico. In 1848, it was included in territory ceded to the US as part of the Treaty of Guadalupe Hidalgo.

=== 1st Fort Webster (1851) ===
In 1851 the United States Boundary Commission occupied the fort and named it Dawson Cantonment. In 1852 it is occupied by the United States Army, which will call it Gila Copper Mines Post or Fort Webster.

=== 2nd Fort Webster (1852 - 1853, 1859 - 1860) ===
The original post of Fort Webster at the Santa Rita copper mines was moved in September 1852, 14 miles east to the west bank of the Rio Mimbres, about one mile west of the modern town of San Lorenzo. This post was itself then abandoned in December 1853 for Fort Thorn. It was briefly reoccupied in 1859 as Station at the Copper Mines, until being abandoned in 1860.

== Status of the site ==
The site of the old presidio, Cantonment Dawson and the original site of Fort Webster was obliterated by the great open pit of the Chino Copper Mine in Grant County, New Mexico.

== Sources ==
- Roberts, Robert B., Encyclopedia of Historic Forts: The Military, Pioneer, and Trading Posts of the United States, Macmillan, New York, 1988, 10th printing, ISBN 0-02-926880-X, page 533-534
- Frazer, Robert W., Forts of the West, University of Oklahoma Press, Norman OK, 1965, ISBN 0-8061-1250-6, pages 106-107
- Frazer, Robert W. (editor), Mansfield on the conditions of The Western Forts, University of Oklahoma Press, Norman OK, 1963, ISBN 0-8061-1083-X, pages 51–54
