= St. Albans Messenger =

Newspaper published in Saint Albans, UK

- Type: Biweekly newspaper
- Owner: O'Rourke Media Group
- Publisher: Jim O'Rourke
- Editor: Bridget Higdon
- Founded: 1833
- Language: English
- Headquarters: St. Albans, Vermont
- OCLC number: 11932116
- Website: samessenger.com

The St. Albans Messenger is a newspaper published in St. Albans, Vermont. The newspaper is distributed throughout Franklin County and Northwestern Vermont.

== History ==
In 1833 The Franklin Journal was founded in St. Albans as a newspaper advocating the platform of the Anti-Masonic Party. From 1833 to 1837 it was published and edited by Samuel N. Sweet and then Joseph H. Brainerd. Joseph H. Brainerd was the cousin of Lawrence Brainerd.

In 1837 Joseph Brainerd sold the paper to Enoch B. Whiting, who changed the name to The St. Albans Messenger. In 1863 Whiting began publication of the Messenger as a daily newspaper, and it has continued as a daily since then.

In 1871 Whiting sold the Messenger to Albert Clarke and J. Dorsey Taylor, who merged it with another paper to create The Messenger and Transcript. Clarke became sole owner in 1873 and ran the newspaper with William E. Barrett as editor until 1880, when S. B. Pettingill became the editor. Pettingill also obtained control of another paper, The St. Albans Advertiser, and consolidated their publication as The Messenger and Advertiser. Subsequent publishers and editors included D. W. Dixon, Warren Gibbs, and George T. Childs. In 1892 a corporation was formed to publish the paper, the Messenger Company. Edward Curtis Smith served as president of the Messenger company in the 1890s.

In 1892 Frank L. Greene became assistant editor, and he became editor in 1899.

The Messenger continued to pass through various owners until Emerson Lynn became publisher and editor in 1981.

Since 2002, the Messenger has received over 40 journalism awards in national, regional, and statewide competitions. In December 2018, Emerson and Suzanne Lynn sold it to Jim O'Rourke, owner of O'Rourke Media Group. Emerson Lynn continued to write Opinion pieces for the publication.

In January 2021, the paper announced it was reducing its publication from five days per week to two days.
