= Levi Underwood =

American politician (1821–1902)

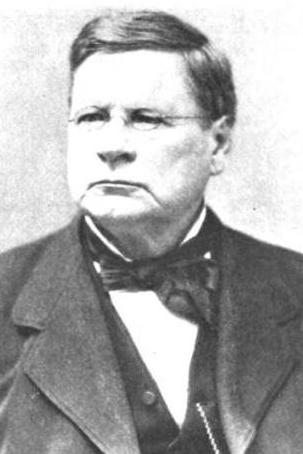

23rd Lieutenant Governor of Vermont
- In office 1860–1862
- Governor: Erastus Fairbanks; Frederick Holbrook
- Preceded by: Burnham Martin
- Succeeded by: Paul Dillingham

Member of the Burlington, Vermont Board of Aldermen from the North Ward
- In office 1865–1866 Serving with Lawrence Barnes
- Preceded by: None (position created)
- Succeeded by: Lawrence Barnes, John H. Worcester, John A. Arthur

Member of the Vermont Senate from Chittenden County
- In office 1856–1857 Serving with Martin Wires, Francis Wilson
- Preceded by: George W. Benedict, E. H. Wheeler, John Allen
- Succeeded by: Lucius E. Chittenden, Martin Wires, Francis Wilson

State's Attorney of Chittenden County, Vermont
- In office 1852–1854
- Preceded by: Aaron B. Maynard
- Succeeded by: Torrey E. Wales

Personal details
- Born: December 24, 1821 Hardwick, Vermont, US
- Died: March 11, 1902 (aged 80) Brattleboro, Vermont, US
- Resting place: Greenmount Cemetery, Burlington, Vermont
- Party: Democratic (before 1854); Republican (from 1854)
- Spouse: Cornelia Van Ness Chamberlain (m. 1851-1902, her death)
- Relations: Abel Underwood (uncle)
- Children: 6
- Occupation: Attorney

Levi Underwood (December 24, 1821 – March 11, 1902) was a lawyer and politician from Vermont. Originally a Democrat, Underwood's antislavery views caused him to join the new Republican Party when it was founded. Underwood was most notable for his service as the 23rd lieutenant governor of Vermont from 1860 to 1862.

A native of Hardwick, Vermont, Underwood was raised and educated in Hardwick, studied law, and attained admission to the bar in 1842. A longtime resident of Burlington, Underwood was also active in railroads, banking, and insurance. Originally a Democrat, he served in local offices including justice of the peace. He was State's Attorney of Chittenden County from 1852 to 1854. He joined the new Republican party at its founding, served as president of its 1856 state convention, and was a delegate to the 1856 Republican National Convention. In September 1856, Underwood was elected to a one-year term in the Vermont Senate, and he served from October 1856 to October 1857.

In 1860, Underwood was the successful Republican nominee for lieutenant governor. He was reelected in 1861, and served from October 1860 to October 1862. As lieutenant governor during the American Civil War, Underwood supported the Union war effort through efforts including subscription drives to raise money for equipping soldiers from Vermont. Underwood declined to become a candidate for reelection or any other office in 1862, and returned to his Burlington business and legal interests. When Burlington became a city in 1865, Underwood served a two-year term on its original board of aldermen.

Underwood retired in the mid-1880s, and lived at the Brattleboro Retreat. He died in Brattleboro on March 11, 1902. Underwood was buried at Greenmount Cemetery in Burlington.

== Early life ==
Levi Underwood was born in Hardwick, Vermont, on December 24, 1821, a son of Silas Underwood and Lucy (Leslie) Underwood. He was raised and educated in Hardwick, where his father served in local offices including selectman and justice of the peace, and which he represented in the Vermont House of Representatives. Underwood studied law with Luke P. Poland in Morrisville, attained admission to the bar in 1842, and moved to Burlington.

== Legal and business career ==
Underwood practiced law in Burlington, first in partnership with B. J. Tenney, and ultimately as a solo practitioner. In addition to practicing law, he was also involved in several businesses, including serving as a director and president of the Bank of Burlington. When the bank merged with the First National Bank of Burlington, Underwood served on First National's board of directors.

Underwood was also a director of the Champlain Mutual Fire Insurance Company, president of the Burlington Manufacturing Company, which manufactured flooring tiles, and president of the Burlington Board of Trade. In 1856, he was elected to the board of directors of the Vermont Central Railroad. In 1872, he was an original incorporator of the Winooski and Burlington Horse Railroad Company.

== Political career ==
=== Start of career ===
Underwood became active in politics as a member of the Democratic Party, and he served in local offices including justice of the peace. He was Chittenden County's State's Attorney from 1852 to 1854, elected by a coalition of Democrats and the Free Soil Party.

Underwood's anti-slavery views caused him to join the Republican Party at its founding, and he was president of the state party's 1856 state convention, and a delegate to the 1856 Republican National Convention. He was a member of the Vermont Senate from 1856 to 1857. During his senate term, Underwood was a member of the judiciary committee and the committee on joint rules. In addition, he was appointed to the committee that drafted the senate's response to the portion of the governor's annual message pertaining to the issue of slavery.

=== Lieutenant governor ===
In April 1860, Underwood was again chairman of the state Republican convention which met to choose delegates to the 1860 Republican National Convention. At the party's June meeting to nominate candidates for statewide office, the nominating committee considered three candidates for lieutenant governor—Underwood, William C. Kittredge, and Ebenezer N. Briggs. On the first ballot, Kittredge had 28 votes, Underwood 27, and Briggs 1. On the second, Underwood received 36 votes and the committee's endorsement, and the delegates unanimously accepted the nominating committee's report. In the September general election, Underwood defeated the Democratic nominee, Stephen Thomas, by a wide margin. He began his term in October 1861, and at the end of the legislative session in December, senators unanimously commended him for the tact and fairness he displayed as their presiding officer.

In early 1861, Underwood was appointed with Hiland Hall, Horace Henry Baxter, Lucius E. Chittenden, and Broughton Harris as Vermont's delegates to the Peace Conference of 1861, which unsuccessfully attempted to prevent the start of the American Civil War. After the war started, Underwood presided over the senate during its April 1861 session, at which the Vermont General Assembly and governor enacted measures to reorganize, equip, and train the state militia, and appropriate funds for these purposes. During the war, Underwood took part in pro-Union measures, including subscriptions to raise money for equipping Vermonters who volunteered for military service and reviewing troops at mobilization sites prior to their departure for the front lines.

In June 1861, the state Republican convention nominated Underwood for a second term as lieutenant governor. In the September general election, Underwood handily defeated Democrat Erasmus Plimpton. At the end of the 1861 legislative session in September, senators again unanimously passed a resolution commending Underwood for his performance as their presiding officer. He was not a candidate for reelection in 1862, in keeping with the Vermont Republican Party's "Mountain Rule".

== Later life ==
After leaving the lieutenant governor's office in October 1862, Underwood returned to his legal and business interests. In addition, he accepted an appointment as a commissioner of the United States District Court for the District of Vermont.

Underwood became active in Freemasonry when he was made a Master Mason at Burlington's Washington Lodge Number 3. He worked his way through the ranks of the Scottish Rite, and ultimately attained the 32nd degree. In 1887, he was appointed an honorary Member and Sovereign Inspector-General of the 33rd degree.

When Burlington was incorporated as a city in 1865, Underwood served a two-term on its first board of aldermen. He retired in 1885, after which he resided at the Brattleboro Retreat.

== Personal life ==
=== Family ===
In 1851, Underwood married Cornelia Van Ness Chamberlain. They were the parents of six children—Helen, Nancy, Corelia, Levi, Violet, and Thomas. Levi Underwood's uncle Abel Underwood served as U.S. Attorney for Vermont and a state circuit court judge.

=== Death and burial ===
Cornelia Underwood died on March 10, 1902, while in Brooklyn, New York visiting one of her daughters. Levi Underwood died in Brattleboro on March 11, just a few hours after the death of his wife. The funeral service for the Underwoods took place at the Cathedral Church of St. Paul in Burlington. They were buried at Greenmount Cemetery in Burlington.

=== Honors ===
In 1855, Underwood received the honorary degree of Master of Arts from the University of Vermont. In 1865, he received an honorary Master of Arts from Dartmouth College. During the American Civil War, the area in Burlington's Old North End which was known as the fairgrounds became the site of a military encampment for organizing and training Vermont units raised for the Union Army. This location, bordered by Blodgett Street, Pitkin Street, Manhattan Drive, and North Avenue was called Camp Underwood and was named in honor of Levi Underwood.

Party political offices
Preceded by Burnham Martin	Republican nominee for Lieutenant Governor of Vermont; 1860, 1861	Succeeded by Paul Dillingham
Political offices
Preceded by Burnham Martin	Lieutenant Governor of Vermont; 1860–1862	Succeeded by Paul Dillingham
