= Lucius E. Chittenden =

American author, banker, lawyer, politician and peace advocate (1824–1900)

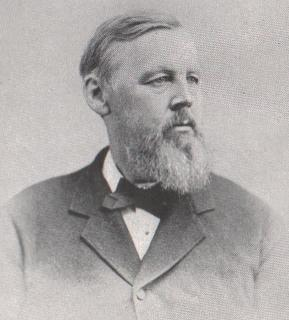

1st Register of the Treasury
- In office April 17, 1861 – August 10, 1864
- Appointed by: Salmon P. Chase
- President: Abraham Lincoln
- Preceded by: New position
- Succeeded by: Stoddard B. Colby

Member of the Vermont Senate from the Chittenden County district
- In office 1857–1860 Serving with Martin Wires, Francis Wilson (1857-1858); Edwin D. Mason, Josiah Tuttle (1858-1860)
- Preceded by: George W. Benedict, Elanson H. Wheeler, John Wheeler
- Succeeded by: John H. Woodward, Asahel Peck, Elmer Beecher

Personal details
- Born: May 24, 1824 Williston, Vermont, U.S.
- Died: July 22, 1900 (aged 76) Burlington, Vermont
- Resting place: Lakeview Cemetery, Burlington, Vermont, U.S.
- Party: Republican
- Other political affiliations: Free Soil Party

Lucius Eugene Chittenden (May 24, 1824 – July 22, 1900) was an American writer, banker, lawyer, politician and peace advocate who served as Register of the Treasury during the Lincoln administration.

== Early life ==
Chittenden was born in Williston, Vermont, the son of Giles (1790–1856) and Betsey (Hollenbeck) Chittenden. He was the grandson of Truman Chittenden (1770–1853), grand-nephew of Martin Chittenden, who served as governor of Vermont, and great-grandson of Vermont's first governor, Thomas Chittenden. Lucius Chittenden received his early education in the district schools of Williston and academies in Williston, Hinesburg and Cambridge. He studied law with several attorneys, and was admitted to the bar in Franklin County in 1844. He opened a law office in Burlington the next year. Beginning in the mid-1850s, he practiced in partnership with Daniel Roberts.

== Politics ==
He became interested in politics and public affairs early in his career, gained prominence in the anti-slavery movement and the Free Soil Party. From 1848 to 1851 he and E. A. Stansbury published the Free Soil Courier newspaper. After assisting the successful 1852 campaign of Democrat John S. Robinson for governor, he became active in the newly formed Republican Party. He was elected state senator from Chittenden County, and served from 1857 to 1860, while also serving as president of the Commercial Bank in Burlington.

== Civil War ==
In February 1861 Governor Erastus Fairbanks appointed Chittenden one of five Vermont delegates to the Washington Peace Conference, which met to try avert the start of the American Civil War. The other delegates were former Governor Hiland Hall, Levi Underwood, Horace Henry Baxter, and Broughton Harris. Chittenden was selected as recorder of the conference, and published its records in 1864.

In March 1861, President Lincoln's new Secretary of the Treasury, Salmon P. Chase, who had also been a member of the Free Soil Party, offered Chittenden the position of Register of the U.S. Treasury. Chittenden accepted, and served for most of Lincoln's first term until resigning in 1864 due to poor health.

During his term at the Treasury Department, Chittenden attracted notice when he worked to the point of exhaustion in order to ensure that a bond issue required to finance the Union war effort could be issued on time. The 12,500 bond certificates needed to be sent to England by steamship so they could be sold, and each certificate required Chittenden's signature. As a result, Chittenden stayed at his desk and signed certificates continuously over three days until the task was complete, ensuring that they could be shipped on time. Chittenden injured his hand and wrist in this work, which prompted him to resign as Register.

Chittenden was also credited with bringing to Lincoln's attention the case of William Scott, a Vermont soldier sentenced to death for sleeping on guard duty, and for whom Lincoln interceded by issuing a pardon. The event became part of Lincoln lore as the story of The Sleeping Sentinel, and Chittenden later published his account of the event.

== Later life ==
When he resigned from the Lincoln administration, he returned to Vermont to regain his health, but by 1866 was living in Tarrytown, New York, and practicing law in New York City while spending summers in Burlington. He returned to Burlington permanently in 1894, and died at the home of his daughter on July 22, 1900. He was buried at Lakeview Cemetery in Burlington.

== Family ==
Chittenden was married to Mary Hatch in 1856, and she died in 1894. They were the parents of three children: Horace H. became an attorney in New York City; Mary H. was the wife of William Bradford and a resident of Burlington; and Bessie B., the wife of Rev. Frederick Richards of New York City.

== Writings ==
- "Address before the 34th Reunion of the Reunion Society of Vermont Officers, November 5, 1897," at Bennington, Vermont. Proceedings of the Reunion Society of Vermont Officers Vol. II—1886-1905, Burlington, VT: Free Press Printing Company, 1906, pp. 222–237.
- "New Moneys of Lincoln's Administration. Their Origins, Growth, and Value." Harpers New Monthly Magazine, 81:1890.
- An Unknown Heroine; an historical episode of the war between the states. New York: Richmond, Croscup & Co., 1894.
- Invisible Siege: The Journal of Lucius E. Chittenden April 15, 1861 – July 14, 1861. San Diego: Americana Exchange Press, 1969.
- Lincoln and the Sleeping Sentinel – The True Story. New York: Harper & Brothers, 1909.
- Personal reminiscences, 1840–1890, including some not hitherto published of Lincoln and the war. New York: Richmond, Croscup & Co., 1893.
- Recollections of President Lincoln and his Administration. New York: Harper and Brothers. 1891.
- The Capture of Ticonderoga. Rutland, VT: Tuttle & Co., 1872.
- "The Character of the Early Settlers of Vermont Its Influence upon Posterity," delivered July 4, 1876, at Burlington, Vermont. Contained in Our National Centennial Jubilee: Orations, Addresses and Poems Delivered on the Fourth of July 1876. Ed. Frederick Saunders. (New York: E.B. Treat, 1877; reprint, St. Clair Shores, MI: Scholarly Press, 1976), pp. 499–521.
- The Law of Baron and Femme, of Parent and Child, Guardian and Ward . . . and of the Powers of the Courts of Chancery; With an Essay on the terms Heir, Heirs, and Heirs of the Body. Second Edition, with Notes, Burlington, VT: Chauncey Goodrich, 1846.
- A Report of the Debates and Proceedings in the Secret Sessions of the Conference Convention, for Proposing Amendments to the Constitution of the United States at Project Gutenberg, 1864.

== See also ==
- Vermont in the Civil War
