= Henry Keyes =

American politician

Member of the Vermont House of Representatives from Newbury
- In office 1855–1856
- Preceded by: James M. Chadwick
- Succeeded by: A. B. W. Tenney

Member of the Vermont Senate from Orange County
- In office 1847–1849 Serving with William Sweatt, Jefferson P. Kidder
- Preceded by: Levi B. Vilas, Reuben Page, Horace Fifield
- Succeeded by: J. W. D. Parker, S. Milton Bigelow, Stephen Thomas

Personal details
- Born: January 3, 1810 Vershire, Vermont, U.S.
- Died: September 24, 1870 (aged 60) Newbury, Vermont, U.S.
- Resting place: Oxbow Cemetery, Newbury, Vermont
- Party: Democratic
- Spouse(s): Sarah A. Pierce (m. 1838-1853, her death); Emma F. Pierce (m. 1856-1870, his death)
- Children: 5 (including Henry W. Keyes)
- Occupation: Businessman

Henry Keyes (January 3, 1810 – September 24, 1870) was a politician and railroad executive from Vermont. He was a member of the Vermont House of Representatives and Vermont Senate. He was also the Democratic nominee for governor three times (1856, 1857, 1858). In addition, Keyes served as president of the Atchison, Topeka and Santa Fe Railway.

== Early life ==
Keyes was born in Vershire, Vermont on January 3, 1810, the son of Thomas and Margaretta (McArthur) Keyes. He was raised and educated in Vershire, and moved to Newbury at age 15 to work at the Reed & Gould store. In 1831, he left Reed & Gould to go into business with his brother Freeman. The brothers operated the F. and H. Keyes Store, which became the largest general store in the Connecticut River Valley.

== Business and farming career ==
In addition to the store, Keyes was active in several other business ventures. In 1843, he was an original incorporator of the Connecticut and Passumpsic Rivers Railroad. Keyes served as a director and succeeded Erastus Fairbanks as president in 1854. Under Keyes's leadership, the railway completed a connection to the Grand Trunk Railway in 1870.

Keyes's other business interests included ownership stakes in Boston's United States Hotel as well as mines, steamboats and stagecoaches. Keyes was also a large shareholder in the Atchison, Topeka and Santa Fe Railway. He was appointed the company's president in February 1869.

He also owned and operated a farm that included land on both sides of the Connecticut River in Newbury and in Haverhill, New Hampshire, where he raised Durham cattle and Merino sheep. Keyes also served as president of the Vermont State Agricultural Society. From 1853 to 1855, Keyes served as a trustee of Norwich University.

== Political career ==
A Democrat, Keys represented Orange County in the Vermont Senate from 1847 to 1849. From 1855 to 1856, Keyes was Newbury's member of the Vermont House of Representatives.

In 1856, Keyes was the Democratic nominee for governor and lost to Republican nominee Ryland Fletcher. He ran again in 1857 and lost again to Fletcher, and was the unsuccessful Democratic nominee in 1858, losing to Hiland Hall.

Keyes was the chairman of the Vermont delegation to the 1860 Democratic National Convention. The delegates met in Charleston, South Carolina in April and were unable to agree on a presidential nominee. The convention reconvened in Baltimore, Maryland in June and nominated Stephen A. Douglas.

== Death ==
In mid-September 1870, Keyes became ill. He died in Newbury on September 24. Keyes was buried at Oxbow Cemetery in Newbury.

== Family ==
In May 1838, Keyes married Sarah A. Pierce of Stanstead, Quebec. They had no children and she died in 1853. In May 1856, Keyes married Emma F. Pierce, a sister of his first wife. They were the parents of five children—Henry, Martha, Ezra, George, and Charles.

Keyes's son, Henry W. Keyes (1863–1938), became Governor of New Hampshire in 1917. In 1918, he was elected to the U.S. senator in 1919.

Party political offices
Preceded by Merritt Clark	Democratic nominee for Governor of Vermont; 1856, 1857, 1858	Succeeded by John Godfrey Saxe
Business positions
Preceded by Henry C. Lord	President of the Atchison, Topeka and Santa Fe Railway; 1869-1870	Succeeded by Ginery Twichell
Preceded by Erastus Fairbanks	President of the Connecticut Passumpsic Rivers Railroad Company; 1854-1870	Succeeded by Emmons Raymond
Preceded by John Gregory	President of the Vermont State Agricultural Society; 1869-1870	Succeeded by Henry G. Root
