= 1856 Vermont gubernatorial election =

- September 2, 1856
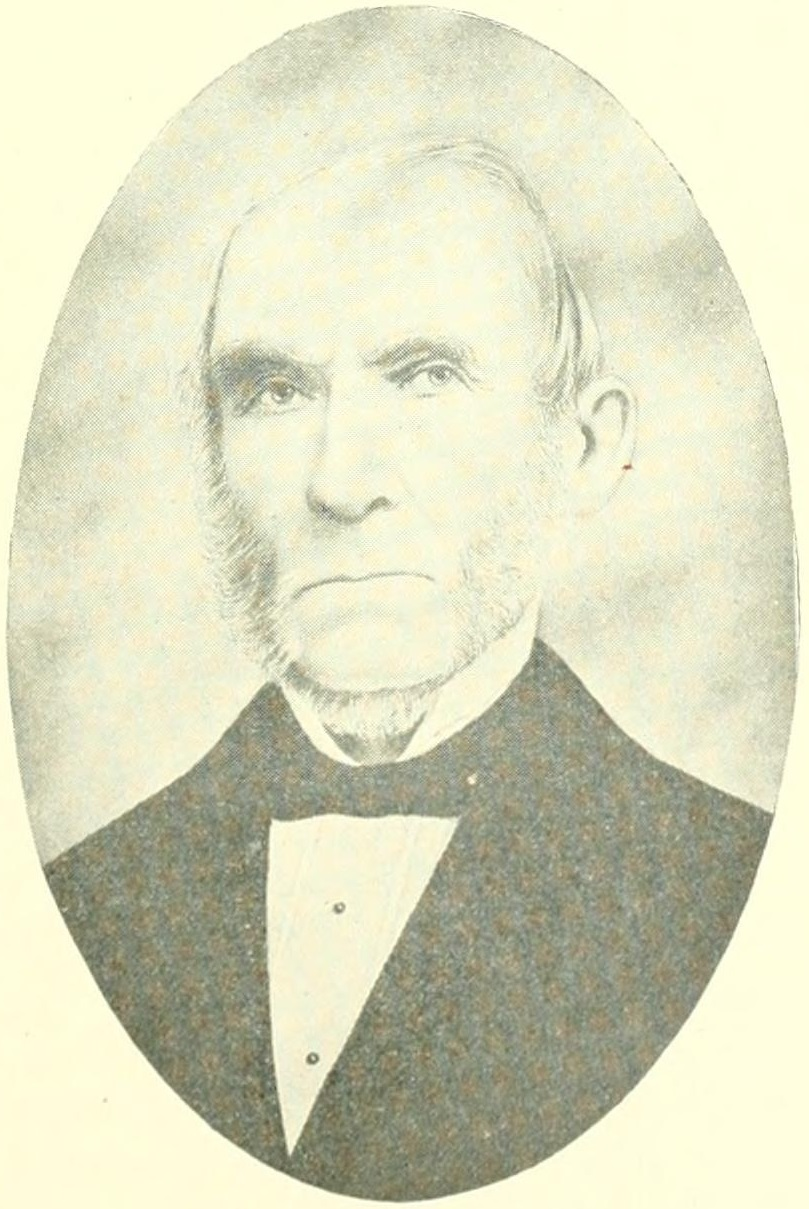
| Nominee | Ryland Fletcher | Henry Keyes |
| Party | Republican | Democratic |
| Popular vote | 34,052 | 11,661 |
| Percentage | 74.05% | 25.36% |
- County results Fletcher: 60–70% 70–80% 80–90%
Governor before election
Stephen Royce
Republican
Elected Governor
Ryland Fletcher
Republican

The 1856 Vermont gubernatorial election for governor of Vermont was held on Tuesday, September 2. In keeping with the "Mountain Rule", incumbent Republican Stephen Royce was not a candidate for a third one-year term. The Republican nomination was won by Ryland Fletcher, the incumbent lieutenant governor. The Democratic nominee was Henry Keyes, a former member of the Vermont House of Representatives and Vermont Senate.

Vermont continued its strong support for abolitionism and Republicans, and Fletcher was easily elected to succeed Royce. Fletcher took the oath of office for a one-year term that began on October 17.

== General election ==
=== Results ===
1856 Vermont gubernatorial election
| Party | Candidate | Votes | % | ±% |
|---|---|---|---|---|
| Republican | Ryland Fletcher | 34,052 | 74.05 | |
| Democratic | Henry Keyes | 11,661 | 25.36 | |
| | Scattering | 270 | 0.59 | |
| Total votes | | 45,983 | 100.0 | |
