= John Godfrey Saxe =

American poet (1816–1887)

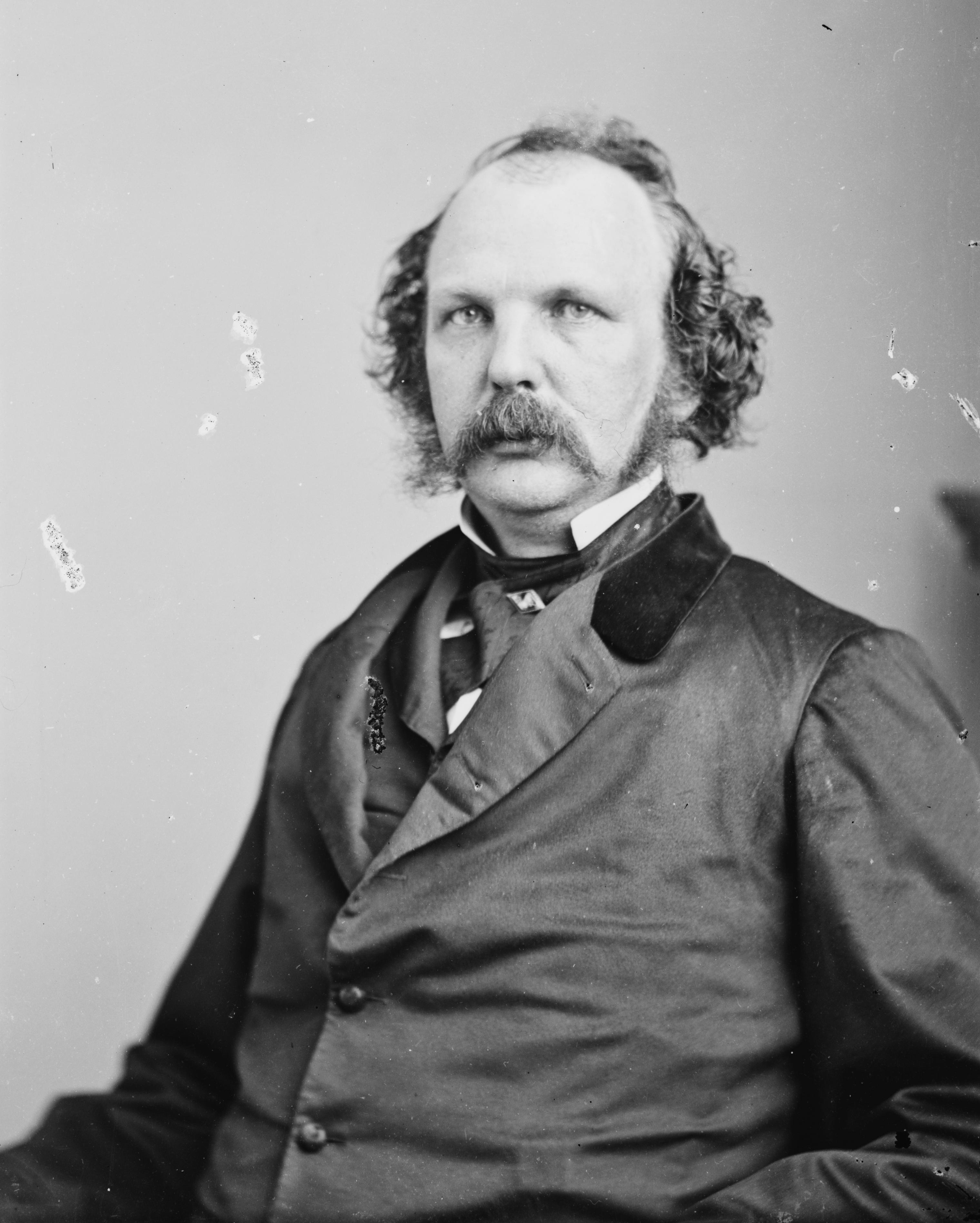
- Mathew Brady–Handy photograph, c. 1855–1865

State's Attorney of Chittenden County, Vermont
- In office 1850–1852
- Preceded by: Hector Adams
- Succeeded by: Levi Underwood

Personal details
- Born: June 2, 1816 Highgate, Vermont, U.S.
- Died: March 31, 1887 (aged 71) Albany, New York, U.S.
- Resting place: Green-Wood Cemetery, Brooklyn, New York, U.S.
- Party: Democratic
- Spouse: Sophia Newell Sollace (m. 1841)
- Relations: John Godfrey Saxe II (grandson)
- Children: 6 (including John Theodore Saxe)
- Education: Middlebury College
- Occupation: Attorney; Poet; Public lecturer

John Godfrey Saxe I (June 2, 1816 – March 31, 1887) was an American poet known for his re-telling of the Indian parable "Blind men and an elephant", which introduced the story to a western audience.

== Biography ==
Saxe was born in 1816 in Highgate, Vermont, at Saxe's Mills, where his grandfather, John Saxe (Johannes Sachse), a German immigrant and Loyalist, built the area's first gristmill in 1786. Saxe was the son of Peter Saxe – miller, judge and periodic member of the Vermont House of Representatives – and Elizabeth Jewett of Weybridge, Vermont. Saxe was named for two of his paternal uncles, John and Godfrey, who had died as young men before his birth. Raised in a strict Methodist home, Saxe was first sent, in 1835, to Wesleyan University, which he left after a year, and then to Middlebury College, from which he graduated in 1839.

In 1841, he married Sophia Newell Sollace, a sister of a Middlebury classmate, with whom he had six children, including John Theodore Saxe.

He was admitted to the Vermont bar in 1843 and tried to run a business with his dutiful and pious older brother, Charles Jewett Saxe. For some years, he practiced successfully in Franklin County. In 1850–51, he served as state's attorney for Chittenden County.

Bored by his legal work, Saxe began publishing poems for The Knickerbocker, of which "The Rhyme of the Rail" is his most famous early work. He soon caught the attention of the prominent Boston publishing house Ticknor and Fields. Though he received no royalties for his first volume, it ran to ten reprintings. He became a solid performer for Ticknor and Fields, though his sales ranked far behind those of his friend, Henry Wadsworth Longfellow. His poem "The Puzzled Census-Taker" amused many, and "Rhyme of the Rail" was possibly the most admired poem of the period about rail travel. Saxe was editor of the Sentinel in Burlington, Vermont from 1850 to 1856.

Saxe became a sought-after speaker, toured frequently and stayed prolific throughout the 1850s. In 1859 and 1860, he ran unsuccessfully for governor of Vermont. As a northern Democrat, he advocated a non-interference policy on slavery and supported Illinois senator Stephen A. Douglas's policy of "popular sovereignty", a position which rendered the poet extremely unpopular in Republican Vermont. After his second and even more punishing electoral defeat, Saxe left his home state in 1861 for Albany, New York. Convinced extremists on both sides had pushed the nation into a fratricidal war, he composed "The Blind Man and The Elephant", his most famous poem. Saxe never fully embraced abolition, opposed the enfranchisement of black voters, and became a critic of the federal policy on Reconstruction. He was one of the featured speakers at a mass rally in Manhattan in September 1866 opposing Reconstruction. His views clashed with those of his older brother, who had served in the New York Assembly as a War Democrat.

Saxe spent his summers in Saratoga, contributed articles for the Albany Evening Journal and Albany Morning Argus, and published poems in Harper's Magazine, The Atlantic, and The Ledger, and remained popular on the lecture circuit. "The Proud Miss McBride" and "Song of Saratoga" were some of famous works in this period. However, his attempts to re-enter politics remained unsuccessful.

Always mercurial, Saxe became more erratic following the death of his oldest brother in 1867. He was not temperamentally suited to assume the role of head of the family. Instead, the poet's son, John Theodore Saxe, took the reins of his brother's lumber firm and managed the family's finances. In the 1870s, while he was living in Carroll Gardens, Brooklyn, a series of woes befell Saxe. His youngest daughter died of tuberculosis. In 1875, he suffered head injuries in a rail accident near Wheeling, West Virginia, from which he never fully recovered, and then over the next several years, his two other daughters, his eldest son, and daughter-in-law also died of tuberculosis. In July 31, 1880, his wife died of bronchitis. Including a young son who died in the 1840s, Saxe had lost five of his six children as well as his wife.

Saxe sank deep into depression and spent his final years in Albany to live with his last surviving child, Charles Gordon Saxe. His decline from the rollicking poet to grieving recluse earned the sympathy of the people of Albany, and when he died in 1887, the New York State Assembly ordered his likeness to be chiseled into the "poet's corner" of the Great Western Staircase in the New York State Capitol.

== Legacy ==
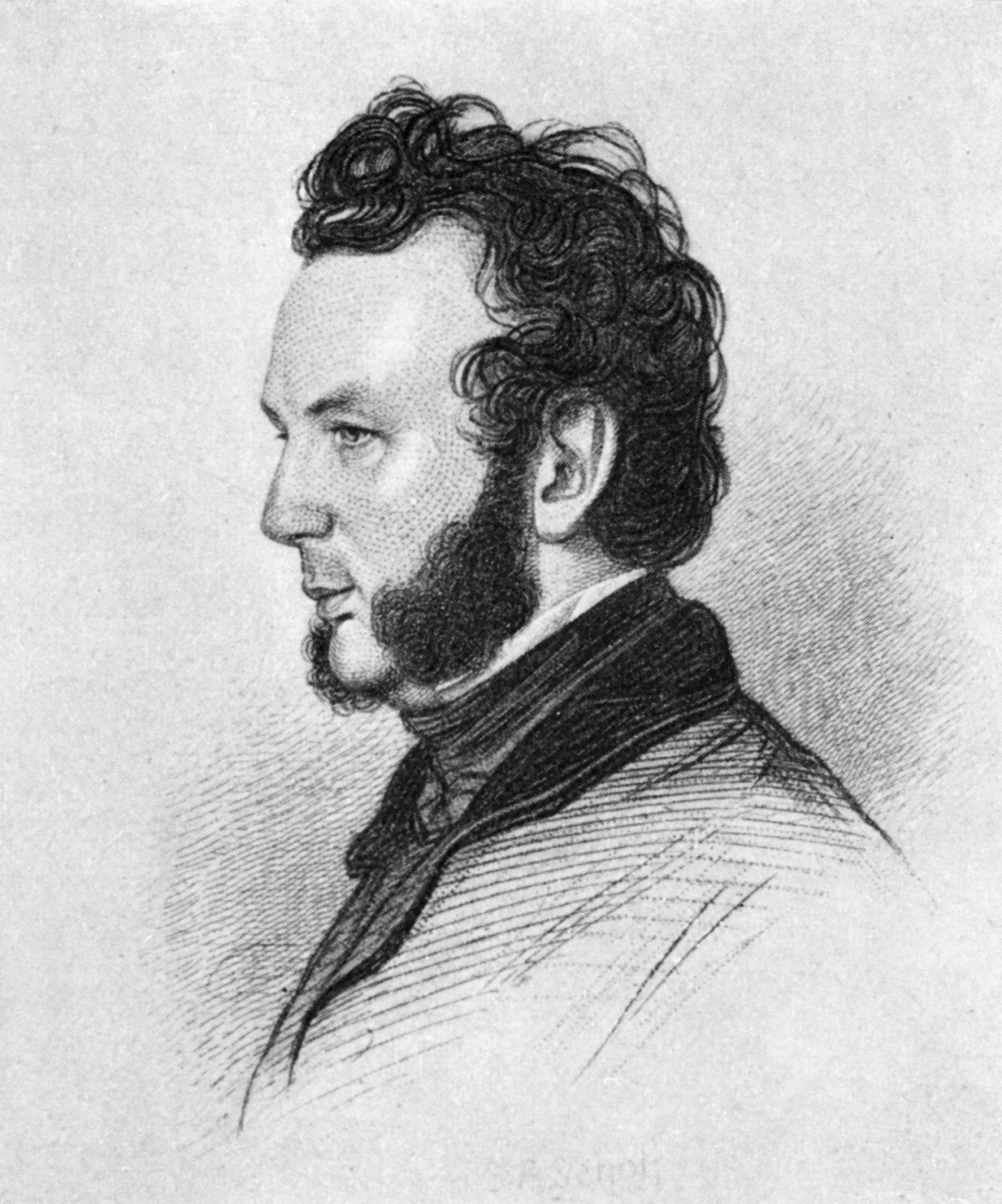
Saxe at age 32

His best remembered poem "The Blind Men and the Elephant", a version of the ancient tale Blind men and an elephant, was not his most famous in his day. Though a satirist, his poems written during more somber periods earned more recognition, including "Little Jerry the Miller", about his father's mill assistant; few of the satirical works which had made him famous are read today.

The poet's orphaned grandson, John Godfrey Saxe II, became a New York state senator, President of the New York Bar, and counsel of Columbia University.

According to Fred R. Shapiro, author of the Yale Book of Quotations, The Daily Cleveland Herald, in its issue of March 29, 1869, quotes Saxe as saying, "Laws, like sausages, cease to inspire respect in proportion as we know how they are made."

== Partial bibliography ==
- The Poems of John Godfrey Saxe (many editions)
- Progress : a satire (1847)
- Table Rock Album and Sketches Of the Falls and Scenery Adjacent (1848)
- The proud Miss MacBride,: a legend of Gotham (1850)
- The money-king and other poems (1859)
- Clever stories of many nations, rendered in rhyme (1855)
- The Masquerade and other poems (1866)
- Leisure-Day Rhymes (1875)
- The poetical works of John Godfrey Saxe: Household Edition: with illustrations (1889)

== See also ==
- The Blind Men and the Elephant on Wikisource
- Elephant test
- John Godfrey Saxe II

Party political offices
Preceded by Henry Keyes	Democratic nominee for Governor of Vermont; 1859	Succeeded by Benjamin H. Smalley
