= 1858 Vermont gubernatorial election =

- September 7, 1858
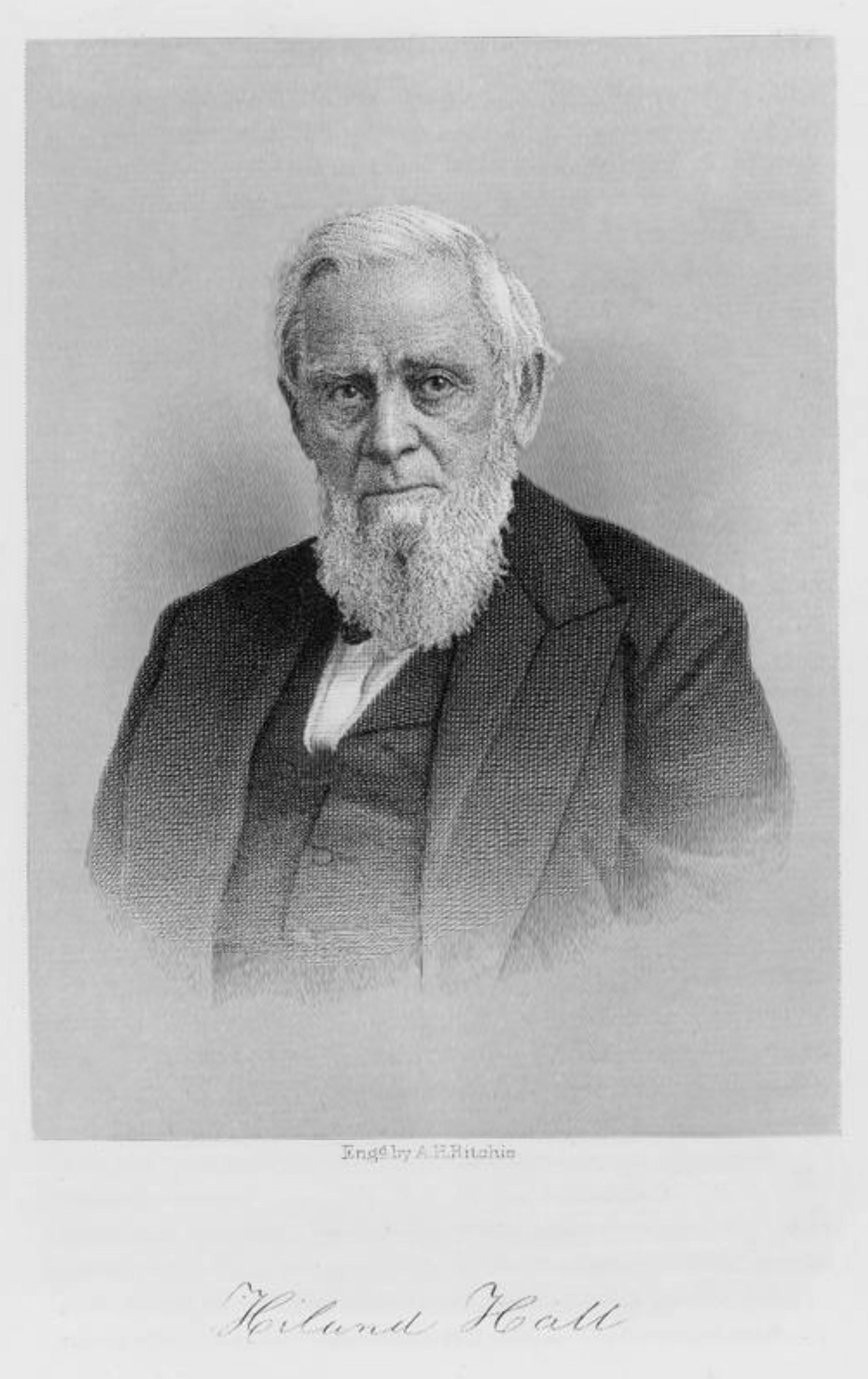
Nominee	Hiland Hall	Henry Keyes
Party	Republican	Democratic
Popular vote	29,660	13,338
Percentage	68.69%	30.89%
- County results Hall: 50–60% 60–70% 70–80% 80–90%
Governor before election
Ryland Fletcher
Republican
Elected Governor
Hiland Hall
Republican

The 1858 Vermont gubernatorial election for governor of Vermont was held on Tuesday, September 7. In keeping with the "Mountain Rule", incumbent Republican Ryland Fletcher was not a candidate for a third one-year term. The Republican nominee was Hiland Hall. The Democratic nominee was Henry Keyes, who was also the Democratic nominee in 1856 and 1857.

Vermont continued to strongly support abolitionism and the Republican Party, and Hall was easily elected. Hall took the oath of office for a one-year term that began on October 14.

== General election ==
=== Results ===
1858 Vermont gubernatorial election
Party	Candidate	Votes	%	±%
Republican	Hiland Hall	29,660	68.69	
Democratic	Henry Keyes	13,338	30.89	
	Scattering	182	0.42	
Total votes		43,180	100.0	
