= Burnham Martin =

American politician (1811–1882)

22nd Lieutenant Governor of Vermont
- In office 1858–1860
- Governor: Hiland Hall
- Preceded by: James M. Slade
- Succeeded by: Levi Underwood

Member of the Vermont Senate from Orange County
- In office 1866–1868 Serving with Hiram Barrett
- Preceded by: John B. Hutchinson, Samuel C. Clement
- Succeeded by: Roswell Farnham, James Hutchinson Jr.

Member of the Vermont House of Representatives from Chelsea
- In office 1876–1878
- Preceded by: Asa A. Goodwin
- Succeeded by: Alvah Whitney
- In office 1857–1858
- Preceded by: Harry Lincoln
- Succeeded by: William Hebard

Member of the Ohio Senate from Greene, Fayette, and Clinton Counties
- In office 1845–1847
- Preceded by: John M. Barrere
- Succeeded by: Franklin Corwin

Member of the Ohio House of Representatives from Adams, Highland, and Fayette Counties
- In office 1843–1844 Serving with Hugh Means
- Preceded by: Abraham A. Lowman, John A. Smith
- Succeeded by: Robert Dobbins

Personal details
- Born: Ebenezer Burnham Martin; August 10, 1811 Williamstown, Vermont, U.S.
- Died: November 17, 1882 (aged 71) Chelsea, Vermont, U.S.
- Resting place: West Hill Cemetery, Williamstown, Vermont, U.S.
- Party: Republican
- Other political affiliations: Whig (before 1854)
- Spouse(s): Christina Ann Brotts (m. 1834); Sally Ann "Anna" (Smith) Bishop
- Children: 1
- Profession: Attorney

Burnham Martin (August 10, 1811 – November 17, 1882) was a Vermont lawyer, farmer and politician who served as the 22nd lieutenant governor of Vermont from 1858 to 1860.

== Early life ==
Burnham Martin was born in Williamstown, Vermont on August 10, 1811. He was trained as a saddler and worked in Saratoga Springs, New York and Fayette County, Ohio in the 1830s and 1840s, also teaching school and studying law. After attaining admission to the bar, Martin joined the Whigs and served as Fayette County State's Attorney from 1841 to 1843. He was a member of the Ohio House of Representatives from 1843 to 1845, and he served in the Ohio Senate from 1845 to 1847.

Martin subsequently returned to Vermont. He settled in Chelsea, where he practiced law and farmed, also serving in local offices for most of his life, including Chelsea Justice of the Peace, Orange County State's Attorney from 1849 to 1850 and 1853, and County Clerk from 1857 to 1858.

== Political career ==
In 1857 Martin represented Chelsea in the Vermont House of Representatives.

He was elected Lieutenant Governor as a Republican and served from 1858 to 1860.

Martin served in the Vermont Senate from 1866 to 1868.

From 1872 until his death he served as Chelsea's Town Clerk. From 1876 to 1878, Martin served again in the Vermont House of Representatives.

== Later life ==
Martin was a member of the Bennington Battle Monument Commission and was active in the Orange County Agricultural Society, serving as its Secretary.

== Death and burial ==
Burnham Martin died in Chelsea on November 17, 1882. He was buried in Williamstown's West Hill Cemetery.

== Other ==
In 1867 at a speech at the agricultural fair in Tunbridge, Vermont, Martin described the event as a "little World's Fair". This name was soon adopted as the official name of the annual fair that is still held to this day. This event is recorded on a historical marker on the edge of the fairgrounds in Tunbridge.

Martin's first name appears variously as "Burnham" or "Burnam." It is spelled "Burnham" on his gravestone.

== Gallery ==
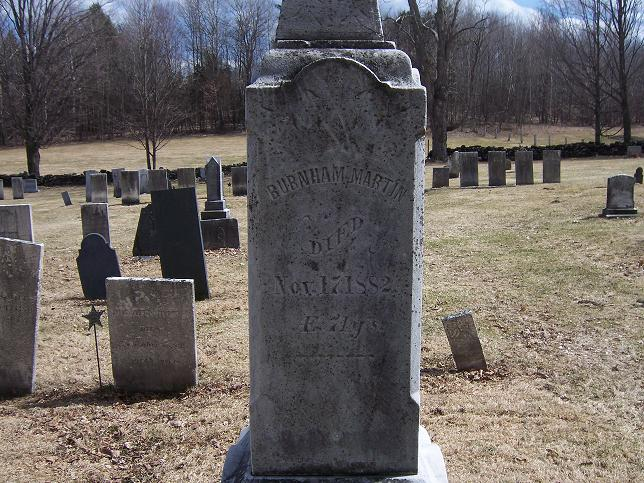
Gravestone, 1 of 2

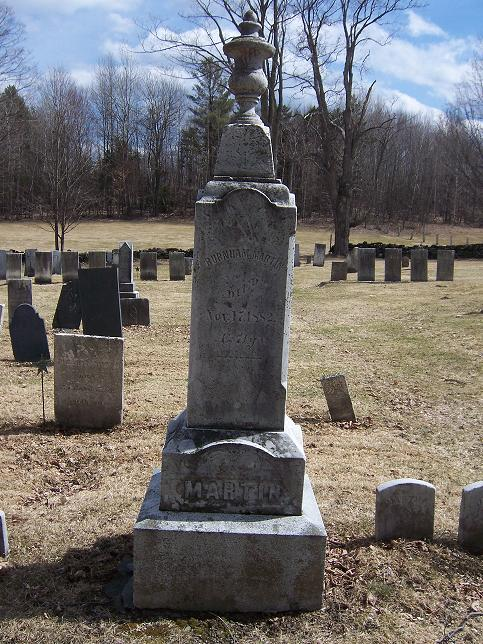
Gravestone, 2 of 2

Party political offices
Preceded by James M. Slade	Republican nominee for Lieutenant Governor of Vermont; 1858, 1859	Succeeded by Levi Underwood
Political offices
Preceded by James M. Slade	Lieutenant Governor of Vermont; 1858–1860	Succeeded by Levi Underwood
