= James M. Slade =

American politician

James Madison Slade (September 8, 1812 – April 10, 1875) was a Vermont politician who served as the 21st lieutenant governor of Vermont from 1856 to 1857.

== Biography ==
The son of Governor William Slade, James Madison Slade was born in Middlebury, Vermont on September 8, 1812. He was raised and educated in Middlebury and became a dry goods merchant.

Active in politics as a member of the American Party, also called the Know Nothings, and later as a member of the Republican Party, Slade was Clerk of the Vermont House of Representatives from 1853 to 1856. From 1856 to 1857 he was Vermont's Lieutenant Governor.

Slade was employed by the United States Department of the Treasury in Washington, D.C. from 1860 to 1863

From 1868 to 1870 Slade served as one of Addison County's Assistant Judges, and he was a member of the Vermont House from 1871 to 1872.

Slade died in Middlebury on April 10, 1875 and was buried in Middlebury's West Cemetery.

== Family ==
Slade's son James M. Slade, Jr. (1843-1899) became a lawyer who served as Addison County State's Attorney and Probate Judge and as a member of the Vermont House of Representatives. From 1870 to 1871 the younger Slade was Secretary of Civil and Military Affairs, or chief assistant, to Governor John Wolcott Stewart.

Party political offices
First	Know Nothing nominee for Governor of Vermont; 1855	Succeeded by None
Preceded by Ryland Fletcher	Republican nominee for Lieutenant Governor of Vermont; 1856, 1857	Succeeded by Burnham Martin
Political offices
Preceded by Ryland Fletcher	Lieutenant Governor of Vermont; 1856–1858	Succeeded by Burnham Martin
