= Peace Conference of 1861 =

Meeting to prevent the impending American Civil War

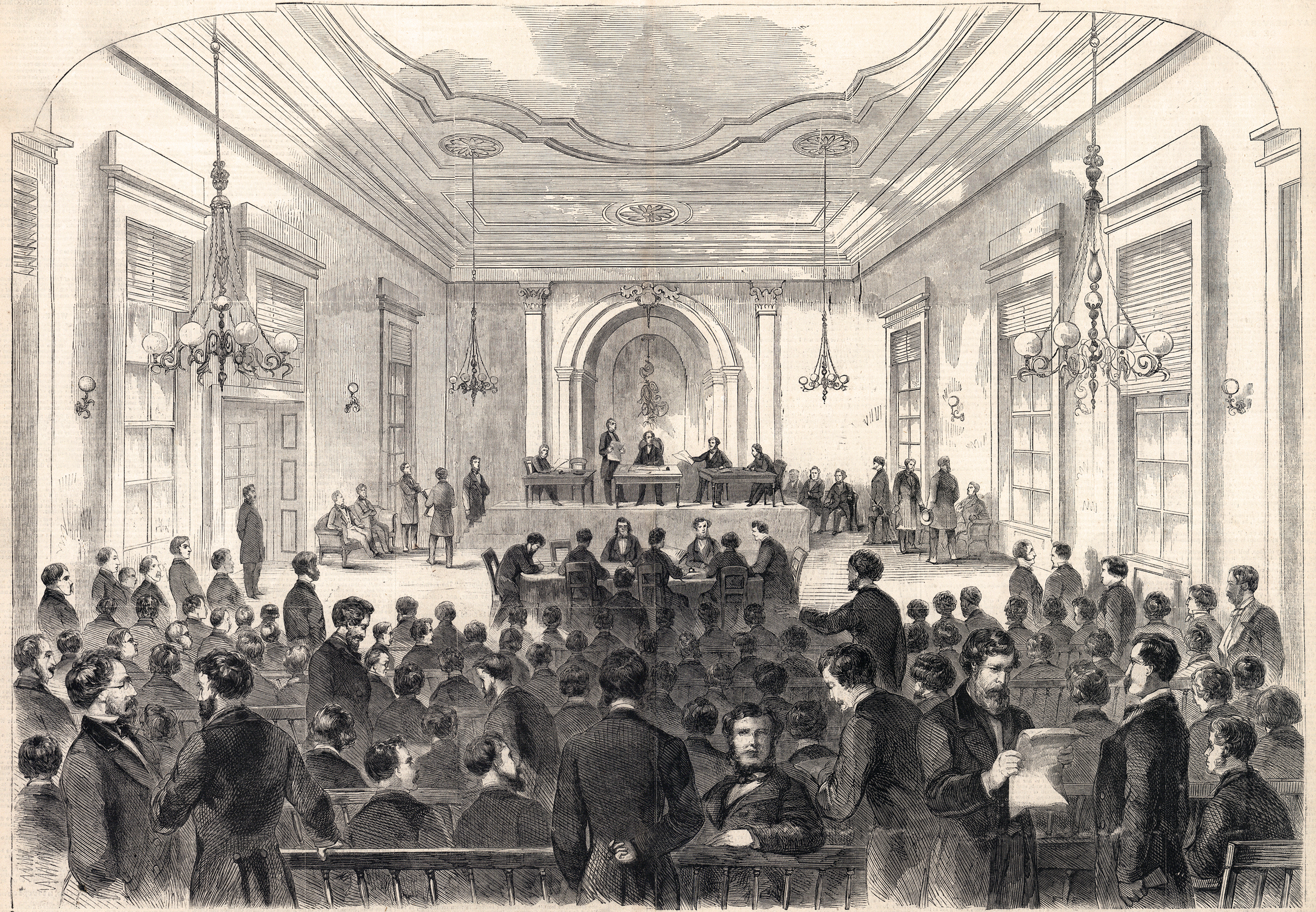
Delegates at the opening of the Peace Conference of 1861 from Frank Leslie's Illustrated Newspaper, February 16, 1861.

The Peace Conference of 1861 was a meeting of 131 leading American politicians in February 1861, at the Willard Hotel in Washington, D.C., on the eve of the American Civil War. The conference's purpose was to avoid, if possible, the secession of the eight slave states from the upper and border South that had not done so as of that date. The seven states that had already seceded did not attend.

== Background ==
Before the 1860 election, Republicans were excitedly predicting the end of slavery even in the South. Republican President Abraham Lincoln's election in 1860 led many in the South to conclude that now was the time for their long-discussed secession. Many pro-slavery Southerners, especially in the Lower South, were convinced that the new Republican government was determined to abolish slavery where it already existed.

In much of the South, elections were held to select delegates to special conventions to consider secession from the Union. In Congress, efforts were made in both the House of Representatives and the Senate to compromise over the issues relating to slavery dividing the nation.

== Four proposals to preserve the Union ==
=== First Crittenden proposal: six constitutional amendments ===
In December 1860, the final session of the Thirty-sixth Congress met. In the House, the Committee of Thirty-Three, with one member from each state, led by Ohio Republican Thomas Corwin, was formed to reach a compromise to preserve the Union. In the Senate, former Kentucky Whig John J. Crittenden, elected as a Unionist candidate, submitted the Crittenden Compromise, six proposed constitutional amendments and four resolutions that would guarantee the permanent existence of slavery in the slave states and that Crittenden hoped would address all the outstanding issues. Hopes were high, especially in the border states, that the lame duck Congress could reach a successful resolution before the new Republican administration took office.

Crittenden's proposals were debated by a specially selected Committee of Thirteen. The proposals provided for, among other things, an extension of the Missouri Compromise line dividing the territories to the Pacific Ocean, bringing his efforts directly in conflict with the 1860 Republican Platform and the personal views of President-elect Abraham Lincoln, who had made known his objections. The committee rejected the compromise on December 22 by a 7–6 vote. Crittenden later brought the issue to the floor of the Senate as a proposal to make his compromise subject to a national referendum. Still, the Senate rejected it on January 16 by 25–23.

=== Second Crittenden proposal ===
A modified version of the Crittenden Plan, believed to be more attractive to Republicans, was considered by an ad hoc committee of 14 congressmen from the lower North and the upper South, meeting several times between December 28 and January 4. The committee was chaired again by Crittenden and included other Southern Unionists such as Representatives John A. Gilmer of North Carolina, Robert H. Hatton of Tennessee, J. Morrison Harris of Maryland, and John T. Harris of Virginia. The House rejected a version of their work on January 7.

=== Constitutional amendment protecting slavery ===
In the House, on January 14, the Committee of Thirty-Three reported that it had reached a majority agreement on a constitutional amendment to protect slavery where it existed and the immediate admission of New Mexico Territory as a slave state. This latter proposal would have resulted in a de facto extension of the Missouri Compromise line for existing territories.

=== Proposal from Virginia to hold a peace conference ===
A fourth attempt came from Virginia, a slave state that had not yet seceded. Former President John Tyler, now a private citizen of Virginia, had been appointed as a special Virginia envoy to President James Buchanan to urge him to maintain the status quo regarding the seceded states. Later, Tyler was an elected delegate to the Virginia convention called to consider whether to follow the Deep South states out of the Union. Tyler thought a final collective effort should be made to preserve the Union. In a document published on January 17, 1861, he called for a convention of the six free and six slave border states to resolve the sectional split. Governor John Letcher of Virginia had already made a similar request to the state legislature. He agreed to sponsor the convention while the list of attendees to all states was expanded. Corwin agreed to hold off any final vote on his House plan, pending the final actions of the peace conference.

== The Peace Conference ==
The conference convened on February 4, 1861, at the Willard Hotel in Washington, D.C.; all seven Deep South states (Alabama, Florida, Georgia, Louisiana, Mississippi, South Carolina, and Texas) had already passed ordinances of secession, were preparing to form a new government in Montgomery, Alabama, and did not attend the peace conference, believing it would not accomplish anything significant. At the same time that Tyler, selected to head the convention, was making his opening remarks in Washington, his granddaughter was ceremonially hoisting the flag for the Confederate convention in Montgomery. No delegates were sent by the Deep South states or by Arkansas, Michigan, Wisconsin, Minnesota, California, or Oregon. Fourteen free states and seven slave states (Delaware, Kentucky, Maryland, Missouri, North Carolina, Tennessee, and Virginia) were represented. Among the representatives to the conference were James A. Seddon and William Cabell Rives from Virginia, David Wilmot from Pennsylvania, Francis Granger from New York, Reverdy Johnson from Maryland, William P. Fessenden and Lot M. Morrill from Maine, James Guthrie and William O. Butler from Kentucky, David S. Reid from North Carolina, Stephen T. Logan from Illinois, Alvan Cullom from Tennessee, and Thomas Ewing and Salmon P. Chase from Ohio. Although Louisiana did not send delegates, Rep. John Edward Bouligny, the only member of the state's congressional delegation not to resign his seat, did participate in the conference.

Delegates to the 1860 Peace Convention, Washington, D.C.
Delegate	State
Roger S. Baldwin	Connecticut
Robbins Battell	Connecticut
Chauncey F. Cleveland	Connecticut
Charles J. McCurdy	Connecticut
James T. Pratt	Connecticut
Amos S. Treat	Connecticut
Daniel M. Bates	Delaware
William Cannon	Delaware
John W. Houston	Delaware
Henry Ridgeley	Delaware
George B. Rodney	Delaware
Burton C. Cook	Illinois
Stephen T. Logan	Illinois
John M. Palmer	Illinois
Thomas J. Turner	Illinois
John Wood	Illinois
E. W. H. Ellis	Indiana
Pleasant A. Hackleman	Indiana
Godlove S. Orth	Indiana
Thomas C. Slaughter	Indiana
Caleb B. Smith	Indiana
Samuel R. Curtis	Iowa
James W. Grimes	Iowa
James Harlan	Iowa
William Vandever	Iowa
Henry J. Adams	Kansas
Martin F. Conway	Kansas
J. C. Stone	Kansas
Thomas Ewing Jr.	Kansas
Joshua F. Bell	Kentucky
William O. Butler	Kentucky
James B. Clay	Kentucky
James Guthrie	Kentucky
Charles S. Morehead	Kentucky
Charles A. Wickliffe	Kentucky
Stephen Coburn	Maine
William P. Fessenden	Maine
Stephen C. Foster	Maine
Ezra B. French	Maine
Lot M. Morrill	Maine
Freeman H. Morse	Maine
John J. Perry	Maine
Daniel E. Somes	Maine
Augustus W. Bradford	Maryland
John Crisfield	Maryland
John F. Dent	Maryland
William T. Goldsborough	Maryland
Benjamin C. Howard	Maryland
Reverdy Johnson	Maryland
James Dixon Roman	Maryland
Charles Allen	Massachusetts
George S. Boutwell	Massachusetts
Theophilus P. Chandler	Massachusetts
Francis B. Crowninshield	Massachusetts
John M. Forbes	Massachusetts
John Z. Goodrich	Massachusetts
Richard P. Waters	Massachusetts
Aylett H. Buckner	Missouri
John D. Coalter	Missouri
Alexander W. Doniphan	Missouri
Harrison Hough	Missouri
Waldo P. Johnson	Missouri
Levi Chamberlain	New Hampshire
Asa Fowler	New Hampshire
Amos Tuck	New Hampshire
William C. Alexander	New Jersey
Frederick T. Frelinghuysen	New Jersey
Charles Smith Olden	New Jersey
Rodman M. Price	New Jersey
Joseph F. Randolph	New Jersey
Robert F. Stockton	New Jersey
Thomas J. Stryker	New Jersey
Peter D. Vroom	New Jersey
Benjamin Williamson	New Jersey
Greene C. Bronson	New York
Erastus Corning	New York
William E. Dodge	New York
David D. Field	New York
Addison Gardiner	New York
Francis Granger	New York
Amaziah B. James	New York
John A. King	New York
William Curtis Noyes	New York
James C. Smith	New York
James S. Wadsworth	New York
John E. Wool	New York
Daniel M. Barringer	North Carolina
George Davis	North Carolina
J. M. Morehead	North Carolina
David S. Reid	North Carolina
Thomas Ruffin	North Carolina
Franklin T. Backus	Ohio
Salmon P. Chase	Ohio
Thomas Ewing	Ohio
William S. Groesbeck	Ohio
Reuben Hitchcock	Ohio
Valentine B. Horton	Ohio
Christopher Wolcott	Ohio
John C. Wright	Ohio
Thomas E. Franklin	Pennsylvania
Andrew W. Loomis	Pennsylvania
William McKennan	Pennsylvania
William M. Meredith	Pennsylvania
James Pollock	Pennsylvania
Thomas White	Pennsylvania
David Wilmot	Pennsylvania
Samuel Ames	Rhode Island
Samuel G. Arnold	Rhode Island
George H. Browne	Rhode Island
Alexander Duncan	Rhode Island
William W. Hoppin	Rhode Island
Josiah M. Anderson	Tennessee
Robert L. Caruthers	Tennessee
Alvan Cullom	Tennessee
Isaac R. Hawkins	Tennessee
William P. Hickerson	Tennessee
George W. Jones	Tennessee
Thomas Martin	Tennessee
R. J. McKinney	Tennessee
Samuel Milligan	Tennessee
William H. Stephens	Tennessee
A. W. O. Totten	Tennessee
Felix K. Zollicoffer	Tennessee
H. Henry Baxter	Vermont
L. E. Chittenden	Vermont
Hiland Hall	Vermont
B. D. Harris	Vermont
Levi Underwood	Vermont
John W. Brockenbrough	Virginia
William C. Rives	Virginia
James A. Seddon	Virginia
George W. Summers	Virginia
John Tyler	Virginia

Many of the delegates came in the belief that they could be successful, but many others, from both sides of the spectrum, came simply as "watchdogs" for their sectional interests. The 131 delegates included "six former cabinet members, nineteen ex-governors, fourteen former senators, fifty former representatives, twelve state supreme court justices, and one former president", and the meeting was frequently referred to derisively as the Old Gentleman's Convention.

On February 6, a committee was formed, charged with drafting a proposal for the entire convention to consider. The committee consisted of one representative from each state and was headed by James Guthrie of Kentucky. The convention met for three weeks, and its final product was a proposed seven-point constitutional amendment that differed little from the Crittenden Compromise. The key issue, slavery in the territories, was addressed simply by extending the Missouri Compromise line to the Pacific Ocean, with no provision for newly acquired territory. That section passed by a 9–8 vote of the states, each with one vote.

Other features of the proposed constitutional amendment were the requirement for the acquisition of all future territories to be approved by a majority of both the slave states and the free states, a prohibition on Congress passing any legislation that would affect the status of slavery where it currently existed, a prohibition on state legislatures from passing laws that would restrict the ability of officials to apprehend and return fugitive slaves, a permanent prohibition on the foreign slave trade, and 100% compensation to any master whose fugitive slave was freed by illegal mob action or intimidation of officials required to administer the Fugitive Slave Act. Key sections of this amendment could be further amended only with the unanimous concurrence of all states.

== Aftermath ==
Since it did not pledge to limit the expansion of slavery in new territories, the compromise failed to satisfy most Republicans. In not committing to permit and protect slavery in the territories, the compromise failed to address the issue that had divided the Democratic Party into Northern and Southern factions in the 1860 presidential elections. The convention's work was completed with only a few days left in the final session of Congress. The proposal was rejected in the Senate in a 28–7 vote and never came to a vote in the House. The Committee of Thirty-Three finally submitted the Corwin Amendment, a less-encompassing constitutional amendment, which Congress passed. The proposed amendment protected slavery where it currently existed, which Lincoln and most members of both parties already believed was a state right protected by the existing US Constitution. A bill for New Mexico statehood was tabled by a vote of 115–71, with opposition from Southern Democrats and Republicans.

With the adjournment of Congress and the inauguration of Lincoln as president, the only avenue for compromise involved informal negotiations between Unionist Southerners and representatives of the incoming Republican government, and Congress was no longer a factor. A final convention of only the slave states in the Union scheduled for June 1861 never occurred because of the events at Fort Sumter. Robert H. Hatton, a Unionist from Tennessee who would later change sides, summed up the feelings of many shortly before Congress adjourned:

We are getting along badly with our work of compromise – badly. We will break, I apprehend, without any thing being done. God will hold some men to a fearful responsibility. My heart is sick.

== Sources ==
- Crapol, Edward P. John Tyler: The Accidental President (2006) ISBN 978-0-8078-3041-3.
- Crofts, Daniel W. Reluctant Confederates: Upper South Unionists in the Secession Crisis (1989) ISBN 0-8078-1809-7.
- Klein, Maury. Days of Defiance: Sumter, Secession, and the Coming of the Civil War (1997) ISBN 0-679-44747-4.
- Nevins, Allan. The Emergence of Lincoln: Prologue to Civil War 1859–1861 (1950)
- Potter, David M. The Impending Crisis 1848–1861 (1976) ISBN 0-06-131929-5.
