= Abel Underwood =

American judge and politician

Member of the Vermont House of Representatives from Newbury
- In office 1861–1862
- Preceded by: Henry W. Bailey
- Succeeded by: William R. Shedd

Judge of the Vermont Circuit Court
- In office 1854–1857
- Preceded by: Jacob Collamer
- Succeeded by: None (position eliminated)

United States Attorney for the District of Vermont
- In office 1849–1853
- Preceded by: Charles Linsley
- Succeeded by: Lucius B. Peck

State's Attorney of Orange County, Vermont
- In office 1838–1839
- Preceded by: Edmond Weston
- Succeeded by: Elijah Farr
- In office 1840–1841
- Preceded by: Elijah Farr
- Succeeded by: Elijah Farr

Personal details
- Born: April 8, 1799 Bradford, Vermont
- Died: April 22, 1879 (aged 80) Wells River, Vermont
- Party: Whig (before 1855); Republican (from 1855)
- Spouse: Emily Rix
- Relations: Levi Underwood (nephew)
- Children: 5
- Profession: Attorney

Abel Underwood (April 8, 1799 – April 22, 1879) was a Vermont lawyer, judge, and politician. A Whig and later a Republican, he was most notable for his service as United States Attorney for the District of Vermont (1849-1853) and a judge of the Vermont Circuit Court (1854-1857).

A native of Bradford, Vermont, Underwood attended the academy in Royalton, Vermont to prepare for a university education, and graduated from Dartmouth College in 1824. He read law with Isaac Fletcher, attained admission to the bar in 1827, and practiced in Wells River, Vermont. A Whig, he served as State's Attorney of Orange County (1838-1839, 1840-1841), U.S. Attorney during the presidencies of Zachary Taylor and Millard Fillmore (1849-1853), and a judge of the Vermont Circuit Court from 1854 until the court was abolished in 1857. He became a Republican when the party was founded in the 1850s, and served in the Vermont House of Representatives from 1861 to 1862. Underwood died in Wells River in 1879.

== Biography ==
Abel Underwood was born in Bradford, Vermont on April 8, 1799, the son of John Underwood and Mary (Fassett) Underwood. Having decided early on a legal career, Underwood attended the academy in Royalton to prepare for a university education, and taught school to help pay his expenses. Underwood then enrolled at Dartmouth College, from which he graduated in 1824.

After receiving his degree, Underwood studied law with Isaac Fletcher in Danville, and attained admission to the bar in 1827. Underwood practiced in partnership with Fletcher for a year, then moved to Wells River to establish his own office. Initially unsuccessful, Underwood relocated to Dexter, Maine, but returned to Wells River a year later. His practice became successful after his return to Wells River, and Underwood became one of Vermont's most prominent corporation attorneys, with his specialty being railroad rights of way and construction. Underwood was also involved in business and finance, and was president of the Bank of Newbury.

Active in politics as a Whig, Underwood served as State's Attorney of Orange County from 1838 to 1839, and again from 1840 to 1841. In 1843, he was an unsuccessful candidate for the Vermont Senate. In 1849 he was appointed United States Attorney for the District of Vermont, and he served until 1853. In 1854 he was appointed a judge of the Vermont Circuit Court, succeeding Jacob Collamer following Collamer's election to the United States Senate. He served on the bench until 1857, when Vermont abolished its circuit courts and Underwood's position was eliminated. By now a Republican, from 1861 to 1862, Underwood served as Newbury's member of the Vermont House of Representatives. In 1867, Underwood was appointed federal Register in Bankruptcy for Vermont's 2nd congressional district, and he served until his death.

== Death ==
Underwood died in Wells River on April 22, 1879.

== Family ==
In 1827, Underwood married Emily Rix of Royalton. Their children included Elizabeth, George, Emily, Mary Ellen, and Susan.

Abel Underwood was the uncle of Levi Underwood, the son of Abel Underwood's brother Silas.

== Sources ==
=== Books ===
- Child, Hamilton (1888). Gazetteer of Orange County, Vt., 1762-1888. Vol. Part 1. Syracuse, NY: Syracuse Journal Company.
- Underwood, Lucien Marcus (1913). The Underwood Families of America. Vol. 1. Lancaster, PA: New Era Printing Company.

=== Newspapers ===
- "Election of Senators -- Official". Vermont Watchman and State Journal. 22 September 1843 – via Newspapers.com.
- "Death of Judge Underwood". Argus and Patriot. 30 April 1879.
