= 1857 Vermont gubernatorial election =

- September 1, 1857
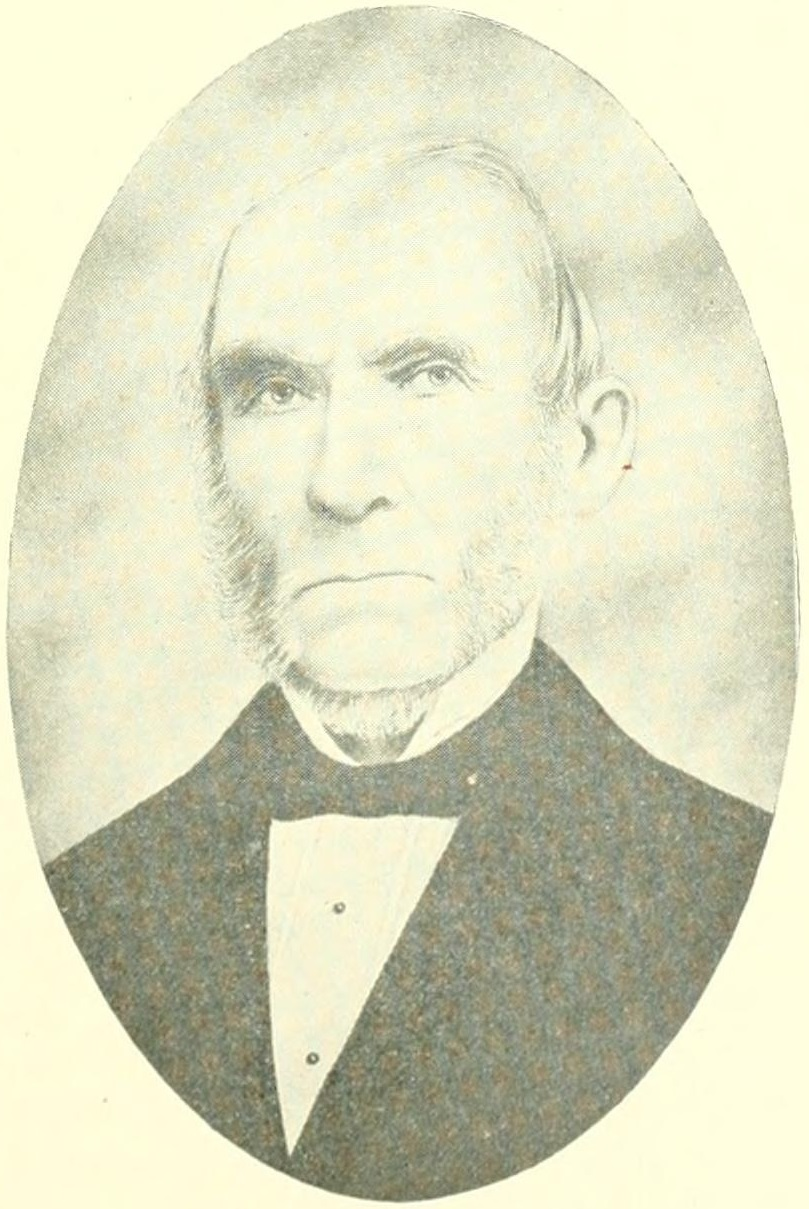
Nominee	Ryland Fletcher	Henry Keyes
Party	Republican	Democratic
Popular vote	26,719	12,869
Percentage	67.05%	32.29%
- County results Fletcher: 50–60% 60–70% 70–80%
Governor before election
Ryland Fletcher
Republican
Elected Governor
Ryland Fletcher
Republican

The 1857 Vermont gubernatorial election for governor of Vermont was held on Tuesday, September 1. In keeping with the "Mountain Rule", incumbent Republican Ryland Fletcher was a candidate for a second one-year term. The Democratic nominee was Henry Keyes, a former member of the Vermont House of Representatives and Vermont Senate who had run against Fletcher in 1856.

Vermont continued to strongly support abolitionism and the Republican Party, and Fletcher was easily re-elected. Fletcher took the oath of office for a one-year term that began on October 9.

== General election ==
=== Results ===
1857 Vermont gubernatorial election
Party	Candidate	Votes	%	±%
Republican	Ryland Fletcher (incumbent)	26,719	67.05	
Democratic	Henry Keyes	12,869	32.29	
	Scattering	262	0.66	
Total votes		39,850	100.0	
