= John Godfrey Saxe II =

American politician

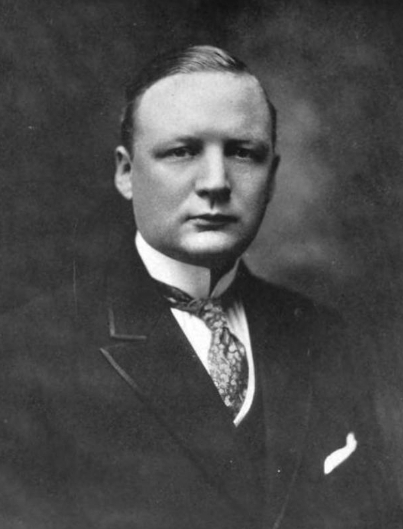
- Born: John Godfrey Saxe II; 25 June 1877; Saratoga, New York
- Died: 17 April 1953 (aged 75); Manhattan, New York
- Resting place: Albany Rural Cemetery, Colonie, New York
- Education: McGill University; Columbia Law School
- Occupations: Lawyer; New York State Senator
- Spouse: Mary Sands
- Parent(s): John Theodore Saxe & Mary Bosworth
- Relatives: John Godfrey Saxe, grandfather

John Godfrey Saxe II (June 25, 1877 – April 17, 1953) of Manhattan was a lawyer and a member of the New York State Senate. He was a delegate to the New York State Constitutional Convention representing New York's 16th congressional district in 1915. He was president of the New York State Bar Association, and counsel for Columbia University.

== Biography ==
He was born on June 25, 1877, in Saratoga, New York, to John Theodore Saxe and Mary Bosworth. He was the grandson of John Godfrey Saxe. He married Mary Sands on June 10, 1909. He died on April 17, 1953.

In the November 8, 1910 New York State Senate election, in the 17th State Senate district that was Republican by a great majority, John Saxe defeated incumbent Senator George B. Agnew who had been the sponsor of the Hart–Agnew Law that would lead to the complete shutdown of Thoroughbred racing in New York State.

New York State Senate
Preceded by George B. Agnew	New York State Senate; 17th District; 1907–1910	Succeeded by Walter R. Herrick
