= The Daily Cleveland Herald =

- Type: Daily newspaper (except Sun.)
- Publisher: Harris and Fairbanks
- Founded: 1853
- Ceased publication: 1874
- City: Cleveland, Ohio
- Country: United States
- OCLC number: 9647644

The Daily Cleveland Herald was a daily American newspaper published by Harris and Fairbanks from 1853 to 1874 in Cleveland, Cuyahoga County, Ohio. It covered events in the city of Cleveland, Cuyahoga County and the state of Ohio.

== History ==
It was preceded by the Cleveland Daily Herald (1839–1843, published by J.A. Harris) and then The Cleveland Herald (1843–1853, published weekly by J.A. Harris), and succeeded by the Cleveland Daily Herald (1874–1880, published by Fairbanks, Benedict & Co.).

It is noted as the first to publish a remark relating the process of law making to sausages. The March 29, 1869 edition of the paper quoted poet John Godfrey Saxe as stating: "Laws, like sausages, cease to inspire respect in proportion as we know how they are made."
