= 1859 Vermont gubernatorial election =

- September 6, 1859
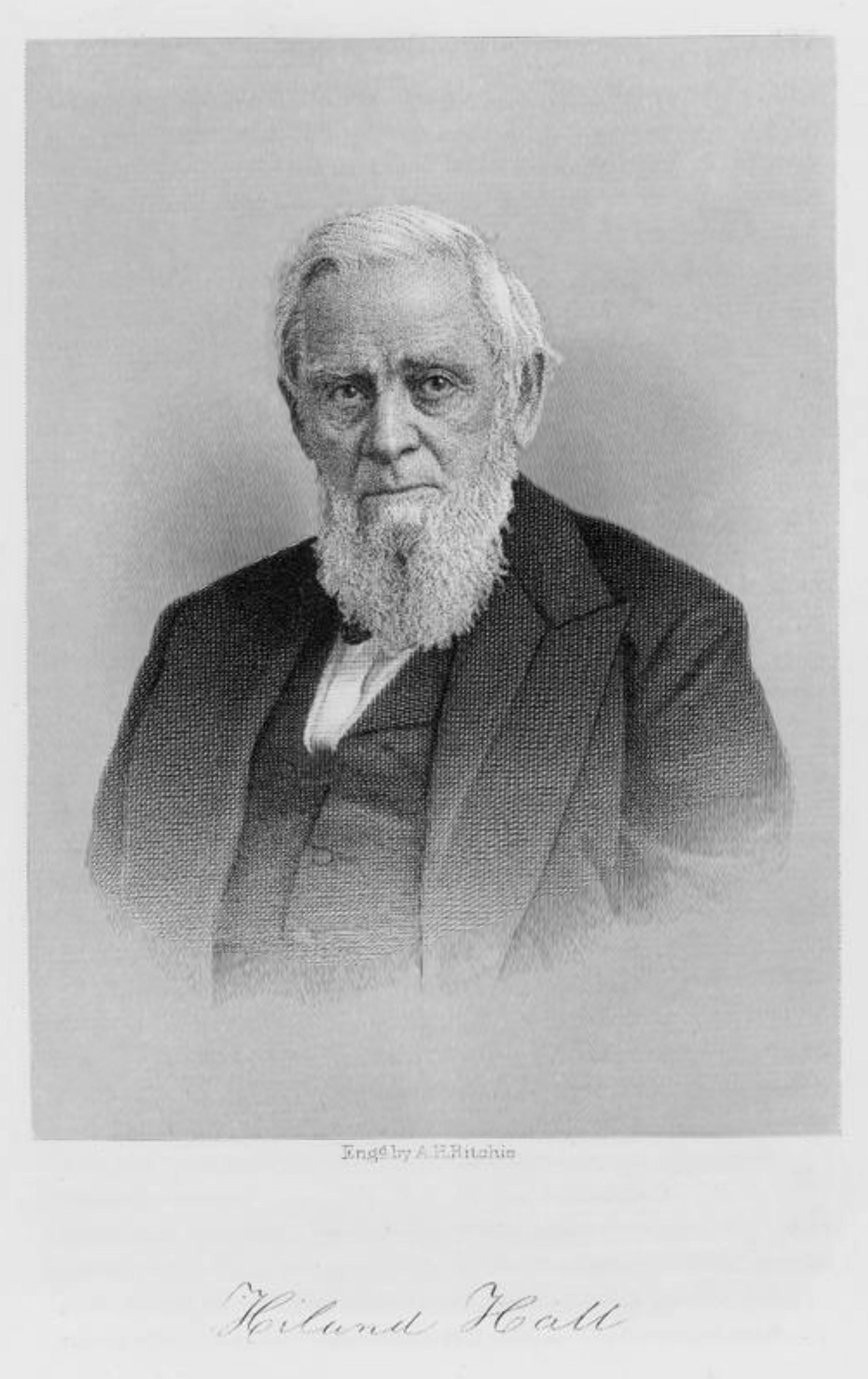

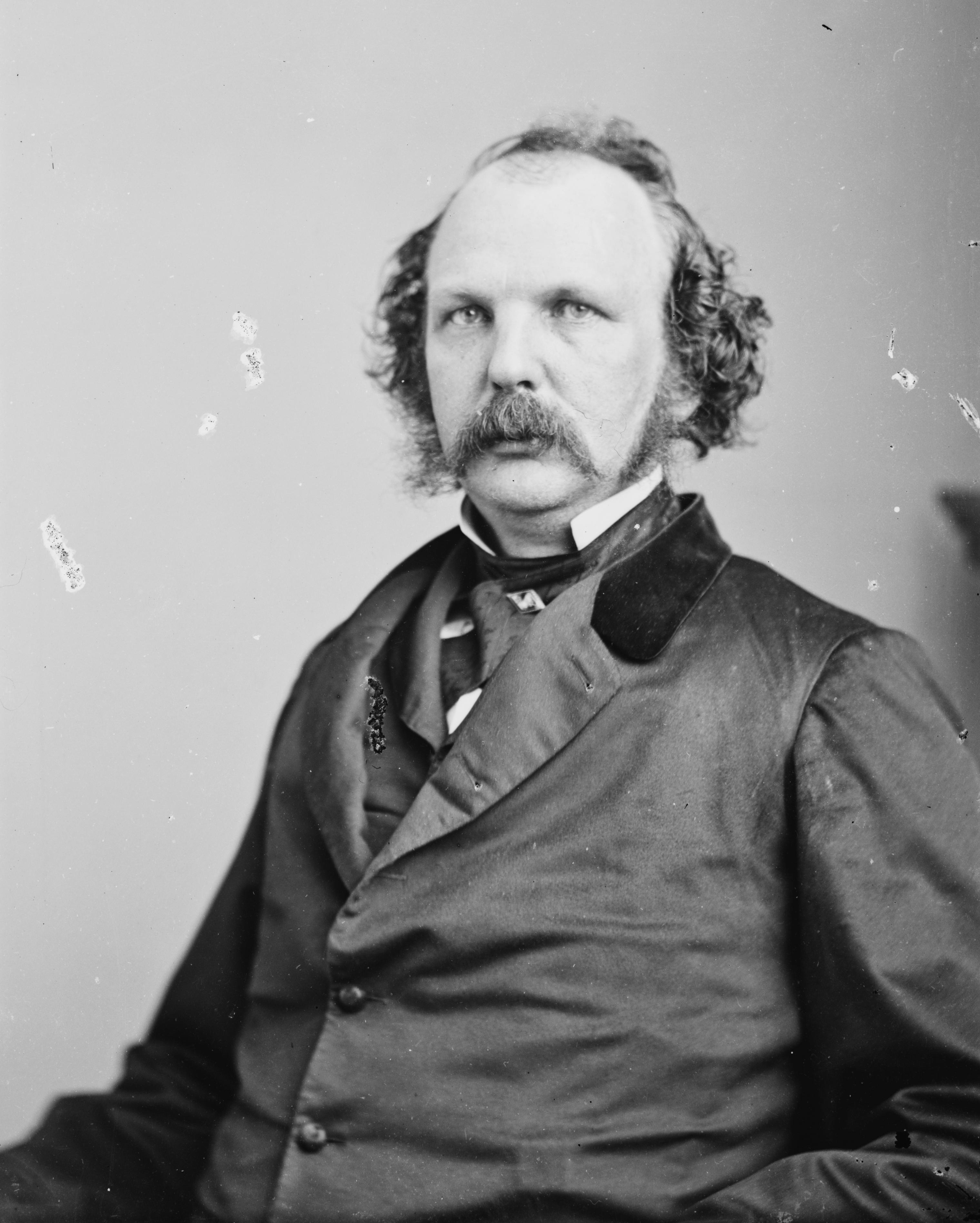
Nominee	Hiland Hall	John Godfrey Saxe
Party	Republican	Democratic
Popular vote	31,045	14,328
Percentage	68.39%	31.57%
- County results Hall: 50–60% 60–70% 70–80% 80–90%
Governor before election
Hiland Hall
Republican
Elected Governor
Hiland Hall
Republican

The 1859 Vermont gubernatorial election was held on Tuesday, September 6. In keeping with the "Mountain Rule", incumbent Republican Hiland Hall was a candidate for a second one-year term as governor. The Democratic nominee was John Godfrey Saxe, former State's Attorney of Chittenden County.

Vermont's support for the Republican Party and the abolition of slavery remained strong, and Hall was easily re-elected. Hall took the oath of office for a one-year term that began on October 14.

== General election ==
=== Results ===
1859 Vermont gubernatorial election
Party	Candidate	Votes	%	±%
Republican	Hiland Hall (incumbent)	31,045	68.39	
Democratic	John Godfrey Saxe	14,328	31.57	
	Scattering	17	0.04	
Total votes		45,390	100.0	
