= Merritt Clark =

American politician (1803–1898)

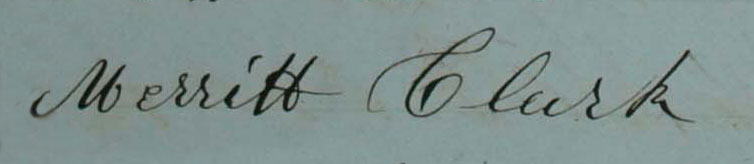
Signature of Merritt Clark, 02/1855

Merritt Clark (February 11, 1803 – May 5, 1898) was an American businessperson and politician from Vermont.

Clark was born in Middletown, Vermont. He graduated from Middlebury College in 1823. Clark served as postmaster in Middletown and Poultney, Vermont and was involved in the mercantile business. A member of the Democratic Party, he was elected to the Vermont House of Representatives in 1832–33, 1839, and 1865–66, and to the Vermont Senate in 1863-64 and 1868–69, as well as the 1870 Vermont Constitutional Convention. He was the first president of the Rutland and Washington Railroad.

In 1870, he was a member of the Vermont Board of Education, which published a report critical of the state's normal schools (teacher training institutions).

Party political offices
Preceded by John S. Robinson	Democratic nominee for Governor of Vermont; 1854, 1855	Succeeded by Henry Keyes
