= Paul Dame =

American politician

Chair of the Vermont Republican Party
- Incumbent
- Assumed office November 6, 2021
- Preceded by: Deb Billado

Member of the Vermont House of Representatives from the Chittenden 8-2 District
- In office January 7, 2015 – January 2017

Personal details
- Party: Republican
- Education: Rochester Institute of Technology (attended); University of Vermont (BS)

Paul Dame is an American politician serving as the chair of the Vermont Republican Party.

== Early life and education ==
Dame grew up in Brandon, Vermont. He graduated from Otter Valley Union High School and got a bachelor's from the University of Vermont.

== Career ==
Dame served as a member of the Vermont House from 2015 to 2017. He ran for election in the 2022 Vermont House of Representatives election, but lost by 5 votes in the Republican primary. He was elected Chair of the Vermont Republican party in 2021 against far-right politician Jim Sexton. He runs a retirement planning company called Shepherd Financial.

== Political positions ==
Dame describes himself as a Libertarian.

As chair of the VT Republican Party Dame was the decisive vote (via abstention), that overturned the prior party policy of not supporting convicted felons that would have applied to Donald Trump.

Party political offices
Preceded by Deb Billado	Chair of the Vermont Republican Party; 2021–present	Incumbent
