= Rutland and Washington Railroad =

Railroad in New York state and Vermont

Map

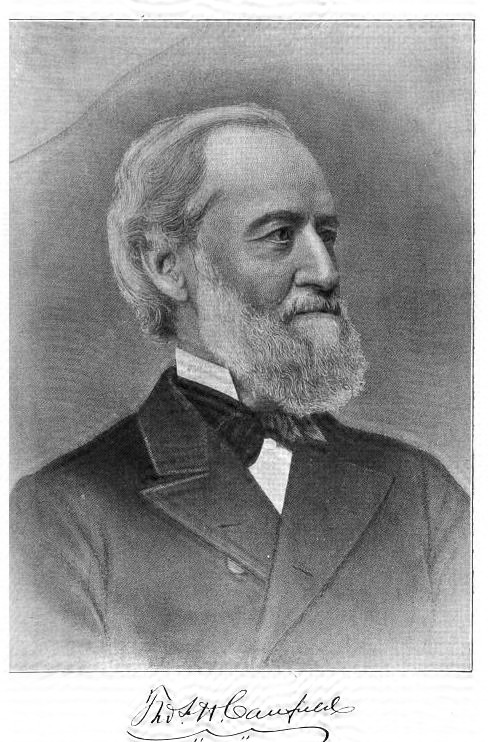
Thomas Canfield

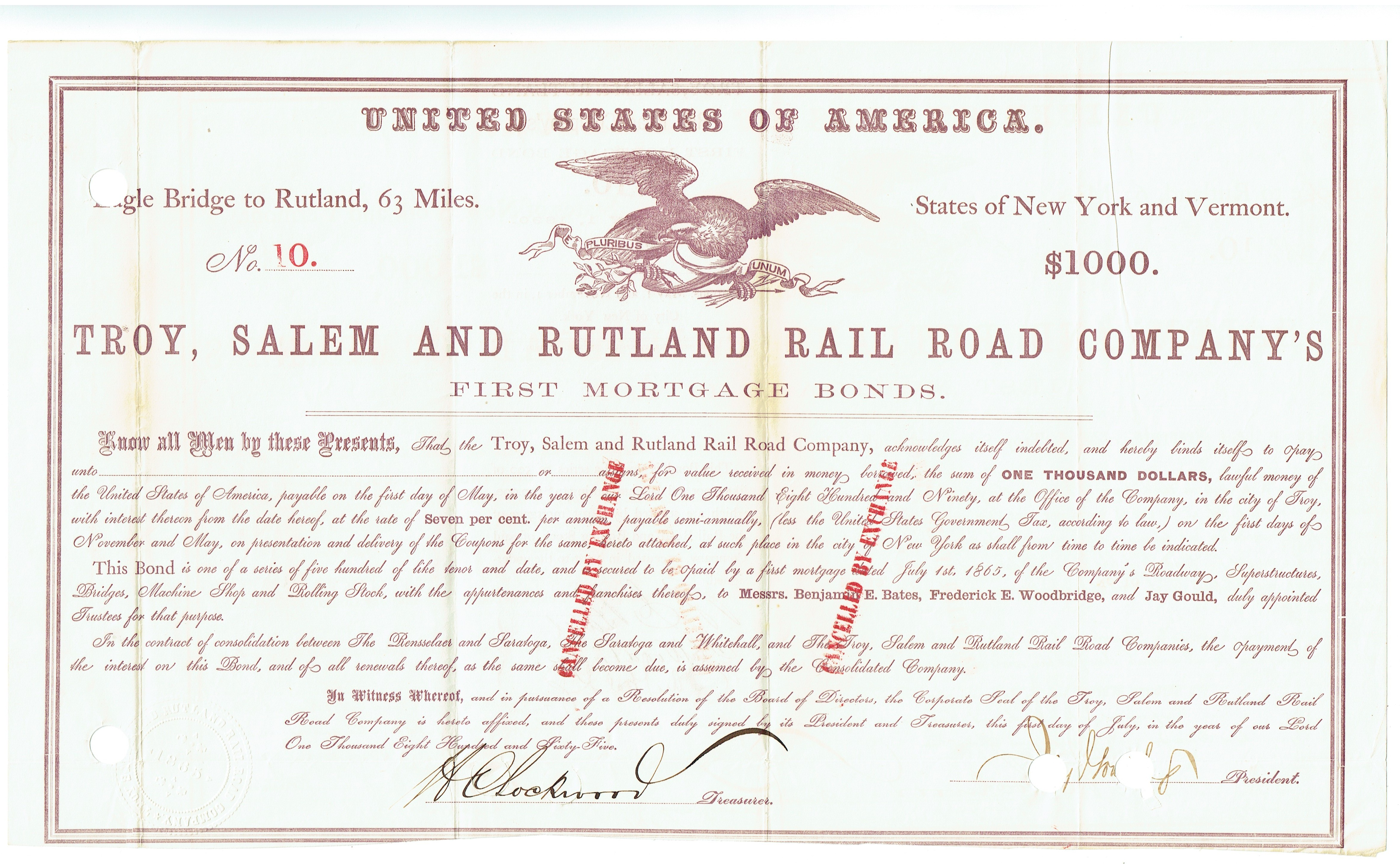
First Mortgage Bond of the Troy, Salem and Rutland Rail Road Company, issued 1 July 1865, signed by Jay Gould

The Rutland and Washington Railroad was a railroad company based in Rutland, Vermont, United States. It was chartered in Vermont on November 13, 1847, and built between Rutland and Eagle Bridge in Rensselaer County, New York from 1851 to 1852. One of the company's founders was Merritt Clark, a Vermont politician, and another was Thomas Canfield, later involved with the Northern Pacific Railway. In order to build in New York, the company, on June 24, 1850, took a perpetual rent-free lease of the franchise rights east of Salem of the Troy and Rutland Railroad, which had been chartered in that state on July 2, 1849. The remainder of the Troy and Rutland, from Salem west to Eagle Bridge, was completed in 1852 and leased to the Rutland and Washington effective July 2.

After the Panic of 1857, a majority of the company's bonds were acquired by Jay Gould at 10 cents on the dollar, which left him in control of the company. Gould is identified as the company's superintendent in a July 1863 newspaper article.

The company's property (Salem to Rutland) was sold at foreclosure in 1865, the portions in New York and Vermont being sold on March 15 and May 23, respectively, to holders of the Rutland and Washington's securities. The property of the Troy and Rutland (Eagle Bridge to Salem) was sold on July 11, 1863, to Jay Gould. The property in New York was conveyed to the Troy, Salem and Rutland Rail Road Company (incorporated June 3, 1865) on June 3 (Eagle Bridge to Salem) and June 30 (Salem to state line). On February 1, 1867, the Salem and Rutland Railroad was incorporated and received the portion in Vermont. The Troy, Salem and Rutland leased the Salem and Rutland on March 19, and subsequently acquired its entire stock, allowing the latter to release the former from all obligations on October 10, 1867. However, the Troy, Salem and Rutland was never an operating company, immediately leasing its road to the Rensselaer and Saratoga Railroad upon acquisition until it was merged into that company on October 20, 1868. The Delaware and Hudson Company leased the Rensselaer and Saratoga, including the Eagle Bridge-Rutland line, on February 24, 1870.
