= John Theodore Saxe =

John Theodore Saxe (April 22, 1843 - June 30, 1881) was the senior member of the Saxe Brothers firm, and a professor at the Albany Academy.

== Biography ==
He was born on April 22, 1843, in St. Albans, Vermont, to John Godfrey Saxe and Sophia Newell Sollace. He graduated from the University of Vermont in 1862, A.B., 1865, A.M. He was the senior member of the lumber merchant firm, Saxe Brothers. He was a professor in the Albany Academy, 1862-1863. He married Mary Bosworth in New York City, on January 18, 1876. She died at Albany, April 27, 1881. Her parents were Chief Justice Joseph Sollace Bosworth, of the superior court of New York, and Frances Pumpelly. They had one son, John Godfrey Saxe II. He died at Albany, New York, on June 30, 1881.
