= Stephen Royce =

American lawyer, judge and politician (1787–1868)

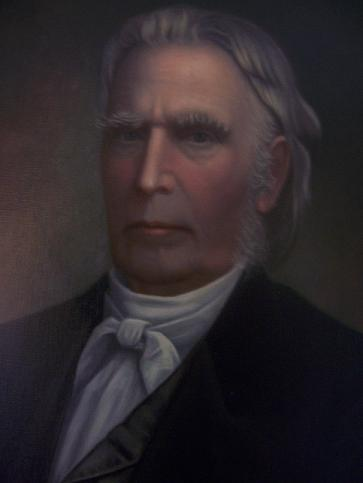
- Portrait on display in Vermont State House

23rd Governor of Vermont
- In office October 12, 1854 – October 10, 1856
- Lieutenant: Ryland Fletcher
- Preceded by: John S. Robinson
- Succeeded by: Ryland Fletcher

Chief of Justice of the Vermont Supreme Court
- In office 1846–1852
- Preceded by: Charles K. Williams
- Succeeded by: Isaac F. Redfield

Associate Justice of the Vermont Supreme Court
- In office 1829–1846
- Preceded by: Bates Turner
- Succeeded by: Charles Davis
- In office 1825–1826
- Preceded by: Asa Aikens
- Succeeded by: Bates Turner

Member of the Vermont House of Representatives from St. Albans
- In office 1822–1825
- Preceded by: James Mason
- Succeeded by: Benjamin Swift

State's Attorney of Franklin County, Vermont
- In office 1816–1817
- Preceded by: Ebenezer Marvin Jr.
- Succeeded by: Israel P. Richardson

Member of the Vermont House of Representatives from Sheldon
- In office 1815–1817
- Preceded by: Chauncey Fitch
- Succeeded by: Samuel Wead

Personal details
- Born: August 12, 1787 Tinmouth, Republic of Vermont
- Died: November 11, 1868 (aged 81) Berkshire, Vermont, U.S.
- Resting place: East Berkshire Episcopal Cemetery, Berkshire, Vermont, U.S.
- Party: Democratic-Republican (before 1833); Whig (before 1854); Republican (from 1854)
- Relations: Homer E. Royce (nephew)
- Education: Middlebury College
- Profession: Attorney

Stephen Royce (August 12, 1787 – November 11, 1868) was an American lawyer, judge and politician. Originally a Democratic-Republican, and later a Whig, he became a Republican when the party was formed in the mid-1850s. Royce served as an associate justice of the Vermont Supreme Court from 1829 to 1846, chief justice from 1846 to 1852, and 23rd governor of Vermont from 1854 to 1856.

Born and raised in Tinmouth, Vermont, Royce attended the local schools and the Addison County Grammar School. He taught school while attending Middlebury College, from which he graduated in 1807. He then studied law, attained admission to the bar 1809, and practiced in East Berkshire, Sheldon, and St. Albans. He represented Sheldon in the Vermont House of Representatives from 1815 to 1817 and served as State's Attorney of Franklin County from 1816 to 1817. Royce represented St. Albans in the Vermont House from 1822 to 1825, when he was selected to serve as an associate justice of the Vermont Supreme Court. He served until 1826, and returned to the court as an associate justice in 1829. He served until 1846, when he became the court's chief justice.

In 1854, Royce was the successful Whig nominee for governor, elected with support from Whigs and members of the new Republican Party. In 1855, he was reelected as a Republican. Royce was Vermont's first Republican governor, and the party remained in control of Vermont's government for the next 100 years. His term included the Republican Party's creation of the Mountain Rule, under which governors alternated between the east and west sides of the Green Mountains and were limited to two years in office.

Royce died in Berkshire on November 11, 1868. He was buried at East Berkshire Episcopal Cemetery in Berkshire.

== Early life ==
Royce was born in Tinmouth in the Republic of Vermont on August 12, 1787, the son of Stephen Royce (1764-1833), a veteran of the American Revolution and War of 1812, and Minerva (Marvin) Royce, a daughter of Ebenezer Marvin, who served as a judge and member of Vermont's Council of Censors. Royce grew up in Franklin and Berkshire and attended the local schools. He attended school in Tinmouth and graduated from the Addison County Grammar School. He began attendance at Middlebury College in 1804, where his classmates included Daniel Azro Ashley Buck and William Slade. He taught school in Sheldon to earn his tuition, and he graduated from Middlebury in 1807.

== Start of career ==
After graduation, Royce began studying law in the office of his uncle, Ebenezer Marvin Jr. He attained admission to the bar in 1809, and practiced in East Berkshire and Sheldon before moving to St. Albans. Among the prospective attorneys who studied law under Royce was Charles Linsley.

Royce was Franklin County State's Attorney from 1816 to 1818, and served in the Vermont House of Representatives from 1815 to 1816 and 1822 to 1824.

== Career as judge ==
Royce was a justice of the Vermont Supreme Court from 1825 to 1827, and again from 1829 to 1846. In 1837, he received the honorary degree of LL.D. from the University of Vermont. In 1846 he became Vermont's Chief Justice and served until 1852.

== Governor ==
He was elected Governor of Vermont in 1854, as a Whig, the last Whig to hold the office. He was re-elected to a second one-year term as a Republican, serving from 1854 to 1856. He was the first Republican to attain the office after the party was founded in the mid-1850s, ushering in more than a century of Republican domination in Vermont politics. Vermont elected only Republicans to the governorship until Democrat Philip Hoff won the office in 1962.

== Death ==
Royce died in Berkshire on November 11, 1868. He was interred at East Berkshire Episcopal Cemetery in East Berkshire.

== Family life ==
He never married, but resided with his mother, at her request, whenever he was in his hometown.

Royce was the uncle of Vermont Chief Justice and Congressman Homer E. Royce.

Party political offices
Preceded by Erastus Fairbanks	Whig nominee for Governor of Vermont; 1854	Succeeded by None
First	Republican nominee for Governor of Vermont; 1855	Succeeded by Ryland Fletcher
Political offices
Preceded by John S. Robinson	Governor of Vermont; 1854–1855	Succeeded by Ryland Fletcher
