= 1855 Vermont gubernatorial election =

- September 4, 1855
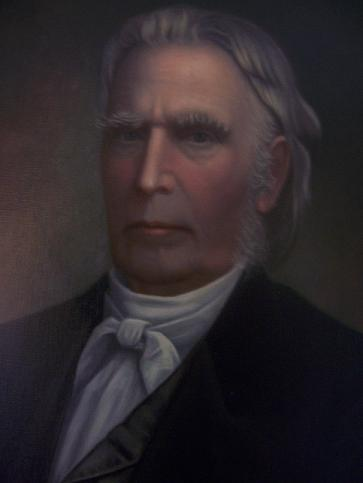
| Nominee | Stephen Royce | Merritt Clark | James M. Slade |
| Party | Republican | Democratic | Know Nothing |
| Popular vote | 25,654 | 12,537 | 3,475 |
| Percentage | 59.49% | 29.07% | 8.06% |
- County results Royce: 30–40% 40–50% 50–60% 60–70% 70–80% 80–90%
Governor before election
Stephen Royce
Whig
Elected Governor
Stephen Royce
Republican

The 1855 Vermont gubernatorial election for governor of Vermont was held on September 4. With the Whig Party defunct after 1854, incumbent Stephen Royce, who had run with the support of both Whigs and the new Republican Party in 1854, ran as the nominee of the Republicans. The Democratic candidate was Merritt Clark, who had run unsuccessfully against Royce in 1854. James M. Slade, the Clerk of the Vermont House of Representatives was the nominee of the Know Nothing Party, also called the American Party.

With Vermont firmly in the anti-slavery camp and the Republican Party established as the main abolitionist party, Royce was easily re-elected with 58.4 percent of the vote to 22.9 for Clark and 8.4 for Slade. Royce took the oath of office and began a one-year term on October 13, 1855.

The 1855 election also marked Republican extension of the "Mountain Rule" for the governor's and lieutenant governor's offices. As originally implemented, the Mountain Rule called for one U.S. Senator to be from the west side of the Green Mountains, and one from the east, and for the governorship and lieutenant governorship to rotate between east and west. With the Republican Party's expansion of the rule, it dictated that the governor and lieutenant governor would not only be from alternate sides of the Green Mountains, but that they would also be limited to two years in office.

== General election ==
=== Results ===
1855 Vermont gubernatorial election
| Party | Candidate | Votes | % | ±% |
|---|---|---|---|---|
| Republican | Stephen Royce (incumbent) | 25,654 | 59.49 | |
| Democratic | Merritt Clark | 12,537 | 29.07 | |
| Know Nothing | James M. Slade | 3,475 | 8.06 | |
| | William R. Shafter | 1,308 | 3.03 | |
| | John H. Wheeler | 49 | 0.12 | |
| | William Slade | 18 | 0.04 | |
| | Lawrence Brainerd | 3 | 0.01 | |
| | Write-in | 79 | 0.18 | |
| Total votes | | 43,123 | 100.0 | |
