= Vermont Republican Party =

Vermont affiliate of the Republican Party

- Chairperson: Paul Dame
- Governor: Phil Scott
- Lieutenant Governor: John Rodgers
- Senate Minority Leader: Scott Beck
- House Minority Leader: Patricia McCoy
- Founded: July 13, 1854; 172 years ago
- Headquarters: Montpelier, Vermont
- Ideology: Conservatism
- National affiliation: Republican Party
- Colors: Red
- United States Senate: 0 / 2
- United States House of Representatives: 0 / 1
- Statewide Offices: 2 / 6
- Vermont Senate: 13 / 30
- Vermont House of Representatives: 56 / 150
- Elected County Judges: 7 / 42
- Countywide Offices: 5 / 42
- Mayorships: 1 / 8
- Burlington City Council: 0 / 12

Election symbol

Website
- www.vtgop.org

The Vermont Republican Party is the affiliate of the Republican Party in Vermont and has been active since its foundation in the 1860s. The party is the second largest in the state behind the Vermont Democratic Party, but ahead of the Vermont Progressive Party. The party historically dominated Vermont politics until the mid-20th century, but was replaced by the Vermont Democratic Party. The party currently has very weak federal electoral power in the state, controlling none of Vermont's federal elected offices. The two statewide offices that the party currently controls are the governorship, held by Phil Scott, and the lieutenant governorship, held by John S. Rodgers.

The Vermont Republican Party tends to hold more moderate views than other Republican Party state affiliates. This is because Vermont is widely regarded as one of the most liberal and progressive states in the nation. Vermont Republicans also tend to be more anti-Trumpist than Republicans in other states. Current Republican Governor Phil Scott voted for Democratic nominee Kamala Harris in the 2024 presidential election and Joe Biden in the 2020 presidential election calling both "a vote against Donald Trump" and a move to "put country over party" and acknowledged Biden's victory, repudiating false claims of election interference.

In the 2024 primaries, the Vermont primary was one of only two races that Donald Trump did not carry (the other being the District of Columbia primary).

== History ==
Newspaper editor Eliakim Persons Walton condemned the 1854 Whig Convention for not being against slavery strongly. The first convention of the Vermont Republican Party was held on July 13, 1854, in Montpelier, Vermont. The party was organized, nominated candidates for office, selected delegates to the Republican National Convention, and approved a platform. The convention was meant to be held on July 4, but was delayed to July 13 as to be on the anniversary of the Northwest Ordinance. Had the convention been held on July 4, it would have been the first Republican convention held instead of the one conducted by the Michigan Republican Party. Lawrence Brainerd was selected to serve as president of the convention.

Walton was initially selected to serve as the party's gubernatorial nominee in the 1854 election, but he withdrew and the party selected to give its nomination to Stephen Royce, who was a member of the Whig Party and had already been nominated to serve as their gubernatorial candidate. Royce accepted the party's nomination and won the 1854 gubernatorial election. The Whig Party of Vermont disbanded and merged with the Republicans in 1854, and Joyce won reelected in the 1855 gubernatorial election with the Republican nomination.

The party won every statewide election from 1854 to 1958, won every presidential election from 1856 to 1960, and held the governorship from 1854 to 1963.

William H. Meyer won election to the United States House of Representatives from Vermont's at-large congressional district in 1958, becoming the first Democrat to win statewide since 1853. Senator Barry Goldwater, the Republican presidential nominee for the 1964 presidential election, became the first Republican to not win Vermont in a presidential election as he lost the state to incumbent Democratic President Lyndon B. Johnson. Philip H. Hoff's victory in the 1962 gubernatorial election made him the first member of the Democratic Party to hold Vermont's governorship since the 1853 gubernatorial election.

Vermont only elected Republicans to the United States Senate for 118 years. Patrick Leahy's victory in the 1974 Senate election made him the first member of the Democratic Party elected to the United States Senate from Vermont. Senator Jim Jeffords left the Republican Party on May 24, 2001, to become an independent and caucus with the Democratic Party which gave them the majority in the United States Senate.

The party controlled all of the seats in the Vermont Senate after the 1924 election. The Democrats gained control of the state senate for the first time after the 1986 election. The party received its lowest amount of seats in the state senate since its foundation in the 2018 election.

In the 2024 elections, the party won the lieutenant gubernatorial election with John S. Rodgers, and also made significant gains in the state Senate as well as the House, breaking Democratic supermajorities in both chambers. They won 13 of 30 Senate districts - their best total since the 2000s - with Democrats and Progressives combining for the other 17.

== Current elected officials ==
The Vermont Republican Party controls two of the six statewide offices.

=== Members of Congress ===
- None

=== Statewide offices ===
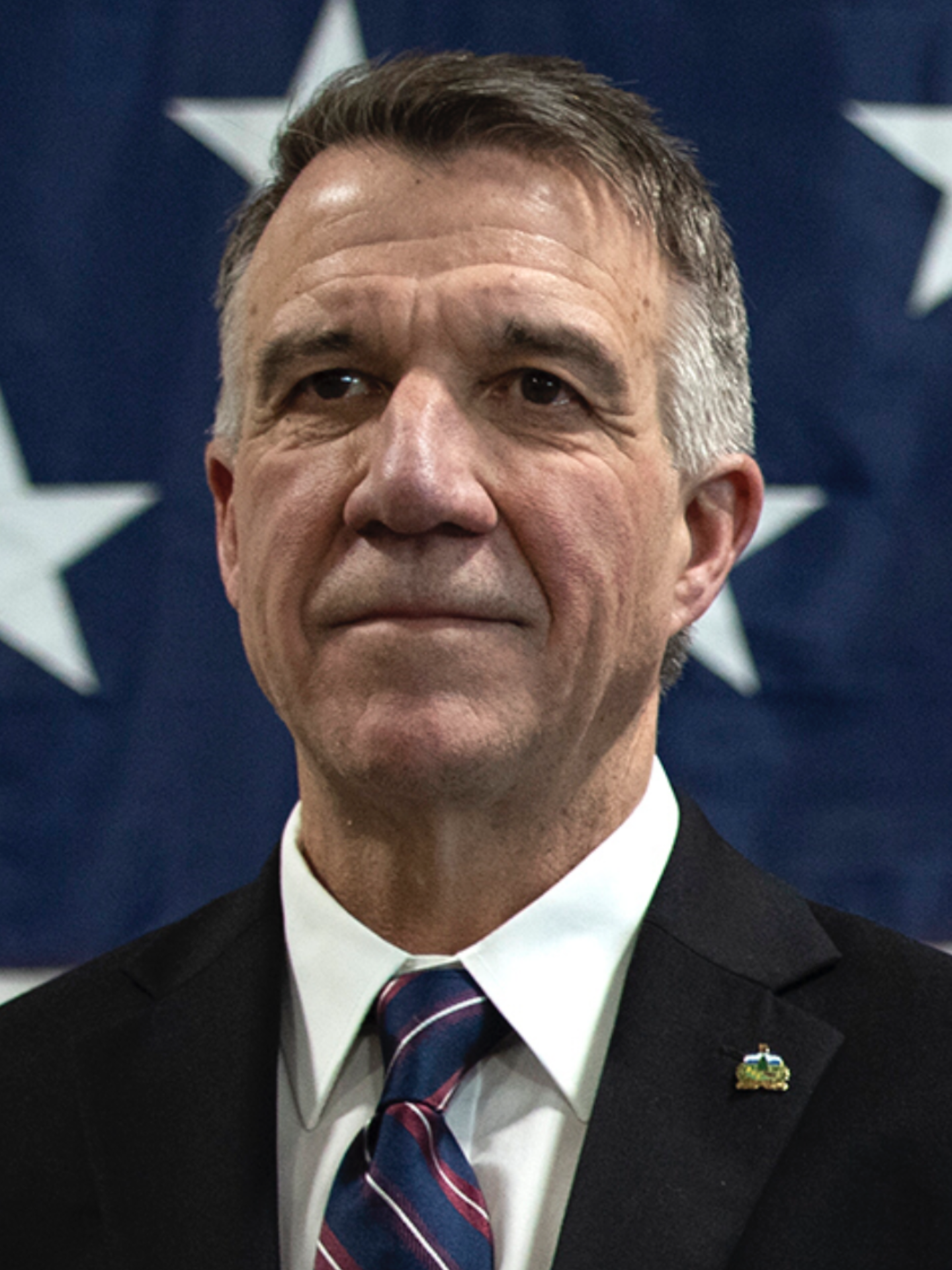
Governor Phil Scott

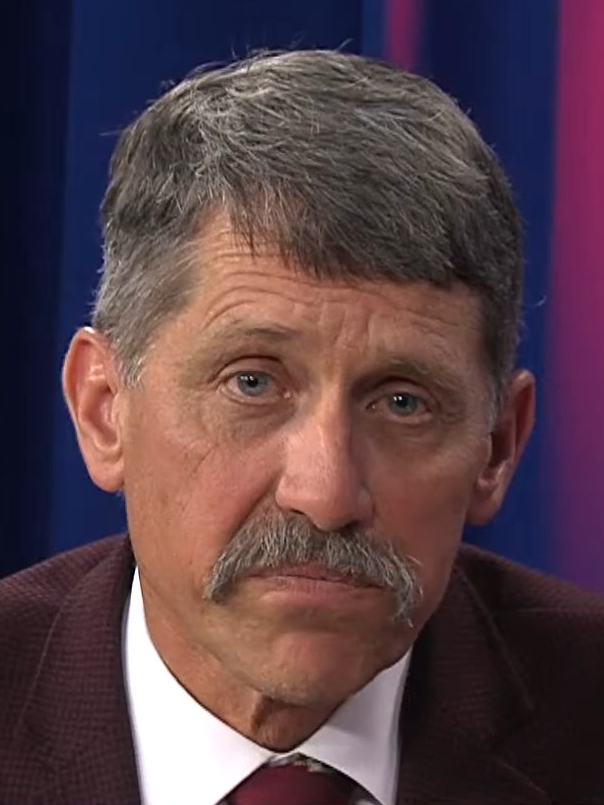
Lieutenant Governor John S. Rodgers

=== Legislative ===
- Vermont Senate
  - Minority Leader: Scott Beck
- Vermont House of Representatives
  - Minority Leader: Patricia McCoy

== Electoral performance ==
=== State legislature ===
House
Election year	No. of overall seats won	+/–	Governor	Reference
1876	205 / 241	Steady	Asahel Peck	
1878	175 / 241	▼30	Horace Fairbanks	
1880	217 / 241	▲42	Redfield Proctor	
1882	183 / 241	▼34	Redfield Proctor	
1884	195 / 241	▲12	John L. Barstow	
1886	206 / 241	▲11	Samuel E. Pingree	
1888	219 / 241	▲13	Ebenezer J. Ormsbee	
1890	172 / 241	▼47	William P. Dillingham	
1892	200 / 241	▲28	Carroll S. Page	
1894	228 / 241	▲28	Levi K. Fuller	
1896	224 / 241	▼4	Urban A. Woodbury	
1898	203 / 241	▼21	Josiah Grout	
1900	196 / 241	▼7	Edward Curtis Smith	
1902	192 / 241	▼4	William W. Stickney	
1904	206 / 241	▲14	John G. McCullough	
1906	199 / 241	▼7	Charles J. Bell	
1908	201 / 241	▲2	Fletcher D. Proctor	
1910	194 / 241	▼7	George H. Prouty	
1912	146 / 241	▼48	John A. Mead	
1914	174 / 241	▲28	Allen M. Fletcher	
1916	195 / 241	▲21	Charles W. Gates	
1918	211 / 241	▲16	Horace F. Graham	
1920	215 / 241	▲4	Percival W. Clement	

Senate
Election year	No. of overall seats won	+/–	Governor	Reference
1876	30 / 30	Steady	Asahel Peck	
1878	29 / 30	▼1	Horace Fairbanks	
1880	30 / 30	▲1	Redfield Proctor	
1882	28 / 30	▼2	Redfield Proctor	
1884	27 / 30	▲1	John L. Barstow	
1886	29 / 30	▲2	Samuel E. Pingree	
1888	30 / 30	▲1	Ebenezer J. Ormsbee	
1890	29 / 30	▼1	William P. Dillingham	
1892	30 / 30	▲1	Carroll S. Page	
1894	30 / 30	Steady	Levi K. Fuller	
1896	30 / 30	Steady	Urban A. Woodbury	
1898	30 / 30	Steady	Josiah Grout	
1900	30 / 30	Steady	Edward Curtis Smith	
1902	25 / 30	▼5	William W. Stickney	
1904	30 / 30	▲5	John G. McCullough	
1906	30 / 30	Steady	Charles J. Bell	
1908	28 / 30	▼2	Fletcher D. Proctor	
1910	30 / 30	▲2	George H. Prouty	
1912	27 / 30	▼3	John A. Mead	
1914	30 / 30	▲3	Allen M. Fletcher	
1916	30 / 30	Steady	Charles W. Gates	
1918	29 / 30	▼1	Horace F. Graham	
1920	29 / 30	Steady	Percival W. Clement	

== Works cited ==
- Doyle, William (1992). The Vermont Political Tradition: And Those Who Helped Make It. ISBN 0961548614.
- Hand, Samuel; Marshall, Jeffrey; Sanford, D. (1985). ""Little Republics" The Structure of State Politics in Vermont, 1854-1920" (PDF). 53 (3). Vermont Historical Society.
