= 1854 Vermont gubernatorial election =

- September 5, 1854
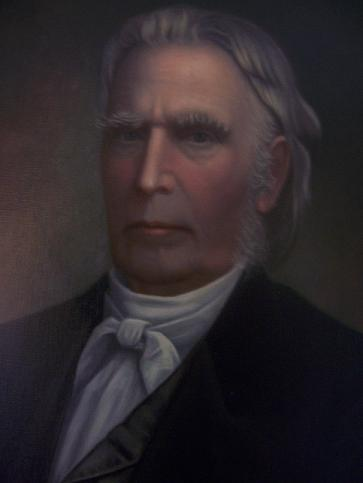
Nominee	Stephen Royce	Merritt Clark
Party	Whig	Democratic
Alliance	Republican
Popular vote	27,926	15,084
Percentage	62.59%	33.81%
- County results Royce: 50–60% 60–70% 70–80% 80–90%
Governor before election
John S. Robinson
Democratic
Elected Governor
Stephen Royce
Whig

The 1854 Vermont gubernatorial election for governor of Vermont took place on September 5. The Whig nominee was Stephen Royce, former Chief Justice of the Vermont Supreme Court. The Democratic nominee was Merritt Clark, and Lawrence Brainerd ran as the nominee of the Free Soil Party even as he was one of the organizers of the new anti-slavery Republican Party and appeared as a Whig candidate for the Vermont Senate on the ballot in Franklin County. Whig William C. Kittredge was nominated for governor against his wishes by advocates of the Temperance movement and Democrat Horatio Needham also attracted the support of some Free Soil advocates.

With the Whig Party splintering nationally over the slavery issue, the Republican Party was formed as the main abolitionist party, and Royce was endorsed by the new organization. In the September voting, Free Soil advocates, Republicans, and anti-slavery Whigs largely backed Royce, who was easily elected with 62.6 percent to 33.9 for Clark and 1.4 for Brainerd. Kittredge, Needham, William R. Shafter, and other write-in candidates all received less than one percent each. Royce took the oath of office and began a one-year term on October 12.

== General election ==
=== Results ===
1854 Vermont gubernatorial election
Party	Candidate	Votes	%	±%
Whig	Stephen Royce	27,926	62.59	
Democratic	Merritt Clark	15,084	33.81	
Free Soil	Lawrence Brainerd	619	1.39	
Free Soil	Horatio Needham	302	0.68	
Whig	William C. Kittredge	293	0.66	
	William R. Shafter	255	0.57	
Write-in	Other	135	0.30	
Total votes		44,614	100.0	
