= Broughton Harris =

American public official and businessman from Vermont

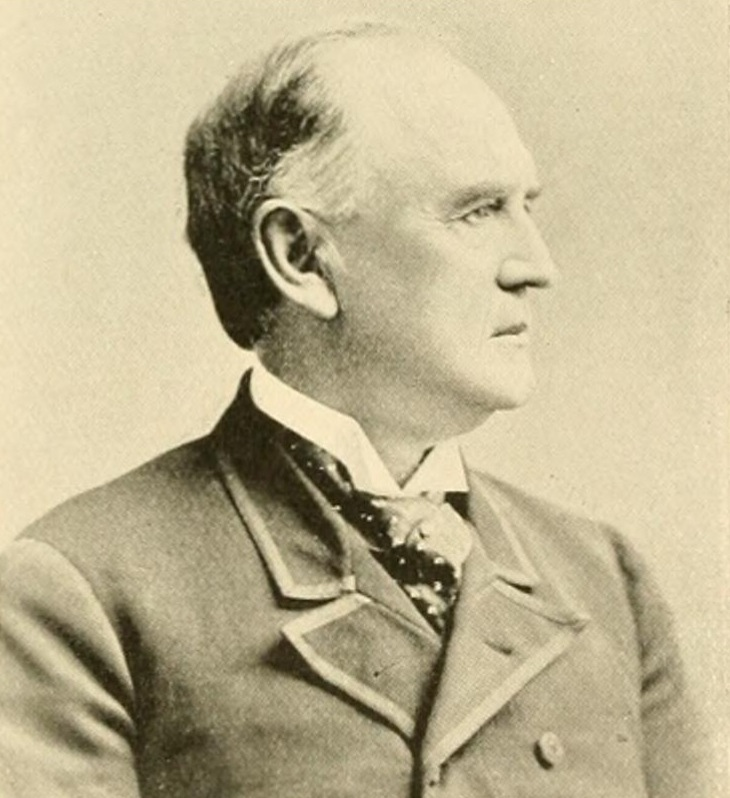
- From 1894's Men of Vermont Illustrated

Member of the Vermont Senate from Windham County
- In office 1860–1862 Serving with John C. Richardson, Parley Starr
- Preceded by: Ranslure W. Clarke, William Harris Jr., Samuel L. Hunt
- Succeeded by: Edward Kirkland, Henry E. Stoughton

Secretary of the Utah Territory
- In office 1850–1852
- Preceded by: None (position created)
- Succeeded by: Benjamin G. Ferris

Register of Probate for Vermont's Marlboro District
- In office 1847–1848
- Preceded by: Royall Tyler Jr.
- Succeeded by: Frederick Holbrook

Personal details
- Born: August 22, 1822 Chesterfield, New Hampshire
- Died: January 19, 1899 (aged 76) Brattleboro, Vermont
- Resting place: Prospect Hill Cemetery, Brattleboro, Vermont
- Party: Whig (before 1854); Republican (from 1854)
- Spouse: Sarah Buell Hollister (m. 1851)
- Children: 1
- Parent(s): Wilder Harris; Harriet (Davies) Harris
- Education: Dartmouth College
- Occupation: Journalist; Businessman; Public official

Broughton Harris (August 16, 1822—January 19, 1899) was a Vermont businessman and political figure. He was Secretary and Treasurer of Utah Territory, and became one of the Runaway Officials of 1851.

== Early life ==
Harris was born in Chesterfield, New Hampshire on August 16, 1822. He was the son of Wilder Harris and Harriet (née Davies) Harris.

He attended Chesterfield Academy and Kimball Union Academy, and graduated from Dartmouth College in 1845. In college he was a member of Phi Beta Kappa and Alpha Delta Phi.

== Career ==
Harris studied law briefly before embarking on a career as a journalist as editor of The Vermont Phoenix and editor and publisher of The Semi-Weekly Eagle, both Whig party newspapers. From 1847 to 1850 Harris was Register of Probate for the Marlboro District.

=== Secretary of Utah Territory ===
In 1850, President Millard Fillmore appointed Harris as Secretary and Treasurer of the newly organized Utah Territory. Harris and two other federal appointees were unable to work cooperatively with territorial Governor Brigham Young, and left the territory without replacements being named.

After an investigation determined that Harris and the other officials had fled the territory without cause, the Fillmore administration ordered the men to return to their posts in the Territory or surrender their commissions. Harris and the others refused and were thus dropped from the territorial government. Harris was subsequently offered appointment as Secretary and acting Governor of New Mexico Territory, which he declined.

=== American Civil War ===
Harris settled in Brattleboro, Vermont. He became a Republican when the party was founded, and he served in the Vermont Senate from 1860 to 1862.

Harris was also one of Vermont's Delegates to the Peace Conference of 1861, which unsuccessfully attempted to prevent the start of the American Civil War.

=== Later career ===
Harris became a partner in Harris Brothers & Company, one of the largest railroad construction corporations in the country, and he was also President of the Brattleboro Savings Bank.

In 1884 Harris was a Delegate to the Republican National Convention.

== Personal life ==
In 1851 Harris married Sarah Buell Hollister, daughter of New York City businessman Edwin M. Hollister. Sarah's nephew was banker and real estate investor Walter E. Maynard. They honeymooned while en route to Salt Lake City for Harris to begin his duties as territorial Secretary. Sarah authored a journal of her 1851 honeymoon trip to Salt Lake City, her experiences in Utah Territory, and the return trip after her husband left his position as territorial Secretary. This journal was later published as An Unwritten Chapter of Salt Lake. Together, they were the parents of a daughter:

- Mary Buell Harris, who married attorney and writer John Seymour Wood.

Broughton Harris died in Brattleboro on January 19, 1899. He was buried at Brattleboro's Prospect Hill Cemetery.
