= Ryland Fletcher =

American politician (1799–1885)

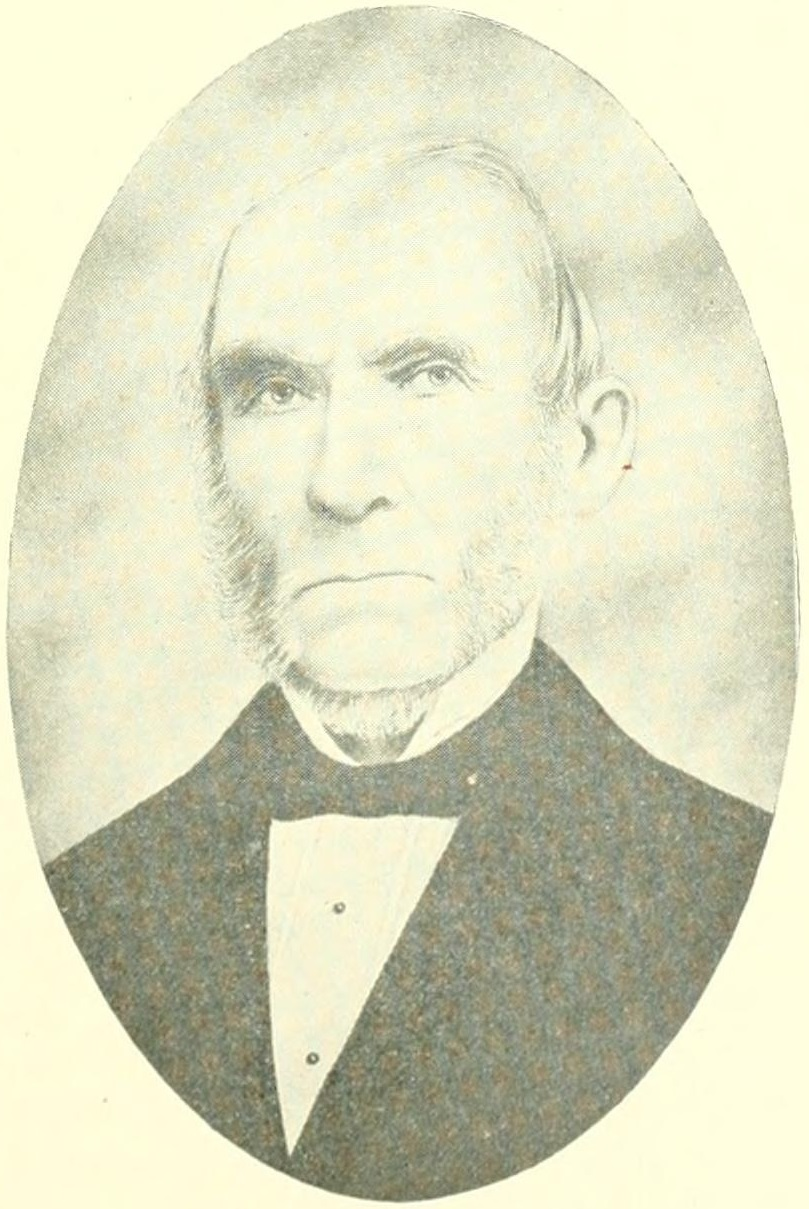
- From Volume 2 of 1911's "History of Norwich University, 1819-1911".

24th Governor of Vermont
- In office October 10, 1856 – October 10, 1858
- Lieutenant: James M. Slade
- Preceded by: Stephen Royce
- Succeeded by: Hiland Hall

20th Lieutenant Governor of Vermont
- In office October 13, 1854 – October 10, 1856
- Governor: Stephen Royce
- Preceded by: Jefferson P. Kidder
- Succeeded by: James M. Slade

Member of the Vermont House of Representatives from Cavendish
- In office 1861–1863
- Preceded by: G. F. David
- Succeeded by: John F. Deane

Personal details
- Born: February 18, 1799 Cavendish, Vermont, US
- Died: December 19, 1885 (aged 86) Proctorsville, Vermont, US
- Resting place: Cavendish Village Cemetery, Cavendish, Vermont
- Party: National Republican; Whig; Liberty Party; Know Nothing; Free Soil; Republican
- Spouse: Mary Ann May m. 1829-1876, her death)
- Children: 3, including Henry A. Fletcher
- Education: Norwich University
- Profession: Farmer

Military service
- Allegiance: United States; Vermont
- Branch/service: Vermont Militia
- Years of service: 1817–1836
- Rank: Brigadier General
- Commands: 3rd Regiment, 2nd Brigade, 1st Division; 2nd Brigade, 1st Division

Ryland Fletcher (February 18, 1799 – December 19, 1885) was an American farmer, politician, the 20th lieutenant governor of Vermont from 1854 to 1856, and then was the 24th governor of Vermont from October 10, 1856, to October 10, 1858.

== Early life ==
Fletcher was born in Cavendish, Vermont, a son of Dr. Asaph Fletcher and Sally (Green) Fletcher. He attended the local schools of Cavendish and worked on his father's farm. He attended Norwich University while teaching school, and graduated in 1824.

== Military service ==
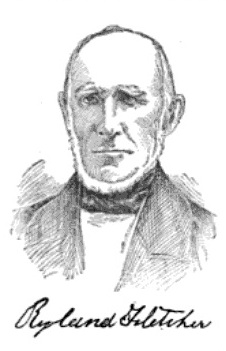

In 1817, Fletcher became a member of the Vermont state militia. He was almost immediately promoted to sergeant, and he continued to advance through the ranks, becoming a first lieutenant in 1818 and a captain in 1820. He was promoted to major in 1826 and lieutenant colonel in 1828. In 1830, Fletcher was promoted to colonel as commander of 3rd Regiment, 2nd Brigade, 1st Division. He was promoted to brigadier general in 1835 as commander of the brigade, and he served until resigning his commission in 1836.

== Career ==
Fletcher was the owner and operator of his family's Cavendish farm, which included horse and cattle breeding. During his career, Fletcher was active in the Windsor County and Vermont Agricultural Societies, and he won prizes for his horses and cows.

He was a noted anti-slavery and temperance advocate, and changed his party affiliation as the anti-slavery movement grew and coalesced from the 1830s to the 1850s, moving from the National Republican Party to the Whigs, Liberty Party, Know Nothing Party, Free Soil Party, and Republican Party. Fletcher was a leader of the Vermont State Temperance Society and the Vermont Anti-Slavery Society, and was known to be active with the Underground Railroad.

As a Know-Nothing, Fletcher opposed mass immigration to the United States, arguing that "immigrants brought with them the 'mortal disease (of) monarchy and despotism, of Romanism and heathenism... which left unchecked would sweep away our most cherished liberties and dearist institutions.'" From the 1830s to the 1850s, Fletcher was frequently chosen as a delegate to the county and state conventions of the parties to which he belonged, and served on his party's county and state committees. In addition, he was an unsuccessful candidate for various offices, including the Vermont Senate and presidential elector. His unsuccessful candidacies served to enhance popular awareness of the movement against slavery and enhanced his own name recognition and reputation.

In 1851, Fletcher was the unsuccessful Free Soil nominee for Lieutenant Governor of Vermont. In 1852, he was the unsuccessful Free Soil nominee for Congress in Vermont's 2nd District. In 1854, Fletcher was the successful lieutenant governor nominee of a coalition that included the Whig, Free Soil and Liberty Parties. Nominated by the newly formed Republican Party, he was re-elected in 1855. He was a strong proponent of biennial rather than annual gubernatorial elections and was a tireless worker for the anti-slavery and temperance causes. After the State House burned down in an 1857 fire, he called a special legislative session to plan for rebuilding. In 1858, he called the first muster and training of the Vermont militia since the Mexican War. That training proved useful at the start of the Civil War.

After leaving the governorship, Fletcher served in the Vermont House of Representatives from 1861 to 1863, and a Presidential Elector for Vermont in 1864. He received the honorary degree of Master of Arts from Dartmouth in 1869. He was a member of the State Constitutional Convention in 1870.

== Death ==
Fletcher died in Cavendish, and is interred at Cavendish Village Cemetery, Cavendish, Vermont.

== Family ==
He married Mary May on June 11, 1829, and they had three children. He was the brother of United States Representative Richard Fletcher and Horace Fletcher; and the father of Henry Addison Fletcher, who served in the Union Army during the Civil War, as a state senator, and as Lieutenant Governor of Vermont.

Party political offices
Preceded by Stephen Smith	Free Soil nominee for Lieutenant Governor of Vermont; 1851	Succeeded by William M. Pingrey
First	Republican nominee for Lieutenant Governor of Vermont; 1854, 1855	Succeeded by James M. Slade
Preceded by Stephen Royce	Republican nominee for Governor of Vermont; 1856, 1857	Succeeded by Hiland Hall
Political offices
Preceded by Jefferson P. Kidder	Lieutenant Governor of Vermont; 1854–1856	Succeeded by James M. Slade
Preceded by Stephen Royce	Governor of Vermont; 1856–1858	Succeeded by Hiland Hall
