= Hiland Hall =

American judge

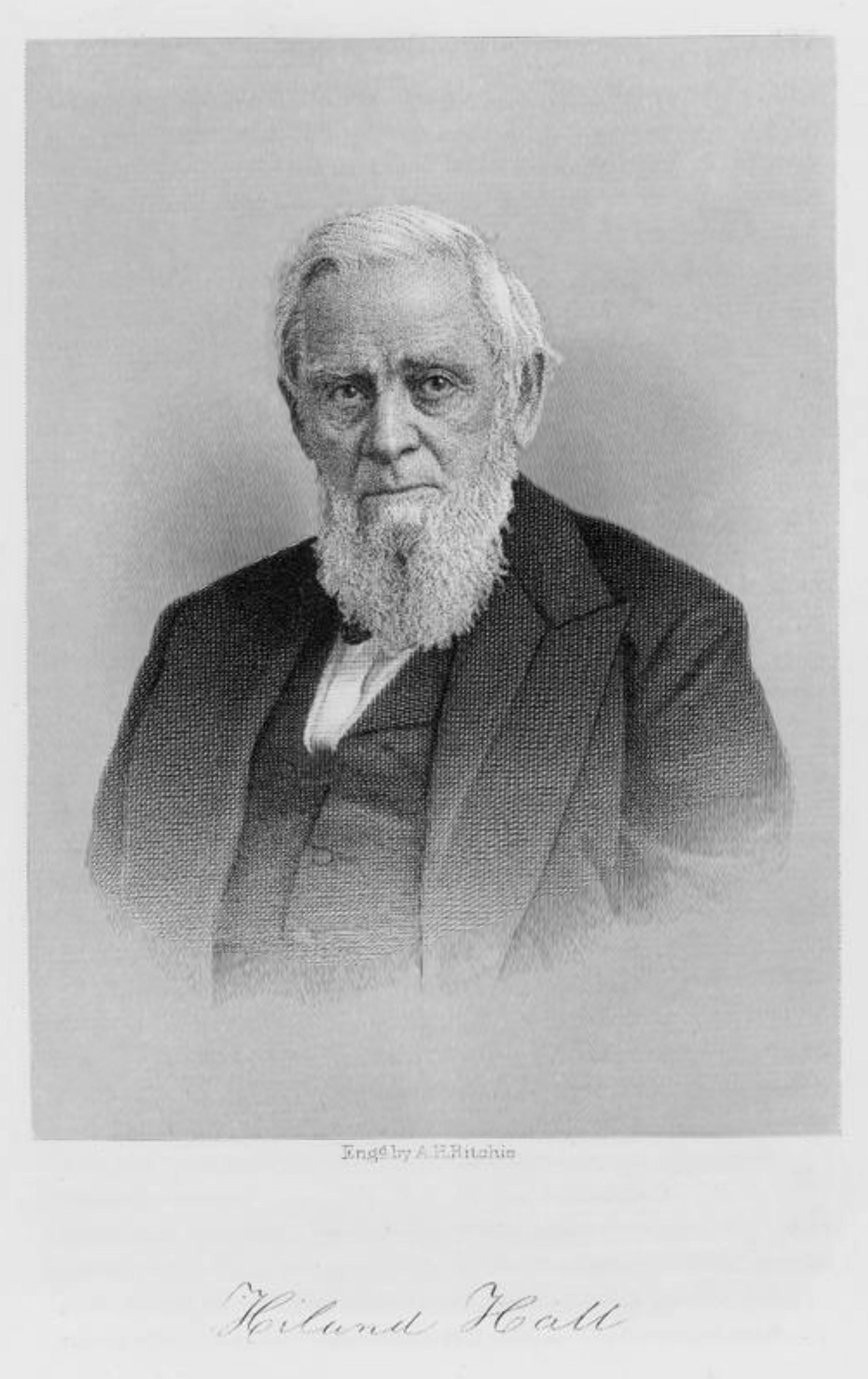

25th Governor of Vermont
- In office October 10, 1858 – October 12, 1860
- Lieutenant: Burnham Martin
- Preceded by: Ryland Fletcher
- Succeeded by: Erastus Fairbanks

Member of the United States House of Representatives from Vermont's 1st district
- In office January 1, 1833 – March 3, 1843
- Preceded by: Jonathan Hunt
- Succeeded by: Solomon Foot

Member of the Vermont House of Representatives
- In office 1827

Personal details
- Born: July 20, 1795 Bennington, Vermont
- Died: December 18, 1885 (aged 90) Springfield, Massachusetts
- Resting place: Old Bennington Cemetery
- Party: Republican
- Spouse: Dolly Tuttle Davis
- Children: 2
- Profession: Lawyer / Judge / Politician

Hiland Hall (July 20, 1795 – December 18, 1885) was an American lawyer and politician who served as 25th governor of Vermont from 1858 to 1860. He also served five consecutive terms as a United States representative from 1833 to 1843.

== Biography ==
Hall was born in Bennington, Vermont. He attended the common schools, studied law with Bennington attorney Marshall Carter, and was admitted to the bar in 1819 and commenced practice in Bennington.

=== Family ===
He married Dolly Tuttle Davis on October 27, 1818, and they had seven children; Marshall Carter (known as M. Carter); Eliza Davis; Henry Davis; Hiland Hubbard; Nathaniel Blatchley; Laura Van Der Spiegle; John Van Der Spiegle; and Charles.

Laura was the wife of businessman and lawyer Trenor W. Park. Elizabeth Hall Park, the daughter of Laura Hall and Trenor Park, was the wife of Governor John G. McCullough.

Hiland Hall originally owned the land where the Park-McCullough Historic House now stands, and sold it to Trenor Park in the 1860s so Park could have a home constructed on it. The Park-McCullough House was added to the National Register of Historic Places in 1972.

== Career ==
Hall was a member of the Vermont House of Representatives in 1827. He served as clerk of Bennington County in 1828 and 1829. He was the county state’s attorney from 1828 to 1831.

=== Congress ===
Hall was elected as an Anti-Jacksonian to the Twenty-second Congress to fill the vacancy caused by the death of Jonathan Hunt. He was re-elected as an Anti-Jacksonian to the Twenty-third and Twenty-fourth Congresses and elected as a Whig to the Twenty-fifth through Twenty-seventh Congresses and served from January 1, 1833 to March 3, 1843. While in Congress he served as chairman of the Committee on Revolutionary Claims (Twenty-seventh Congress). He was not a candidate for renomination in 1842.

=== Political appointments ===
Hall served as the State Bank Commissioner from 1843 to 1846. He was a judge of the Vermont Supreme Court from 1846 to 1850. He was the Second Comptroller of the Treasury from November 27, 1850 to September 10, 1851. He served as United States land commissioner for California from 1851 to 1854, and then returned to Vermont.

=== Governor ===
Hall was the 25th governor of Vermont from 1858 to 1860. He was also a member of the Peace Conference of 1861 held in an effort to prevent the start of the American Civil War.

== Death and legacy ==
Hall died in Springfield, Massachusetts, and is interred in the Old Bennington Cemetery. The Hiland Hall School in Shaftsbury is named for him.

Party political offices
Preceded by Ryland Fletcher	Republican nominee for Governor of Vermont; 1858, 1859	Succeeded by Erastus Fairbanks
U.S. House of Representatives
Preceded by Jonathan Hunt	Member of the U.S. House of Representatives from Vermont's 1st congressional district January 1, 1833 – March 3, 1843	Succeeded by Solomon Foot
Political offices
Preceded by Ryland Fletcher	Governor of Vermont; 1858–1860	Succeeded by Erastus Fairbanks
