= Daniel Chipman Linsley =

American engineer, railroad executive, and politician

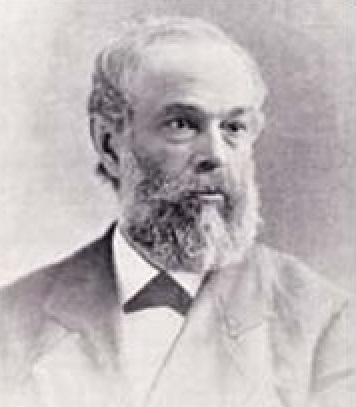

4th Mayor of Burlington
- In office April 3, 1870 – October 6, 1870
- Preceded by: Phineas D. Ballou
- Succeeded by: Torrey E. Wales

Personal details
- Born: April 17, 1827 Middlebury, Vermont, U.S.
- Died: October 7, 1889 (aged 62) New York City, New York, U.S.
- Resting place: Lakeview Cemetery, Burlington, Vermont
- Party: Democratic
- Spouse: Martha Hatch (m. 1858)
- Children: 2
- Parent(s): Charles Linsley; Sarah Chipman Linsley
- Relatives: Joel H. Linsley (uncle); Daniel Chipman (grandfather); Joseph D. Hatch (father-in-law)
- Education: Middlebury College; Norwich University
- Occupation: Engineer

Daniel Chipman Linsley (commonly referred to as D. C. Linsley) (April 17, 1827 – October 7, 1889) was an engineer, businessman, author, and political figure from Vermont. He was most notable for his railroad work which included serving as chief engineer of the Central Vermont Railway and assistant chief engineer of the Northern Pacific Railroad. Linsley was also active in politics and government in his hometown of Burlington, Vermont, and briefly served as Burlington's mayor in 1870.

== Life ==
=== Early life ===
Linsley was born in Middlebury, Vermont, on April 17, 1827, to Charles Linsley and Sarah Chipman. He was named after his mother's father, Daniel Chipman. Linsley was educated at Middlebury Academy and attended Middlebury College and Norwich University from 1844 to 1847. At the end of his college studies, Norwich awarded Linsley a certificate of proficiency in civil engineering.

Linsley became active in politics as a Democrat. In 1846 he was a delegate to the party's state convention and was chosen to record the proceedings as one of the convention's two secretaries.

=== Start of career ===
After becoming qualified as an engineer, Linsley joined the Rutland and Burlington Railroad as an assistant engineer and remained with the B and R until 1852. From 1852 to 1855, Linsley was an engineer and construction contractor on the Kankakee division of the Illinois Central Railroad. From 1855 to 1856, he resided in Middlebury, where he worked on Morgan Horses: A Premium Essay, which was published in 1857. Linsley's work traced the origin and history of the Morgan Horse breed from Justin Morgan's ownership of the foundation sire Figure in the late 1700s to the late 1850s and continues to be regarded as the seminal work on the history of the breed. From 1856 to 1859, Linsley was publisher of the Vermont Stock Journal, a monthly magazine that provided information on breeding and raising farm animals. He later moved the publication to New York City and published it until 1864 as the American Stock Journal.

In the 1860s, Linsley continued his railroad career. He was chief engineer for the Vermont and Canada Railroad and oversaw construction of the tracks from the Lake Champlain docks in Burlington to the railroad depot in Essex Junction. This work included completing the Burlington Tunnel under Burlington's North Avenue, a project that was noteworthy because it required the development and implementation of new techniques for building in loose sand. Contemporary news accounts of the tunnel's construction indicate that the stress associated with the work caused Linsley's hair to turn white prematurely. Additional Linsley projects in Vermont included passenger stations in Burlington and St. Albans, as well as extension of the Central Vermont line from St. Albans to Saint-Jean-sur-Richelieu, Quebec.

Linsley was chief engineer of the Central Vermont from 1860 to 1862, and the Montreal and Vermont Junction Railroad from 1862 to 1865. From 1865 to 1866 he was chief engineer of the Vermont division of the Portland and Ogdensburg Railway, and he was chief engineer of the Lebanon Springs Railroad (upstate New York) from 1866 to 1869.

=== Career in Burlington ===
During the American Civil War, Linsley supported the Union and took part in activities including recruiting drives at which he contributed to cash bonuses paid to newly enlisted soldiers. Linsley's other ventures included a farm on which he grew apples and raised animals including cows, trotting horses and pigs. In addition, he operated a contracting business, D. C. Linsley & Company, which undertook projects including providing gas lighting for the town of Windsor, Vermont.

A Democrat in an era when Republicans dominated Vermont politics, in 1864, Linsley was the party's unsuccessful nominee for member of the Vermont House of Representatives from Burlington. In 1865, Linsley and his brother George formed a partnership to construct a lumber mill in Burlington, which they operated as Linsley's Mills. The business was later operated by new partners as S. S. Churchill & Co. Linsley was the Democratic nominee for lieutenant governor in 1865 and was defeated by Republican Abraham B. Gardner. In 1866, Linsley was again the Democratic nominee for lieutenant governor, and was again defeated by Gardner.

Linsley was active in Burlington's local politics and government despite his party affiliation. He served as city engineer from 1868 to 1869, and a member of the school board from 1869 to 1870. In 1870, Linsley served as Burlington's mayor. He resigned on October 6, 1870, and former mayor Torrey E. Wales served as acting mayor until Linsley's term expired in April 1871. From 1873 to 1875, Linsley was Burlington's superintendent of streets.

=== Later career ===
From 1870 to 1873, Linsley was assistant chief engineer of the Northern Pacific Railroad. In this position, he oversaw construction of lines in Minnesota and Dakota Territory. In 1874, Linsley was one of the organizers and promoters of the Burlington and Lamoille Valley Railroad, and he was its president from 1874 to 1875 and chief engineer from 1875 to 1876. He served as the railway's general manager from 1877 to 1881 and was its president again from 1881 to 1888.

Linsley oversaw construction of the Canada Atlantic Railway between Ottawa and Lacolle, Canada from 1881 to 1888. From 1886 to 1888, he was the railroad's president. In 1886, Linsley moved to New York City, where he promoted the New York and Boston Rapid Transit Company, a venture which proposed to build a direct rail line between New York City and Boston, Massachusetts. Linsley was the company's chief engineer and conducted the initial surveys to determine a route. The work was still in progress at the time of Linsley's death, but the enterprise proved unsuccessful, and the company became defunct. In addition to promoting the Boston to New York City rail line, at the time of his death, Linsley was also working on plans for an elevated railway in New York City.

=== Death ===
Linsley died in New York City on October 7, 1889. His funeral was held at St. Paul's Episcopal Cathedral in Burlington. He was buried at Lakeview Cemetery in Burlington. In addition, his name is included on the monument to Charles Linsley and Sarah Chipman Linsley at Middlebury Cemetery in Middlebury.

=== Family ===
In 1858, Linsley married Martha "Pattie" Hatch of Burlington; her father, Joseph D. Hatch, served as mayor of Burlington from 1876 to 1883. D. C. and Martha Linsley were the parents of two children, Joseph Hatch Linsley, a doctor in New York City, and Fanny, the wife of William M. Brophy.

Linsley's relatives included uncle Joel H. Linsley. Joel Linsley was a prominent minister in the Congregational church and the president of Marietta College.

=== Works by ===
- Linsley, Daniel Chipman (1857). Morgan Horses: A Premium Essay. New York, NY: C. M. Saxton and Company. ISBN 9780608413884 – via Google Books.
- Linsley, Daniel Chipman (1866). Report of D. C. Linsley, Engineer of Burlington City Water Works. Burlington, VT: R. S. Styles – via Google Books.

== Sources ==
=== Books ===
- The National Cyclopaedia of American Biography. Vol. XVI. New York, NY: James T. White & Company. 1918. p. 233 – via Internet Archive.
- Phelps, Edward John (1866). A Sketch of the Life and Character of Charles Linsley. Albany, NY: J. Munsell. p. 5 – via Google Books.
- Vermont House of Representatives (1866). Journal of the House of the State of Vermont. Montpelier, VT: Freeman Steam Printing Establishment. pp. 319–320 – via Google Books.
- Wiley, Edgar J. (1917). Catalogue of the Officers and Students of Middlebury College. Middlebury, VT: Middlebury College. p. 166 – via Internet Archive.

=== Newspapers ===
- "Democratic State Convention". Spirit of the Age. Woodstock, VT. June 25, 1846. p. 2 – via Newspapers.com.
- "Gas in Windsor". Vermont Chronicle. Bellows Falls, VT. March 26, 1861. p. 3 – via Newspapers.com.
- "War Meeting". Burlington Daily Times. Burlington, VT. August 21, 1862. p. 3 – via Newspapers.com.
- "State Fair". Burlington Daily Times. Burlington, VT. September 15, 1863. p. 3 – via Newspapers.com.
- "Democratic Caucus". Burlington Daily Times. Burlington, VT. September 1, 1864. p. 3 – via Newspapers.com.
- "Vote of Burlington". Burlington Daily Times. Burlington, VT. September 7, 1864. p. 3 – via Newspapers.com.
- "Chittenden County Fair: Floral Hall". Burlington Free Press. Burlington, VT. September 28, 1864. p. 2 – via Newspapers.com.
- "Chittenden County Fair: Swine". Burlington Free Press. Burlington, VT. September 29, 1864. p. 2 – via Newspapers.com.
- "The County Fair: The First Day; Cattle". Burlington Daily Times. Burlington, VT. October 1, 1864. p. 2 – via Newspapers.com.
- "Democratic State Ticket". Burlington Weekly Sentinel. Burlington, VT. September 1, 1865. p. 2 – via Newspapers.com.
- Democratic State Ticket. Danville, VT. September 1, 1866. p. 3 – via Newspapers.com.
- "Report of the Canvassing Committee". Burlington Free Press. Burlington, VT. October 12, 1866. p. 3 – via Newspapers.com.
- "Death Notice, Joel H. Linsley". Rutland Herald. Rutland, VT. April 3, 1868. p. 2 – via Newspapers.com.
- "City of Burlington: Board of Aldermen, Monday Oct. 10th". Burlington Free Press. Burlington, VT. October 11, 1870. p. 3 – via Newspapers.com.
- "Death of Hon. D. C. Linsley". Burlington Free Press. Burlington, VT. October 9, 1889. p. 5 – via Newspapers.com.
- "Funeral of Hon. D. C. Linsley". Burlington Free Press. Burlington, VT. October 11, 1889. p. 5 – via Newspapers.com.

=== Internet ===
- adamg (April 27, 2018). "That time a company proposed fast trains to New York - via elevated tracks in the Back Bay". Universal Hub.com. Boston, MA: Adam Gaffin.
- Bourasaw, Noel V. (February 28, 2006). "Biography of Daniel Chipman Linsley". Skagit River Journal.com. Sedro-Woolley, WA: Skagit River Journal of History & Folklore.
- Selleck, Ron; Selleck, Sally; Williams, Linda (2002). "West Cemetery Index". Midddigital. Middlebury, VT: Middlebury College. Archived from the original on December 23, 2019.
