= Burlington Tunnel =

Railroad tunnel in Vermont, United States

Coordinates: 44.4893°N 73.2262°W

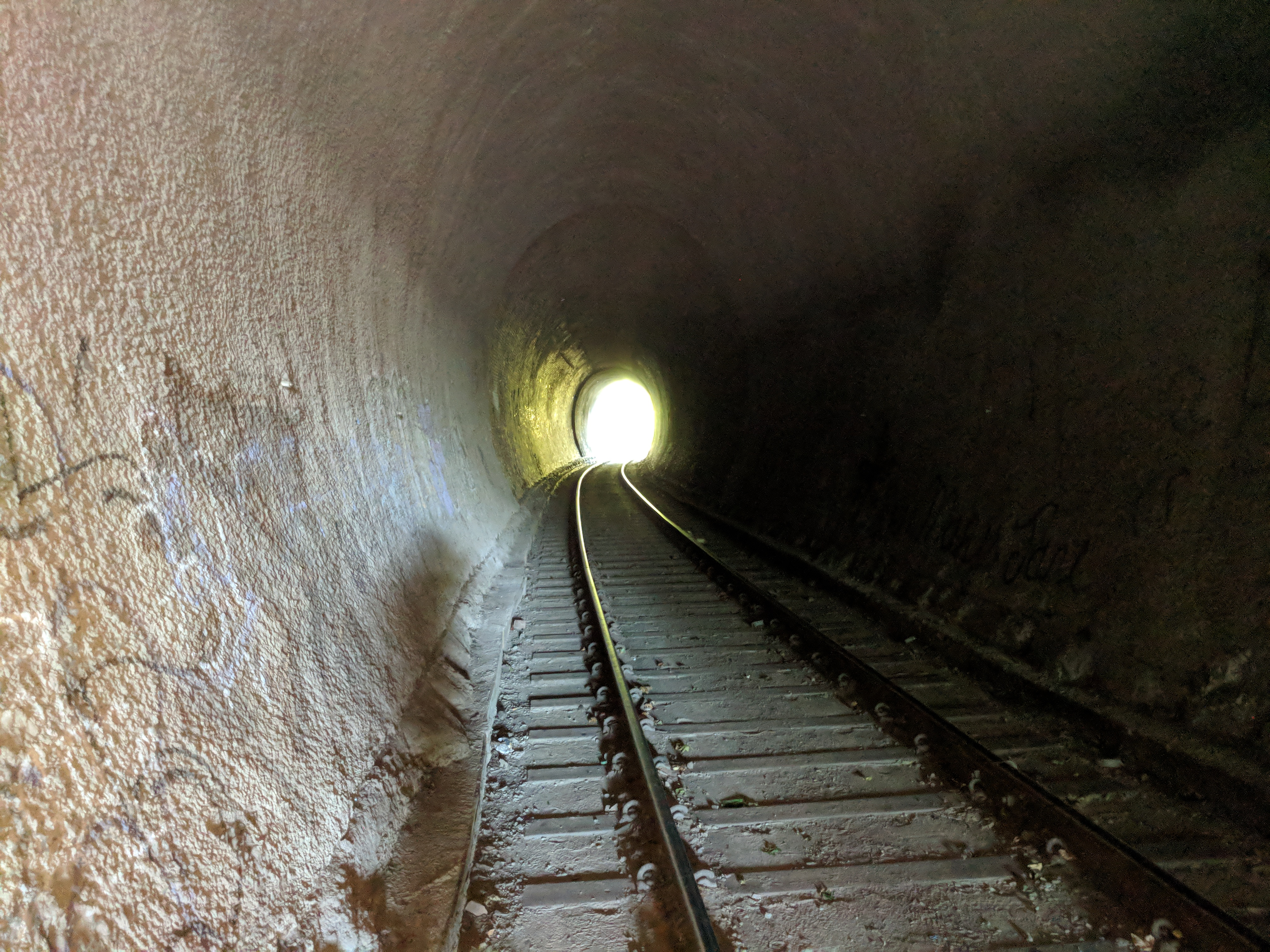
- Inside Burlington Tunnel, looking east
- Interactive map of Burlington Tunnel

Overview
- Line: New England Central Railroad
- Location: Below North Avenue, Burlington, Vermont

Operation
- Work began: November 1, 1860
- Opened: May 1861
- Traffic: train
- Character: freight

Technical
- Length: 340-foot (100 m)
- Operating speed: less than 10 miles per hour (16 km/h)
- Tunnel clearance: 17-foot (5.2 m)
- Grade: generally level

The Burlington Tunnel (also known as the North Avenue Rail Tunnel) is a railroad tunnel located in Burlington, Vermont, and is owned and operated by the New England Central Railroad (NECR). According to the inscription on its southern entrance, the Burlington Tunnel was constructed beginning on 1 November 1860, and completed on 17 May 1861 for a predecessor railroad to the Central Vermont Railway. The tunnel runs in a northeast–southwest curve, while the external approach trackage runs from south to east. The street overpassing the Burlington Tunnel is North Avenue (Functional classification of 16; Urban Minor Arterial) which has an Average Annual Daily Traffic (AADT) of about 12,000 vehicles.

== Tunnel dimensions ==
The Burlington Rail Tunnel, located at Milepost 1.15 of the NECR Winooski spur line, is a 340-foot (100 m) long brick masonry horseshoe shaped tunnel that passes through the sandy ridge supporting North Avenue (Burlington) on a curve of approximately four degrees. North Avenue runs in a north to south direction while the tunnel runs approximately in an east to west direction. The tunnel, constructed in 1860, originally had an overall height of approximately 17 feet (5.2 m) (prior to the 2008 repairs, which lowered the floor of the tunnel) and a width of roughly 14 feet (4.3 m) at the base, increasing to approximately 16 feet (4.9 m) wide at approximately 9 feet (2.7 m) above top of rail. The tunnel provides passage for a single track over ballast. The track grade is generally level. A major gas line runs from a building on the southeast quadrant of the existing tunnel structure easterly across the wetlands and under the Burlington Connector highway (VT Route 127) to the east. There is also an extensive aerial power line system which runs along the railroad right-of-way and up over North Avenue.

== Construction history ==
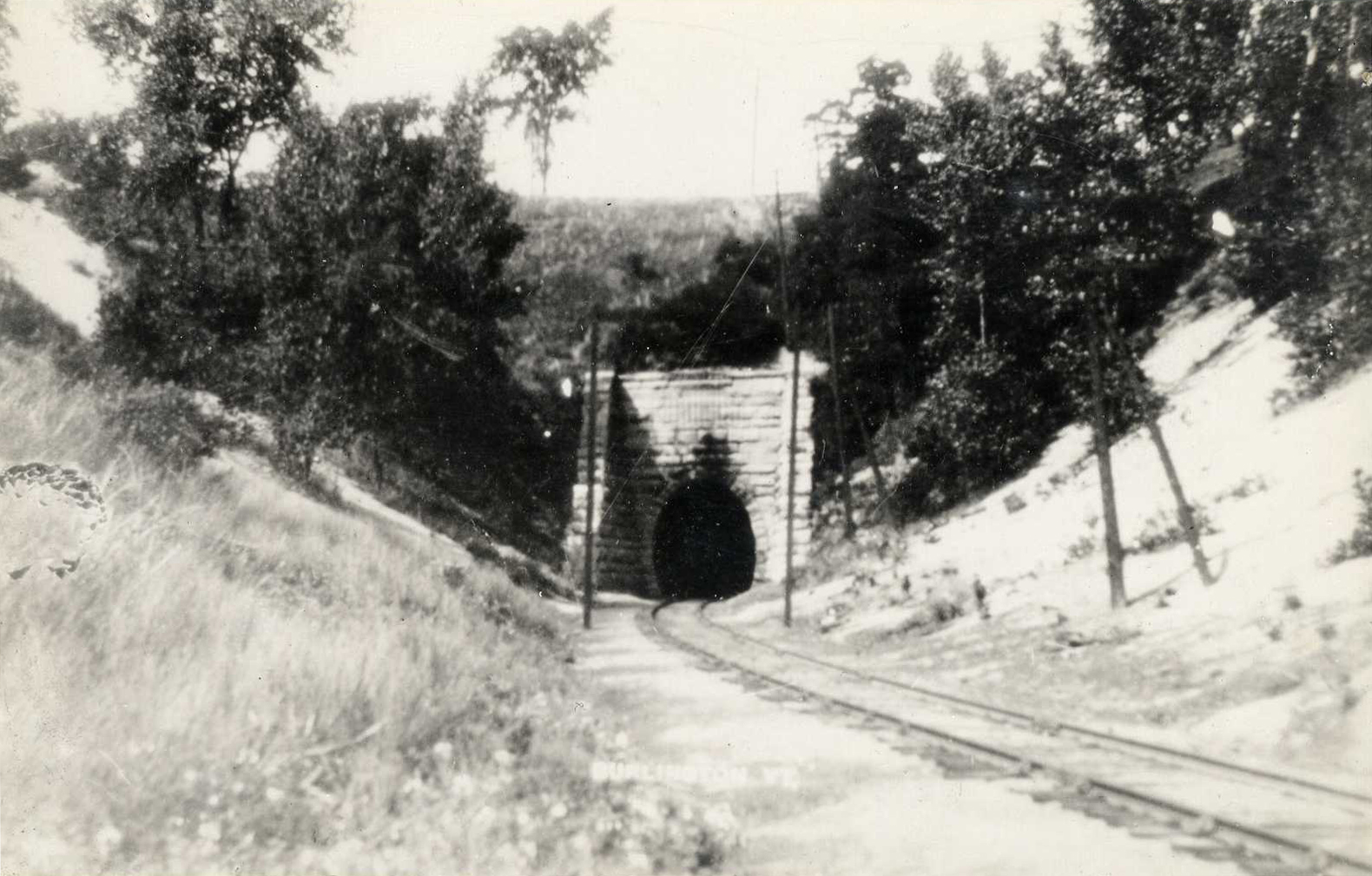
Burlington North Avenue Rail Tunnel (Late 1800s).

The ridge through which the tunnel was constructed consists of loose sands approximately 75 to 80 feet (24 m) deep that had been blown off the east shores of Lake Champlain. The tunnel portals consist of stacked masonry block walls roughly 35 feet (11 m) high and 19 feet (5.8 m) wide at the base. Stepped stone block retaining walls, approximately 47 feet (14 m) long, are located at each side of the track, supporting the embankment. Tunnel construction was accomplished by setting a vertical wooden shield through which holes were bored in a semicircular shape. Poles were then driven through the holes to form the arch shape. The sands were then excavated from underneath the driven poles, and space. As soon as the half-circle heading was completed, the sides were dug. Nearly 700,000 board feet (1,700 m^{3}) of lumber was needed to construct the wooden framework necessary to brace the excavation. After the heading and sides were dug, a foundation of limestone and concrete was constructed. As soon as there was room, a five-layer brick arch in the form of a horseshoe was built. The walls between the brick masonry and the wood form work were packed solid with cement. Under the best conditions, the workers could construct approximately three feet (0.9 m) of tunnel a day. Working day and night, the tunnel was constructed in just over six months.

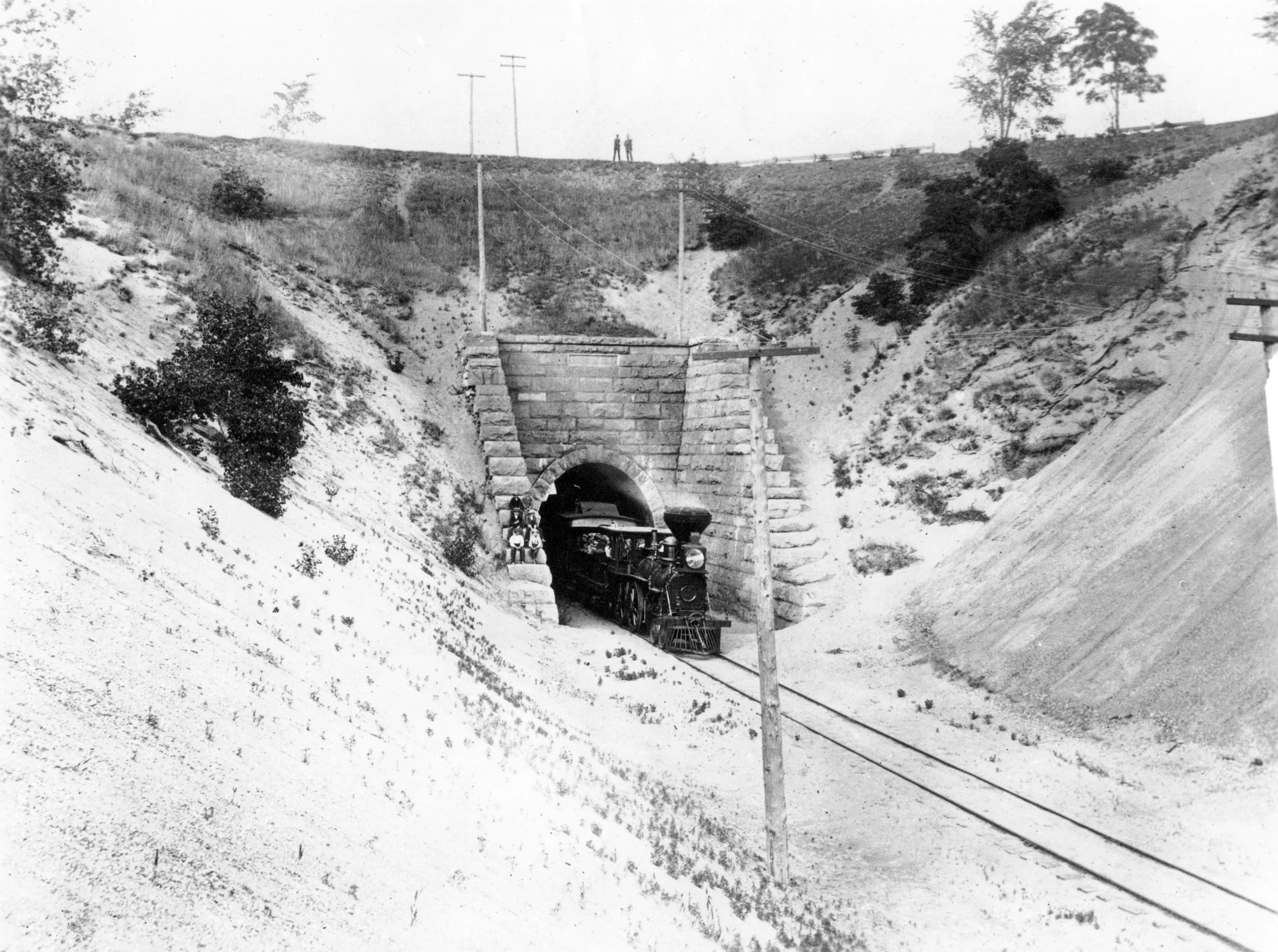
Burlington North Avenue Rail Tunnel (1860s).

The materials in the tunnel are reportedly all of Vermont origin. The portals were constructed of hammer-dressed limestone from the Isle La Motte. The interior brick of the tunnel were obtained from a factory from the north side of Mallets Bay and the mortar was made with lime from Weathersfield, Vermont. Construction appears to be robust as the walls are reportedly four feet (1.2 m) thick and the arch two feet (0.61 m) thick. The bricks are arranged in a running bond pattern. It is noted during the site inspection the lack of bonder or header courses of brick, at least at the surface course of brick. The limestone foundation is exposed along the base of the tunnel as it protrudes above the track bed elevation approximately eight inches (20 cm) and away from the brick masonry arch by approximately eight inches (20 cm).

The Burlington tunnel is considered to be of national historic significance as it was one of the earliest successful railroad tunnels in the United States. While several smaller tunnels were constructed during the 1830s and 1840s, it was the beginning of construction of the Hoosac Tunnel on the Boston to Albany route, through western Massachusetts (begun in 1851) that marked the maturity of American tunneling technology. The next two important tunnel projects in New England were the Burlington Rail Tunnel and the Tunnel at Bellows Falls, in Vermont.

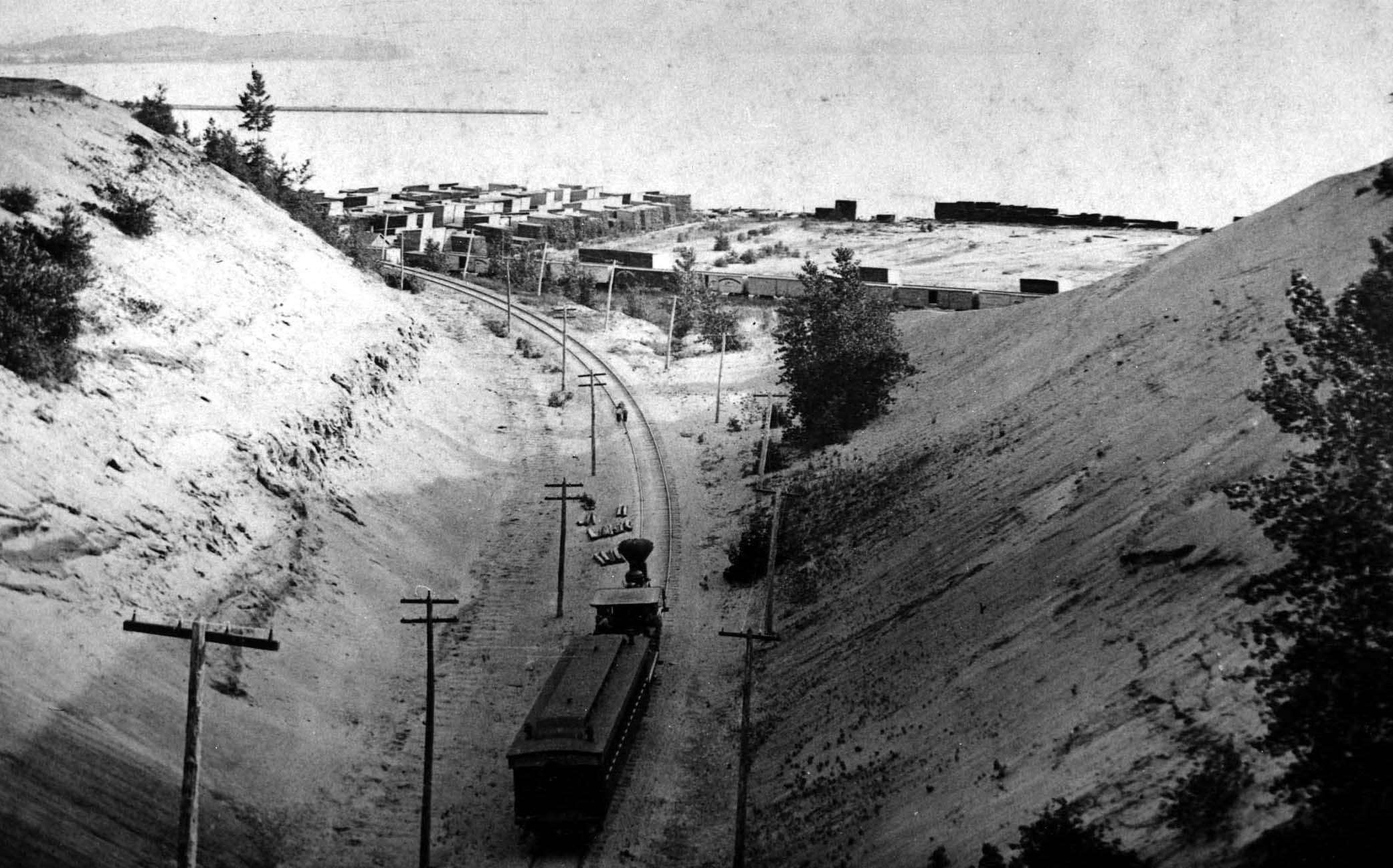
Burlington Railroad Tunnel leading Southwest Towards Burlington Harbor (circa 1870s-1880s).

The Vermont and Canada Railroad, completed between Essex Junction, VT and Rouses Point, NY and headquartered in St. Albans, Vermont, undertook construction of the tunnel in order to provide a better connection to the Lake Champlain lakefront from its main route, which passed through Essex Junction. The Vermont & Canada and the Vermont Central (headquartered in Northfield, VT) merged sometime prior to 1853. The original alignment passed through what is now downtown Burlington, and the depot was located two blocks south of the current City Hall. The 8-mile (13 km) section, part of the original Vermont Central mainline between Windsor, VT and Burlington, VT was completed in 1848. It required three wooden bridges over the Winooski River. These were replaced with steel truss bridges at a later date. At the site of the tunnel, the unusual formation of the ridge—accreted sand rather than underlying ledge—posed an enormous challenge to Daniel Chipman Linsley, engineer (1827–1889), and D.J. Morrison, construction chief, who both worked for the railroad. Reportedly Daniel Chipman Linsley's hair turned white prematurely, possibly resulting from the stress of the project. Linsley and Morrison had a wooden arch built that matched the intended shape of the tunnel, then advanced the wooden arch close behind the digging to support the ceiling of the newly bored hole. The concrete fill was laid in above the wooden arch, and the bricklaying crews finished the lining once the wooden arch rate of some 3 feet (0.9 m) per day. The crew of 85 workers, split into 12-hour shifts so that work could progress 24 hours a day, labored through the winter of 1860–1861 to complete the tunnel by May 1861.

== History of use ==
During the beginning of the 20th century, up to eleven passenger trains a day would pass through the tunnel. However, by the early 1930s, this number had dwindled to one passenger train per day. The last passenger train passed through the tunnel in June 1938. Currently, the tunnel only services transfer freight service by the New England Central Railroad to the Burlington yard operated by the Vermont Railway.

== 2002 assessment ==
The Burlington Tunnel is owned and operated by the New England Central Railroad (NECR) and had been in a state of internal deterioration for some years and has had limited clearance for large freight cars. According to a 1998 study by Gordon, Bua, & Read, Inc. the tunnel was found to be "deficient in vertical clearance ... with respect to Plate H (i.e. double-stack rail-car clearance code designated by the Association of American Railroads) with 6-inch (150 mm) buffer requirements". The study thereby considered two alternatives to accommodate double-stack cars: 1. lowering the track, and 2. constructing a new tunnel on a new alignment, reducing the curvature inside the tunnel.

The stones that line the western portal are all intact. However, there is light mortar loose between stones. Step type cracking had been observed beginning at the north side of the arch ring, two stones below the crown during the 2002 assessment. The cracking had worked its way up and to the south through approximately six courses of stone. No additional movement or displacement of stone has seemed to have occurred. During a file search (inquiry conducted by DMJM Harris, 2002) in the Saint Albans office of the New England Central Railroad, photos of the west portal taken during the 1960s highlighted this same portal cracking. The condition does not appear to have changed since. The stone masonry retaining walls have also been observed to be intact and plumb. The stones that compose the portal ring extend between 30 and 36 inches (76 and 91 cm) from the face of the portal where they interface with the brick lining.

Of greatest concern is the overall stability of the embankment (especially the southeast embankment where heavy erosion has been noted). From the 2002 examination of the site topography and geology it was anticipated that the groundwater level would be found below the level of the tracks. This was confirmed during 2008 repairs. The southeast embankment generally experiences significant surface runoff from snow-melt and rain. This runoff is directed down the embankment where the ground soil covering the tunnel is reduced.

It is the end sections of the tunnel that have taken the brunt of the storm water runoff impacts over the years, which may have affected the structural integrity of the tunnel. It is unknown what the condition of the original tunnel form-work behind the brick arch is, and how potential deterioration may have impacted the condition of the tunnel. The 2002 assessment considered that the first 35 feet (11 m) of the tunnel from the west portal, and the first 25 feet (7.6 m) from the east portal were heavily distressed. Cracking through the brick and significant loss of face brick was prevalent these areas. The lack of bonder or header courses of brick had allowed for significant delamination of the face brick away from the backing courses. Water infiltration was thought to be the primary cause of this deterioration.

== Current condition ==
In October 2008, a portion of the Tunnel was relined by Johnson Western Gunite Company of Seattle, WA using shotcrete methods. ECI Rail Constructors, Inc. of Williston, VT concurrently lowered the tracks to offset the 6-inch (15 cm) shotcrete layer and to structurally brace the tunnel at the new floor elevation. The new track structure consisted of steel ties and steel reinforcing encased in concrete. The completed work allows for a Plate-C car to pass with required minimum clearances. The project was completed at a cost of about $1.2 million ($240,000 paid by NECR and $960,000 covered by federal funds). The repairs are estimated to last about 50 years.

In November 2010, ECI conducted an inspection of the tunnel and did not observe any fracturing of the new surface, which indicated that the cracks had not opened further, nor was there continued movement of the lining walls since the 2008 repairs. A follow up report on the project stated; "The tunnel, including the shotcrete walls, the unshotcreted walls, the portals, and rigid track structure appeared in excellent condition."

The current permitted speed limit for trains operating through the tunnel is less than 10 miles per hour (16 km/h).

== Photo gallery ==
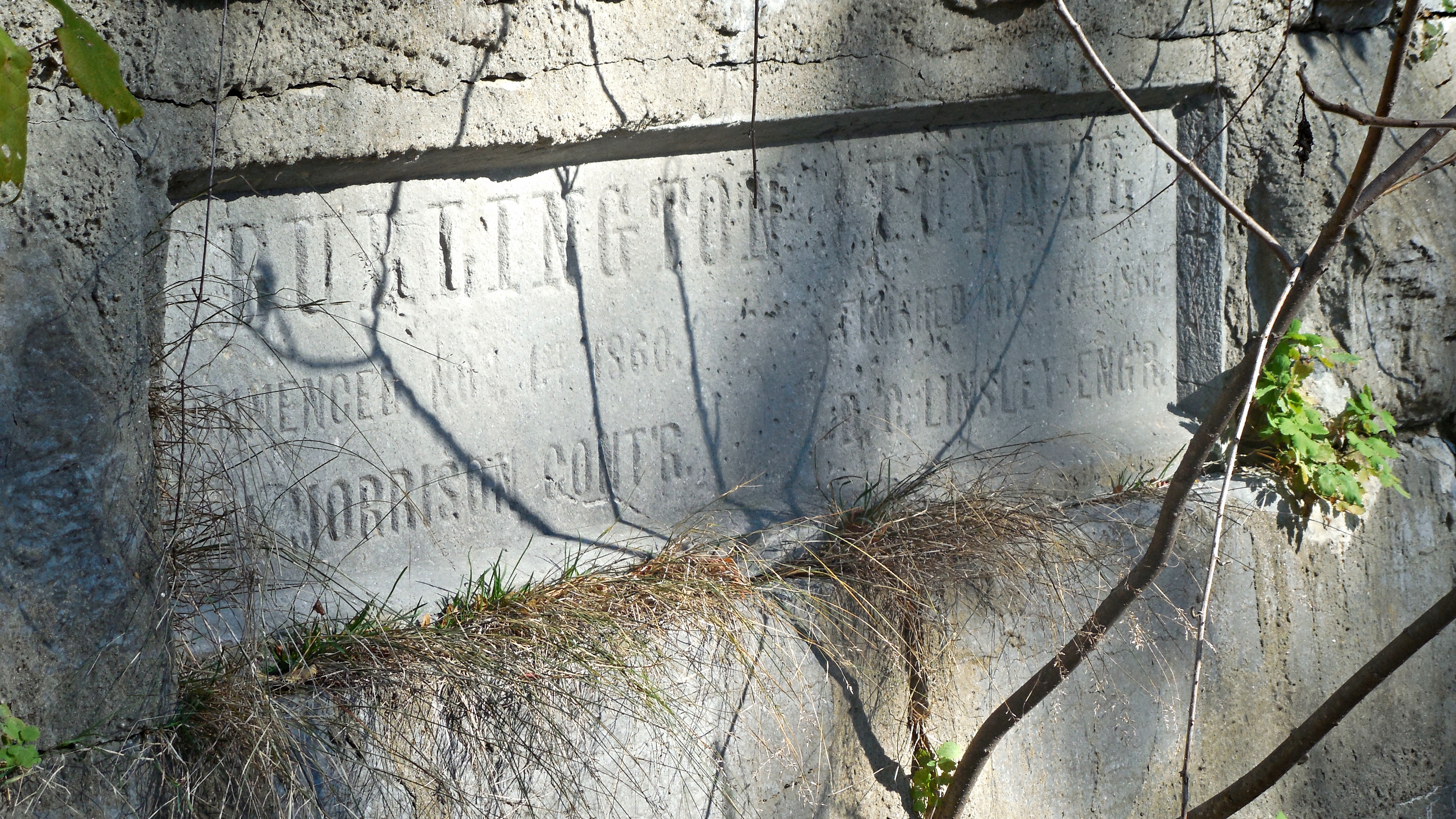
South portal tablet: "Burlington Tunnel Commenced Nov. 1st, 1860 - Finished May 17th, 1861 - D.J. Morrison Cont'r. - D.C. Linsley Engr."

Burlington, North Avenue Rail Tunnel Northern Portal: Sep 2007

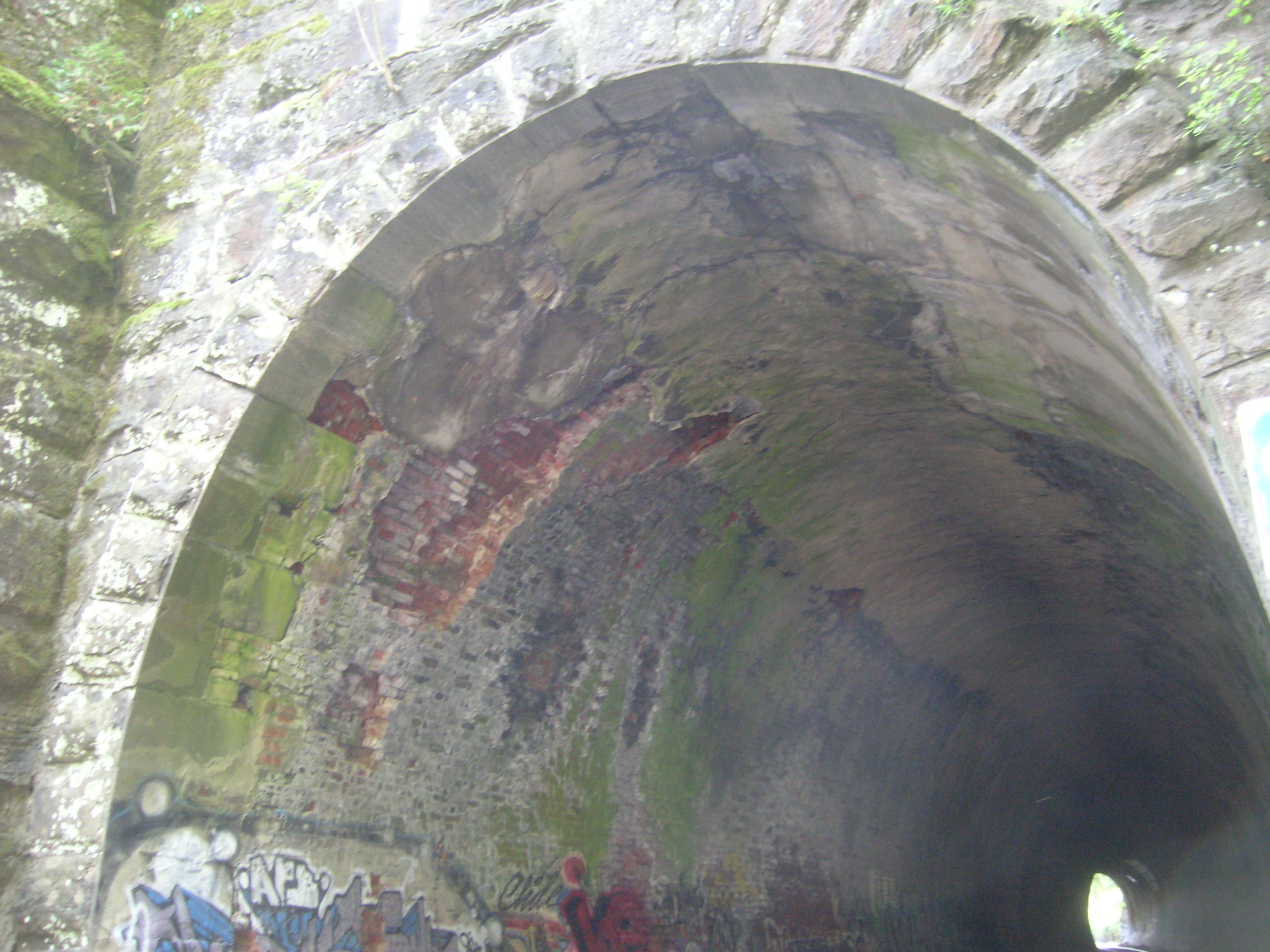
Burlington Rail Tunnel from the northeast portal, looking south: Aug 2007

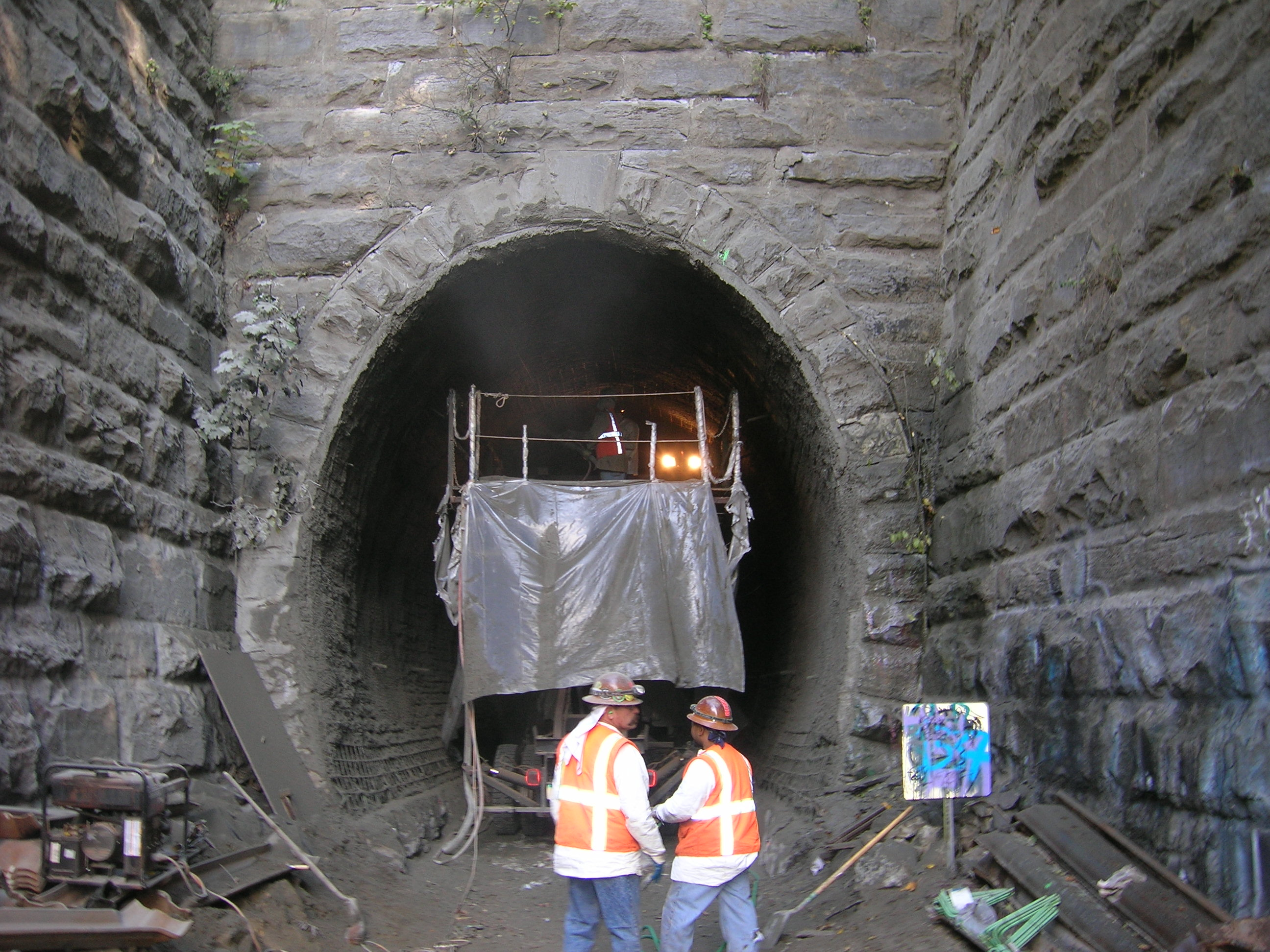
Shotcrete Application (Southern Portal): Oct 2008

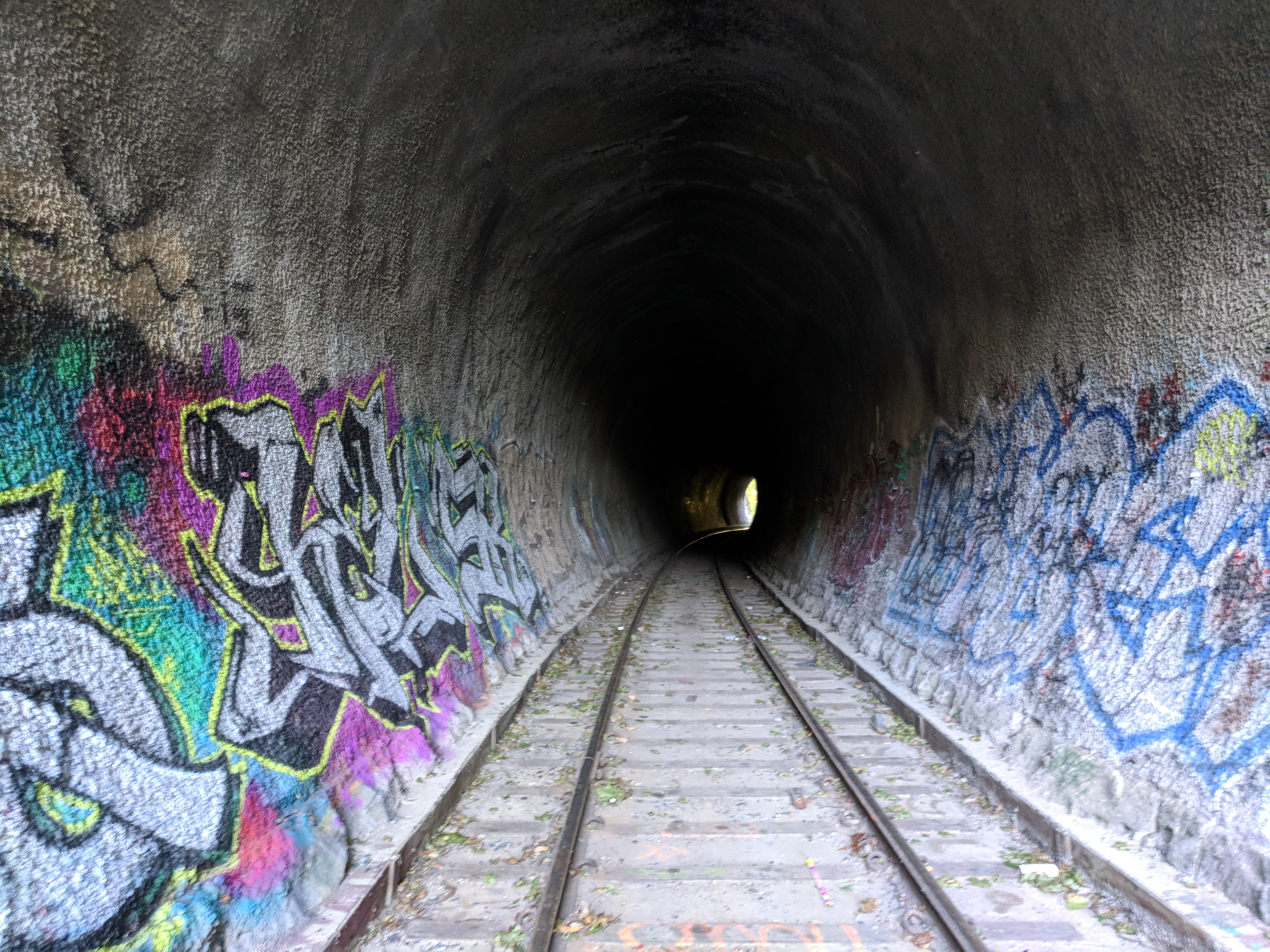
Burlington Tunnel inside: September 2018
