= New York and Boston Railroad =

Several railroad companies have been called the New York and Boston Railroad:

- New York and Boston Railroad (1869–1872) of New York, predecessor of the New York Central Railroad
- New York and Boston Railroad (1846–1865) of Connecticut, predecessor of the New York, New Haven and Hartford Railroad
- New York and Boston Inland Railroad, formed in 1882 and never built
- New York and Boston Rapid Transit Company, a never-built plan in the mid-1880s
