= Torrey E. Wales =

Mayor of Burlington, Vermont

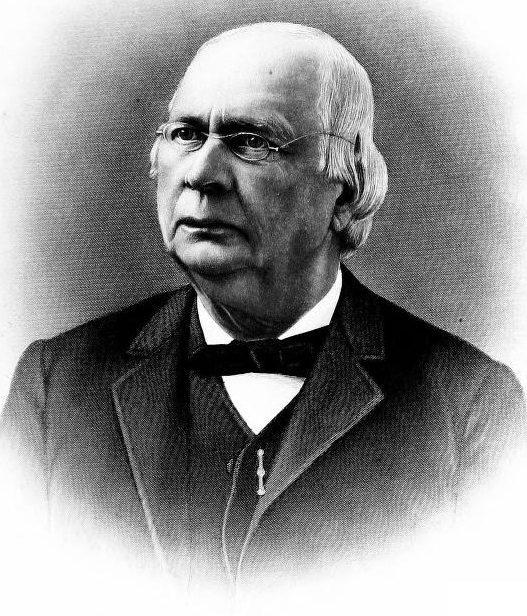
- From 1886's History of Chittenden County, Vermont

Acting Mayor of Burlington
- In office October 6, 1870 – April 3, 1871
- Preceded by: Daniel Chipman Linsley
- Succeeded by: Luther C. Dodge

2nd Mayor of Burlington
- In office April 2, 1866 – April 7, 1868
- Preceded by: Albert L. Catlin
- Succeeded by: Phineas D. Ballou

Member of the Burlington, Vermont Board of Aldermen
- In office 1874–1875
- In office 1869–1871

Member of the Vermont House of Representatives from Burlington
- In office 1876–1878
- Preceded by: Bradley Smalley
- Succeeded by: Bradley B. Smalley
- In office 1868–1870
- Preceded by: Fred M. Van Sicklen
- Succeeded by: Walter Carpenter

Judge of the Chittenden County, Vermont Probate Court
- In office 1862–1898
- Preceded by: Roswell B. Fay
- Succeeded by: Marcellus A. Bingham

State's Attorney of Chittenden County, Vermont
- In office 1854–1857
- Preceded by: Levi Underwood
- Succeeded by: E. R. Hard

Personal details
- Born: Torrey Eglesby Wales; June 20, 1820 Westford, Vermont
- Died: July 5, 1902 (aged 82) Burlington, Vermont
- Resting place: Lakeview Cemetery, Burlington, Vermont
- Party: Republican (from 1854)
- Other political affiliations: Whig (before 1854)
- Spouse(s): Elizabeth C. Mason (m. 1846-1886, her death); Helen M. Mason (m. 1888-1895, her death)
- Children: 2
- Education: University of Vermont
- Profession: Attorney

Torrey Eglesby Wales (June 20, 1820 – July 5, 1902) was an American politician who served as the 2nd Mayor of Burlington, Vermont.

== Early life ==
Torrey E. Wales was born in Westford, Vermont on June 20, 1820, to Danforth Wales and Louisa Sibley. Danforth was a successful clothier whose business interests later included a gristmill and a sawmill, and he represented Westford for several terms in the Vermont House of Representatives. Louisa died in 1822 and Danforth married Alice Cushman.

Wales was educated in the schools of Westford and nearby towns. He attended the University of Vermont, where he was a member of the board of trustees later in life, from 1837 to 1841, and studied law under with Archibald Hyde and later Asahel Peck. He admitted to the bar in 1845, and practiced in Burlington, Vermont.

== Legal and business career ==
Wales sought a warmer climate in Holly Springs, Mississippi in 1846 due to illness and lived there for three years. During his time there he worked as a tutor for a plantation-owning family. After returning to Burlington he resumed practicing law. Prior to the American Civil War, Wales was active in a Burlington militia company, the Howard Guards, and was volunteer fire fighter as a member of Burlington's Boxer Company. He was among the founders of Mary Fletcher Hospital and served as its treasurer. He was a deacon at the College Street Congregational Church for fifteen years.

Russell S. Taft studied law under Wales and the two men formed a law firm in 1857, which lasted until 1878. Wales formed Wales & Wales, a law firm with his son George W. Wales, in 1882, and it lasted until George's death in 1890.

== Political career ==
=== Chittenden County ===
Originally a Whig, and later a Republican, Wales was long active in Vermont politics and government. In 1854, Wales was elected State's Attorney of Chittenden County, and he served until 1857. In 1862, he was elected the county's probate court judge, and he served until 1898.

=== Burlington ===
In 1854, he was elected to Burlington's board of selectmen. After Burlington was incorporated as a city, he served as its second mayor from 1866 to 1868. He served on the board of aldermen from 1869 to 1871, and performed the mayor's duties after the resignation of Daniel Chipman Linsley. He again served as an alderman from 1874 to 1875. From 1883 to 1884, Wales was Burlington's city attorney. Among the other offices in which Wales served the city were justice of the peace and street commissioner.

=== State legislature ===
In 1868 and 1869, Wales was elected to represent Burlington in the Vermont House of Representatives. He was elected to the Vermont House again in 1876 and served until 1878.

== Death and burial ==
On July 5, 1902 Wales died at his home in Burlington. The funeral took place in Burlington at the Congregational Church on College Street. He was buried at Lakeview Cemetery in Burlington.

== Family ==
Wales married Elizabeth Chickering Mason in February 1846, with whom he had two children before her death on April 12, 1886. In July 1888, he married Helen M. White (nee Mason), a niece of his first wife, and remained married until her death in 1896.

In April 1868, George Wales was accidentally shot in the lung by the instructor who was teaching him business writing at a Burlington commercial college. George served as private secretary for U.S. Senators Justin Smith Morrill and Henry L. Dawes, and Secretary of Civil and Military Affairs (chief assistant) to Governor John L. Barstow.

== Works cited ==
- Carleton, Hiram (1903). Genealogical and Family History of the State of Vermont: A Record of the Achievements of Her People in the Making of a Commonwealth and the Founding of a Nation. Lewis Publishing Company.
