= Charles Davis (Vermont judge) =

American judge (1789–1863)

Member of the Vermont House of Representatives from Danville
- In office 1851–1852
- Preceded by: Harvey T. Moore
- Succeeded by: None (no selection made)

Associate Justice of the Vermont Supreme Court
- In office 1846–1848
- Preceded by: None (Newly created seat)
- Succeeded by: Luke P. Poland

Probate Judge of Caledonia County, Vermont
- In office 1846–1847
- Preceded by: Samuel B. Mattocks
- Succeeded by: Charles S. Dana

United States Attorney for the District of Vermont
- In office 1841–1845
- Preceded by: Daniel Kellogg
- Succeeded by: Charles Linsley

State's Attorney of Caledonia County, Vermont
- In office 1838–1839
- Preceded by: George C. Cahoon
- Succeeded by: Thomas Bartlett Jr.
- In office 1828–1834
- Preceded by: Isaac Fletcher
- Succeeded by: George C.Cahoon

Personal details
- Born: January 1, 1789 Mansfield, Connecticut
- Died: November 21, 1863 (aged 74) Rockford, Illinois
- Resting place: Cedar Bluff Cemetery, Rockford, Illinois
- Party: Whig
- Spouse: Lucinda Stone (m. 1814–1863, his death)
- Children: 5
- Education: Middlebury College
- Profession: Attorney

Charles Davis (January 1, 1789 – November 21, 1863) was a Vermont attorney and judge who served as an associate justice of the Vermont Supreme Court from 1846 to 1847.

== Biography ==
Charles Davis was born in Mansfield, Connecticut on January 1, 1789, the son of Philip Davis (d. 1822) and Christiana (Crosby) Davis. Philip Davis moved his family to Rockingham, Vermont in 1792, and Middlebury, Vermont in 1806. Davis was educated in Rockingham and Middlebury, and in 1808 was admitted to the sophomore class at Middlebury College. He graduated in 1811, and began to study law with Daniel Chipman.

Davis edited the Vermont Mirror, a newspaper opposed to the War of 1812, but also served in the Vermont Militia when Vermont was threatened by a British invasion from Canada. He was admitted to the bar in 1814, and practiced in Middlebury until moving to Barton in 1816. In 1818, he moved to Waterford, and in 1828 he moved to Danville. In 1828, Davis was elected State's Attorney of Caledonia County, and he served until 1834. In 1831, Davis served as Clerk of the Vermont House of Representatives. He returned to the State's Attorney position in 1838, and served until 1839.

Davis became a Whig when the party was founded. When Whig nominee William Henry Harrison won the presidency in 1841, Davis was appointed United States Attorney for the District of Vermont; he served until 1845, when he became Judge of the Caledonia County Probate Court. He served until 1846, when he was appointed to the Vermont Supreme Court. He was a member of the Supreme Court until 1848, when he resumed the practice of law in Danville. In 1851, he was elected to the Vermont House of Representatives, and served one term.

== Retirement and death ==
In retirement, Davis and his wife moved to Rockford, Illinois, where they resided with their son Isaac Fletcher Davis. Charles Davis died in Rockford on November 21, 1863. He was buried at Cedar Bluff Cemetery in Rockford.

== Family ==
In 1814, Davis married Lucinda Stone of Chesterfield, New Hampshire (d. 1884). They were the parents of five children: Charles; Philip; Norman; Isaac Fletcher; and Ellen.

== Sources ==
=== Books ===
- Baldwin, Frederick W. (1886). Biography of the Bar of Orleans County, Vermont. Montpelier, VT: Vermont Watchman and State Journal Press.
- Wiley, Edgar J. (1917). Catalogue of Officers and Students of Middlebury College. Middlebury, VT: Middlebury College.

=== Internet ===
- "Burials at Cedar Bluff Cemetery". rootsweb.ancestry.com. Rockford, IL: Cedar Bluff Cemetery Association.

Political offices
| Preceded by Newly created seat | Justice of the Vermont Supreme Court; 1846–1848 | Succeeded by Luke P. Poland |
