= Starksboro, Vermont =

- Town
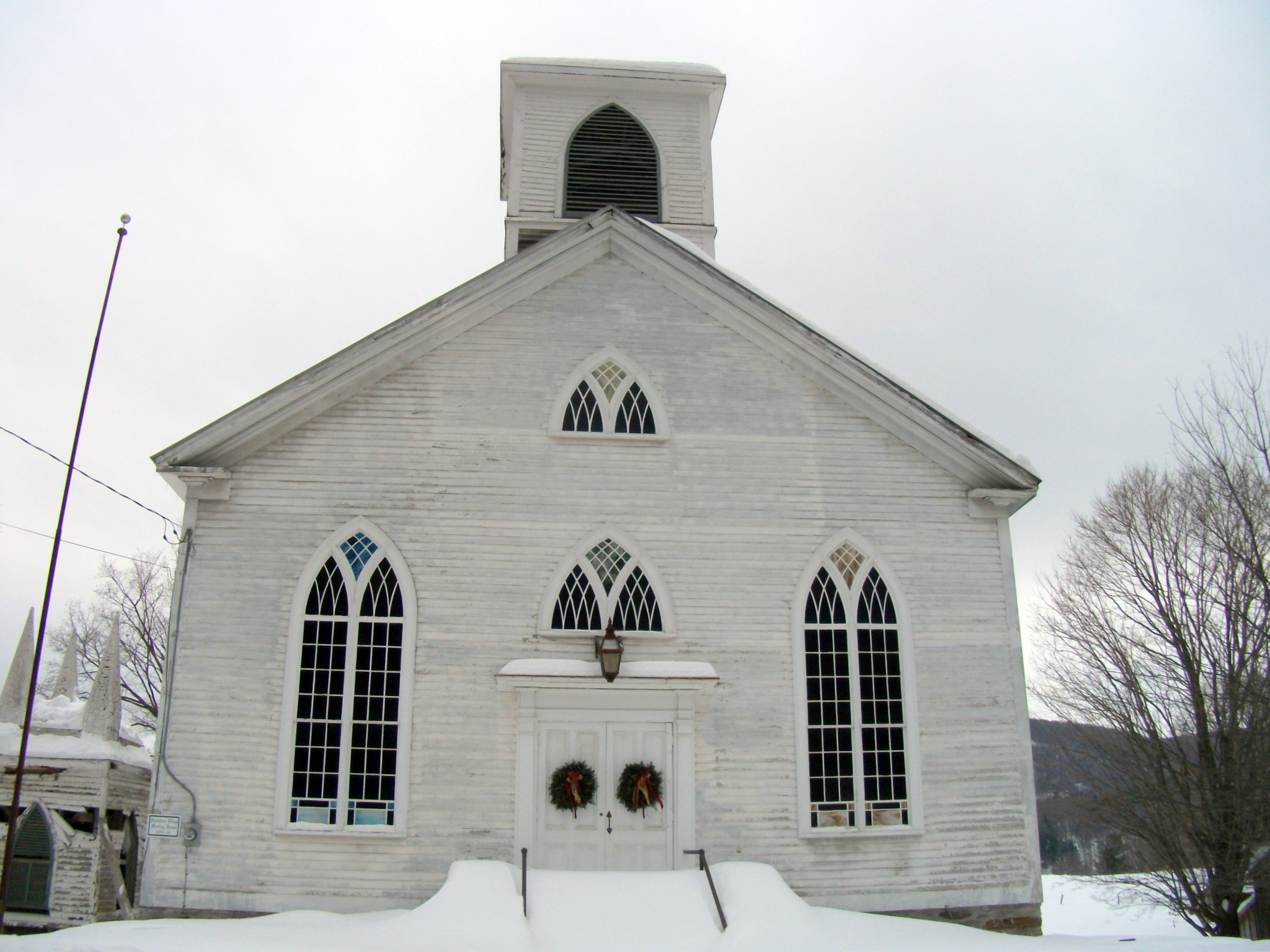
- Starksboro Village Meeting House

- Location in Addison County and the state of Vermont
- Coordinates: 44°14′22″N 73°00′57″W
- Country: United States
- State: Vermont
- County: Addison
- Communities: Starksboro; Jerusalem

Area
  - Total: 45.9 sq mi (118.8 km^{2})
  - Land: 45.7 sq mi (118.3 km^{2})
  - Water: 0.19 sq mi (0.5 km^{2})
- Elevation: 1,709 ft (521 m)

Population (2020)
  - Total: 1,756
  - Density: 38/sq mi (14.8/km^{2})
- Time zone: UTC-5 (Eastern (EST))
  - Summer (DST): UTC-4 (EDT)
- ZIP codes: 05487 (Starksboro); 05443 (Bristol)
- Area code: 802
- FIPS code: 50-70075
- GNIS feature ID: 1462217
- Website: www.starksborovt.org

Starksboro is a town in Addison County, Vermont, United States. The population was 1,756 at the 2020 census.

== Geography ==
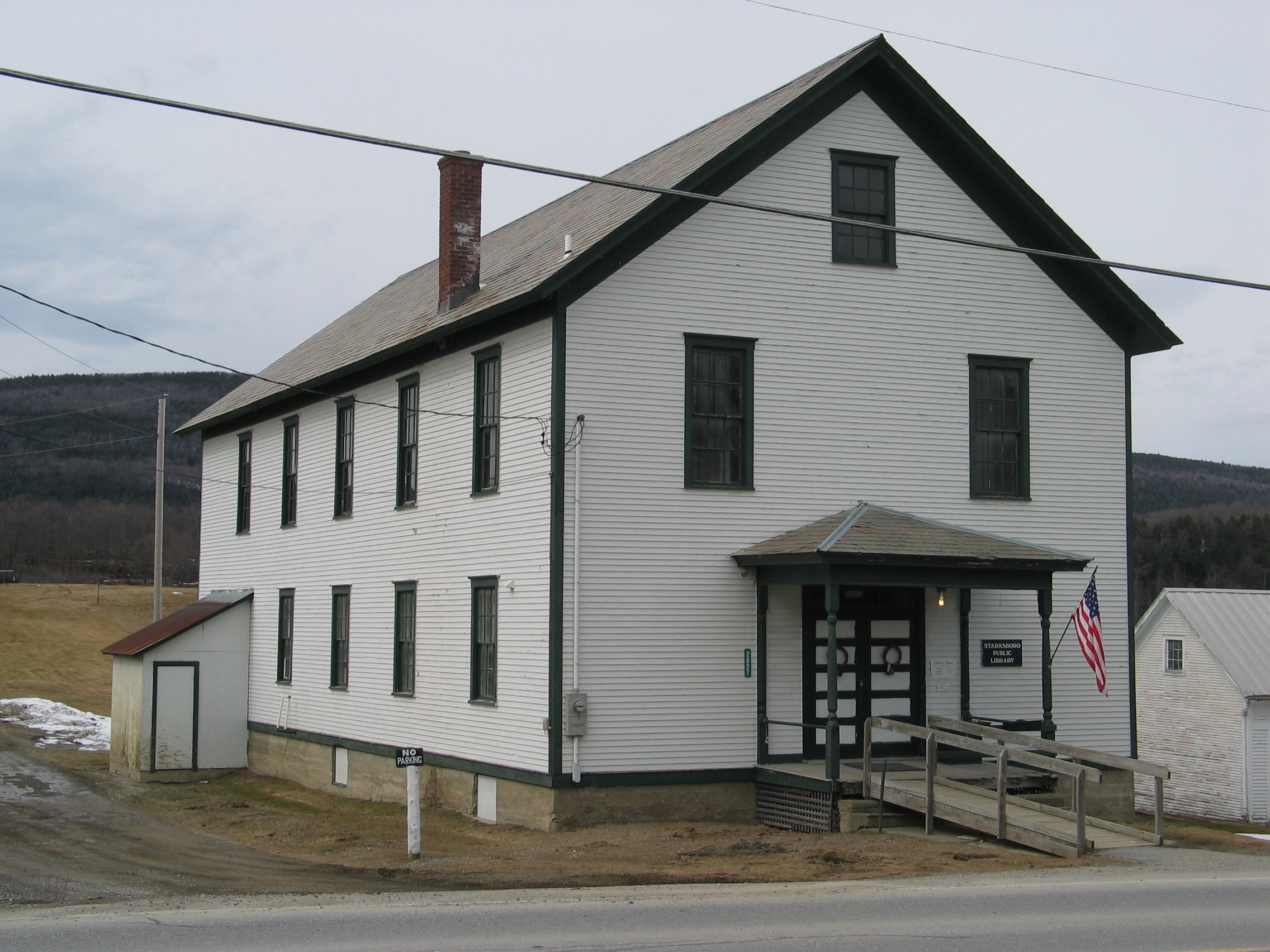
Starksboro Public Library

Starksboro is located in the northeast corner of Addison County, along the western edge of the Green Mountains. Vermont Route 116 runs through the town center, leading north to Hinesburg and South Burlington and south to Bristol and East Middlebury. Vermont Route 17 crosses the southern part of the town, leading east across the Green Mountains to Mad River Glen ski area and the town of Waitsfield, and west to Bristol and the Champlain Valley.

According to the United States Census Bureau, Starksboro has a total area of 45.9 square miles (118.8 km^{2}), of which 45.7 square miles (118.3 km^{2}) is land and 0.19 square miles (0.5 km^{2}), or 0.42%, is water.

== History ==
The Town was named after John Stark, a prominent Officer from the New Hampshire Militia during the Revolutionary War. The Robinson Elementary School is named in honor of Albert J. Robinson, who helped build the school. Starksboro was chartered by state legislation on November 9, 1780.

== Demographics ==
Historical population
Census	Pop.	Note	%±
1790	40		—
1800	359		797.5%
1810	726		102.2%
1820	914		25.9%
1830	1,342		46.8%
1840	1,263		−5.9%
1850	1,400		10.8%
1860	1,437		2.6%
1870	1,361		−5.3%
1880	1,249		−8.2%
1890	1,070		−14.3%
1900	902		−15.7%
1910	835		−7.4%
1920	806		−3.5%
1930	687		−14.8%
1940	744		8.3%
1950	576		−22.6%
1960	502		−12.8%
1970	668		33.1%
1980	1,336		100.0%
1990	1,511		13.1%
2000	1,898		25.6%
2010	1,777		−6.4%
2020	1,756		−1.2%
U.S. Decennial Census

As of the census of 2000, there were 1,898 people, 668 households, and 488 families residing in the town. The population density was 41.7 people per square mile (16.1/km^{2}). There were 765 housing units at an average density of 16.8 per square mile (6.5/km^{2}). The racial makeup of the town was 96.63% White, 0.21% African American, 0.26% Native American, 0.68% Asian, 0.05% Pacific Islander, 0.05% from other races, and 2.11% from two or more races. Hispanic or Latino of any race were 0.21% of the population.

There were 668 households, out of which 42.8% had children under the age of 18 living with them, 59.1% were married couples living together, 8.2% had a female householder with no husband present, and 26.8% were non-families. 17.8% of all households were made up of individuals, and 4.6% had someone living alone who was 65 years of age or older. The average household size was 2.84 and the average family size was 3.26.

In the town, the age distribution of the population shows 30.6% under the age of 18, 6.9% from 18 to 24, 34.4% from 25 to 44, 22.3% from 45 to 64, and 5.8% who were 65 years of age or older. The median age was 34 years. For every 100 females, there were 96.7 males. For every 100 females age 18 and over, there were 100.8 males.

The median income for a household in the town was $44,559, and the median income for a family was $46,771. Males had a median income of $31,424 versus $23,828 for females. The per capita income for the town was $17,688. About 6.9% of families and 9.8% of the population were below the poverty line, including 12.0% of those under age 18 and 9.3% of those age 65 or over.

== Notable people ==
- Phineas D. Ballou, mayor of Burlington, Vermont, 1868–1870
- Barbara Cochran, Olympic slalom gold medalist (1972)
- Ryan Cochran-Siegle, Olympic Alpine Skiing competitor
- Amos Hoag, member of the Iowa House of Representatives, 1860–1862
- Clement Hurd, children's author
- Edith Thacher Hurd, children's author
- Thacher Hurd, children's author
- David Mason, stonemason
