= Phineas D. Ballou =

American businessman and mayor

Member of the Vermont House of Representatives from Burlington
- In office October 2, 1872 – September 30, 1873
- Preceded by: Walter Carpenter
- Succeeded by: Bradley B. Smalley

3rd Mayor of Burlington
- In office April 7, 1868 – April 3, 1870
- Preceded by: Torrey E. Wales
- Succeeded by: Daniel Chipman Linsley

President of the Burlington Board of Aldermen
- In office April 1, 1867 – April 10, 1868
- Preceded by: Russell S. Taft
- Succeeded by: Calvin Blodgett

Member of the Burlington, Vermont Board of Aldermen from the South Ward
- In office April 2, 1866 – April 10, 1868

Personal details
- Born: March 3, 1823 Starksboro, Vermont
- Died: January 16, 1877 (aged 53) Gayville, Dakota Territory
- Resting place: Oakwood Cemetery, Troy, New York
- Party: Republican
- Spouse(s): Sarah F. Boyington (m. 1844-1847, her death); Lucy Jane Farnsworth (m. 1850-1877, his death)
- Children: 4
- Occupation: Businessman

Phineas D. Ballou (March 3, 1823 – January 16, 1877) was a Vermont businessman and political figure who served as mayor of the city of Burlington from 1868 to 1870.

== Life ==
Phineas Dodge Ballou was born in Starksboro, Vermont on March 3, 1823, a son of Smith Ballou (1786-1854) and Orissa (Bishop) Ballou. He lived and was educated in Burlington and Starksboro, Vermont and Troy and Albany, New York before moving again to Burlington in 1849.

Ballou lived in San Francisco, California for four years during the California Gold Rush, and was a member of the San Francisco Committee of Vigilance that used extralegal means to fight rampant crime and corruption. Ballou returned to Burlington in 1853 and was affiliated with the mercantile firm of David A. Van Namee, whose wife Caroline was the sister of Ballou's wife Lucy. After several years in business with Van Namee, Ballou became a partner in a candy factory and its affiliated candy and cigar store. He subsequently became the owner and operator of a bookstore.

A Republican, he served in local offices including alderman and president of the board of aldermen. Ballou was mayor of Burlington from 1868 to 1870. In 1872, he was elected to represent Burlington in the Vermont House of Representatives.

Business failures during the Panic of 1873 led to his decision to leave his family in Burlington and move to Omaha, Nebraska, where he engaged in several enterprises he hoped would enable him to recover, including a partnership in a brewery. His sons later joined him in Omaha, and in 1876 his partner and he moved their brewery from Omaha to the new and rapidly expanding town of Deadwood, Dakota Territory. Ballou and his partner also intended to search for gold, and Ballou was engaged in this venture when he died.

Ballou died in Gayville, Dakota Territory, about six miles from Deadwood, on January 16, 1877. According to others on the scene, Ballou had inspected a gold mining claim and stayed overnight at a Gayville stagecoach station, intending to travel back to Deadwood the following day. During the night, he went outdoors to relieve himself, mistook the shack covering a mineshaft opening for an outhouse, and accidentally fell about 35 feet. Other individuals at the station heard his cries for help and rescued him from the mine, but Ballou died from his injuries soon afterwards.

At the time of his death, Ballou was wearing a Masonic ring, so he was recognized as a member by Deadwood's Masons. Masons took charge of transporting Ballou's body from Deadwood to Omaha, and then on to Troy. He received Masonic funeral rites at the Troy home of his brother Edgar before being interred at Oakwood Cemetery in Troy.

== Personal life ==
In 1844, Ballou married Sarah F. Boyington, who died in 1847. In 1850, he married Lucy Jane Farnsworth (b. 1829). With his first wife, Ballou was the father of son William, who was born and died in 1847. With his second, his children included Charles Clark Farnsworth, Edgar Phineas, and Franklin Converse.

Ballou was long affiliated with Freemasonry, including the Scottish Rite and Knights Templar, and served in leadership positions at several lodges in Burlington. He attained the 33rd Degree in 1870. Ballou was also active in the Independent Order of Odd Fellows, and served as grand master of the organization in Vermont.

== Sources ==
=== Books ===
- Ballou, Adin (1888). An Elaborate History and Genealogy of the Ballous in America. Providence, RI: E. L. Freeman & Son. pp. 721–722 – via Internet Archive.

=== Magazines ===
- Bigelow, George H.; Underwood, Levi; Nichols, Sayles (1877). "In Memoriam: Phineas Dodge Ballou". Proceedings of the Supreme Council, Ancient and Accepted Scottish Rite, Northern Jurisdiction. Binghamton, NY: Republican Print. pp. 146–151 – via Google Books.

=== Newspapers ===
- "Accidental Death of an Omaha Man at Deadwood". Omaha Daily Bee. 19 January 1877. p. 1. Archived from the original on 4 December 2019 – via Newspapers.com.
