= Amos Hoag =

American politician (1805–1895)

Amos W. Hoag (17 May 1805 – 3 June 1896) was an American politician.

Amos Hoag was born in Starksboro, Vermont, to parents Elihu Hoag and Dorcas Powell on 17 May 1805. He moved to Ward Township, Winneshiek County, Iowa, where he became a farmer. Hoag was married to Persis Hallock from June 1830 to her death in September of the same year. In October 1831, he married a second time, to Emeline Wild Power, with whom he raised 12 children, four of whom were living at the time of his death.

Hoag was elected coroner of Winneshiek County in 1857. Between 1860 and 1862, he was a member of the Iowa House of Representatives, representing District 57 as a Republican. He later moved to Carthage, Missouri, where he died on 3 June 1896.
