= Suicide of Lia Smith =

2025 suicide of transgender college student

Lia Smith
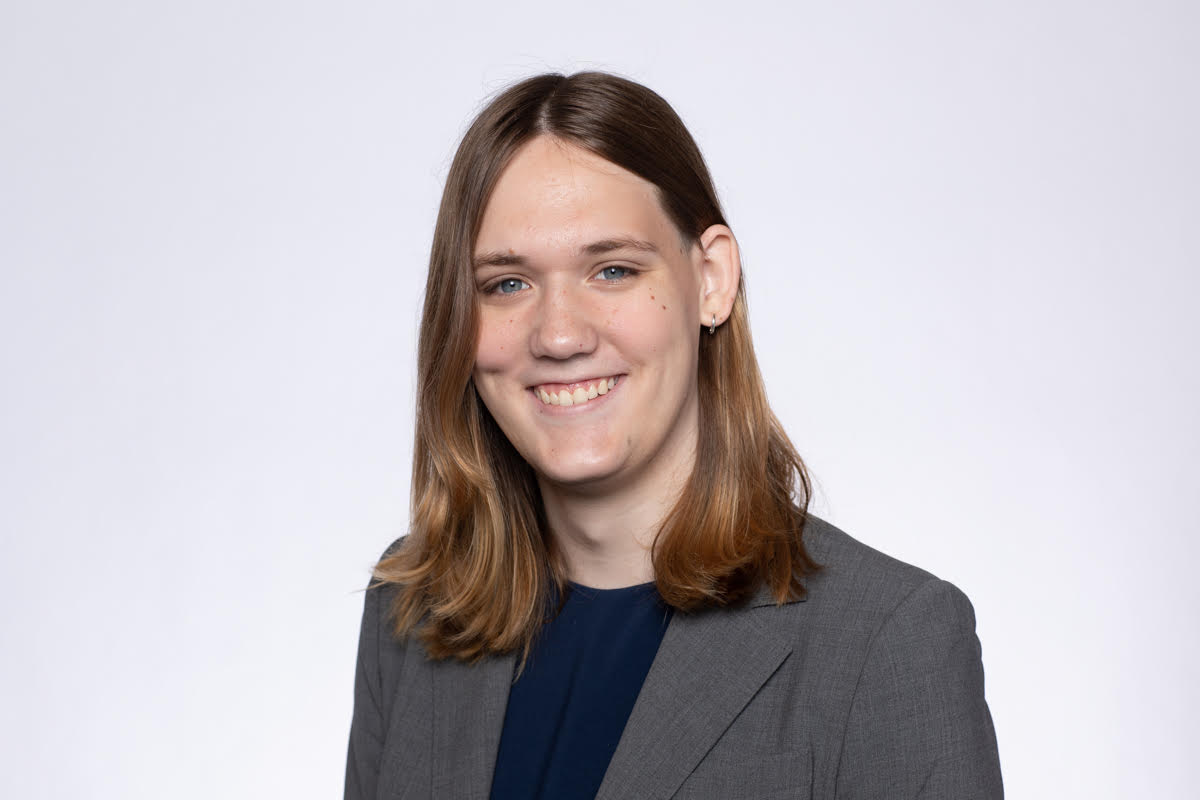
- Smith in 2024
- Born: March 7, 2004; Berkeley, California, U.S.
- Died: October 18, 2025 (aged 21); Cornwall, Vermont, U.S.
- Cause of death: Suicide
- Education: Middlebury College
- Awards: Nor-Cal Diver of the Year (first, ages 10-11); Nor-Cal Diver of the Year (second, ages 14-15); Sean McLarry Fine Arts Scholarship Award at Sacred Heart; Blue-Ribbon Award at Sacred Heart; Rotary Club of Menlo Park Academic Achievement Award; Bronze Presidential Volunteer Service Award

Lia Purcell Smith (March 7, 2004 – October 18, 2025) was an American student at Middlebury College in Middlebury, Vermont, who died by suicide on October 18, 2025, at the age of 21. She was reported missing by her father on October 19, 2025, and her body was found by the Vermont State Police near Middlebury College's organic farm in Cornwall, Vermont, on October 24, 2025. Smith, who was a transgender woman, was a member of the Middlebury Panthers women's swimming and diving team and experienced backlash, doxing, and deadnaming from critics of transgender women athletes.

== Background ==
Smith was born on March 7, 2004, in Berkeley, California, to Gregory C. Smith and Keith E. Purcell, growing up in Woodside, California, and graduating from Sacred Heart Preparatory, a private Catholic school in Atherton. From 2012 to 2023, Smith competed in diving competitions throughout the United States. Among numerous other awards, she was the Nor-Cal Diver of the Year (first place, ages 10-11, and second place, ages 14-15). In addition, Smith received the Sean McLarry Fine Arts Scholarship Award at Sacred Heart in 2021, the Blue-Ribbon Award at Sacred Heart in 2022, and the Rotary Club of Menlo Park Academic Achievement Award in 2022. She volunteered as a teaching assistant at Peninsula Bridge, where she was awarded the Bronze Presidential Volunteer Service Award in 2022. Smith, an openly transgender woman, began her medical and legal gender transition during her senior year of high school.

She attended Middlebury College in Middlebury, Vermont, majoring in computer science and statistics. She was a member of the college's chess, bridge, LGBTQ+, and Japanese clubs. She was set to graduate from college in 2026.

Smith was a diver on the Middlebury Panthers women's swimming and diving team as a freshman during the 2022–2023 season. She was one of her team's top performers, placing fifth overall off the 3-meter board during her rookie debut. She stopped competing after her freshman year, citing difficulties as a transgender student athlete, but continued to train with the team from time to time thereafter. In February of 2025, she was publicly doxed by the website and X account called "HeCheated," which documents transgender women winning competitions designated for women in athletics. The site reported Smith's diving history while revealing Smith's birth name. The website went on to post Smith's photo and called her and other trans women athletes "cheaters". The backlash and online harassment Smith and Middlebury received from critics of transgender athletes led the college to remove Smith's biography from its athletics website.

Following President Donald Trump's January 2025 issuance of various executive orders restricting transgender rights, Smith spoke at a protest forum titled Trans Healthcare is NOT a Debate! in February 2025, stating that it was "really hard going in a locker room where you're not welcome, and there's really not a clear space that I should be going to" and that "we're [transgender people] not trying to get into women's spaces to be perverts.. we're just being ourselves. We don't mean any harm to anyone". She spoke up about having to undergo quarterly hormone checks to be able to compete.

== Death ==
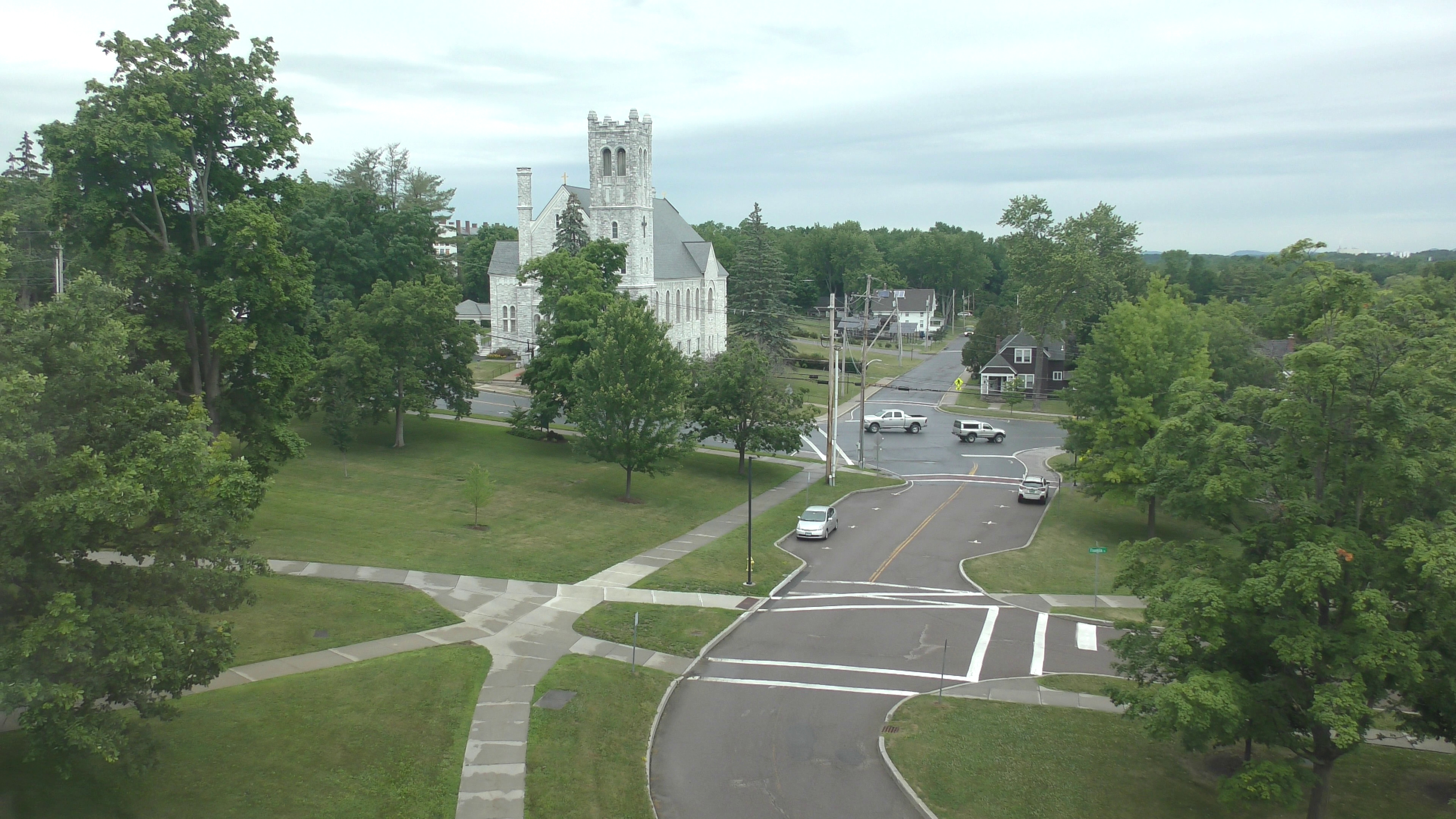
Middlebury College in Vermont, where Smith was enrolled

Smith was last seen on the campus of Middlebury College on October 17, 2025. Her father reported her missing to the Middlebury Police Department on October 19, 2025. On October 23, 2025, an unidentified body was found in Cornwall, Vermont near The Knoll, Middlebury College's organic farm. Vermont State Police identified the body as Smith's on October 24, 2025. The Vermont Chief Medical Examiner's Offices determined the death was a suicide.

== Aftermath and reactions ==
Middlebury College president Ian Baucom released a statement following Smith's death, referring to her as "an articulate advocate of transgender rights". He offered condolences to the family and called Smith's death "a profound loss". Congresswoman Becca Balint (D-VT) issued a press release on October 27, 2025, mourning Smith's death. Opinion-editorial articles were published by the transgender rights activist journalists Katelyn Burns and Erin Reed that blamed anti-transgender policies for Smith's death.

Memorial services for Smith took place on November 2, 2025, at the Harman Assembly Hall at Sacred Heart Preparatory in Atherton, California, and on November 10, 2025, at the Wilson Hall on the Middlebury Campus in Vermont.

== See also ==
- List of suicides of LGBTQ people
- List of transgender people
- Persecution of transgender people under the second Trump administration
- Suicide among LGBTQ people
- Transgender health care § Mental health
- Transgender people in sports
