= Charles Linsley =

American lawyer

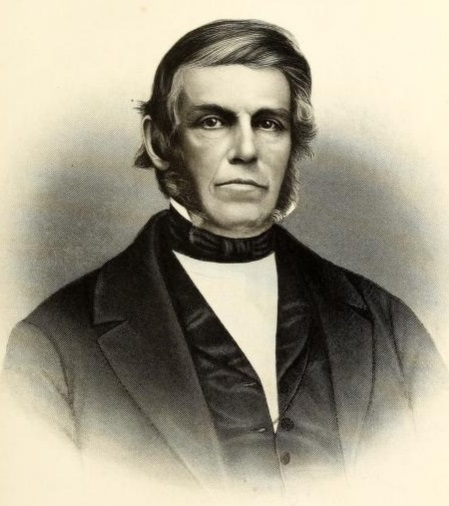
- From 1886's History of Addison County, Vermont

U.S. Collector of Customs for the District of Vermont
- In office 1860–1861
- Preceded by: Isaac B. Bowdish
- Succeeded by: William Clapp

United States Attorney for the District of Vermont
- In office 1845–1849
- Preceded by: Charles Davis
- Succeeded by: Abel Underwood

Member of the Vermont House of Representatives from Rutland
- In office 1858–1859
- Preceded by: William F. Barnes
- Succeeded by: Horace Allen

Vermont Railroad Commissioner
- In office 1855–1857
- Preceded by: None (position created)
- Succeeded by: George Perkins Marsh

Personal details
- Born: August 29, 1795; Cornwall, Vermont
- Died: November 3, 1863 (aged 68); Middlebury, Vermont
- Resting place: Middlebury Cemetery Middlebury, Vermont
- Political party: Democratic (until 1862); Republican (from 1862)
- Spouse(s): Sarah Chipman, m. 1827-1841 (her death); Emmeline Wells, m. 1841-1863 (his death)
- Relations: Daniel Chipman (father-in-law); Joel H. Linsley (brother)
- Children: 17 (including Daniel Chipman Linsley)
- Profession: Attorney

Charles Linsley (August 29, 1795 – November 3, 1863) was a Vermont lawyer and politician. The son-in-law of Daniel Chipman, he was notable for his service as United States Attorney for the District of Vermont (1845-1849), member of the Vermont House of Representatives (1858-1859), and U.S. Collector of Customs for Vermont (1860-1861).

== Early life ==
Charles Linsley was born in Cornwall, Vermont on August 29, 1795. He was the son of American Revolution veteran Judge Joel Linsley and Levina (Gilbert) Linsley, and he was raised and educated in Addison County. Initially trained for a mercantile career, he decided to become an attorney and studied law with his father and Daniel Chipman in Middlebury, afterwards continuing his studies under Stephen Royce in St. Albans. He was admitted to the bar in 1823, and established a successful practice in Middlebury.

== Career ==
In addition to practicing law, Linsley was active in business, politics and government. He served in several local offices, including justice of the peace and commissioner of jail delivery. (The commissioners of jail delivery were responsible for keeping track of sentences and releasing prisoners at their completion. They also ensured that individuals on parole or probation complied with the terms of their sentences.) A Democrat, he campaigned for Congress as opposition to slavery was becoming the dominant issue in Vermont politics, which enabled the rise of first the Anti-Masonic Party, then the Whigs, and then the Republicans. Linsley was the Democratic nominee for the U.S. House of Representatives from Vermont's 2nd District in 1833, 1838, and 1840, and lost each time to incumbent William Slade.

from 1845 to 1849, Linsley served as United States Attorney for the District of Vermont, succeeding Charles Davis and preceding Abel Underwood. He served for several years as counsel and board of directors member for the Rutland and Burlington Railroad. When the state legislature created the position of state railroad commissioner in 1855 to regulate railway construction, maintenance and operations, Linsley was the first person appointed to the position, and he served until 1857, when he was succeeded by George Perkins Marsh. Linsley's other business interests included serving as a director of the Champlain and Connecticut River Railroad, the Middlebury Savings Bank, and the Middlebury Hotel Company.

In 1856, Linsley moved to Rutland to practice law in partnership with John Prout, and in 1858 he served as Rutland's member of the Vermont House of Representatives. From 1860 to 1861 he served as the U.S. Collector of Customs for Vermont. Linsley returned to Middlebury in 1862. During the American Civil War, he was initially a pro-Union Democrat and a strong opponent of secession, which led him to join the Republican Party in 1862.

== Honors ==
In 1835, Linsley received the honorary degree of Master of Arts from Middlebury College.

== Death and burial ==
During the final two years of his life, Linsley suffered from ill health. He died in Middlebury on November 3, 1863 and was buried at Middlebury Cemetery in Middlebury.

== Family ==
In 1827, Linsley married Sarah Chipman (1806-1841), the daughter of Daniel Chipman. They were the parents of Daniel (1827-1889), Sarah (1828-1854), Charles (1831-1853), George (1833-1889), Susan (1835-1835), Edward (1837-1841), Eliza (1838-1861), and Emma (1840-1854).

Linsley married Emmeline Wells in 1841. Their children included David (1842-1842), Mary (b. 1844), Emmeline (1845-1858), Joel (1847-1899), John Gilbert (1849-1851), William (1851-1910), Hellena (1854-1857), Julius Gilbert (1856-1930), and Richard (1859-1860).

Charles Linsley's siblings included Joel H. Linsley, a prominent clergyman who served as president of Marietta College.

== Sources ==
=== Internet ===
- Achen, Christopher H. (May 26, 2011). "Slavery or Sheep? The Antebellum Realignment in Vermont 1840-1860" (PDF). Center for the Study of Democratic Politics. Princeton, NJ: Princeton University.
- Ellingson, Barbara (1997). "Biographical Sketch, Charles Linsley" (PDF). Charles and Emmeline Linsley Papers, 1827-1892. Montpelier, VT: Vermont Historical Society.
- "Past Elections: Charles Linsley (D)". Vermont Elections Database. Montpelier, VT: Vermont Secretary of State.

=== Books ===
- Boyce, Thomas E. (1890). Catalogue of the Officers and Alumni of Middlebury College. Middlebury, VT: The register Company.
- Carleton, Hiram (1903). Genealogical and Family History of the State of Vermont. Vol. 1. New York, NY: Lewis Historical Publishing Company. ISBN 9780806347943.
- Smith, H. P.; Rann, W. S. (1886). History of Rutland County, Vermont. Syracuse, NY: D. Mason & Co.
- Vermont State Legislature (1828). Journal of the General Assembly of the State of Vermont (1828). Woodstock, VT: Rufus Colton.
- Vermont State Legislature (1830). Journal of the General Assembly of the State of Vermont (1830). Woodstock, VT: Rufus Colton.
- Vermont State Legislature (1833). Acts and Resolves Passed by the General Assembly of the State of Vermont (1833). Montpelier, VT: Knapp & Jewett.
- Vermont State Legislature (1851). Acts and Resolves Passed by the General Assembly of the State of Vermont (1851). Montpelier, VT: E. P. Walton & Son.

=== Newspapers ===
- "Addison County Right on the Record". Green Mountain Freeman. Montpelier, VT. June 26, 1862 – via Newspapers.com.
