= David Mason (mason) =

American stonemason (1931–2020)

David James "Stoney" Mason (April 28, 1931 – March 26, 2020) was a master stone-wall mason from Starksboro, Vermont. He was born in the village of Starksboro and lived his whole life there. His dry stone stacking technique has been rarely used in the last two centuries. Dry stone stacking means placing each stone in direct contact with another without the use of mortar or any other adhesive agent. He has been given several awards, been covered by Vermont Life Magazine and other publications and had the honor of constructing a stone wall on the Washington, D.C. Mall as part of the 2001 Folklife Festival. David lived in the village of Starksboro with his wife Bette. David's son Rick is also a stone-wall mason. David died on March 26, 2020. Bette died on February 18, 2021.

"Stoney" as he was referred to by those who knew (of) him was known in his later years for always loving to sit outside on the front lawn of his Starksboro home and watch the school buses leave Robinson Elementary School. He constructed several stone walls around Starksboro itself, including two at Robinson Elementary, one of which notably had a chair built into it.
