= Beaumelle Sturtevant-Peet =

American social reformer

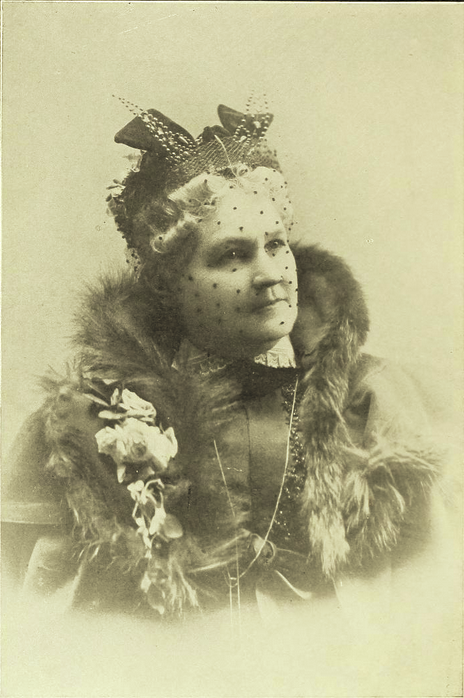
- Sturtevant-Peet in 1911
- Born: April 27, 1840; Cornwall, Vermont
- Died: January 21, 1921 (aged 80); Piedmont, California
- Education: California State Normal School
- Occupation: Activist
- Known for: test
- Spouse: Ethan Allen Sturtevant (m. 1866–1878) Edward Warren Peet (m. 1883–1908)
- Children: 3

Beaumelle Sturtevant-Peet (née, Rockwell; after first marriage, Sturtevant; after second marriage, Sturtevant-Peet; April 27, 1840 – January 23, 1921) was an American social reformer active in the temperance and women's suffrage movements, as well as in philanthropic work. She was born with a social reformer heritage; her grandfather would not eat of cane sugar or wear cotton goods, because they were made by slave labor. For 17 years, she served as president of the Woman's Christian Temperance Union (W.C.T.U.) of California. Her fellow members spoke of Sturtevant-Peet as having one of the finest trained and legal minds in the organization.

== Early life and education ==
Beaumelle Rockwell was born in Cornwall, Vermont, April 27, 1840. Her parents were Sylvester Bird (1813-1884) and Elizabeth (Delong) Rockwell (1818-1881). Beaumelle had two younger sisters, Frances and Alice.

She was educated in her hometown, and at a boarding school in Burlington, Vermont. She also attended the State Normal School at San Jose, California.

== Career ==
She married first, at Middlebury, Vermont, June 12, 1866, Ethan Allen Sturtevant (1839-1878), a lawyer. They had three children: Fannie Beaumelle (1868-1869), Mary Beaumelle (1872-1957), and Robert Taft (1876-1913).

After the Women's Crusade of Ohio, a meeting of women was called at Montpelier, the capital of Vermont, to discuss the situation. The pastors of the city took the initiative and appointed delegates from their respective churches. When Mrs. Sturtevant heard of her appointment, she shrank back, but at her pastor's request, consented to serve, if her mother would go with her. Her mother did go, and that day, the W.C.T.U. of Vermont was organized, with Mrs. Sturtevant as its first secretary. Mr. Sturtevant was proud to have his wife so appreciated, and when an organizer was needed, she was elected to that office, and in that capacity, traveled the mountains and valleys of her native State for years, making her impress upon the sentiment of the State and laying foundations for the work of the Woman's Christian Temperance Union (WCTU). Even after being widowed, she continued in both roles.

As children, before she left for boarding school and his family moved West, she had been friends with Edward Warren Peet (1834-1908). They met again after both were widowed, each with two children to raise. They married in Middlebury, Vermont, March 21, 1883, and shortly thereafter, Sturtevant-Peet came to California with her new husband.

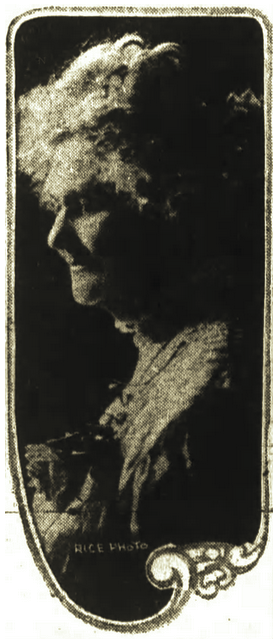
(1921)

Sturtevant arrived in California just as the state WCTU's Legislative Department was created. She became its first Superintendent, and was especially prominent in looking after legislation desired by the union. She became well known as a lobbyist for measures regarding public morals, at Sacramento. Among the other benefits Sturtevant-Peet gave to the women of the State was the raising of the age of consent to 18 years. For six years, she served as president of the Alameda County, California WCTU After succeeding from the State vice-presidency to the presidency in the middle of a term, she served as president of the California WCTU for 17 years, making a record of bringing together the 5,000 members. She also held the position of State Superintendent, Lecture Bureau. During her presidency, she was one of the most prominent WCTU workers in the U.S. Upon retirement from active leadership in the organization, she was elected its honorary president.

The California WCTU honored Sturtevant-Peet by making her birthday a Red Letter Day, and annually celebrating it by doing something for the advancement of woman suffrage, a cause to which she was devoted, or for "Scientific Instruction" in schools. She was a close friend of the pivotal suffragist, Susan B. Anthony.

Sturtevant-Peet's other activities included serving as the vice-president and parliamentarian of the Child's Welfare League of Oakland, California, as well as being a member of the Civic Center League and the Oakland Club. In religion, she was a Congregationalist. In politics, she was a Progressive Republican.

== Death ==
In February 1920, she was seriously injured in a car accident, when her sister, Miss Alice Rockwell, visiting from the East, was instantly killed. As Sturtevant-Peet was slowly regaining her strength, she fell in her home. She did not fully recover from the second accident. Beaumelle Sturtevant-Peet died on January 23, 1921, at the age of 80, at Fabiola Hospital in Piedmont area of Oakland, California following an illness of nine weeks' duration.
