= Charles G. Lewis =

American politician (1823–1917)

Charles Gleason Lewis (December 18, 1823 – March 7, 1917) was a member of the Wisconsin State Assembly in 1879. Other positions he held include Town Treasurer and Town Clerk of Sun Prairie (town), Wisconsin. He was a Republican.

Lewis was born on December 18, 1823, in Cornwall, Vermont. He relocated to Wisconsin in the 1840s and lived in Madison for 36 years. He married Eliza M. Bush (1844–1916) in 1868, and they moved to Sparta, Wisconsin in 1880, where he died in 1917.
