= Cornwall, Vermont =

- Town
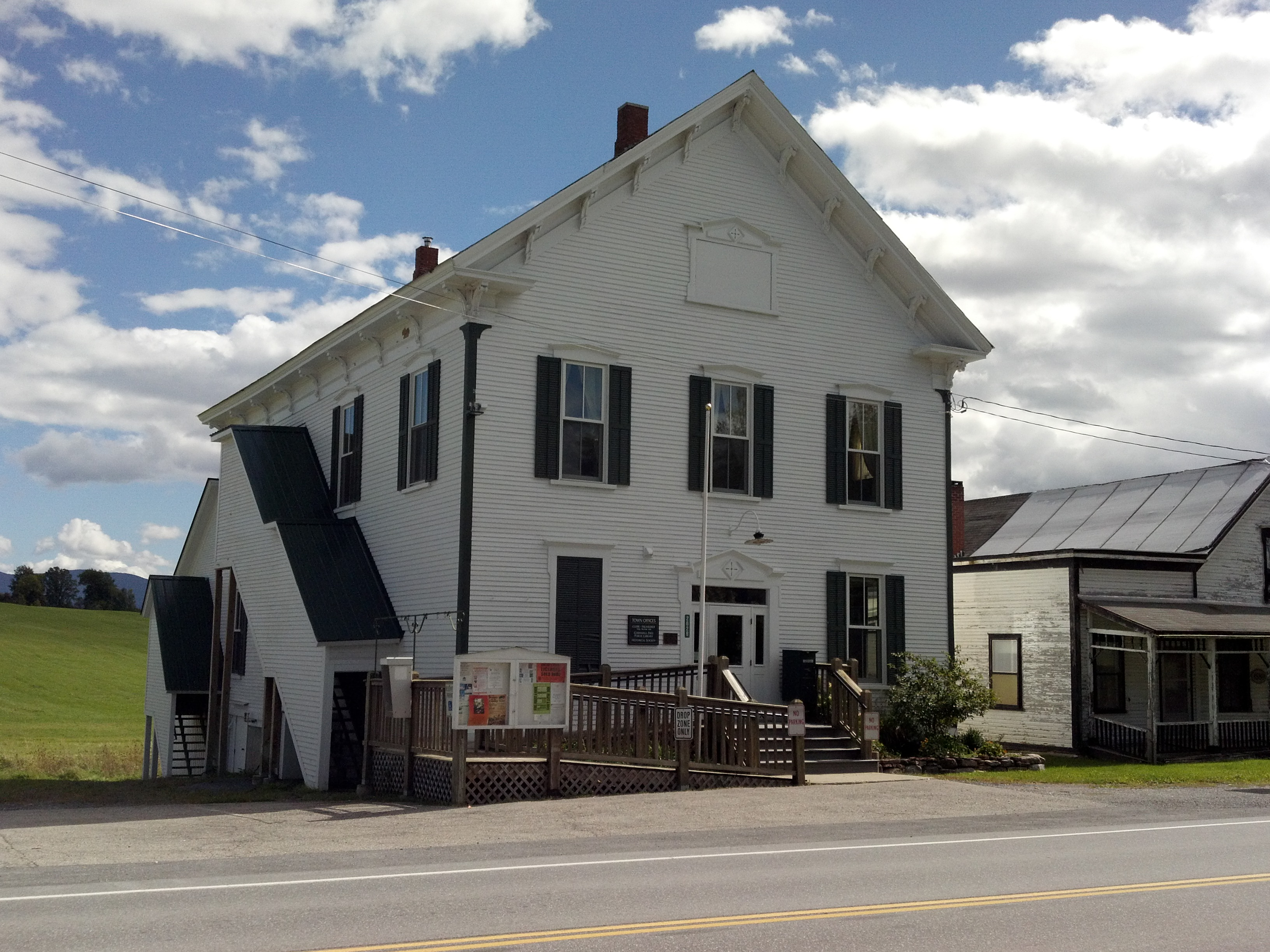
- Cornwall Town Hall

- Seal

- Location in Addison County and the state of Vermont
- Coordinates: 43°59′10″N 73°14′05″W
- Country: United States
- State: Vermont
- County: Addison
- Communities: Cornwall; West Cornwall

Area
  - Total: 28.6 sq mi (74.1 km^{2})
  - Land: 28.5 sq mi (73.7 km^{2})
  - Water: 0.15 sq mi (0.4 km^{2})
- Elevation: 335 ft (102 m)

Population (2020)
  - Total: 1,207
  - Density: 42/sq mi (16.4/km^{2})
- Time zone: UTC-5 (Eastern (EST))
  - Summer (DST): UTC-4 (EDT)
- ZIP code: 05753
- Area code: 802
- FIPS code: 50-16000
- GNIS feature ID: 1462076
- Website: www.cornwallvt.gov

Cornwall is a town in Addison County, Vermont, United States. It was founded November 3, 1761. The population was 1,207 at the 2020 census.

== Geography ==
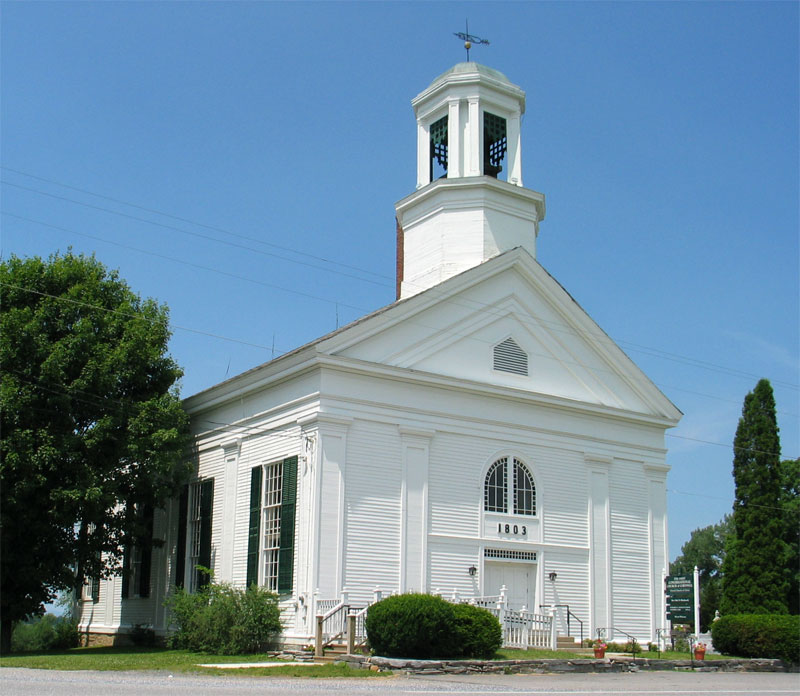
Cornwall Congregational Church

Cornwall is located in south-central Addison County, in the Champlain Valley. It is bordered by the town of Middlebury (the county seat) to the northeast, Salisbury to the southeast, Whiting to the south, Shoreham to the southwest, Bridport to the west, and Weybridge to the north. Otter Creek forms the town border with Salisbury. Vermont Route 30, also known as the "Seth Warner Memorial Highway" and named for notable Vermonter Seth Warner, passes north–south through Cornwall, while Vermont Route 125 passes east–west through the northern part of the town. Vermont Route 74 leads southwest from the center of town, towards the Ticonderoga–Larrabees Point Ferry across Lake Champlain.

According to the United States Census Bureau, the town of Cornwall has a total area of 28.6 square miles (74.1 km^{2}), of which 28.5 square miles (73.7 km^{2}) is land and 0.15 square miles (0.4 km^{2}), or 0.57%, is water.

=== Climate ===
Climate data for Cornwall, Vermont (1991–2020 normals, extremes 1894–1996, 1999–present)
Month	Jan	Feb	Mar	Apr	May	Jun	Jul	Aug	Sep	Oct	Nov	Dec	Year
Record high °F (°C)	64 (18)	66 (19)	82 (28)	91 (33)	95 (35)	99 (37)	102 (39)	104 (40)	96 (36)	88 (31)	77 (25)	67 (19)	104 (40)
Mean daily maximum °F (°C)	27.1 (−2.7)	30.3 (−0.9)	39.5 (4.2)	53.6 (12.0)	67.0 (19.4)	75.5 (24.2)	80.4 (26.9)	78.6 (25.9)	71.3 (21.8)	57.4 (14.1)	44.3 (6.8)	33.0 (0.6)	54.8 (12.7)
Daily mean °F (°C)	18.2 (−7.7)	20.3 (−6.5)	29.8 (−1.2)	43.2 (6.2)	56.0 (13.3)	65.0 (18.3)	70.0 (21.1)	67.8 (19.9)	60.2 (15.7)	47.7 (8.7)	36.4 (2.4)	25.3 (−3.7)	45.0 (7.2)
Mean daily minimum °F (°C)	9.2 (−12.7)	10.3 (−12.1)	20.1 (−6.6)	32.7 (0.4)	45.0 (7.2)	54.5 (12.5)	59.6 (15.3)	57.0 (13.9)	49.1 (9.5)	38.0 (3.3)	28.4 (−2.0)	17.5 (−8.1)	35.1 (1.7)
Record low °F (°C)	−30 (−34)	−31 (−35)	−20 (−29)	2 (−17)	20 (−7)	31 (−1)	39 (4)	32 (0)	22 (−6)	13 (−11)	−5 (−21)	−32 (−36)	−32 (−36)
Average precipitation inches (mm)	2.55 (65)	2.07 (53)	2.42 (61)	3.35 (85)	3.37 (86)	4.21 (107)	4.09 (104)	3.53 (90)	3.25 (83)	3.96 (101)	2.85 (72)	3.02 (77)	38.67 (982)
Average snowfall inches (cm)	13.3 (34)	13.3 (34)	11.9 (30)	2.6 (6.6)	0.0 (0.0)	0.0 (0.0)	0.0 (0.0)	0.0 (0.0)	0.0 (0.0)	0.3 (0.76)	3.8 (9.7)	13.4 (34)	58.6 (149)
Average precipitation days (≥ 0.01 in)	11.1	9.2	8.5	11.0	11.1	12.3	11.4	10.8	8.7	12.4	9.9	12.4	128.8
Average snowy days (≥ 0.1 in)	7.6	7.1	3.9	1.2	0.0	0.0	0.0	0.0	0.0	0.1	1.5	6.7	28.1
Source: NOAA

== Landmarks ==
Cornwall is home to a monument of fallen soldiers from several wars. The most recent inscription is of a soldier who was killed on the Verdun Front on November 10, 1918, a day before the armistice.

== Demographics ==
Historical population
Census	Pop.	Note	%±
1790	826		—
1800	1,163		40.8%
1810	1,279		10.0%
1820	1,120		−12.4%
1830	1,264		12.9%
1840	1,163		−8.0%
1850	1,155		−0.7%
1860	977		−15.4%
1870	969		−0.8%
1880	1,070		10.4%
1890	927		−13.4%
1900	850		−8.3%
1910	789		−7.2%
1920	782		−0.9%
1930	640		−18.2%
1940	670		4.7%
1950	728		8.7%
1960	756		3.8%
1970	900		19.0%
1980	993		10.3%
1990	1,101		10.9%
2000	1,136		3.2%
2010	1,185		4.3%
2020	1,207		1.9%
U.S. Decennial Census

As of the census of 2000, there were 1,136 people, 427 households, and 322 families residing in the town. The population density was 39.7 people per square mile (15.3/km^{2}). There were 464 housing units at an average density of 16.2 per square mile (6.3/km^{2}). The racial makeup of the town was 98.24% White, 0.09% African American, 0.62% Asian, 0.26% from other races, and 0.79% from two or more races. Hispanic or Latino of any race were 0.44% of the population.

There were 427 households, out of which 34.0% had children under the age of 18 living with them, 65.6% were married couples living together, 6.6% had a female householder with no husband present, and 24.4% were non-families. 18.3% of all households were made up of individuals, and 7.7% had someone living alone who was 65 years of age or older. The average household size was 2.66 and the average family size was 3.03.

In the town, the age distribution of the population shows 25.6% under the age of 18, 7.8% from 18 to 24, 23.1% from 25 to 44, 30.7% from 45 to 64, and 12.8% who were 65 years of age or older. The median age was 41 years. For every 100 females, there were 101.8 males. For every 100 females age 18 and over, there were 95.2 males.

The median income for a household in the town was $52,692, and the median income for a family was $59,792. Males had a median income of $36,563 versus $23,913 for females. The per capita income for the town was $26,902. About 3.4% of families and 5.6% of the population were below the poverty line, including 2.4% of those under age 18 and 5.1% of those age 65 or over.

=== 2020 census ===
Cornwall Town racial composition
Race	Num.	Perc.
White (non-Hispanic)	1,114	92.31%
Black or African American (non-Hispanic)	6	0.50%
Native American	1	0.17%
Asian	10	0.83%
Pacific Islander	0	0
Other/Mixed	48	3.98%
Hispanic or Latino	28	2.32%

== Education ==
Cornwall public school is the kindergarten-fifth grade Bingham Memorial School.

Middle school students attend Middlebury Union Middle School (MUMS) and high school students who live in Cornwall attend Middlebury Union High School (MUHS) in Middlebury, Vermont.

== Notable people ==
- Chauncey Abbott (1815–1872), Wisconsin politician
- Luther Loren Baxter (1832–1915), Minnesota politician, lawyer, and judge
- Marvin Dana (1867–1926), author and magazine editor
- Solomon Foot (1802–1866), lawyer, US congressman and senator
- Abram W. Foote (1862–1941), 51st lieutenant governor of Vermont
- Charles G. Lewis, Wisconsin assemblyman
- Charles Linsley, Vermont attorney and politician
- Joel H. Linsley (1790–1868), Congregational minister and first president of Marietta College
- Sheldon Peck (1797-1868), folk artist, conductor, and social activist
- Luke Reynolds (born 1979), artist, musician, member since 2010 of rock band Guster
- Lia Smith (2004–2025), Middlebury college athlete who died by suicide in Cornwall
- Beaumelle Sturtevant-Peet (1840-1921), president, California Woman's Christian Temperance Union
- Enoch Cobb Wines (1806–1879), Congregational minister and penologist
