= Bellows Falls Tunnel =

Railroad tunnel in Vermont

Coordinates: 43.133662°N 72.443729°W

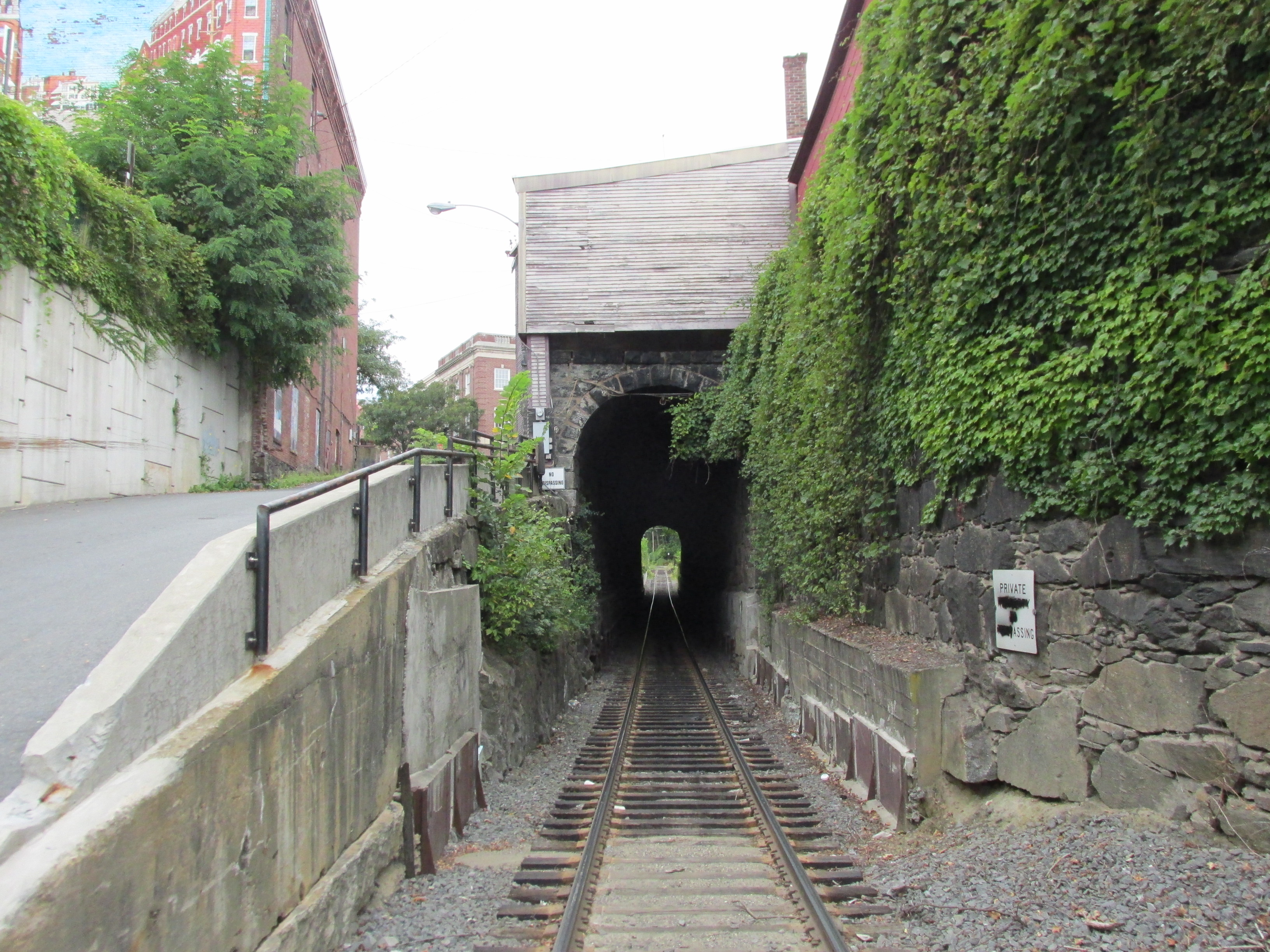
South Portal of the Bellows Falls Rail Tunnel.

The Bellows Falls Tunnel is a railroad tunnel located in center of the Village of Bellows Falls within the Town of Rockingham, Vermont, adjacent to the Connecticut River, and is currently owned and operated by the New England Central Railroad (NECR). The Vermont Valley Railroad originally constructed the tunnel in 1851. Partially cut through solid rock, the tunnel was built with rough-cut stone blocks, where each portal was decorated with radiating voussoirs around their horseshoe shaped arches. The stone blocks average about 18 inches deep as observed at the tunnel portals. Record information available from the NECR would indicate that a separate support system exists above the masonry tunnel supporting the hotel building to the north of the Bridge Street roadway which is also directly above, and crosses perpendicular (east/west) to the tunnel below.

The tunnel runs in a north/south direction and is located at Milepost 144.56 of the NECR connecting the Canadian National (CN) line in Canada to CSX and other rail lines in Massachusetts.

== Tunnel Dimensions ==
The tunnel is 278 feet long, extending from the north side of Mill Street to within 157 feet of the Bellows Falls Canal Bridge. As of August 2007 the vertical clearance of the tunnel was (20 ft. 8 in.). There is a slight down grade from south to north. There is a curve to the west (looking south), just south of the tunnel and its grade crossing. The track is tangent from the grade crossing through the tunnel and over the half-through girder bridge. To the northwest of the tunnel, there is a crib wall. Drainage in the area is generally poor, with a few inches of standing water at the south end of the tunnel during wet weather. Prior to 2007, according to the Clearance Measurement Vehicle (CMV) clearance plate, the crest of the tunnel arch was (20 ft. 6 in.) above the top of rail. However, the minimum vertical clearance, due to the arch curvature was really (18 ft. 2 in.) at (4 ft. 9 in.) from the centerline of track which is (9 ft. 6 in.) wide.

== Tunnel Modifications ==
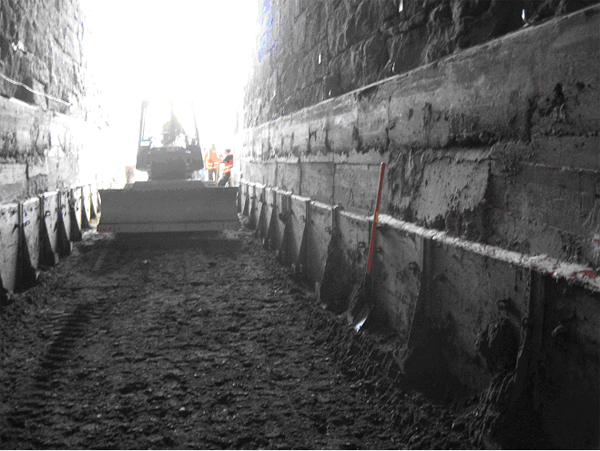
Interior view of tunnel excavation lowering the trackage, 2007.

Over its lifespan, the tunnel floor had been lowered three times; once in 1897, again in 1977 (by the Boston & Maine Railroad), and most recently in 2007 (as a joint venture between the Vermont Agency of Transportation, FHWA, and NECR with consultants; Parson Brinckerhoff Engineering & ECI Rail Constructors, Inc.) in order to accommodate increased car and locomotive heights at their respective periods of time.

The 1977 clearance improvement project lowered the tracks through the tunnel and created a new vertical profile from north of the bridge over the canal to the south of the existing tunnel. The 1977 vertical profile required the modification of the floor system for the half-through girder bridge over the canal. Negotiations with the Green Mountain Power Company at the time of the lowering resulted in an agreement to set the bridge on a modified grade over the canal that improved the vertical profile through the tunnel without reducing the bridge structure's clearance above the canal's high water elevation. The trackage was lowered in the tunnel approximately two feet by underpinning the existing tunnel walls. This project resulted in a track profile through the tunnel that was the lowest resulting profile achievable given the physical constraints of the area and is considered to be substandard for the railroad industry.

Until the 2007 project, the tunnel had been a choke point for the movement of modern autoracks and double stack containers into and out of Vermont. The 2007 project lowered the trackage to accommodate "Modified double stack containers" through the tunnel, utilizing a modified design build management process to expedite the tunnel work in an efficient, cost effective, and timely manner. On Saturday, August 18 at 4:00 a.m., rail traffic on the eastern side of Vermont was shut down for three days so that the lowering of the track could occur. Crews worked 24 hours each day until the work was completed. A test train ran over the track on Monday August 20. Approximately 750 cubic yards of material was excavated from within the tunnel. Trackage was dropped about 3 feet while the lower tunnel foundation was installed with steel walls and struts in order to enable future track lowering (for full double stack clearance) without necessity of additional foundation underpinning (after the railroad adjusts the elevation of their Canal Bridge).

Upon completion of the 2007 project, NECR was estimated to experience approximately 5,000 additional freight cars per year operating over their mainline in Vermont.
