= Joel H. Linsley =

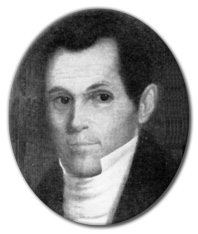
Joel Linsley

Joel Harvey Linsley (1790–1868) was a notable Congregational minister and president of Marietta College in Ohio.

The Rev. Dr. Joel Harvey Linsley was born in 1790 in Cornwall, Vermont to Levina Gilbert and Joel Linsley, who subsequently became a New York Judge. Joel Linsley graduated from Middlebury College and then studied and practiced law during the first seven years of his professional life. After resuming his religious studies, Linsley was ordained and served as a pastor of South Congregational Church in Connecticut in 1824. He then served as pastor of Park Street Church in Boston from 1832 to 1835. In 1835 the trustees of Marietta College recruited Linsley to serve as the college's first president. By the end of 1846, Linsley accepted a pastorship of the Second Congregational Church in Greenwich, Connecticut, where he served until his death in 1868.

Among Linsley's siblings was Charles Linsley, a prominent Vermont attorney and politician.
