= Daniel Chipman =

American politician (1765-1850)

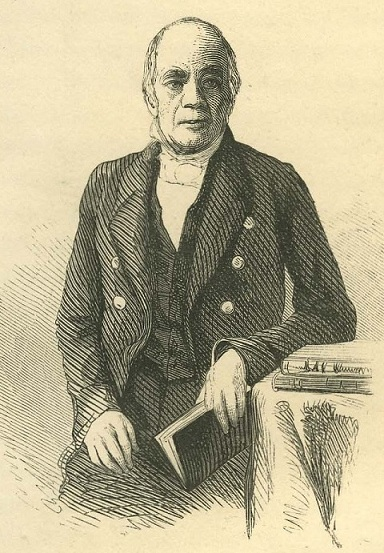

Member of the United States House of Representatives from Vermont's 1st district
- In office March 4, 1815 – May 5, 1816
- Preceded by: William Czar Bradley
- Succeeded by: Orsamus Cook Merrill

Member of the Vermont House of Representatives
- In office 1798–1808; 1812–1814; 1818; 1821

Personal details
- Born: October 22, 1765 Salisbury, Connecticut Colony, British America
- Died: April 23, 1850 (aged 84) Ripton, Vermont, U.S.
- Party: Federalist Party (United States)
- Spouse: Eleutheria Hedge Chipman
- Children: Austin Chipman, Sarah White Chipman, Susan Hedge Chipman and Mary Chipman
- Profession: Politician, Lawyer, Professor

Daniel Chipman (October 22, 1765 – April 23, 1850) was an American politician. He was a United States representative from Vermont.

== Biography ==
Chipman was born in Salisbury in the Connecticut Colony to Samuel and Hannah Austin Chipman. He graduated from Dartmouth College in 1788. He studied law and was admitted to the bar. He began the practice of law in Rutland, Vermont, and practiced law there from 1790 until 1794. Chipman was a member of the state constitutional conventions in 1793, 1814, 1836, 1843, and 1850. He moved to Middlebury, Vermont, in 1794. Among the law students who became attorneys after studying in Chipman's office was Charles Davis, who later served on the Vermont Supreme Court.

Chipman served as a member of the Vermont House of Representatives from 1798 to 1808, 1812 to 1814, 1818, and 1821. He was named a Charter Trustee of Middlebury College and served in that position until his resignation in 1844. He served as Speaker of the Vermont House of Representatives during the sessions of 1813 and 1814. From 1806 until 1818 he was a professor of law at Middlebury College. In 1848 he received an honorary LL.D. from Middlebury College. He was a member of the Governor’s council in 1808. In 1812 he was elected a Fellow of the American Academy of Arts and Sciences.

Chipman was elected as a Federalist Party candidate to the Fourteenth United States Congress, serving from March 4, 1815, until his resignation on May 5, 1816. This was his sixth campaign for Congress; he previously ran in 1796, 1798, 1800, 1802, and 1812. In 1824 he was appointed reporter of the superior court. He moved to Ripton, Vermont, in 1828 and continued the practice of law, and engaged in literary pursuits.

== Family life ==
Chipman married Eleutheria Hedge Chipman in 1796. They had four children together, including Mary Chipman whose daughter Sarah was the wife of Charles Linsley.

Chipman wrote a biography of his brother Nathaniel Chipman, a United States senator from Vermont, the first federal judge in Vermont, and, during the latter part of Vermont's years as an independent country, Chief Justice of Vermont. His brother Lemuel Chipman served in the New York State Assembly and the New York State Senate.

== Death and legacy ==
Chipman died on April 23, 1850, in Ripton, Vermont. He is interred at West Cemetery in Middlebury, Vermont.

Chipman Hill in Middlebury is named for him.

== Published works ==
- “Life of Nathaniel Chipman”
- “Memoirs of Thomas Chittenden, First Governor of Vermont”
- "Essay of Law of Contracts"
- "Memoirs of Col. Seth Warner"

Political offices
Preceded by Dudley Chase	Speaker of the Vermont House of Representatives; 1813–1815	Succeeded by William A. Griswold
U.S. House of Representatives
Preceded by William C. Bradley	Member of the U.S. House of Representatives from Vermont's at-large congressional district 1815–1816	Succeeded by Orsamus C. Merrill
