= New York and Boston Rapid Transit Company =

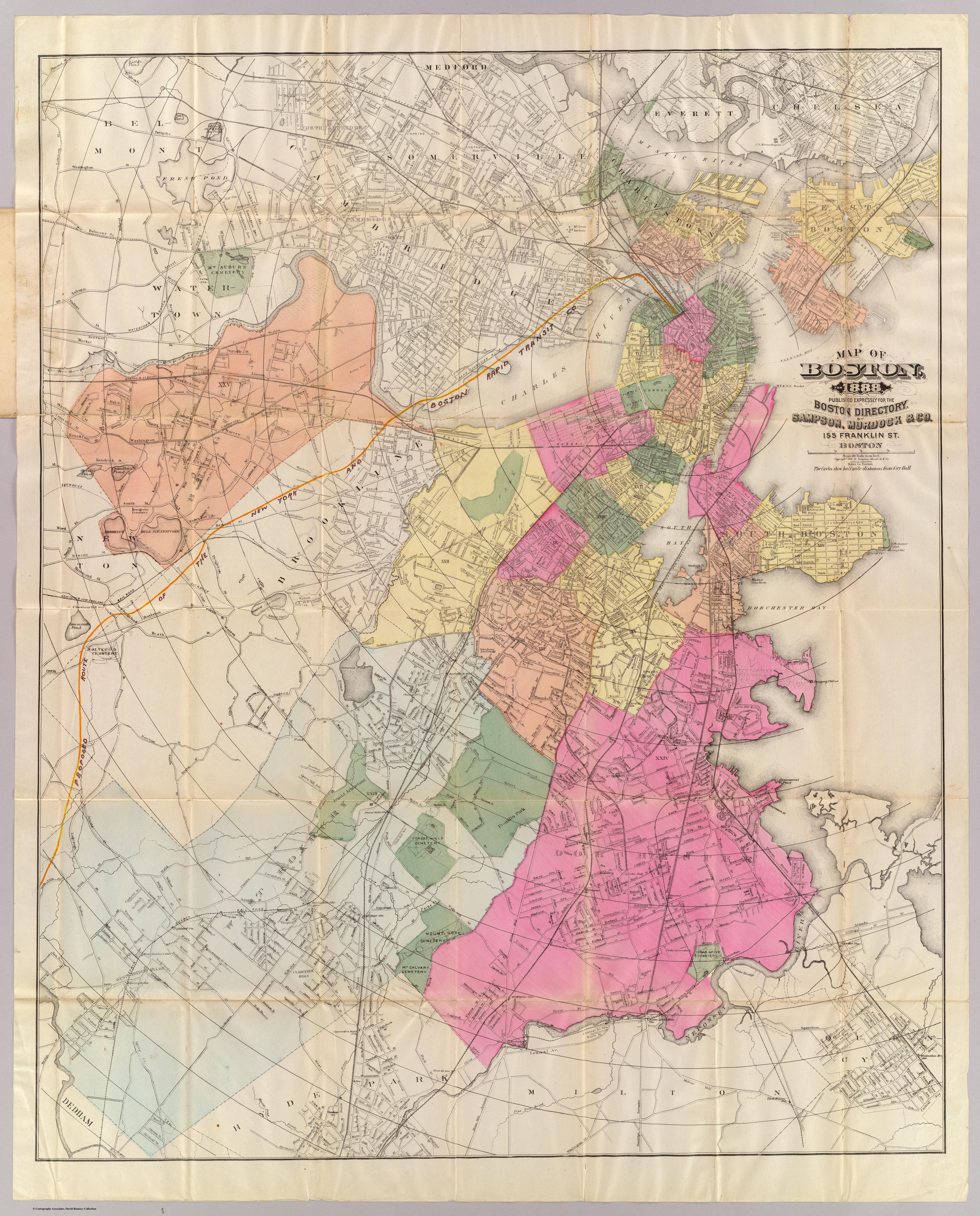
1888 map of Boston, with the proposed line in orange

The New York and Boston Rapid Transit Company planned to build an air-line railroad between New York City and Boston, Massachusetts.

Charles F. Conant acted as financial agent for the group of investors.

The idea was to start the railroad at the Boston and Lowell Railroad's terminal in Boston (now part of North Station), and run it along the B&L's new alignment (which had been made obsolete by the 1887 merger with the Boston and Maine Railroad), splitting at the merge with the old alignment, and heading southwest across Cambridge parallel to the Grand Junction Railroad. After crossing the Charles River the path continued through rural Massachusetts to Willimantic, New Haven and Bridgeport, Connecticut, entering Manhattan at High Bridge and going down the west side of Central Park to a terminal at Columbus Circle.
