= 1797 Vermont gubernatorial election =

- September 5, 1797
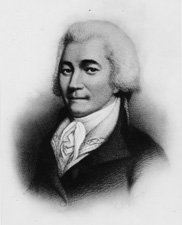

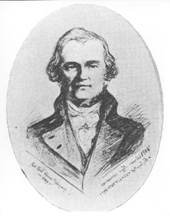
Nominee	Isaac Tichenor	Moses Robinson	Gideon Olin
Party	Federalist	Democratic-Republican	Democratic-Republican
Popular vote	2,325	1,000 (+/-)	700 (+/-)
Percentage	43.80%	33.06%	23.14%
Governor before election
Paul Brigham
Democratic-Republican
Elected Governor
Isaac Tichenor
Federalist

The Vermont gubernatorial election of 1797 took place on September 5, 1797. It resulted in the election of Isaac Tichenor to a one-year term.

The Vermont General Assembly met in Windsor on October 12. The Vermont House of Representatives appointed a committee to examine the votes of the freemen of Vermont for governor, lieutenant governor, treasurer, and members of the governor's council.

Thomas Chittenden, who had been governor from 1778 to 1789, and again starting in 1790, died in August 1797. Paul Brigham, the incumbent lieutenant governor, served as governor from Chittenden's death until the election of a successor.

In the popular election, no candidate received a majority. In keeping with the Vermont Constitution, the Vermont General Assembly was required to make a selection. On October 13, the Assembly chose Isaac Tichenor and a committee was appointed to notify him. Tichenor indicated that he would notify the General Assembly the following day as to whether he would accept the position. On October 14, Tichenor indicated his acceptance. He appeared before the Assembly on October 15 and took his oath of office.

In the election for lieutenant governor, the voters selected Paul Brigham for a second one-year term. The freemen also re-elected Samuel Mattocks as treasurer, his eleventh one-year term. The balloting totals for governor were given as indicated below. In the general assembly election for governor, the totals were recorded as: Tichenor, 94; Moses Robinson, 41; Israel Smith, 17; Gideon Olin 4; Elijah Paine, 1; Noah Smith, 1.

== Results ==
1797 Vermont gubernatorial election
Party	Candidate	Votes	%	±%
Federalist	Isaac Tichenor	1,325	43.80	
Democratic-Republican	Moses Robinson	1,000	33.06	
Democratic-Republican	Gideon Olin	700	23.14	
Total votes		3,025	100.0	
