= Enoch Woodbridge =

American judge (1750–1805)

Chief Judge of the Vermont Supreme Court
- In office 1798–1800
- Preceded by: Israel Smith
- Succeeded by: Jonathan Robinson

Associate Judge of the Vermont Supreme Court
- In office 1794–1798
- Preceded by: Elijah Paine
- Succeeded by: Noah Smith

Mayor of Vergennes, Vermont
- In office 1794–1796
- Preceded by: None (position created)
- Succeeded by: Roswell Hopkins

State's Attorney of Bennington County, Vermont
- In office 1789–1791
- Preceded by: Noah Smith
- Succeeded by: Noah Smith

Judge of Probate for the Manchester, Vermont District
- In office 1786–1787
- Preceded by: Martin Powell
- Succeeded by: Martin Powell

Register of Probate for the Manchester, Vermont District
- In office 1781–1786
- Preceded by: James Murdock
- Succeeded by: Truman Powell

Personal details
- Born: December 25, 1750 Stockbridge, Massachusetts, U.S.
- Died: April 21, 1805 (aged 54) Vergennes, Vermont, U.S.
- Resting place: Vergennes Burying Ground, Vergennes, Vermont, U.S.
- Spouse(s): Nancy Winchell (m. 1774); Sabrina Hopkins (m. 1802)
- Relations: John Eliot (great-grandfather); Timothy Woodbridge (father); Frederick E. Woodbridge (grandson)
- Children: 8
- Education: Yale College
- Profession: Attorney

Enoch Woodbridge (December 25, 1750 – April 21, 1805) was a Vermont attorney, politician, and judge. A veteran of the American Revolution, he served as a justice of the Vermont Supreme Court from 1794 to 1800, and chief justice from 1798 to 1800.

== Biography ==
Enoch Woodbridge was born in Stockbridge, Massachusetts on December 25, 1750. He graduated from Yale College in 1774, and joined the Patriot cause for the American Revolution. Initially assigned to militia forces that took part in the Siege of Boston, he subsequently served as adjutant of the Continental Army regiment commanded by John Paterson. Woodbridge was wounded at the Battle of White Plains, and settled in Pownal, Vermont, where he was first appointed quartermaster of Warner's Additional Regiment, and later as a commissary of issues, contracted to provide supplies and equipment for the Continental Army. He took part in the battles of Hubbardton, Bennington, and Saratoga, and served until 1780.

Following his military service, Woodbridge studied law, attained admission to the bar, and began to practice in Pownal. He subsequently relocated to Manchester, and then Vergennes, where he became a permanent resident. While residing in Manchester, Woodbridge served in local offices including lister and town meeting moderator, in addition to terms as State's Attorney for Bennington County, and Judge of Probate for the county's Manchester District.

After moving to Vergennes, Woodbridge served in the Vermont House of Representatives in 1791 and 1793, and was a delegate to Vermont's 1793 constitutional convention. When Vergennes was incorporated as a city in 1794, Woodbridge was elected mayor, and served two one-year terms. In 1794, he was appointed to the Vermont Supreme Court; he served until 1800, and was the court's Chief Justice from 1798 to 1800.

Woodbridge resumed practicing law in Vergennes after his retirement from the bench, and served again in the Vermont House in 1802. He died in Vergennes on April 21, 1805, and was buried at Vergennes Burying Ground.

== Family ==
Woodbridge was the son of Judge Timothy Woodbridge (1709–1774) of Stockbridge, Massachusetts and Abigail (Day) Woodbridge; his father died several months before Woodbridge's birth. His uncles John (1702–1783) and Benjamin Woodbridge (1712–1785) were both prominent New England clergymen. Woodbridge was also a direct descendant of Governor Thomas Dudley and Reverend John Woodbridge, and was the great-grandson of Reverend John Eliot.

In 1774, Woodbridge married Nancy Winchell of North East, New York. They were the parents of eight children. Nancy Woodbridge died in 1800, and in 1802 Woodbridge married Sabrina Hopkins, who died in 1807.

One of Woodbridge's sons was Enoch Day Woodbridge, who married Cora Strong, the daughter of General John Strong. Enoch D. and Cora Woodbridge were the parents of Frederick E. Woodbridge, a member of Congress from Vermont.

== Sources ==
- Aldrich, Lewis Cass (1889). History of Bennington County, Vt. Syracuse, NY: D. Mason & Co. p. 200.
- Dexter, Franklin Bowditch (1903). Biographical Sketches of the Graduates of Yale College. Vol. 3. New York, NY: Henry Holt and Company.
- Hemenway, Abby Maria (1867). The Vermont Historical Gazetteer. Vol. 1. Burlington, VT: A. M. Hemenway.
- Johnston, Henry Phelps (1888). Yale and Her Honor-roll in the American Revolution, 1775–1783. New York, NY: G. P. Putnam's Sons. p. 304.
- Ullery, Jacob G. (1894). Men of Vermont Illustrated. Brattleboro, VT: Transcript Publishing Company. p. 176.
