= 1795 Vermont gubernatorial election =

- September 1, 1795
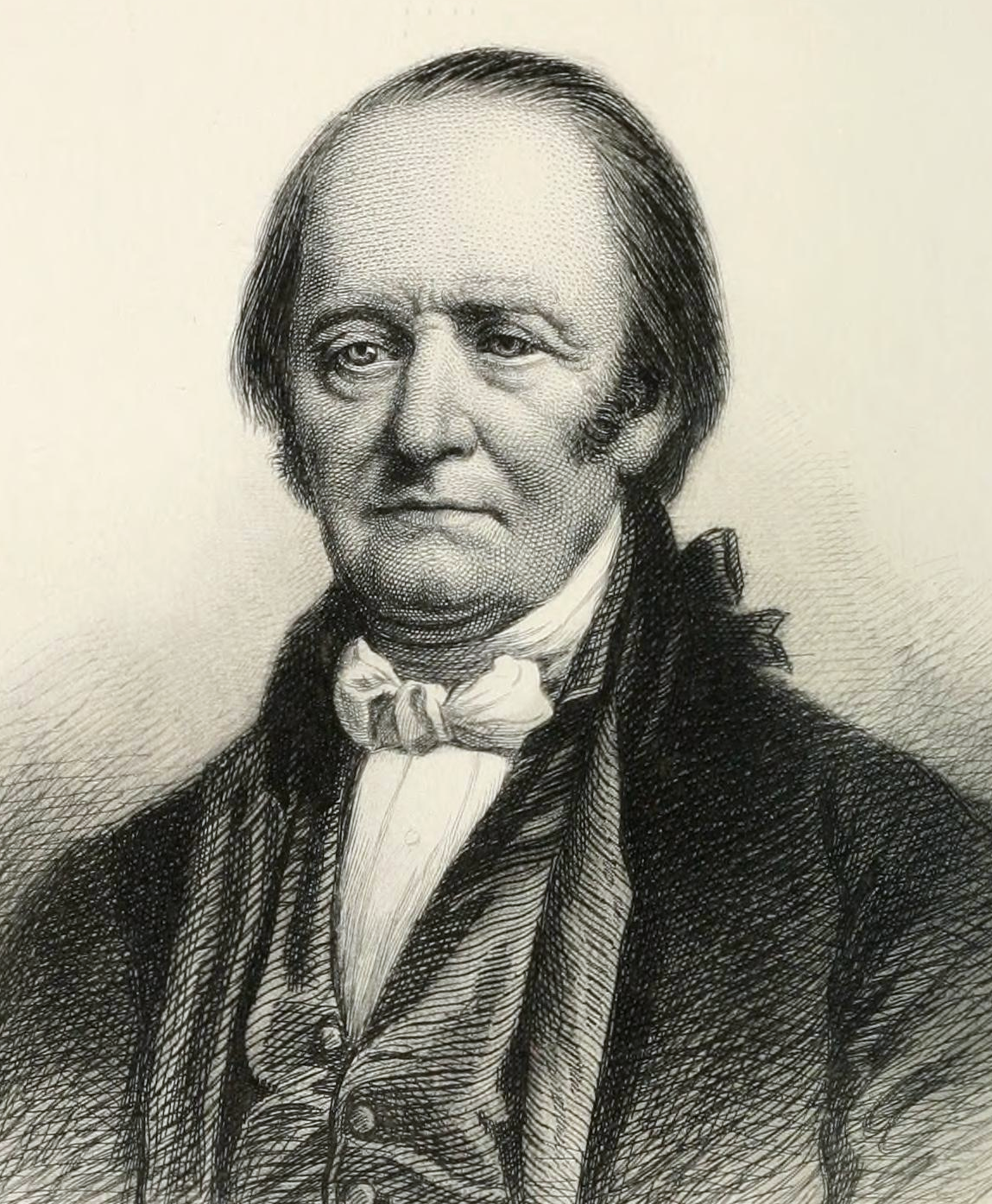

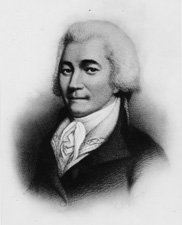
Nominee	Thomas Chittenden	Isaac Tichenor
Party	Independent	Federalist
Popular vote	4,260	2,038
Percentage	60.73%	29.05%
Governor before election
Thomas Chittenden
Independent
Elected Governor
Thomas Chittenden
Independent

The 1795 Vermont gubernatorial election took place on September 1, 1795. It resulted in the re-election of Governor Thomas Chittenden to a one-year term.

The Vermont General Assembly met in Windsor on October 8. The Vermont House of Representatives appointed a committee to examine the votes of the freemen of Vermont for governor, lieutenant governor, treasurer, and members of the governor's council.

In the race for governor, Thomas Chittenden, who had been governor from 1778 to 1789, and again starting in 1790, was re-elected for a one-year term. In the election for lieutenant governor, Jonathan Hunt was reelected to a second one-year term.

The freemen also re-elected Samuel Mattocks as treasurer, his ninth one-year term.

== Results ==
1795 Vermont gubernatorial election
Party	Candidate	Votes	%	±%
Independent	Thomas Chittenden (incumbent)	4,260	60.73	+8.8
Federalist	Isaac Tichenor	2,038	29.05	−10.5
Federalist	Samuel Williams	256	3.65	+3.6
Democratic-Republican	Gideon Olin	149	2.12	+2.1
Democratic-Republican	Nathaniel Niles	138	1.97	+2.0
Write-in		174	2.48	-6
Total votes		7,015	100.0	N/A
