= 1793 Vermont gubernatorial election =

- September 3, 1793
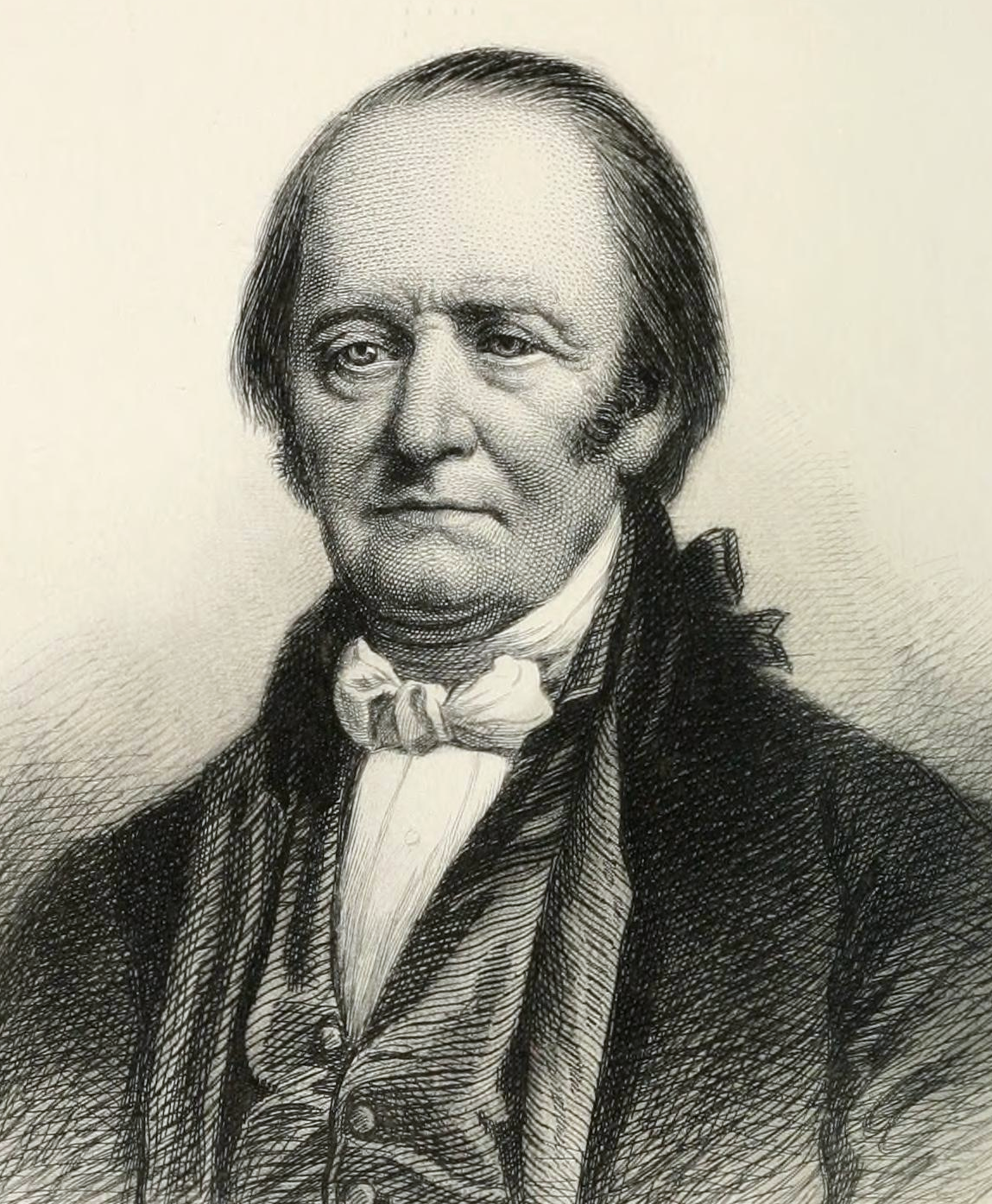

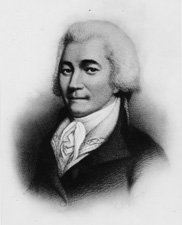
Nominee	Thomas Chittenden	Isaac Tichenor
Party	Independent	Federalist
Popular vote	3,187	2,712
Percentage	52.48%	44.66%
- County results Chittenden: 50–60% 70–80% Tichenor: 40–50% 50–60% 60–70% 70–80% No Data/Vote
Governor before election
Thomas Chittenden
Independent
Elected Governor
Thomas Chittenden
Independent

The 1793 Vermont gubernatorial election took place on September 3, 1793. It resulted in the re-election of Governor Thomas Chittenden to a one-year term.

The Vermont General Assembly met in Rutland on October 10. On October 11, the Vermont House of Representatives appointed a committee to examine the votes of the freemen of Vermont for governor, lieutenant governor, treasurer, and members of the governor's council.

In the race for governor, Thomas Chittenden, who had been governor from 1778 to 1789, and again starting in 1790, was re-elected for a one-year term. In the election for lieutenant governor, Peter Olcott was re-elected to a fourth one-year term. The freemen also re-elected Samuel Mattocks as treasurer, his seventh one-year term. The names of candidates and balloting totals for governor were recorded as detailed below.

== Results ==
1793 Vermont gubernatorial election
Party	Candidate	Votes	%
Nonpartisan	Thomas Chittenden (incumbent)	3,187	52.48
Nonpartisan	Isaac Tichenor	2,712	44.66
Nonpartisan	Noah Smith	174	2.86
Total votes		6,073	100.0
