= 1799 Vermont gubernatorial election =

- September 3, 1799
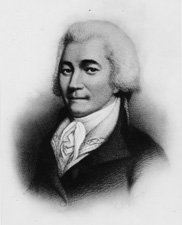

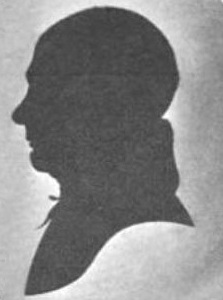
Nominee	Isaac Tichenor	Israel Smith
Party	Federalist	Democratic-Republican
Popular vote	7,454	3,915
Percentage	64.24%	33.74%
- County results Tichenor: 50–60% 60–70% 70–80% 80–90% 90–100% Smith: 60–70% 70–80% No Data/Vote
Governor before election
Isaac Tichenor
Federalist
Elected Governor
Isaac Tichenor
Federalist

The 1799 Vermont gubernatorial election took place on September 3, 1799. It resulted in the re-election of Isaac Tichenor to a one-year term.

The Vermont General Assembly met in Windsor on October 10. The Vermont House of Representatives appointed a committee to examine the votes of the freemen of Vermont for governor, lieutenant governor, treasurer, and members of the governor's council.

On October 11, the committee examined the votes, which showed that Isaac Tichenor was chosen for a third one-year term. In the election for lieutenant governor, the voters selected Paul Brigham for a fourth one-year term. The freemen also re-elected Samuel Mattocks as treasurer, his thirteenth one-year term. Vote totals were reported in local newspapers as follows.

== Results ==
1799 Vermont gubernatorial election
Party	Candidate	Votes	%	±%
Federalist	Isaac Tichenor (incumbent)	7,454	64.24	-2.2
Democratic-Republican	Israel Smith	3,915	33.74	+3.7
Write-in		234	2.02	-1.5
Total votes		11,603	100.0	N/A
