= 1801 Vermont gubernatorial election =

- September 1, 1801
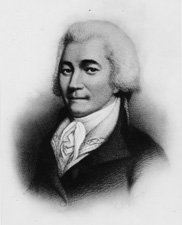

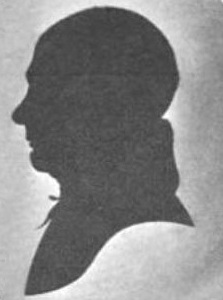
Nominee	Isaac Tichenor	Israel Smith
Party	Federalist	Democratic-Republican
Popular vote	4,493	2,872
Percentage	59.52%	38.05%
- County results Tichenor: 60–70% 80–90% 90–100% Smith: 50–60% 60–70% 70–80%
Governor before election
Isaac Tichenor
Federalist
Elected Governor
Isaac Tichenor
Federalist

The 1801 Vermont gubernatorial election took place on September 1, 1801. It resulted in the re-election of Isaac Tichenor to a one-year term.

The Vermont General Assembly met in Newbury on October 8. The Vermont House of Representatives appointed a committee to examine the votes of the freemen of Vermont for governor, lieutenant governor, treasurer, and members of the governor's council.

The committee examined the votes, which showed that Isaac Tichenor was chosen for a fifth one-year term. In the election for lieutenant governor, the voters selected Paul Brigham for a sixth one-year term. Benjamin Swan was elected to a second one-year term as treasurer. One Vermont newspaper reported the vote totals as follows:

== Results ==
1801 Vermont gubernatorial election
Party	Candidate	Votes	%
Federalist	Isaac Tichenor (incumbent)	4,493	59.52%
Democratic-Republican	Israel Smith	2,872	38.05%
