= 1794 Vermont gubernatorial election =

- September 2, 1794
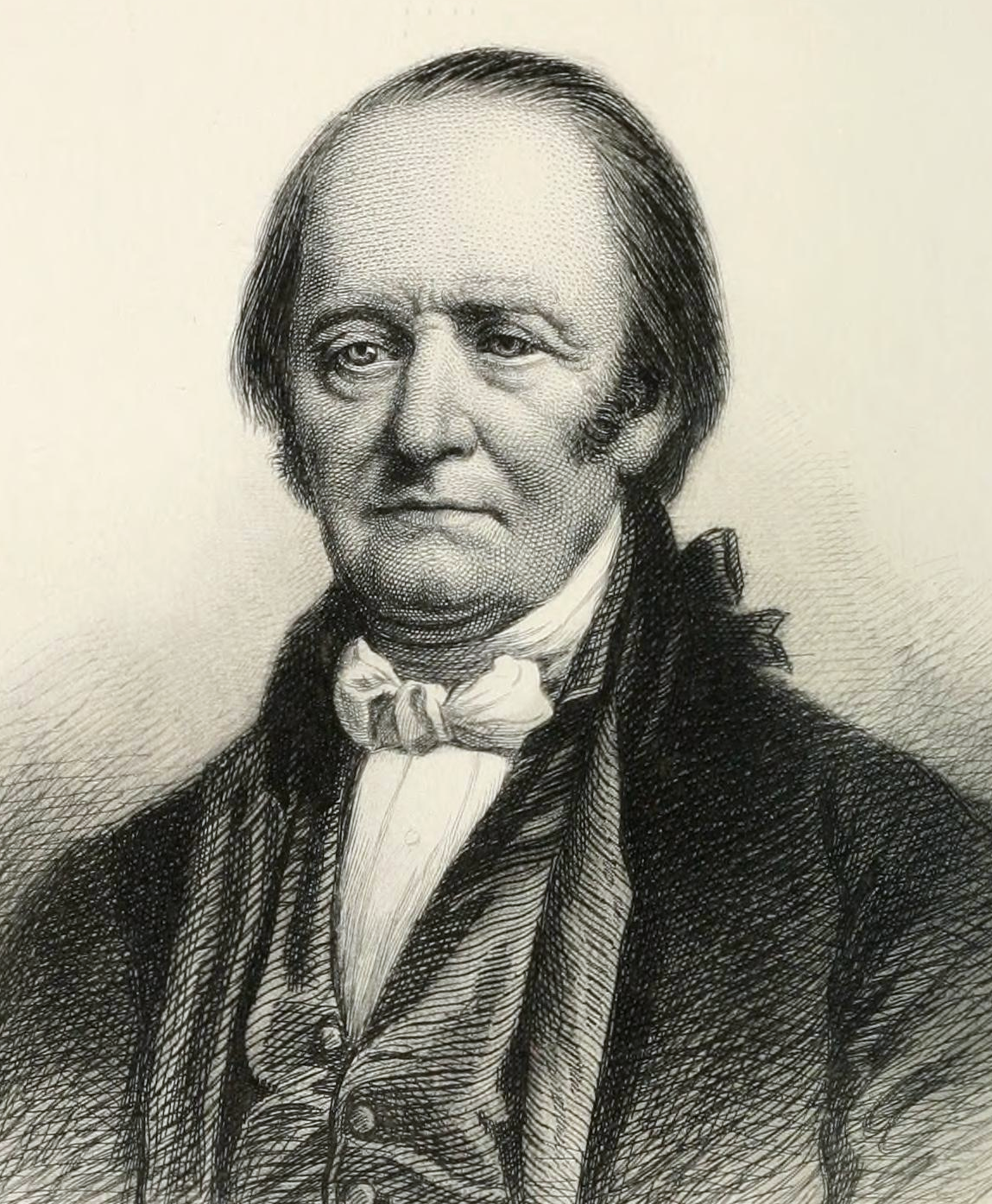

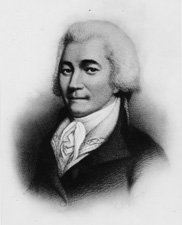
Nominee	Thomas Chittenden	Isaac Tichenor
Party	Independent	Federalist
Popular vote	2,623	2,000
Percentage	51.89%	39.56%
- County results Chittenden: 50–60% 60–70% 70–80% Tichenor: 40–50% 70–80% No Data/Vote
Governor before election
Thomas Chittenden
Independent
Elected Governor
Thomas Chittenden
Independent

The 1794 Vermont gubernatorial election took place on September 2, 1794. It resulted in the re-election of Governor Thomas Chittenden to a one-year term.

The Vermont General Assembly met in Rutland on October 9. The Vermont House of Representatives appointed a committee to examine the votes of the freemen of Vermont for governor, lieutenant governor, treasurer, and members of the governor's council. The body met to count the votes on the morning of October 10.

In the race for governor, Thomas Chittenden, who had been governor from 1778 to 1789, and again starting in 1790, was re-elected for a one-year term. The freemen also re-elected Samuel Mattocks as treasurer, his eighth one-year term.

In the election for lieutenant governor, no candidate received a majority. In keeping with the Vermont Constitution, the Assembly was required to choose. On the afternoon of October 10, the body elected Jonathan Hunt. Hunt declined the appointment and the Assembly adjourned. On the morning of October 11, Hunt agreed to accept the position and took the oath of office.

Chittenden won the election by over six hundred votes.

== Results ==
1794 Vermont gubernatorial election
Party	Candidate	Votes	%	±%
Independent	Thomas Chittenden (incumbent)	2,623	51.89	+0.1
Federalist	Isaac Tichenor	2,000	39.56	−4.4
Write-in		432	8.55	+7.1
Total votes		5,055	100.0	N/A
