= 1804 Vermont gubernatorial election =

- September 4, 1804
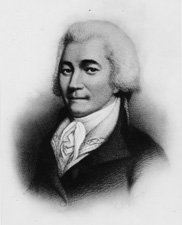

Nominee	Isaac Tichenor	Jonathan Robinson
Party	Federalist	Democratic-Republican
Popular vote	8,796	6,665
Percentage	56.89%	43.11%
Governor before election
Isaac Tichenor
Federalist
Elected Governor
Isaac Tichenor
Federalist

The 1804 Vermont gubernatorial election took place on September 4, 1804. It resulted in the re-election of Isaac Tichenor to a one-year term.

The Vermont General Assembly met in Rutland on October 11. The Vermont House of Representatives appointed a committee to examine the votes of the freemen of Vermont for governor, lieutenant governor, treasurer, and members of the governor's council.

The committee examined the votes, which showed that Isaac Tichenor was chosen for an eighth one-year term. In the election for lieutenant governor, the voters selected Paul Brigham for a ninth one-year term. Benjamin Swan was elected to a fifth one-year term as treasurer. According to contemporary newspaper accounts, the vote totals for governor were as follows.

In the races for lieutenant governor and treasurer, the totals were not recorded, but Brigham and Swan were reported to have received majorities of over 4,000 votes.

== Results ==
1804 Vermont gubernatorial election
Party	Candidate	Votes	%
Federalist	Isaac Tichenor (incumbent)	8,796	56.89
Democratic-Republican	Jonathan Robinson	6,665	43.11
Total votes		15,461	100.0
