= 1805 Vermont gubernatorial election =

- September 3, 1805
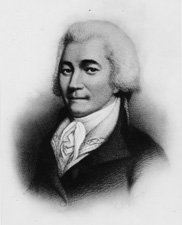

Nominee	Isaac Tichenor	Jonathan Robinson
Party	Federalist	Democratic-Republican
Popular vote	9,167	5,260
Percentage	61.21%	35.12%
- County results Tichenor: 50–60% 60–70% 70–80% 80–90% Robinson: 50–60% No Data/Vote
Governor before election
Isaac Tichenor
Federalist
Elected Governor
Isaac Tichenor
Federalist

The 1805 Vermont gubernatorial election took place on September 3, 1805. It resulted in the re-election of Isaac Tichenor to a one-year term.

The Vermont General Assembly met in Danville on October 10. The Vermont House of Representatives appointed a committee to examine the votes of the freemen of Vermont for governor, lieutenant governor, treasurer, and members of the governor's council.

The committee examined the votes, which showed that Isaac Tichenor was chosen for a ninth one-year term. In the election for lieutenant governor, the voters selected Paul Brigham for a tenth one-year term. Benjamin Swan was elected to a sixth one-year term as treasurer. According to contemporary newspaper accounts, the vote totals for governor were as follows.

In the races for lieutenant governor and treasurer, the totals were not recorded, but Brigham was reported to have won by a majority of 5,590. Swan's majority was 3,440.

== Results ==
1805 Vermont gubernatorial election
Party	Candidate	Votes	%
Federalist	Isaac Tichenor (incumbent)	9,167	61.21
Democratic-Republican	Jonathan Robinson	5,260	35.12
Write-in		549	3.67
Total votes		14,976	100.0
