= Resignation from the United States Senate =

Process to be followed

A member of the United States Senate can resign by writing a letter of resignation to the governor of the state that the senator represents. Under Article I, Section 3 of the Constitution of the United States, and under the Seventeenth Amendment, in case of a vacancy in the Senate resulting from resignation, the executive authority of the state (today known in every state as the governor) can make a temporary appointment to fill the vacancy if so authorized by the state legislature. A special election may follow depending on timing and state law. Whenever a senator needs to be appointed or elected, the Secretary of the Senate mails one of three forms to the state's governor to inform that person of the proper wording to certify the appointment of a new Senator.

The first resignation from the Senate was that of William Paterson of New Jersey on November 13, 1790, who resigned in order to accept the office of Governor of New Jersey. His resignation was only the third time a person ceased to hold a seat in the Senate, which had first convened during the preceding year, 1789. The earlier ones resulted from the death of Senator William Grayson of Virginia, and the expiration of the term of the temporary senator John Walker of Virginia, who was appointed by the Governor of Virginia to hold that office until a successor could be elected in November.

Before 1796, eight senators resigned. Nine senators resigned during that year—a record-high number that stands to this day. Most resignations have been motivated either by declining health or a decision to accept another office. Sixteen persons have resigned from the Senate twice and two have resigned three times.

== 1789 to 1799 ==
Name	State	Date of resignation	Notes
William Paterson	New Jersey	November 13, 1790	Resigned to become Governor of New Jersey.
Samuel Johnson	Connecticut	March 3, 1791	
Richard Lee	Virginia	October 8, 1792	
Charles Carroll	Maryland	November 30, 1792	
George Read	Delaware	September 18, 1793	
James Monroe	Virginia	March 27, 1794	
John Taylor of Caroline	Virginia	May 11, 1794	
James Jackson	Georgia	November 16, 1795	
Oliver Ellsworth	Connecticut	March 8, 1796	
Rufus King	New York	May 23, 1796	
Caleb Strong	Massachusetts	June 1, 1796	
George Cabot	Massachusetts	June 9, 1796	
Jonathan Trumbull Jr.	Connecticut	June 10, 1796	
Moses Robinson	Vermont	October 15, 1796	
Richard Potts	Maryland	October 24, 1796	
Pierce Butler	South Carolina	October 25, 1796	
Frederick Frelinghuysen	New Jersey	November 12, 1796	
William Cocke	Tennessee	September 26, 1797	
William Bradford	Rhode Island	October ??, 1797	
Isaac Tichenor	Vermont	October 17, 1797	Resigned to become Governor of Vermont.
John Henry	Maryland	December 10, 1797	
Philip Schuyler	New York	January 3, 1798	
John Vining	Delaware	January 19, 1798	
Andrew Jackson	Tennessee	April 1, 1798	
John Sloss Hobart	New York	April 16, 1798	
John Hunter	South Carolina	November 26, 1798	
John Rutherfurd	New Jersey	December 5, 1798	
Joseph Anderson	Tennessee	March 3, 1799	

== 1800 to 1849 ==
Name	State	Date of resignation	Notes
Samuel Dexter	Massachusetts	May 30, 1800	Resigned to take office as United States Secretary of War.
John Laurance	New York	August 1, 1800	
Benjamin Goodhue	Massachusetts	November 8, 1800	
James Lloyd	Maryland	December 1, 1800	
James Schureman	New Jersey	February 16, 1801	
Henry Latimer	Delaware	February 28, 1801	
Ray Greene	Rhode Island	March 5, 1801	
Charles Pinckney	South Carolina	June 6, 1801	
Samuel Livermore	New Hampshire	June 12, 1801	
Elijah Paine	Vermont	September 1, 1801	
John Armstrong Jr.	New York	February 5, 1802	
James Sheafe	New Hampshire	June 14, 1802	
Dwight Foster	Massachusetts	March 2, 1803	
DeWitt Clinton	New York	November 4, 1803	
Theodorus Bailey	New York	January 16, 1804	
John Armstrong Jr.	New York	February 23, 1804	
Abraham B. Venable	Virginia	June 7, 1804	
John Armstrong Jr.	New York	June 30, 1804	
William H. Wells	Delaware	November 6, 1804	
William Giles	Virginia	December 3, 1804	
Andrew Moore	Virginia	December 3, 1804	Resigned his Class 2 senatorship when elected to fill a vacant Class 1 senatorship.
John Breckinridge	Kentucky	August 7, 1805	
Robert Wright	Maryland	November 12, 1806	
John Adair	Kentucky	November 18, 1806	
David Stone	North Carolina	February 17, 1807	
James Fenner	Rhode Island	September ??, 1807	
Israel Smith	Vermont	October 1, 1807	
John Smith	Ohio	April 25, 1808	Resigned after being indicted but not expelled in a 19–10 vote.
John Quincy Adams	Massachusetts	June 8, 1808	
Samuel Maclay	Pennsylvania	January 4, 1809	
Aaron Kitchell	New Jersey	March 3, 1809	
Daniel Smith	Tennessee	March 31, 1809	
John Milledge	Georgia	November 14, 1809	
Buckner Thruston	Kentucky	December 18, 1809	
Nahum Parker	New Hampshire	June 1, 1810	
James Hillhouse	Connecticut	June 10, 1810	
Return J. Meigs Jr.	Ohio	December 8, 1810	
Thomas Sumter	South Carolina	December 16, 1810	
Jenkin Whiteside	Tennessee	October 8, 1811	
Christopher Champlin	Rhode Island	October 12, 1811	
Jean Noel Destréhan	Louisiana	October 1, 1812	
James Bayard	Delaware	March 3, 1813	
Dudley Chase	Vermont	March 3, 1813	
William Crawford	Georgia	March 23, 1813	
James Lloyd	Massachusetts	May 1, 1813	
Chauncey Goodrich	Connecticut	May 13, 1813	
George W. Campbell	Tennessee	February 11, 1814	
Michael Leib	Pennsylvania	February 14, 1814	
George Bibb	Kentucky	August 23, 1814	
Thomas Worthington	Ohio	December 1, 1814	
Jesse Bledsoe	Kentucky	December 24, 1814	
David Stone	North Carolina	December 24, 1814	
William Giles	Virginia	March 3, 1815	
Francis Locke Jr.	North Carolina	December 5, 1815	
William T. Barry	Kentucky	May 1, 1816	
Christopher Gore	Massachusetts	May 30, 1816	
John Taylor	South Carolina	November ??, 1816	
Wyatt Bibb	Georgia	November 9, 1816	
James Turner	North Carolina	November 21, 1816	
Goodloe Harper	Maryland	December 6, 1816	
Jeremiah Mason	New Hampshire	June 16, 1817	
James Fisk	Vermont	January 8, 1818	
George W. Campbell	Tennessee	April 20, 1818	
Eli Ashmun	Massachusetts	May 10, 1818	
George Troup	Georgia	September 23, 1818	
John Forsyth	Georgia	February 17, 1819	
John J. Crittenden	Kentucky	March 3, 1819	
John Wayles Eppes	Virginia	December 4, 1819	
Prentiss Mellen	Massachusetts	May 15, 1820	
Walter Leake	Mississippi	May 15, 1820	
William Logan	Kentucky	May 28, 1820	
James Wilson	New Jersey	January 8, 1821	
Freeman Walker	Georgia	August 6, 1821	
Harrison Gray Otis	Massachusetts	May 30, 1822	
John Williams Walker	Alabama	December 12, 1822	
James Pleasants	Virginia	December 15, 1822	
Caesar Augustus Rodney	Delaware	January 29, 1823	
Samuel Southard	New Jersey	March 3, 1823	
James Brown	Louisiana	December 10, 1823	
Ninian Edwards	Illinois	March 3, 1824	
Henry Johnson	Louisiana	May 27, 1824	
James Barbour	Virginia	March 7, 1825	
David Holmes	Mississippi	September 25, 1825	
Andrew Jackson	Tennessee	October 14, 1825	
James DeWolf	Rhode Island	October 31, 1825	
Edward Lloyd	Maryland	January 14, 1826	
James Lloyd	Massachusetts	May 23, 1826	
Henry Harrison	Ohio	May 20, 1828	
Albion Parris	Maine	August 26, 1828	
Thomas Cobb	Georgia	November 7, 1828	
Nathaniel Macon	North Carolina	December 14, 1828	
Ephraim Bateman	New Jersey	January 12, 1829	
Mahlon Dickerson	New Jersey	January 30, 1829	
John Berrien	Georgia	March 9, 1829	
John Branch	North Carolina	March 9, 1829	
John Eaton	Tennessee	March 9, 1829	
Louis McLane	Delaware	April 16, 1829	
Edward Livingston	Louisiana	May 24, 1831	
Issac Barnard	Pennsylvania	December 6, 1831	
Powhatan Ellis	Mississippi	July 16, 1832	
Littleton Tazewell	Virginia	July 16, 1832	
Robert Hayne	South Carolina	December 13, 1832	
William Marcy	New York	January 1, 1833	
George Troup	Georgia	November 8, 1833	
William Rives	Virginia	February 22, 1834	
John Forsyth	Georgia	June 27, 1834	
Ezekiel Chambers	Maryland	December 20, 1834	
Peleg Sprague	Maine	January 1, 1835	
Charles Gayarré	Louisiana	January ??, 1836	
John Tyler	Virginia	February 29, 1836	
Ether Shepley	Maine	March 3, 1836	
Willie Mangum	North Carolina	March 19, 1836	
Isaac Hill	New Hampshire	May 30, 1836	
Arnold Naudain	Delaware	June 16, 1836	
Benjamin Leigh	Virginia	July 4, 1836	
John Clayton	Delaware	December 29, 1836	
Alexander Porter	Louisiana	January 5, 1837	
Richard Parker	Virginia	March 13, 1837	
John McKinley	Alabama	April 22, 1837	
Pendleton King	Georgia	November 1, 1837	
John Black	Mississippi	January 22, 1838	
Felix Grundy	Tennessee	July 4, 1838	
James F. Trotter	Mississippi	July 10, 1838	
Ephraim Foster	Tennessee	March 3, 1839	
Richard Bayard	Delaware	September 19, 1839	
Lawson White	Tennessee	January 13, 1840	
Robert Strange	North Carolina	November 16, 1840	
Bedford Brown	North Carolina	November 16, 1840	
John Davis	Massachusetts	January 5, 1841	
Daniel Webster	Massachusetts	February 22, 1841	Resigned to become United States Secretary of State.
Comer Clay	Alabama	November 15, 1841	
Franklin Pierce	New Hampshire	February 28, 1842	
Alexander Mouton	Louisiana	March 1, 1842	
Henry Clay	Kentucky	March 31, 1842	
Samuel Prentiss	Vermont	April 11, 1842	
Samuel Southard	New Jersey	June 26, 1842	
Reuel Williams	Maine	February 15, 1843	
John Calhoun	South Carolina	March 3, 1843	
William Sprague	Rhode Island	January 17, 1844	
William King	Alabama	April 15, 1844	
Nathaniel Tallmadge	New York	June 17, 1844	
Silas Wright Jr.	New York	November 26, 1844	
John Berrien	Georgia	March 1, 1845	
Elliot Huger	South Carolina	March 3, 1845	
Levi Woodbury	New Hampshire	September 20, 1845	
William Haywood Jr.	North Carolina	July 25, 1846	
Walter Colquitt	Georgia	February 4, 1848	
Ambrose Sevier	Arkansas	March 15, 1848	
Lewis Cass	Michigan	May 29, 1848	
John Crittenden	Kentucky	June 12, 1848	
Arthur P. Bagby	Alabama	June 16, 1848	
John M. Clayton	Delaware	February 2, 1849	
Reverdy Johnson	Maryland	March 7, 1849	

== 1850 to 1899 ==
Name	State	Party	Date of resignation	Notes
Daniel Webster	Massachusetts	Whig	July 22, 1850	Resigned again to again take office as United States Secretary of State.
Jefferson Davis	Mississippi	Democratic	September 23, 1851	Resigned to run for Governor of Mississippi.
Robert Rhett	South Carolina	Democratic	May 7, 1852	
John Berrien	Georgia	Whig	May 28, 1852	
William R. King	Alabama	Democratic	December 20, 1852	Resigned to take office as Vice President of the United States.
Robert Stockton	New Jersey	Democratic	January 10, 1853	Resigned to serve as president of the Delaware and Raritan Canal Company.
Solon Borland	Arkansas	Democratic	April 11, 1853	Resigned on being appointed as Ambassador of the United States to Nicaragua.
Pierre Soulé	Louisiana	Democratic	April 11, 1853	Resigned on being appointed as Ambassador of the United States to Spain.
Edward Everett	Massachusetts	Whig	June 1, 1854	Resigned due to ill health
Augustus C. Dodge	Iowa	Democratic	February 22, 1855	Resigned on being appointed as Ambassador of the United States to Spain.
Hannibal Hamlin	Maine	Republican	January 7, 1857	Resigned to take office as Governor of Maine
Asa Biggs	North Carolina	Democratic	May 5, 1858	Resigned to take office as a judge of the United States District Court for the District of North Carolina
Hannibal Hamlin	Maine	Republican	January 17, 1861	Resigned to take office as Vice President of the United States
Jefferson Davis	Mississippi	Democratic	January 21, 1861	Resigned because State seceded from the Union. Subsequently elected Major General of the Mississippi Militia and President of the Confederate States of America.
John Slidell	Louisiana	Democratic	February 4, 1861	Resigned because State seceded from the Union.
Thomas Bragg	North Carolina	Democratic	March 6, 1861	Resigned because State seceded from the Union.
Salmon P. Chase	Ohio	Republican	March 6, 1861	Resigned to take office as United States Secretary of the Treasury
Andrew Johnson	Tennessee	Democratic	March 4, 1862	Resigned to take office as Military Governor of Tennessee.
James F. Simmons	Rhode Island	Republican	August 15, 1862	Resigned after a case for expulsion for corruption was declined.
Waitman T. Willey	Virginia	Unionist	March 3, 1863	Resigned to become Senator of newly created West Virginia.
James A. Bayard Jr.	Delaware	Democratic	January 29, 1864	Resigned in protest of new Senate Loyalty Oath.
William P. Fessenden	Maine	Republican	July 1, 1864	Resigned to take office as United States Secretary of the Treasury.
James Harlan	Iowa	Republican	May 15, 1865	Resigned to take office as the United States Secretary of the Interior.
Daniel Clark	New Hampshire	Republican	July 27, 1866	Resigned to take office as a judge of the United States District Court for the District of New Hampshire.
James Gurthrie	Kentucky	Democratic	February 7, 1868	Resigned due to ill health.
Reverdy Johnson	Maryland	Democratic	July 10, 1868	
James W. Grimes	Iowa	Republican	December 6, 1869	Resigned due to ill health.
Charles D. Drake	Missouri	Republican	December 19, 1870	Resigned to take office as Chief Justice of the United States Court of Claims
William Pitt Kellogg	Louisiana	Republican	November 1, 1872	Resigned to take office as Governor of Louisiana.
Henry Wilson	Massachusetts	Republican	March 3, 1873	Resigned to take office as Vice President of the United States.
Alexander Caldwell	Kansas	Republican	March 24, 1873	Resigned before a vote could be taken on his expulsion for corruption.
Eugene Casserly	California	Democratic	November 29, 1873	
Adelbert Ames	Mississippi	Republican	January 4, 1874	Resigned to take office as Governor of Mississippi.
Lot M. Morrill	Maine	Republican	July 7, 1876	Resigned to take office as United States Secretary of the Treasury.
John Sherman	Ohio	Republican	March 8, 1877	Resigned to take office as United States Secretary of the Treasury.
Isaac P. Christiancy	Michigan	Republican	February 10, 1879	Resigned due to ill health
John Brown Gordon	Georgia	Democratic	May 26, 1880	
James G. Blaine	Maine	Republican	March 5, 1881	Resigned to take office as United States Secretary of State.
Samuel J. Kirkwood	Iowa	Republican	March 7, 1881	Resigned to take office as United States Secretary of the Interior
William Windom	Minnesota	Republican	March 7, 1881	Resigned to take office as United States Secretary of the Treasury
Roscoe Conkling	New York	Republican	May 16, 1881	Resigned in protest of the appointment of a New York City customs collector by President James A. Garfield.
Thomas Platt	New York	Republican	May 16, 1881	Resigned in support of fellow Senator Conkling's protest.
Henry M. Teller	Colorado	Republican	April 17, 1882	Resigned to take office as United States Secretary of the Interior
Augustus Hill Garland	Arkansas	Democratic	March 6, 1885	Resigned to take office as United States Attorney General
Thomas F. Bayard	Delaware	Democratic	March 6, 1885	Resigned to take office as United States Secretary of State
Howell Edmunds Jackson	Tennessee	Democratic	April 14, 1886	Resigned to take office as a judge of the United States Circuit Courts for the Sixth Circuit
Jonathan Chace	Rhode Island	Republican	April 9, 1889	
John Henninger Reagan	Texas	Democratic	June 10, 1891	Resigned to take office as the chairman of the Railroad Commission of Texas
John Carlisle	Kentucky	Democratic	February 4, 1893	Resigned to take office as United States Secretary of the Treasury
Edward Douglass White	Louisiana	Democratic	March 12, 1894	Resigned to take office as an Associate Justice of the Supreme Court of the United States
John Sherman	Ohio	Republican	March 4, 1897	Resigned to take office as United States Secretary of State.

== 1900 to 1949 ==
Name	State	Party	Date of resignation	Notes
William A. Clark	Montana	Democratic	May 15, 1900	Resigned before a Senate vote on declaring his election void due to bribery.
Charles W. Fairbanks	Indiana	Republican	March 3, 1905	Resigned to take office as Vice President of the United States.
Joseph Burton	Kansas	Republican	June 4, 1906	Resigned following corruption charges (Burton v. United States).
John Coit Spooner	Wisconsin	Republican	April 30, 1907	
Philander C. Knox	Pennsylvania	Republican	March 4, 1909	Resigned to take office as United States Secretary of State.
Fountain L. Thompson	North Dakota	Democratic	January 31, 1910	
Joseph M. Terrell	Georgia	Democratic	July 14, 1911	Resigned for health reasons.
Joseph Weldon Bailey	Texas	Democratic	January 3, 1913	
Warren G. Harding	Ohio	Republican	January 13, 1921	First President of the United States to be elected during his term as a Senator
John F. Nugent	Idaho	Democratic	January 14, 1921	Resigned to take office as a member of the Federal Trade Commission.
Albert B. Fall	New Mexico	Republican	March 4, 1921	Resigned to take office as United States Secretary of the Interior
Josiah O. Wolcott	Delaware	Democratic	July 2, 1921	Resigned to take office as Chancellor of Delaware
William Kenyon	Iowa	Republican	February 24, 1922	Resigned to take office as a federal judge on the United States Court of Appeals for the 8th Circuit
Truman Newberry	Michigan	Republican	November 18, 1922	Resigned after being condemned for violating campaign financing issues under Newberry v. United States.
Frank L. Smith	Illinois	Republican	February 9, 1928	Resigned after the Senate voted to refuse to seat him due to fraud and corruption.
T. Coleman du Pont	Delaware	Republican	December 8, 1928	Resigned to allow early appointment of successor.
Charles Curtis	Kansas	Republican	March 3, 1929	Resigned to take office as Vice President of the United States.
Evans Edge	New Jersey	Republican	November 21, 1929	Resigned to take office as Ambassador of the United States to France.
Frederic M. Sackett	Kentucky	Republican	January 9, 1930	Resigned to take office as Ambassador of the United States to Germany.
Cordell Hull	Tennessee	Democratic	March 3, 1933	Resigned to take office as United States Secretary of State.
Claude A. Swanson	Virginia	Democratic	March 3, 1933	Resigned to take office as United States Secretary of the Navy.
Sam G. Bratton	New Mexico	Democratic	June 24, 1933	Resigned to take office as a federal judge on the United States Court of Appeals for the 10th Circuit.
Hugo Black	Alabama	Democratic	August 19, 1937	Resigned to take office as an associate justice of the United States Supreme Court.
Dixie Bibb Graves	Alabama	Democratic	January 10, 1938	
Harry Moore	New Jersey	Democratic	January 17, 1938	Resigned to take office as Governor of New Jersey.
Frederick Steiwer	Oregon	Republican	January 31, 1938	
William Gibbs McAdoo	California	Democratic	November 8, 1938	
Matthew M. Neely	West Virginia	Democratic	January 12, 1941	Resigned to take office as Governor of West Virginia.
John E. Miller	Arkansas	Democratic	March 31, 1941	Resigned to take office as a federal judge on the District Court for the Western District of Arkansas
James Byrnes	South Carolina	Democratic	July 8, 1941	Resigned to take office as Associate Justice of the Supreme Court of the United States.
Henry Cabot Lodge Jr.	Massachusetts	Republican	February 3, 1944	Resigned to return to active duty in the United States Army during World War II.
Homer Bone	Washington	Democratic	November 13, 1944	Resigned to take office as judge on the United States Court of Appeals for the Ninth Circuit.
Sinclair Weeks	Massachusetts	Republican	December 19, 1944	
Monrad Wallgren	Washington	Democratic	January 9, 1945	Resigned to take office as Governor of Washington.
Harry S. Truman	Missouri	Democratic	January 17, 1945	Resigned to take office as Vice President of the United States.
Harold H. Burton	Ohio	Republican	September 30, 1945	Resigned to take office as Associate Justice of the Supreme Court of the United States.
Happy Chandler	Kentucky	Democratic	November 1, 1945	Resigned to become Commissioner of Baseball.
Warren Austin	Vermont	Republican	August 2, 1946	Resigned to take office as the United States Ambassador to the United Nations.
Hugh Mitchell	Washington	Democratic	December 25, 1946	Resigned to allow early appointment of successor.
Vera C. Bushfield	South Dakota	Republican	December 26, 1948	Resigned to allow early appointment of successor.
Alben W. Barkley	Kentucky	Democratic	January 19, 1949	Resigned to take office as Vice President of the United States.
Robert F. Wagner	New York	Democratic	June 28, 1949	Resigned for health reasons.
J. Howard McGrath	Rhode Island	Democratic	August 23, 1949	Resigned to take office as United States Attorney General.
Raymond E. Baldwin	Connecticut	Republican	December 16, 1949	Resigned to take office as an associate justice on the Connecticut Supreme Court.

== 1950 to 1999 ==
Name	State	Party	Date of resignation	Notes
Sheridan Downey	California	Democratic	November 30, 1950	Resigned for health reasons.
Ralph Brewster	Maine	Republican	December 31, 1952	Lost primary nomination to Frederick G. Payne.
Richard Nixon	California	Republican	January 1, 1953	Resigned to take office as Vice President of the United States.
Charles Daniel	South Carolina	Democratic	December 23, 1954	Resigned because Strom Thurmond won the seat.
Hazel Abel	Nebraska	Republican	December 31, 1954	Resigned to allow early appointment of successor.
Strom Thurmond	South Carolina	Democratic	April 4, 1956	Resigned to fulfill a pledge to contest a full election after first being chosen as a write-in candidate.
Price Daniel	Texas	Democratic	January 14, 1957	Resigned to take office as Governor of Texas.
John F. Kennedy	Massachusetts	Democratic	December 22, 1960	Resigned to take office as President of the United States.
Lyndon B. Johnson	Texas	Democratic	January 3, 1961	Resigned to take office as Vice President of the United States.
Hubert Humphrey	Minnesota	Democratic	December 29, 1964	Resigned to take office as Vice President of the United States.
Pierre Salinger	California	Democratic	December 31, 1964	Resigned to allow early appointment of successor.
Harry F. Byrd	Virginia	Democratic	November 10, 1965	Resigned for health reasons.
John J. Williams	Delaware	Republican	December 31, 1970	Resigned to allow early appointment of successor.
George Murphy	California	Republican	January 2, 1971	Resigned to allow early appointment of successor.
William Saxbe	Ohio	Republican	January 3, 1974	Resigned to take office as United States Attorney General.
Alan Bible	Nevada	Democratic	December 17, 1974	Resigned to allow early appointment of successor.
Wallace F. Bennett	Utah	Republican	December 20, 1974	Resigned to allow early appointment of successor.
Howard Metzenbaum	Ohio	Democratic	December 23, 1974	Resigned to allow early appointment of successor.
Marlow Cook	Kentucky	Republican	December 27, 1974	Resigned to allow early appointment of successor.
J. William Fulbright	Arkansas	Democratic	December 31, 1974	Resigned when he lost the primary nomination to Dale Bumpers.
Edward Gurney	Florida	Republican	December 31, 1974	Resigned after declining to seek re-election while under indictment in an influence peddling scandal.
Sam Ervin	North Carolina	Democratic	December 31, 1974	Resigned after multiple disputes with the Senate Democratic leadership and the Democratic National Committee.
Roman Hruska	Nebraska	Republican	December 27, 1976	Resigned to allow early appointment of successor.
Stuart Symington	Missouri	Democratic	December 27, 1976	Resigned to allow early appointment of successor.
John Pastore	Rhode Island	Democratic	December 28, 1976	Resigned to allow early appointment of successor.
Walter Mondale	Minnesota	Democratic	December 30, 1976	Resigned to take office as Vice President of the United States.
Paul Hatfield	Montana	Democratic	December 12, 1978	Resigned to allow early appointment of successor.
James B. Pearson	Kansas	Republican	December 23, 1978	Resigned to allow early appointment of successor.
James Eastland	Mississippi	Democratic	December 27, 1978	Resigned to allow early appointment of successor.
Wendell R. Anderson	Minnesota	Democratic	December 29, 1978	Resigned to allow early appointment of successor.
Clifford Hansen	Wyoming	Republican	December 31, 1978	Resigned to allow early appointment of successor.
Edmund Muskie	Maine	Democratic	May 7, 1980	Resigned to take office as United States Secretary of State.
John Durkin	New Hampshire	Democratic	December 29, 1980	Resigned to allow early appointment of successor.
Richard Stone	Florida	Democratic	December 31, 1980	Resigned to allow early appointment of successor.
Donald Stewart	Alabama	Democratic	January 2, 1981	Resigned when he lost the primary to Jim Folsom Jr.
Harrison A. Williams	New Jersey	Democratic	March 11, 1982	Resigned after conviction of bribery in the Abscam scandal ahead of a vote on his expulsion.
Nicholas F. Brady	New Jersey	Republican	December 27, 1982	Resigned to allow early appointment of successor.
Paul Tsongas	Massachusetts	Democratic	January 2, 1985	Resigned to allow early appointment of successor and for health reasons.
Dan Quayle	Indiana	Republican	January 3, 1989	Resigned to take office as Vice President of the United States.
Gordon J. Humphrey	New Hampshire	Republican	December 4, 1990	Resigned to take seat in New Hampshire Senate and to fulfill a campaign promise to only serve two terms.
Pete Wilson	California	Republican	January 7, 1991	Resigned to take office as Governor of California.
Kent Conrad	North Dakota	Democratic	December 14, 1992	Resigned after winning a special election to fill North Dakota's other Senate seat vacated by the deceased Quentin Burdick.
Al Gore	Tennessee	Democratic	January 2, 1993	Resigned to take office as Vice President of the United States.
Lloyd Bentsen	Texas	Democratic	January 20, 1993	Resigned to take office as United States Secretary of the Treasury.
David Boren	Oklahoma	Democratic	December 15, 1994	Resigned to become President of the University of Oklahoma.
Bob Packwood	Oregon	Republican	October 1, 1995	Resigned after the United States Senate Select Committee on Ethics recommended his expulsion for ethical misconduct.
Bob Dole	Kansas	Republican	June 11, 1996	Resigned to run for President of the United States.

== 2000 to present ==
Name	State	Party	Date of resignation	Notes
Phil Gramm	Texas	Republican	November 30, 2002	Resigned to allow early appointment of successor.
Frank Murkowski	Alaska	Republican	December 2, 2002	Resigned to become Governor of Alaska.
Jon Corzine	New Jersey	Democratic	January 17, 2006	Resigned to become Governor of New Jersey.
Trent Lott	Mississippi	Republican	December 18, 2007	Resigned to pursue a private-sector career.
Barack Obama	Illinois	Democratic	November 16, 2008	Resigned to take office as President of the United States.
Joe Biden	Delaware	Democratic	January 15, 2009	Resigned to take office as Vice President of the United States.
Ken Salazar	Colorado	Democratic	January 20, 2009	Resigned to become United States Secretary of the Interior.
Hillary Clinton	New York	Democratic	January 21, 2009	Resigned to become United States Secretary of State.
Mel Martínez	Florida	Republican	September 9, 2009	Resigned early after declining to seek re-election.
John Ensign	Nevada	Republican	May 3, 2011	Resigned during an investigation by the United States Senate Select Committee on Ethics into events surrounding an extramarital affair in the wake of the John Ensign scandal.
Jim DeMint	South Carolina	Republican	January 1, 2013	Resigned to become President of The Heritage Foundation.
John Kerry	Massachusetts	Democratic	February 1, 2013	Resigned to become United States Secretary of State.
Max Baucus	Montana	Democratic	February 6, 2014	Resigned to become ambassador of the United States to China.
Tom Coburn	Oklahoma	Republican	January 3, 2015	Announced on January 16, 2014 and resigned at the end of 113th Congress, so a special election to choose his successor could be held in conjunction with the regular election.
Jeff Sessions	Alabama	Republican	February 8, 2017	Resigned to become United States Attorney General.
Al Franken	Minnesota	Democratic	January 2, 2018	Resigned after allegations of sexual harassment. He said he expected that an investigation would clear him but he could not do his job and undergo investigation at the same time.
Thad Cochran	Mississippi	Republican	April 1, 2018	Resigned because of health issues.
Jon Kyl	Arizona	Republican	December 31, 2018	Resigned so that a "new appointee can begin the new term with all other Senators." Kyl was previously appointed to fill the seat left vacant by the death of John McCain.
Johnny Isakson	Georgia	Republican	December 31, 2019	Resigned because of health issues.
Kamala Harris	California	Democratic	January 18, 2021	Resigned to take office as Vice President of the United States.
Jim Inhofe	Oklahoma	Republican	January 3, 2023	Announced on February 24, 2022 and resigned at the end of the 117th Congress, so a special election to choose his successor could be held in conjunction with the regular election.
Ben Sasse	Nebraska	Republican	January 8, 2023	Announced on October 6, 2022 and resigned to become President of the University of Florida.
Bob Menendez	New Jersey	Democratic	August 20, 2024	Resigned after being convicted of acting as a foreign agent for, and taking bribes from, the governments of Egypt and Qatar.
Laphonza Butler	California	Democratic	December 8, 2024	Resigned to allow early appointment of successor.
George Helmy	New Jersey	Democratic	December 8, 2024	Resigned to allow early appointment of successor.
JD Vance	Ohio	Republican	January 10, 2025	Resigned to take office as Vice President of the United States.
Marco Rubio	Florida	Republican	January 20, 2025	Resigned to become United States Secretary of State.
Markwayne Mullin	Oklahoma	Republican	March 24, 2026	Resigned to become United States Secretary of Homeland Security.
Alan Armstrong	Oklahoma	Republican	November 30, 2026	Resigning to allow early appointment of successor.
Amy Klobuchar	Minnesota	Democratic	TBD	Resigning to become Governor of Minnesota.
Marsha Blackburn	Tennessee	Republican	TBD	Resigning to become Governor of Tennessee.
