= 1800 Vermont gubernatorial election =

- September 2, 1800
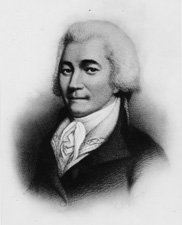

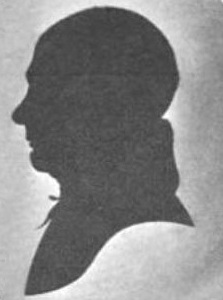
Nominee	Isaac Tichenor	Israel Smith
Party	Federalist	Democratic-Republican
Popular vote	6,444	3,239
Percentage	64.04%	32.19%
- County results Tichenor: 60–70% 70–80% 80–90% 90–100% Smith: 60–70% No Data/Vote
Governor before election
Isaac Tichenor
Federalist
Elected Governor
Isaac Tichenor
Federalist

The 1800 Vermont gubernatorial election took place on September 2, 1800. It resulted in the re-election of Isaac Tichenor to a one-year term.

The Vermont General Assembly met in Middlebury on October 9. The Vermont House of Representatives appointed a committee to examine the votes of the freemen of Vermont for governor, lieutenant governor, treasurer, and members of the governor's council.

The committee examined the votes, which showed that Isaac Tichenor was chosen for a fourth one-year term. In the election for lieutenant governor, the voters selected Paul Brigham for a fifth one-year term. No candidate for treasurer had a majority of the popular vote. In accordance with the Vermont Constitution, the General Assembly was required to make a choice. The Assembly met on October 10 and elected Benjamin Swan. Vote totals for the governor's race were reported as follows.

== Results ==
1800 Vermont gubernatorial election
Party	Candidate	Votes	%	±%
Federalist	Isaac Tichenor (incumbent)	6,444	64.04	-0.2
Democratic-Republican	Israel Smith	3,239	32.19	−1.5
Write-in		380	3.77	+1.7
Total votes		10,063	100.0	N/A
