= 1789 Vermont Republic gubernatorial election =

- September 1, 1789
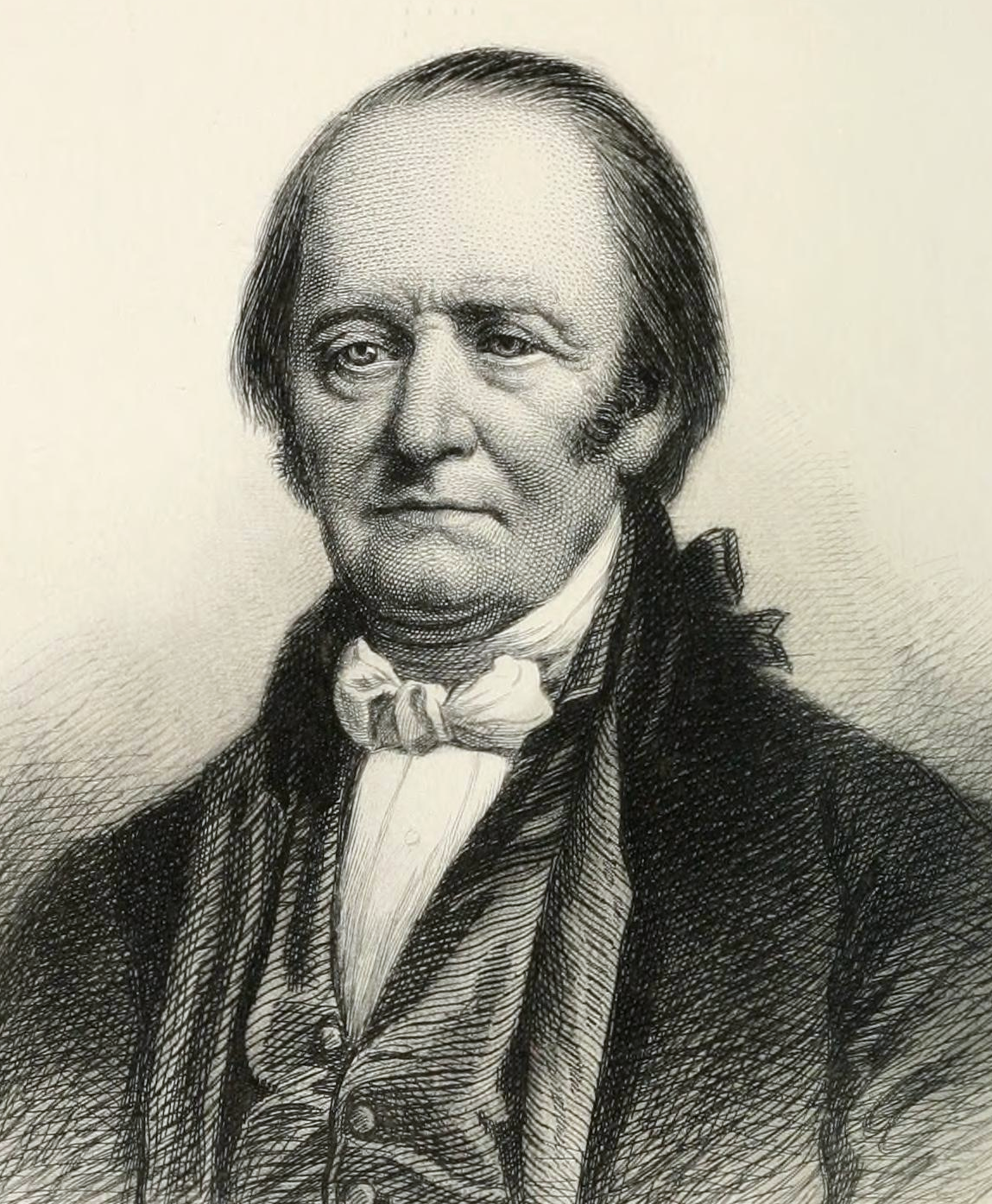

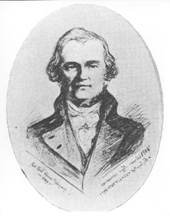
Nominee	Thomas Chittenden	Moses Robinson	Samuel Safford
Party	Independent	Independent	Independent
Popular vote	1,263	746	478
Percentage	43.34%	25.60%	16.41%
Governor before election
Thomas Chittenden
Independent
Elected Governor
Moses Robinson
Independent

The Vermont Republic gubernatorial election of 1789 took place on September 1, 1789. Though incumbent Governor Thomas Chittenden won a plurality of the popular vote over his main competitor, Vermont Supreme Court Chief Justice Moses Robinson, the Vermont Constitution required that the legislature choose if no candidate won a majority.

The Vermont General Assembly met in Westminster on October 8 to count the votes of the freemen for governor of the Republic of Vermont, lieutenant governor, treasurer, and members of the governor's council. Joseph Marsh was easily re-elected as lieutenant governor, and Samuel Mattocks was chosen for another term as treasurer.

For the first time since the founding of the Vermont Republic in 1778, Chittenden found himself in political difficulty. Shortly before the election, he had granted Ira Allen title to the town of Woodbridge (now Highgate) but had neglected to first obtain the approval of the governor's council. Chittenden was accused of malfeasance for supposedly favoring a clique led by the Allen family with respect to land grants.

As a result of the controversy, On October 9, the legislature chose Robinson, the first time Chittenden had not been elected governor. Robinson served a one-year term, but the controversy over the Woodbridge land grant abated, and Chittenden was returned to office in 1790.

== Results ==
1789 Vermont Republic gubernatorial election
Party	Candidate	Votes	%
Nonpartisan	Thomas Chittenden (incumbent)	1,263	43.34
Nonpartisan	Moses Robinson	746	25.60
Nonpartisan	Samuel Safford	478	16.41
Write-in		427	14.65
Total votes		2,914	100.0
