= Isaac Tichenor =

American judge (1754–1838)

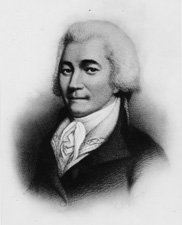

United States Senator from Vermont
- In office March 4, 1815 – March 3, 1821
- Preceded by: Jonathan Robinson
- Succeeded by: Horatio Seymour
- In office October 18, 1796 – October 17, 1797
- Preceded by: Moses Robinson
- Succeeded by: Nathaniel Chipman

3rd and 5th Governor of Vermont
- In office October 14, 1808 – October 14, 1809
- Lieutenant: Paul Brigham
- Preceded by: Israel Smith
- Succeeded by: Jonas Galusha
- In office October 16, 1797 – October 9, 1807
- Lieutenant: Paul Brigham
- Preceded by: Paul Brigham
- Succeeded by: Israel Smith

7th Speaker of the Vermont House of Representatives
- In office 1783–1784
- Preceded by: Increase Moseley
- Succeeded by: Nathaniel Niles

Personal details
- Born: February 8, 1754 Newark, Province of New Jersey, British America
- Died: December 11, 1838 (aged 84) Bennington, Vermont, U.S.
- Party: Federalist
- Spouse: Elizabeth
- Profession: Attorney; Politician; Judge

Isaac Tichenor (February 8, 1754 – December 11, 1838) was an American lawyer and politician. He served as the third and fifth governor of Vermont and United States senator from Vermont.

== Biography ==
Tichenor was born in Newark in the Province of New Jersey, the son of Susanna (Guerin) and Daniel Tichenor. He graduated from Princeton University in 1775 and moved for a short while to Schenectady, New York where he studied law. He was a descendant of Martin Tichenor (1625–1681), an early colonist and original settler of Newark, New Jersey.

== Career ==
In 1777, Tichenor moved to Bennington, Vermont and served as an Assistant Commissary General during the American Revolution. He was elected captain and commander of a Bennington militia company, which was activated for service several times in Vermont and upstate New York. He was also appointed a justice of the peace.

He was a member of the Vermont House of Representatives from 1781 to 1784 and served as Speaker of the House in 1783. He was an agent from the Vermont Republic to the Continental Congress, and presented Vermont's request for admission to the Union from 1782 to 1789.

After Vermont's admission to the Union in 1791, Tichenor ran unsuccessfully for a seat in the United States House of Representatives against Matthew Lyon and Israel Smith, receiving 29% of the vote in the first round. He ran for governor in three consecutive elections in 1793, 1794, and 1795, losing each time to Thomas Chittenden. He was an associate justice of the Vermont Supreme Court from 1791 to 1794, and Chief Justice in 1795 and 1796.

Tichenor was also active in the Vermont militia, and attained the rank of major general as commander of its 2nd Division.

In 1796 he was elected to fill the unexpired term of Moses Robinson in the United States Senate beginning on October 18, 1796. He was re-elected to a full six-year term to begin on March 4, 1797, but he resigned on October 17, 1797, when he was elected Governor of Vermont.

Tichenor was a member of the Federalist Party; when that party dominated the federal government in the 1790s many leading politicians in Vermont joined the Democratic-Republican Party and opposed a strong federal government at the national level. Despite dominating the Governor's office for a decade, Tichenor's elections reflected the decline of the Federalist Party as a whole, as he won by increasingly narrow margins. After his last consecutive victory in 1806, he lost in 1807, won narrowly in 1808, and lost in 1809, 1810, and 1817 by increasing margins.

In 1815, Tichenor returned to the United States Senate, where he served until 1821. By the end of his term the Federalist Party had ceased to exist.

== Death ==
After completing his Senate term, Tichenor lived in retirement in Bennington. He died in Bennington on December 11, 1838, and was interred at Bennington Village Cemetery. He was the last surviving Governor to have served in the 18th century.

Party political offices
First	Federalist nominee for Governor of Vermont; 1797, 1798, 1799, 1800, 1801, 1802, 1803, 1804, 1805, 1806, 1807, 1808, 1809, 1810	Succeeded by Martin Chittenden
Preceded by Samuel Strong	Federalist nominee for Governor of Vermont; 1817	Succeeded by None
Political offices
Preceded by Paul Brigham	Governor of Vermont; 1797–1807	Succeeded by Israel Smith
Preceded by Israel Smith	Governor of Vermont; 1808–1809	Succeeded by Jonas Galusha
U.S. Senate
Preceded by Moses Robinson	U.S. senator (Class 1) from Vermont; October 18, 1796 – October 17, 1797; Served alongside: Elijah Paine	Succeeded by Nathaniel Chipman
Preceded by Jonathan Robinson	U.S. senator (Class 1) from Vermont; March 4, 1815 – March 3, 1821; Served alongside: Dudley Chase, James Fisk, William A. Palmer	Succeeded by Horatio Seymour
