= 1808 Vermont gubernatorial election =

- September 6, 1808
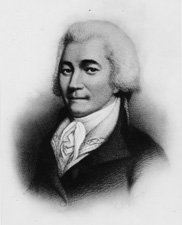

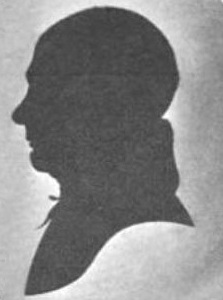
Nominee	Isaac Tichenor	Israel Smith
Party	Federalist	Democratic-Republican
Popular vote	13,634	12,775
Percentage	50.81%	47.60%
- County results Tichenor: 50–60% 60–70% 80–90% Smith: 50–60% 60–70%
Governor before election
Israel Smith
Democratic-Republican
Elected Governor
Isaac Tichenor
Federalist

The 1808 Vermont gubernatorial election took place on September 6, 1808. It resulted in the election of Isaac Tichenor to a one-year term.

The Vermont General Assembly met in Montpelier on October 13. The Vermont House of Representatives appointed a committee to examine the votes of the freemen of Vermont for governor, lieutenant governor, treasurer, and members of the governor's council.

The committee's examination of the votes showed that former Governor Isaac Tichenor defeated incumbent Israel Smith for a one-year term. In the election for lieutenant governor, the voters selected Paul Brigham for his thirteenth one-year term. Benjamin Swan was elected to a one-year term as treasurer, his ninth.

In the races for lieutenant governor and treasurer, the vote totals and names of other candidates were not recorded. In the race for governor, a contemporary newspaper article reported the results as follows.

== Results ==
1808 Vermont gubernatorial election
Party	Candidate	Votes	%
Federalist	Isaac Tichenor	13,634	50.81
Democratic-Republican	Israel Smith (incumbent)	12,775	47.60
Write-in		427	1.59
Total votes		26,836	100.0
