= 1803 Vermont gubernatorial election =

- September 6, 1803
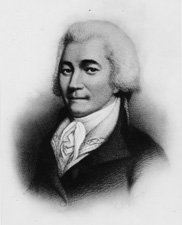
Nominee	Isaac Tichenor	Jonathan Robinson
Party	Federalist	Democratic-Republican
Popular vote	7,940	5,408
Percentage	57.98%	39.49%
Governor before election
Isaac Tichenor
Federalist
Elected Governor
Isaac Tichenor
Federalist

The 1803 Vermont gubernatorial election took place on September 6, 1803. It resulted in the re-election of Isaac Tichenor to a one-year term.

The Vermont General Assembly met in Westminster on October 13. The Vermont House of Representatives appointed a committee to examine the votes of the freemen of Vermont for governor, lieutenant governor, treasurer, and members of the governor's council.

The committee examined the votes, which showed that Isaac Tichenor was chosen for a seventh one-year term. In the election for lieutenant governor, the voters selected Paul Brigham for an eighth one-year term. Benjamin Swan was elected to a fourth one-year term as treasurer. According to contemporary newspaper accounts, the vote totals for governor were as follows.

In the race for lieutenant governor, the vote totals were reported as: Paul Brigham, 7,700; Thomas Leverett, 2,803; Lewis R. Morris, 153; Scattering, 414.

The results for treasurer were: Benjamin Swan, 8,328; Scattering, 353.

== Results ==
1803 Vermont gubernatorial election
Party	Candidate	Votes	%
Federalist	Isaac Tichenor (incumbent)	7,940	57.98
Democratic-Republican	Jonathan Robinson	5,408	39.49
Write-in		346	2.53
Total votes		13,694	100.0
