= 1807 Vermont gubernatorial election =

- September 1, 1807
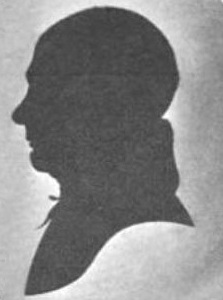

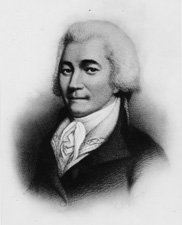
Nominee	Israel Smith	Isaac Tichenor
Party	Democratic-Republican	Federalist
Popular vote	9,903	8,571
Percentage	53.61%	46.39%
- County results Smith: 50–60% 60–70% Tichenor: 50–60% 60–70% 70–80%
Governor before election
Isaac Tichenor
Federalist
Elected Governor
Israel Smith
Democratic-Republican

The 1807 Vermont gubernatorial election took place on September 1, 1807. It resulted in the election of Israel Smith to a one-year term.

The Vermont General Assembly met in Woodstock on October 8. The Vermont House of Representatives appointed a committee to examine the votes of the freemen of Vermont for governor, lieutenant governor, treasurer, and members of the governor's council.

The committee's examination of the votes showed that Israel Smith defeated incumbent Isaac Tichenor for a one-year term. In the election for lieutenant governor, the voters selected Paul Brigham for his twelfth one-year term. Benjamin Swan was elected to a one-year term as treasurer, his eighth.

In the races for lieutenant governor and treasurer, the vote totals and names of other candidates were not recorded. In the race for governor, a contemporary newspaper article reported the results as follows.

== Results ==
1807 Vermont gubernatorial election
Party	Candidate	Votes	%
Democratic-Republican	Israel Smith	9,903	53.61
Federalist	Isaac Tichenor (incumbent)	8,571	46.39
Total votes		18,474	100.0
