= 1798 Vermont gubernatorial election =

- September 4, 1798
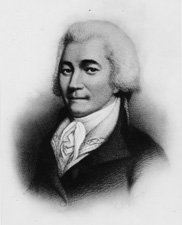

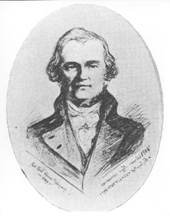
Nominee	Isaac Tichenor	Moses Robinson
Party	Federalist	Democratic-Republican
Popular vote	6,211	2,805
Percentage	66.44%	30.01%
- County results Tichenor: 60–70% 70–80% 80–90% 90–100% Robinson: 50–60% 70–80% No Data/Vote
Governor before election
Isaac Tichenor
Federalist
Elected Governor
Isaac Tichenor
Federalist

The 1798 Vermont gubernatorial election took place on September 4, 1798. It resulted in the re-election of Isaac Tichenor to a one-year term.

The Vermont General Assembly met in Vergennes on October 11. The Vermont House of Representatives appointed a committee to examine the votes of the freemen of Vermont for governor, lieutenant governor, treasurer, and members of the governor's council.

In the popular election, Isaac Tichenor was chosen for a second one-year term. In the election for lieutenant governor, the voters selected Paul Brigham for a third one-year term. The freemen also re-elected Samuel Mattocks as treasurer, his twelfth one-year term. Vote totals were reported in local newspapers as follows.

== Results ==
1798 Vermont gubernatorial election
Party	Candidate	Votes	%
Federalist	Isaac Tichenor (incumbent)	6,211	66.44
Democratic-Republican	Moses Robinson	2,805	30.01
Write-in		332	3.55
Total votes		9,348	100.0
