= 1802 Vermont gubernatorial election =

- September 7, 1802
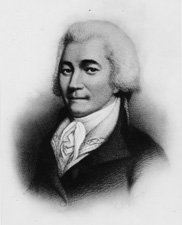

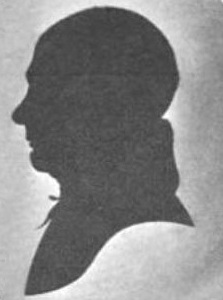
Nominee	Isaac Tichenor	Israel Smith
Party	Federalist	Democratic-Republican
Popular vote	7,823	5,085
Percentage	59.77%	38.85%
Governor before election
Isaac Tichenor
Federalist
Elected Governor
Isaac Tichenor
Federalist

The 1802 Vermont gubernatorial election took place on September 7, 1802. It resulted in the re-election of Isaac Tichenor to a one-year term.

The Vermont General Assembly met in Burlington on October 14. The Vermont House of Representatives appointed a committee to examine the votes of the freemen of Vermont for governor, lieutenant governor, treasurer, and members of the governor's council.

The committee examined the votes, which showed that Isaac Tichenor was chosen for a sixth one-year term. In the election for lieutenant governor, the voters selected Paul Brigham for a seventh one-year term. Benjamin Swan was elected to a third one-year term as treasurer. According to contemporary newspaper accounts, the vote totals for governor were as follows.

In the race for lieutenant governor, the vote totals were reported as: Paul Brigham, 7,184; Arad Hunt, 2,249; Zebina Curtis, 252; Scattering, 465.

== Results ==
1802 Vermont gubernatorial election
Party	Candidate	Votes	%
Federalist	Isaac Tichenor (incumbent)	7,823	59.77
Democratic-Republican	Israel Smith	5,085	38.85
Write-in		181	1.38
Total votes		13,089	100.0
