= 1790 Vermont Republic gubernatorial election =

- September 7, 1790
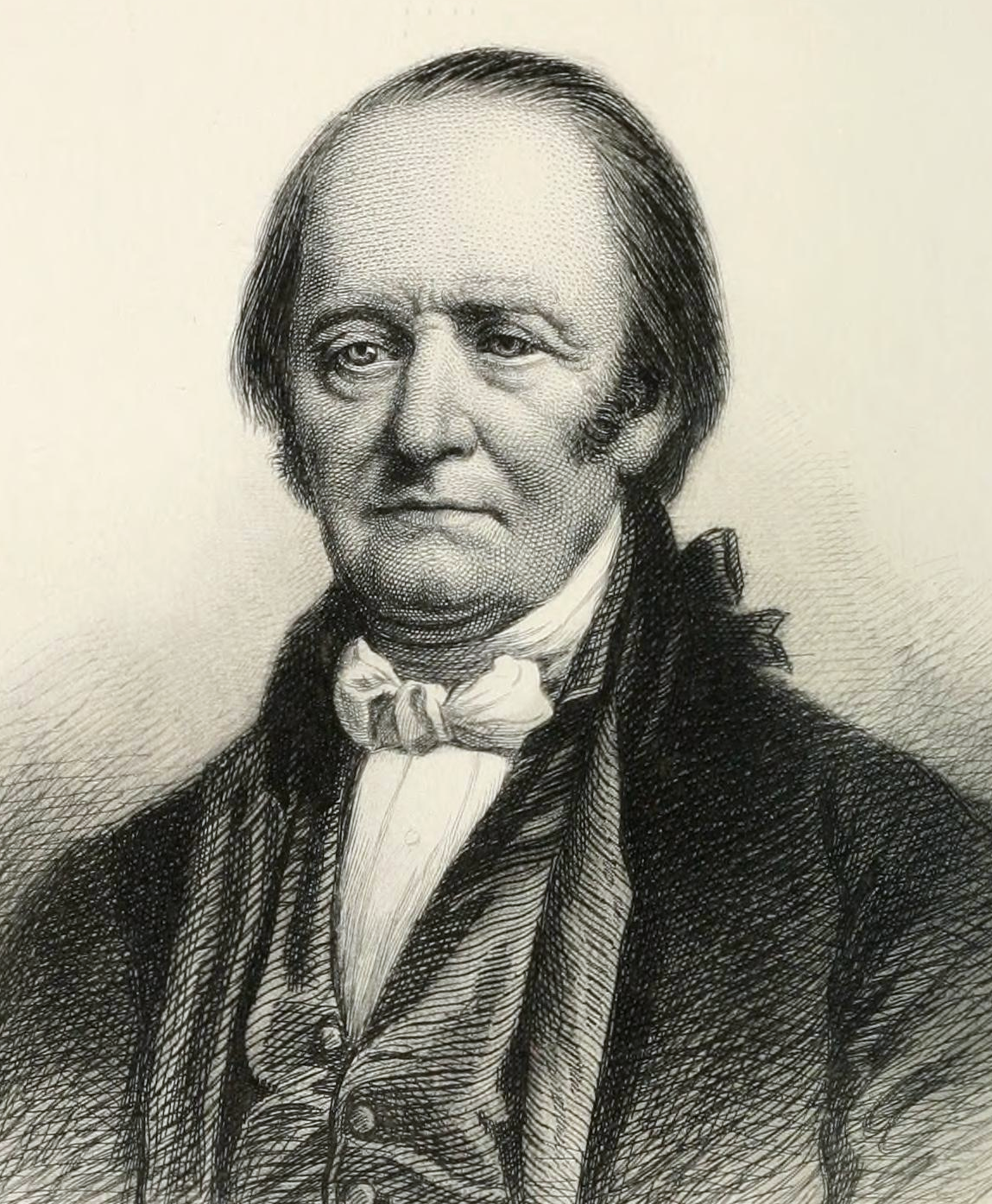
Nominee	Thomas Chittenden
Party	Independent
Governor before election
Moses Robinson
Independent
Elected Governor
Thomas Chittenden
Independent

The 1790 Vermont Republic gubernatorial election took place on September 7, 1790. It resulted in the re-election of former Governor Thomas Chittenden to a one-year term.

The Vermont General Assembly met in Castleton on October 14. The Vermont House of Representatives appointed a committee to examine the votes of the freemen of Vermont for governor, lieutenant governor, treasurer, and members of the governor's council. In the race for governor, Thomas Chittenden, who had served from 1778 until losing re-election to Moses Robinson in 1789, won re-election.

In the election for lieutenant governor, incumbent Joseph Marsh indicated in August that he would not be a candidate for reelection. No candidate obtained a majority of the popular vote. On October 15, the legislature elected Peter Olcott to a one-year term.

The freemen re-elected Samuel Mattocks as treasurer, his fourth one-year term. The names of candidates and balloting totals for statewide offices were not recorded. According to an article in the Vermont Gazette, Chittenden's majority was over 1,300 votes.

This was the final gubernatorial election in the independent republic of Vermont, because Vermont was admitted to the Union as the 14th state on March 4, 1791.

== Results ==
1790 Vermont Republic gubernatorial election
Party	Candidate	Votes	%
Nonpartisan	Thomas Chittenden (incumbent)	**	**
