= 1806 Vermont gubernatorial election =

- September 2, 1806
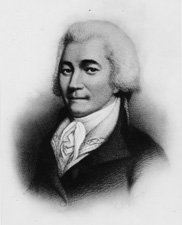
Nominee	Isaac Tichenor	Jonathan Robinson
Party	Federalist	Democratic-Republican
Popular vote	8,351	6,930
Percentage	53.53%	44.42%
Governor before election
Isaac Tichenor
Federalist
Elected Governor
Isaac Tichenor
Federalist

The 1806 Vermont gubernatorial election took place on September 2, 1806. It resulted in the re-election of Isaac Tichenor to a one-year term.

The Vermont General Assembly met in Middlebury on October 9. The Vermont House of Representatives appointed a committee to examine the votes of the freemen of Vermont for governor, lieutenant governor, treasurer, and members of the governor's council.

The committee's examination of the votes showed that Governor Isaac Tichenor was chosen for a tenth one-year term. In the election for lieutenant governor, the voters selected Paul Brigham for an eleventh one-year term. Benjamin Swan was elected to his seventh one-year term as treasurer.

In the races for lieutenant governor and treasurer, the vote totals and names of other candidates were not recorded. According to a contemporary newspaper report, the vote totals for governor were as follows.

== Results ==
1806 Vermont gubernatorial election
Party	Candidate	Votes	%
Federalist	Isaac Tichenor (incumbent)	8,351	53.53
Democratic-Republican	Jonathan Robinson	6,930	44.42
Write-in		320	2.05
Total votes		15,601	100.0
