= Blanc F. Joubert =

Politician in Louisiana (1816–1885)

Blanc François Joubert (1816–1885) was a politician in Louisiana. He was from a long line of freemen.

In 1872, he testified in a congressional investigation. He served as a tax assessor in New Orleans.

His family members litigated whether they were Black.
