= Brigham Hill Historic District =

Historic district in Vermont, United States

- U.S. National Register of Historic Places
- U.S. Historic district
- Location within Vermont Location within the United States
- Location: 929-987 Union Village, 18 Pattrell & 694 Goodrich Four Corners Rds., Norwich, Vermont
- Coordinates: 43°44′1″N 72°19′18″W
- Area: 32 acres (13 ha)
- Architectural style: Federal
- NRHP reference No.: 100005025
- Added to NRHP: March 5, 2020

The Brigham Hill Historic District encompasses a rural 19th-century landscape in central Norwich, Vermont. It includes three late 18th or early 19th century farmsteads, all associated with the Brigham family, whose progenitor, Paul Brigham, was prominent in Vermont politics. It was listed on the National Register of Historic Places in 2020.

== Description and history ==
The town of Norwich was chartered in 1761 and settled the following decade. The Brigham Hill area was first settled by Elihu Baxter, who sold 100 acres (40 ha) to Paul Brigham, a native of Connecticut. Brigham settled on the land the following year, and built a new house on the land in 1788. Brigham was prominent in local and state affairs, serving as the state's first lieutenant governor after it gained statehood. Two of Brigham's sons built houses on land subdivided from the original land, and continued the family farming activity. Five generations of Brighams worked the land in this area, finally selling it off in the 1930s.

The district covers 32 acres (13 ha), centered on the junction of Brigham Hill Road with Tilden Hill Road. Included in this area is open pasture and farmland, three early farmhouses, a c. 1800 English barn, and a bank barn built about 1870. Although the street-facing facades of the houses have been relatively little altered, the rear and sides of the houses have undergone some alterations for modern uses. The Paul Brigham House at 211 Brigham Hill Road, is noted for a particularly fine interior, executed by local craftsman Perez Jones.

== See also ==
- National Register of Historic Places listings in Windsor County, Vermont
