= John Strong (Vermont politician) =

American politician

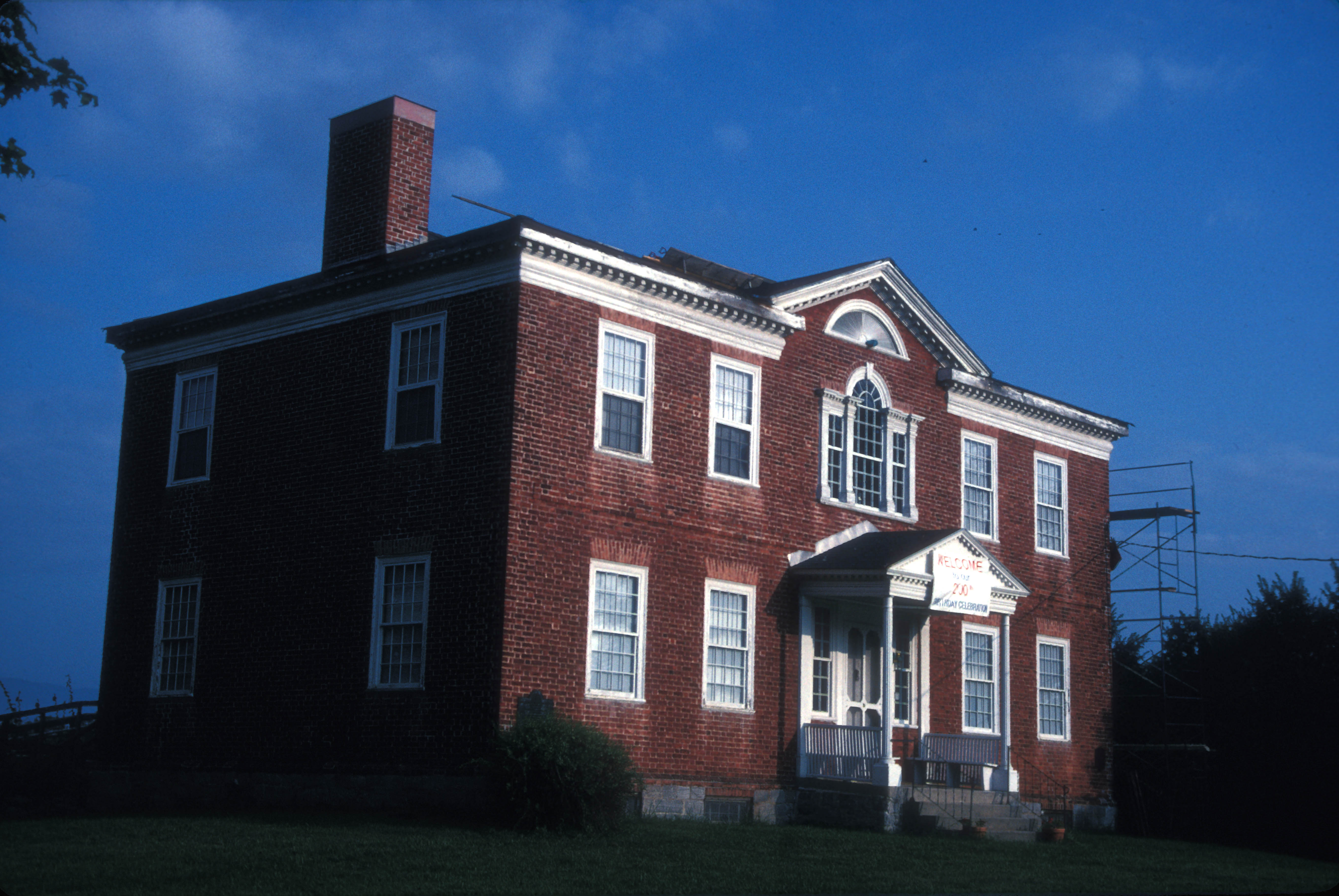
John Strong Mansion Museum

John Strong (August 16, 1738 – June 16, 1816) was an early Vermont farmer, militia officer and government leader who served as Speaker of the Vermont House of Representatives.

== Biography ==
John Strong was born in Salisbury, Connecticut on August 16, 1738. In 1766 he settled in Addison, Vermont as one of its first white settlers.

Active in the militia in Connecticut during the French and Indian War and Vermont during the Revolution, and continuing his military service after the Revolution, Strong eventually attained the rank of Brigadier General.

During the Revolutionary War Strong was captured by the British, was paroled, and relocated his family to Dorset, and he represented that town in the Vermont House of Representatives from 1779 to 1782. From 1781 to 1782 he served as Assistant Judge of Bennington County.

In 1783 he returned to Addison, and he represented that town in the Vermont House from 1784 to 1787, serving as Speaker in 1786.

Strong was elected Judge of the Addison County Court in 1785, and from 1786 to 1801 he served as Judge of Probate and member of the Governor's Council. In 1791 Strong was a member of the convention that ratified the U.S. Constitution and resulted in statehood for Vermont.

In the 1790s Strong built a home in Addison to replace his original dwelling, which had been destroyed by the British during John Burgoyne's advance from Canada during the Revolution. This home, the General John Strong Mansion, is a museum operated by the Vermont chapter of Daughters of the American Revolution.

In 1801 Strong retired from active pursuits as the result of failing health. He died in Addison on June 16, 1816, and is buried in West Addison's Lake View Cemetery.

Strong's children included Samuel Strong, a militia officer who served as mayor of Vergennes.

Political offices
Preceded by Stephen R. Bradley	Speaker of the Vermont House of Representatives; 1786–1786	Succeeded by Gideon Olin
