= Stephen R. Bradley =

American judge and politician

Stephen Row Bradley
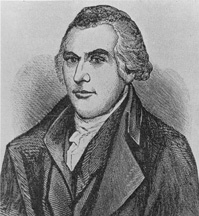

President pro tempore of the United States Senate
- In office December 28, 1808 – January 8, 1809
- Preceded by: Samuel Smith
- Succeeded by: John Milledge
- In office December 14, 1802 – October 16, 1803
- Preceded by: Abraham Baldwin
- Succeeded by: John Brown

United States Senator from Vermont
- In office October 15, 1801 – March 3, 1813
- Preceded by: Elijah Paine
- Succeeded by: Dudley Chase
- In office October 17, 1791 – March 3, 1795
- Preceded by: (none)
- Succeeded by: Elijah Paine

9th Speaker of the Vermont House of Representatives
- In office 1785–1786
- Preceded by: Nathaniel Niles
- Succeeded by: John Strong

Personal details
- Born: February 20, 1754 Cheshire, Connecticut, British America
- Died: December 9, 1830 (aged 76) Walpole, New Hampshire, U.S.
- Resting place: Westminster Cemetery; Westminster, Vermont
- Party: Anti-Administration; Democratic-Republican
- Spouse(s): Merab Atwater Bradley; Gratia Thankful Taylor Bradley; Belinda Willard Bradley
- Children: William Czar Bradley
- Education: Yale
- Profession: Lawyer; Judge; Politician

Stephen Row Bradley (February 20, 1754 – December 9, 1830) was an American lawyer, judge and politician. He served as a United States Senator from the state of Vermont and as the President pro tempore of the United States Senate during the early 1800s.

== Early life ==
Bradley was born on February 20, 1754, in the part of Wallingford, Connecticut that is now Cheshire. He was the son of Moses and Mary (Row) Bradley. He was the grandson of Stephen Bradley, a New Haven silversmith who was one of six brothers who served in Cromwell's Ironsides before emigrating to America.

Bradley graduated from Yale College in 1775.

After his graduation, Bradley was commissioned as captain in the Connecticut Militia and rose to the rank of major. He commanded the Cheshire Volunteers and in December 1776, he served as adjutant. He was promoted to vendue master (auctioneer of seized enemy and Loyalist property) and quartermaster, and then served as aide-de-camp to General Wooster during the British attack on Danbury on April 27, 1777 when Wooster was fatally wounded. Bradley resigned his commission after the battle.

He received a Master of Arts degree from Yale in 1778. In 1779, he moved to Westminster, Vermont and studied law, directed by Tapping Reeve, founder of the Litchfield Law School. Bradley was admitted to the bar in 1779 and began the practice of law in Westminster, becoming an important citizen of the town. In October 1779, the Legislature selected him as one of five agents to the U.S. Congress from Vermont; in early 1780, he wrote a tract entitled Vermont's Appeal to a Candid and Impartial World, which defended Vermont's right to independence against competing claims by New York, New Hampshire, and Massachusetts.

== Political career ==
In June 1780, Bradley was appointed state's attorney for Cumberland County, Vermont. He held the positions of register of probate and town clerk, and in 1783 he served as county judge. He also served for seven years in the Vermont House of Representatives in the 1780s. He was speaker of the Vermont House of Representatives during 1785.

Bradley continued to be given additional responsibility in the militia. Appointed a first lieutenant in August 1780, he was promoted to colonel as commander of the 1st Regiment in October. He was later promoted to brigadier general as commander of the 8th Brigade, and served until 1791.

He served as judge of the Vermont Superior Court during the 1780s, and of the Vermont Supreme Court in 1788. Bradley was instrumental in settling Vermont's boundary disputes with New Hampshire. Vermont became part of the United States on March 4, 1791. Bradley and Moses Robinson were elected by the state legislature to be the first to fill Vermont's two senate seats. In 1791, he entered the United States Senate and supported the anti-administration faction. Defeated for reelection in 1794, he returned to Westminster and was active in law and local politics, serving on the town council.

Bradley tried to return to the U.S. Senate in 1800 and lost to incumbent Elijah Paine. However, when Paine resigned after being appointed as a judge the following year, Bradley ran for the open seat and won against William Chamberlain. He served as president pro tempore of the Senate from the end of 1801 to near the end of 1802. After he was reelected in 1807, he served as the presiding officer again for a couple of weeks in the 1808-1809 period.

Bradley is credited with writing the Twelfth Amendment to the United States Constitution, which was passed by Congress in 1803 and ratified in 1804. Although a Democratic-Republican, he was opposed to the War of 1812.

After retiring from the Senate in 1813, he retired from politics and returned to Westminster. He lived there for five years, and in 1818 he moved to Walpole, New Hampshire where he lived for the rest of his life. His Walpole house is listed on the National Register of Historic Places.

== Death ==
Bradley died in Walpole, Cheshire County, New Hampshire, on December 9, 1830 (aged 76 years, 292 days). His body was returned to Westminster, Vermont and he is interred at the Westminster Cemetery.

== Personal life ==
Known as an intelligent and eccentric man, Bradley was a good lawyer and orator. Appointed a fellow by Middlebury College on September 1, 1800, he held the position for the rest of his life. Middlebury and Dartmouth colleges awarded him the honorary degree of LL.D.

Bradley married Merab Atwater on May 16, 1780. After her death, he married Gratia Thankful Taylor on April 12, 1789. He married a third time, on September 18, 1803, to Belinda Willard. He had five children, and over a dozen grandchildren. His three daughters married prominent men, one of whom was Samuel Tudor. His son William Czar Bradley, also a politician, served several terms in Congress.

Political offices
Preceded by Nathaniel Niles	Speaker of the Vermont House of Representatives; 1785–1786	Succeeded by John Strong
U.S. Senate
Preceded by None	U.S. senator (Class 3) from Vermont; 1791–1795; Served alongside: Moses Robinson	Succeeded by Elijah Paine
Preceded by Elijah Paine	U.S. senator (Class 3) from Vermont; 1801–1813; Served alongside: Nathaniel Chipman, Israel Smith, Jonathan Robinson	Succeeded by Dudley Chase
Political offices
Preceded by Abraham Baldwin	President pro tempore of the United States Senate; December 14, 1802 – October 16, 1803	Succeeded by John Brown
Preceded by Samuel Smith	President pro tempore of the United States Senate; December 28, 1808 – January 8, 1809	Succeeded by John Milledge
