= Jonathan Robinson (American politician) =

American judge (1756–1819)

United States Senator from Vermont
- In office October 10, 1807 – March 3, 1815
- Preceded by: Israel Smith
- Succeeded by: Isaac Tichenor

Chief Judge of the Vermont Supreme Court
- In office 1801–1807
- Preceded by: Enoch Woodbridge
- Succeeded by: Royall Tyler

Judge of Probate for the Bennington district
- In office 1815–1818
- Preceded by: Solomon Wright
- Succeeded by: David Fay
- In office 1800–1801
- Preceded by: Timothy Follett
- Succeeded by: Josiah Wright
- In office 1795–1798
- Preceded by: Nathaniel Brush
- Succeeded by: Timothy Follett

Member of the Vermont House of Representatives from Bennington
- In office 1818–1819
- Preceded by: Aaron Robinson
- Succeeded by: Moses Robinson
- In office 1797–1802
- Preceded by: Elijah Dewey
- Succeeded by: Moses Robinson
- In office 1789–1796
- Preceded by: Elijah Dewey
- Succeeded by: Elijah Dewey

Personal details
- Born: August 11, 1756 Hardwick, Massachusetts
- Died: November 3, 1819 (aged 63) Bennington, Vermont, US
- Resting place: Old Bennington Cemetery, Bennington, Vermont
- Party: Democratic-Republican
- Spouse: Mary Fassett Robinson
- Children: 4
- Profession: Attorney

Jonathan Robinson (August 11, 1756 – November 3, 1819) was an American politician, lawyer, and judge from the state of Vermont who served as chief justice of the Vermont Supreme Court and a United States senator.

== Early life ==
Robinson was born in Hardwick, Massachusetts, on August 11, 1756, a son of Samuel Robinson and Mercy (Leonard) Robinson. He was raised in Hardwick, and in 1761 he moved with his family to Bennington, in what would later become Vermont but was then governed as part of New Hampshire – the New Hampshire Grants. Robinson's father was an important leader in the New Hampshire Grants, and died while in England attempting to resolve a dispute over whether New Hampshire or New York had the right to grant land and town charters.

After moving to Bennington, Robinson was educated locally, then served in the militia during the American Revolution. He served as a private and corporal in the company commanded by Joseph Safford, which was part of the regiment commanded by Ebenezer Walbridge. Safford's company was mobilized in May 1779, November 1780, August 1781, and August 1782. Robinson later went into business as the proprietor of the State Arms House tavern, which was located where the Bennington Battle Monument now stands. He later decided to study law, and he was admitted to the bar in 1796.

== Career ==
Robinson was a longtime holder of local and state office, and became identified with the Democratic-Republican Party at its founding. In addition to terms as a Bennington justice of the peace and member of the board of selectmen, among the offices in which he served were: member of the Vermont House of Representatives (1789–1796, 1797–1802, 1818–1819); Bennington town clerk (1795–1801); judge of probate for the Bennington district (1795–1798, 1800–1801, 1815–1818); and chief judge of the Vermont Supreme Court (1801–1807).

In addition to his business, legal, and political careers, Robinson was also active in the Vermont Militia; in April 1787, he was appointed a major in the militia's 1st Brigade. In August 1787, he was assigned as the brigade's judge advocate.

In each year from 1803 to 1806, Robinson was the Democratic-Republican nominee for governor, and lost each time to Isaac Tichenor. In 1807, Robinson was elected to the United States Senate, filling the unexpired term of Israel Smith, who had resigned. He was elected to a full term in 1809 and served until retiring after the end of his term in 1815.

== Awards ==
In 1790, Robinson received the honorary degree of Bachelor of Science from Dartmouth College. In 1803, Dartmouth awarded Robinson an honorary Master of Arts.

== Death and burial ==
Robinson died on November 3, 1819, in Bennington, Vermont. He is interred at the Old Bennington Cemetery in Bennington.

== Family ==
Robinson was the husband of Mary (Fassett) Robinson. They were the parents of four children: Jonathan Edwards, Mary, Henry, and Isaac Tichenor. Mary Robinson was the wife of Orsamus Cook Merrill.

Robinson's brother Moses Robinson served as governor during the Vermont Republic as a U.S. senator. Brother David Robinson was a major general in the Vermont Militia and U.S. Marshal for Vermont. Brother Samuel was a colonel in the militia and served as Speaker of the Vermont House of Representatives.

== Attempt to locate portrait ==
Robinson is one of approximately 45 U.S. senators for whom the Senate's photo historian has no likeness. Attempts to locate one have proved unsuccessful.

== See also ==
- Politics of the United States

Party political offices
Preceded by Israel Smith	Democratic-Republican nominee for Governor of Vermont; 1803, 1804, 1805,	Succeeded by Israel Smith
U.S. Senate
Preceded by Israel Smith	U.S. senator (Class 1) from Vermont; 1807–1815; Served alongside: Stephen R. Bradley, Dudley Chase	Succeeded by Isaac Tichenor
