= Moses Robinson =

American politician (1741–1813)

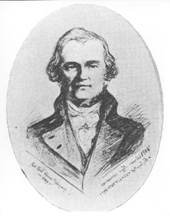

Member of the Vermont House of Representatives
- In office 1802–1803
- Preceded by: Jonathan Robinson
- Succeeded by: Nathan Robinson
- Constituency: Bennington

United States Senator from Vermont
- In office October 17, 1791 – October 15, 1796
- Preceded by: None (position created)
- Succeeded by: Isaac Tichenor

2nd Governor of the Vermont Republic
- In office October 13, 1789 – October 20, 1790
- Lieutenant: Joseph Marsh
- Preceded by: Thomas Chittenden
- Succeeded by: Thomas Chittenden

Chief Judge of the Vermont Supreme Court
- In office 1785–1788
- Preceded by: Paul Spooner
- Succeeded by: Nathaniel Chipman
- In office 1782–1783
- Preceded by: Elisha Payne
- Succeeded by: Paul Spooner
- In office 1778–1780
- Preceded by: None (position created)
- Succeeded by: Elisha Payne

Personal details
- Born: March 22, 1741 Hardwick, Massachusetts
- Died: May 26, 1813 (aged 72) Bennington, Vermont
- Resting place: Old Bennington Cemetery, Bennington, Vermont
- Party: Anti-Administration; Democratic-Republican
- Spouses: Mary Fay; Susannah Howe
- Relations: Jonathan Robinson (brother); Samuel Robinson (brother); John S. Robinson (grandson)
- Children: 6
- Occupation: Farmer; Land speculator

Military service
- Allegiance: Vermont Republic
- Service: Vermont Militia
- Years of service: 1776–1781
- Rank: Colonel
- Unit: Vermont Council of Safety
- Commands: Moses Robinson's Regiment
- Wars: American Revolutionary War: Battle of Bennington

Moses Robinson (March 22, 1741 – May 26, 1813) was a Vermonter and later American politician. When Vermont was an independent republic, he was its first chief justice and served a one-year term as governor. As governor, he superintended the negotiations that led to Vermont's admission to the Union as the fourteenth state in the United States. He then served as one of the first two United States senators from Vermont.

== Biography ==
Robinson was born in Hardwick, Massachusetts, a son of Samuel Robinson (1707–1767) and Mercy (Leonard) Robinson (1714–1793). He was raised in Hardwick, and in 1761 he moved with his family to Bennington, in what would later become Vermont but was then governed as part of New Hampshire – the New Hampshire Grants. His father was an important leader in the New Hampshire Grants, and died while in England attempting to resolve a dispute over whether New Hampshire or New York had the right to grant land and town charters there.

Moses Robinson soon became an important citizen of Bennington in his own right, serving as town clerk from 1762 to 1781. He farmed and speculated in land, and became active in the American independence movement, serving as a colonel in the Vermont militia during the American Revolution.

== Career ==
In 1778, when the government of Vermont was erected after Vermont declared independence in 1777, Robinson became a member of the governor's council and chief justice of the Vermont Supreme Court. In 1782 he was sent to the Continental Congress as a state agent to attempt to solve the ongoing governance dispute with New York. He served on the governor's council until 1785 and as chief justice until 1789, when he became governor of Vermont, replacing Thomas Chittenden. Robinson served as governor until October 1790, almost five months before Vermont was admitted as a state to the United States, and was succeeded by Chittenden.

In 1789 Robinson received the honorary degree of Master of Arts from Yale University, and in 1790 he received the same honor from Dartmouth College.

After Vermont's admission to the Union in 1791, Robinson was elected by the Vermont General Assembly to one of Vermont's two United States Senate seats. He served in the Senate for five years of his six-year term, from October 17, 1791, to October 15, 1796, when he resigned. He became associated with the anti-administration faction and, later in his term, with the beginnings of the Democratic-Republican Party of Thomas Jefferson. He was the Democratic-Republican nominee in the 1797 and 1798 gubernatorial elections, losing both times to Federalist Isaac Tichenor.

After his retirement from the Senate, Robinson moved back to Bennington and resumed farming and land speculation. He served in the Vermont House of Representatives in 1802.

== Death ==
Robinson died in Bennington and is interred at the Old Bennington Cemetery.

== Family ==
Robinson married Mary Fay, daughter of Stephen Fay, a leader of Green Mountain Boys, and sister of Joseph Fay and David Fay. They had six sons. His second wife, after Mary's death, was Susanah Howe.

Robinson was the older brother of Jonathan Robinson and Samuel Robinson, who were also prominent in Vermont's political history. Governor John S. Robinson was the son of Nathan Robinson and the grandson of Moses Robinson.

Party political offices
First	Anti-Federalist nominee for Governor of Vermont; 1789, 1790	Succeeded by None
First	Democratic-Republican nominee for Governor of Vermont; 1797, 1798	Succeeded by Israel Smith
U.S. Senate
Preceded by none – first in line	U.S. Senator (Class 1) from Vermont; 1791—1796	Succeeded by Isaac Tichenor
Political offices
Preceded by Thomas Chittenden	Governor of Vermont Republic; 1789—1790	Succeeded by Thomas Chittenden
