= Noah Smith (judge) =

American judge (1756–1812)

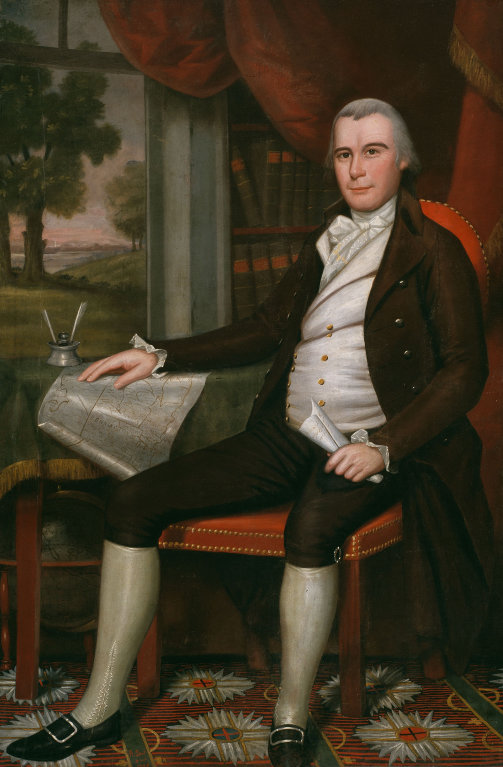
1798 portrait by Ralph Earl. Original oil on canvas, 64 1/4 x 42 1/4 inches. Part of the collections of the Art Institute of Chicago.

Noah Smith (January 27, 1756 – December 25, 1812) was a political and legal figure in Vermont during its years as an independent republic and its early years of statehood. Among the offices he held was Justice of the Vermont Supreme Court from 1789 to 1791 and 1798 to 1801.

== Biography ==
The brother of Israel Smith, who served as governor, Congressman, and United States Senator, Noah Smith was born in Suffield, Connecticut on January 27, 1756. The son of Daniel Smith and Anna Kent, he graduated from Yale University in 1778 and studied law. He then moved to Vermont, which at the time was an independent republic; in 1779, Smith and Stephen Row Bradley became the first two attorneys admitted to the Vermont bar. The American Revolution was taking place when Smith moved to Vermont, and after becoming a resident of Bennington he was appointed a paymaster of Vermont troops with the rank of captain. During the war, he also served as one of the agents empowered to negotiate with the Continental Congress concerning Vermont's application for statehood; the agents were unsuccessful during the war, but Vermont was admitted as the 14th state in 1791.

Smith served for several years as state's attorney of the provisional Cumberland County, and later as state's attorney for Bennington County. He was clerk of Bennington County’s court from 1781 to 1784, and a member of the Vermont House of Representatives in 1787.

In 1788, Smith was elected to the governor's council, and he served until resigning to return to the bench. In 1789, Smith was appointed a justice of the Vermont Supreme Court, and he served until 1791. When Vermont joined the union in 1791, Smith he was named Vermont’s first federal collector of customs, a post he held for several years while continuing to practice law.

Smith was later one of the first settlers of the town of Milton, and was responsible for construction of the many of its first businesses and its Congregational church. He also served in local office including justice of the peace and town meeting moderator. In 1798 he was again appointed to the Vermont Supreme Court, where he served until 1801.

Smith was an active Freemason, and he served as Vermont's first Grand Master from 1794 to 1798. In his later years, Smith and Seth Storrs jointly suffered business reverses that led to their imprisonment for debt. Smith was jailed in Burlington; he began to suffer from dementia or another mental illness in 1811, and the state legislature passed a bill which led to his release.

== Death and burial ==
Smith died in Milton on December 25, 1812, and was buried at Milton Village Cemetery.

== Family ==
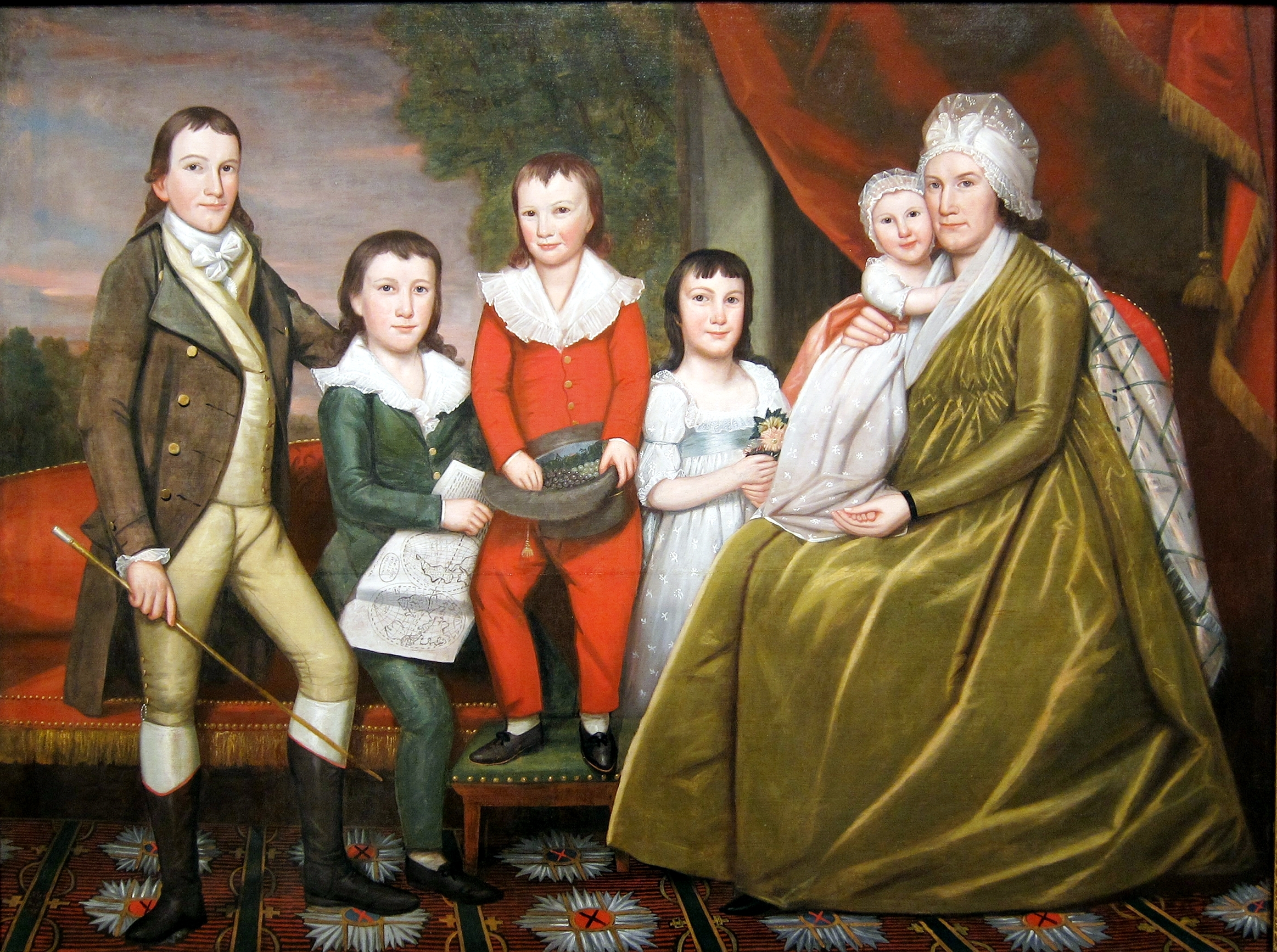
1798 Ralph Earl portrait depicting Chloe Burrall Smith, the wife of Noah Smith, and their five surviving children. From left: Henry, Daniel, Noah, Eliza, and Celia. Oil on canvas original, 64 x 85 3/4 inches. Part of New York's Metropolitan Museum of Art collections.

In 1779, Smith married Chloe Burrall (1757–1810), the daughter of Charles Burrall and Abigail Kellogg of Canaan, Connecticut; her first name is sometimes spelled "Cloe", and her last name spelled variously in written records as Burral, Burrell, Burrill, and Barrall. They were the parents of eight children, five of whom lived to adulthood.

- Henry (1783-1813), a graduate of Yale University who practiced law in Milton.
- Laura (1784-1794)
- Albert (1787-1796)
- Daniel (1789-1823), was a Middlebury College graduate who worked as a missionary and teacher in Mississippi and Kentucky before his death in 1823.
- Eliza (1792-1866), the wife of Fordyce Huntington (1788-1869), a prominent merchant in Vergennes, Vermont.
- Noah Jr. (1794-1825), a Middlebury College graduate who taught school in Louisville, Kentucky.
- Maria (1795-1796)
- Celia (1797-1869), the wife of Hiram Painter, the owner and operator of a Vergennes hotel.

== Sources ==
=== Magazines ===
- Taft, Russell S. (January 1, 1894). "The Supreme Court of Vermont, Part II". The Green Bag. Boston, MA: Boston Book Company.

=== Books ===
- Caldwell, John; Roque, Oswaldo Rodriguez; Johnson, Dale T. (1994). American Paintings in The Metropolitan Museum of Art. Vol. 1. Princeton, NJ: Princeton University Press. ISBN 978-0-87099-244-5.
- Centennial Committee (1892). The Dedication of the Bennington Battle Monument. Bennington, VT: Banner Book and Job Printing.
- Goodrich, John E. (1904). The State of Vermont: Rolls of the Soldiers in the Revolutionary War, 1775 to 1783. Rutland, VT: The Tuttle Company. p. 304.
- Lane Theological Seminary Board of trustees (1879). Memorial of the Rev. Henry Smith, D.D., LL.D. Cincinnati, OH: Elm Street Printing Company.
- Morrissey, Charles T. (1984). Vermont: A History. New York, NY: W. W. Norton. ISBN 978-0-393-34871-2.
- Rann, William S. (1886). History of Chittenden County, Vermont. Syracuse, NY: D. Mason & Co. p. 638.
- Smith, Henry P. (1886). History of Addison County Vermont. Syracuse, NY: D. Mason & Co. p. 686.
- Stiles, Henry R. (2007) [1904]. Families of Ancient Wethersfield, Connecticut. Vol. 2. Westminster, MD: Heritage Books. ISBN 978-0-7884-4377-0.
- Tillotson, Lee S. (1920). Ancient Craft Masonry in Vermont. Montpelier, VT: Capital City Press. p. 65.
- Vermont General Assembly (1929). Journals and Proceedings of the General Assembly of the State of Vermont. Montpelier, VT: Vermont Secretary of State.
- Walton, E. P. (1875). Records of the Council of Safety and Governor and Council of the State of Vermont. Vol. 3. Montpelier, VT: J. and J. M. Poland.
- Walton, E. P. (1876). Records of the Council of Safety and Governor and Council of the State of Vermont. Vol. 4. Montpelier, VT: J. and J. M. Poland.
- Wiley, Edgar J. (1917). Catalogue of Officers and Students of Middlebury College. Middlebury College: Middlebury, VT.

=== Internet ===
- "Noah Smith and Cloe Burral in Early Connecticut Marriages". Ancestry.com. Provo, UT: Ancestry.com, LLC.
- "Death and Burial Record for Noah Smith in Vermont Vital Records, 1720-1908". Ancestry.com. Provo, UT: Ancestry.com, LLC.
