= Israel Smith =

American judge and politician (1759–1810)

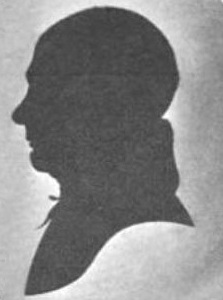
- Silhouette of Israel Smith (only known likeness)

4th Governor of Vermont
- In office October 9, 1807 – October 14, 1808
- Lieutenant: Paul Brigham
- Preceded by: Isaac Tichenor
- Succeeded by: Isaac Tichenor

United States Senator from Vermont
- In office March 4, 1803 – October 1, 1807
- Preceded by: Nathaniel Chipman
- Succeeded by: Jonathan Robinson

Member of the U.S. House of Representatives from Vermont's 1st district
- In office March 4, 1801 – March 3, 1803
- Preceded by: Matthew Lyon
- Succeeded by: Gideon Olin
- In office October 17, 1791 – March 3, 1797
- Preceded by: District established
- Succeeded by: Matthew Lyon

Personal details
- Born: April 4, 1759 Suffield, Colony of Connecticut, British America
- Died: December 2, 1810 (aged 51) Rutland, Vermont, U.S.
- Resting place: West Street Cemetery, Rutland, Vermont
- Party: Democratic-Republican
- Spouse: Abiah Douglass (m. 1783–1810, his death)
- Profession: Attorney

Israel Smith (April 4, 1759 – December 2, 1810) was an American lawyer and politician. He held a wide variety of positions in the state of Vermont, including as a member of the United States House of Representatives, a member of the United States Senate, the fourth governor of Vermont.

== Early life ==
Smith was born in Suffield in the Colony of Connecticut, where he spent his childhood. He studied at Yale University and graduated in 1781. He studied law with his brother Noah Smith, and was admitted to the bar. He began his law practice in Rupert, Vermont.

He married Abiah Douglass (1767–1836), and they had two children, William (1785–1822) and Horace (1787–1790). After Israel Smith's death Abiah married Colonel William C. Harrington, who became an attorney in Burlington, Vermont.

== Career ==
Smith began his political career in 1785 when he served as a member of the Vermont House of Representatives. He served in the Vermont House again from 1788 to 1791. During this period, he was active in solving Vermont's boundary disputes with other states and served as a delegate to the Vermont Constitutional Convention, at which Vermont ratified the American Constitution. By 1790 Smith had moved to Rutland, Vermont.

When Vermont became a state in 1791, Smith ran for Vermont's seat in the United States House of Representatives. In a bitterly fought election between Smith, Matthew Lyon and Isaac Tichenor, Smith received second place, 35% of the vote in the first round, but won the runoff against Lyon. Smith represented Vermont's 1st District in the U.S. House from 1791 to 1797. In 1792 and 1794, Lyon unsuccessfully ran against Smith, but in 1796 Smith was defeated by Lyon. By this time, Smith had become a member of the Democratic-Republican Party.

In 1797, Smith again briefly served in the Vermont State House. He became Chief Justice of the Vermont Supreme Court in 1797, but resigned the following year. In 1800, Smith was reelected to the United States House of Representatives, where he served until 1802.

In 1802, Smith was elected to the United States Senate from Vermont, and served in the Senate from 1803 to 1807. Smith challenged one of his old political rivals — governor Isaac Tichenor, who served as governor from 1797 to 1807 — six times. He was unsuccessful in his first five attempts in 1799, 1800, 1801, 1802, and 1806, but finally defeated Tichenor in 1807. Smith resigned from the Senate and served as Governor of Vermont from 1807 to 1808, when he was defeated for reelection by Tichenor, who served for one last year before being defeated in 1809 by Jones Galusha.

== Death and legacy ==
After leaving the governorship, Smith resumed practicing law in Rutland. He became ill and died in Rutland. He was interred at West Street Cemetery in Rutland. His home in Rutland has been preserved.

Party political offices
Preceded by Moses Robinson	Democratic-Republican nominee for Governor of Vermont; 1799, 1800, 1801, 1802	Succeeded by Jonathan Robinson
Preceded by Jonathan Robinson	Democratic-Republican nominee for Governor of Vermont; 1806, 1807, 1808	Succeeded by Jonas Galusha
U.S. House of Representatives
Preceded by District created	Member of the U.S. House of Representatives from Vermont's 1st congressional district 1791–1797	Succeeded by Matthew Lyon
Preceded by Matthew Lyon	Member of the U.S. House of Representatives from Vermont's 1st congressional district 1801–1803	Succeeded by Gideon Olin
U.S. Senate
Preceded by Nathaniel Chipman	U.S. senator (Class 1) from Vermont; 1803–1807; Served alongside: Stephen R. Bradley	Succeeded by Jonathan Robinson
Political offices
Preceded by Isaac Tichenor	Governor of Vermont; 1807–1808	Succeeded by Isaac Tichenor
