= Gideon Olin =

American politician

Member of the U.S. House of Representatives from Vermont's 1st district
- In office March 4, 1803 – March 3, 1807
- Preceded by: Israel Smith
- Succeeded by: James Witherell

Member of the Vermont House of Representatives
- In office 1780-1793; 1799

Personal details
- Born: November 2, 1743 East Greenwich, Rhode Island Colony, British America
- Died: January 21, 1823 (aged 79) Shaftsbury, Vermont, U.S.
- Party: Democratic-Republican
- Spouse(s): Lydia Myers Pope Olin and Patience Dwinnell Olin
- Children: Benjamin Olin, Esther Olin, Nathaniel Green Olin, Abram Baldwin Olin and Job S. Olin
- Profession: farmer, congressman

Gideon Olin (November 2, 1743 – January 21, 1823) was an American politician. He served as a United States representative from Vermont.

== Biography ==
Olin was born in East Greenwich in the Colony of Rhode Island and Providence Plantations to John and Susannah Pierce Olin. He received limited schooling and engaged in agricultural pursuits. He moved to Vermont and settled in Shaftsbury in 1776, becoming one of the founders of Vermont.

Olin was a delegate to the Windsor Convention in 1777, which enacted the constitution that formed the Vermont Republic. He was a member of the Vermont House of Representatives in 1778, 1780 to 1793, and in 1799, serving as Speaker from 1788 to 1793.

During the American Revolutionary War, Olin was appointed Major in the Second Regiment under Colonels Samuel Herrick and Ebenezer Walbridge, and served on the frontier. After the war, he served as an assistant judge of the Bennington County Court from 1781 to 1798. He was a delegate to the state constitutional convention in 1791 and 1793, and a member of the Governor’s council from 1793 to 1798.

Olin was elected as a Democratic-Republican to the Eighth and Ninth Congresses, serving from March 4, 1803 to March 3, 1807. He served as chief justice of the Bennington county court from 1807 to 1811, and was a founder of the University of Vermont. After leaving office, he resumed agricultural pursuits.

== Family life ==
Olin married Patience Dwinnell on December 13, 1768. He later married Lydia Myers Pope and they had five children.

Olin was the uncle of Henry Olin. Both Abram Baldwin Olin and Henry Olin served as United States Representatives in the 19th century.

== Death ==
Olin died in Shaftsbury, Vermont on January 21, 1823, and is interred at Center Shaftsbury Cemetery in Shaftsbury, Vermont.

U.S. House of Representatives
Preceded by Israel Smith	Member of the U.S. House of Representatives from Vermont's 1st congressional district 1803-1807	Succeeded by James Witherell
