= Elijah Paine =

American judge (1757–1842)

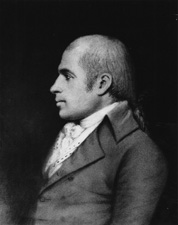

Judge of the United States District Court for the District of Vermont
- In office March 3, 1801 – April 1, 1842
- Appointed by: John Adams
- Preceded by: Samuel Hitchcock
- Succeeded by: Samuel Prentiss

United States Senator from Vermont
- In office March 4, 1795 – September 1, 1801
- Preceded by: Stephen R. Bradley
- Succeeded by: Stephen R. Bradley

Personal details
- Born: Elijah Paine; January 21, 1757 Brooklyn, Connecticut Colony, British America
- Died: April 28, 1842 (aged 85) Williamstown, Vermont, US
- Resting place: West Hill Cemetery, Williamstown, Vermont
- Party: Federalist
- Spouse: Sarah Porter (m. 1790–1842)
- Children: 4 (including Charles Paine)
- Education: Harvard University (A.B.)
- Profession: Attorney

Elijah Paine (January 21, 1757 – April 28, 1842) was a justice of the Supreme Court of Vermont, a United States senator from Vermont and a United States district judge of the United States District Court for the District of Vermont.

== Education and career ==
Born on January 21, 1757, in Brooklyn, Connecticut Colony, British America, Paine attended the public schools and served in the Continental Army from 1776 to 1777, during the American Revolutionary War. He received an Artium Baccalaureus degree in 1781 from Harvard University and read law in 1784. He was admitted to the bar and entered private practice in Windsor, Vermont from 1784 to 1787. He cultivated a farm and began a settlement at Williamstown, Vermont. He established a cloth factory and a saw and grist mill in Northfield, Vermont. He was secretary of the Vermont constitutional convention in 1786. He was a member of the Vermont House of Representatives from 1787 to 1789. He was a Judge of the Probate Court for the Randolph District of Vermont from 1788 to 1791. He was a justice of the Supreme Court of Vermont from 1791 to 1793. In 1793, Paine ran for Vermont's 2nd congressional district, finishing a distant second to Anti-Federalist incumbent Nathaniel Niles.

== Congressional service ==
Paine was elected to the United States Senate from Vermont in 1794. He was reelected as a Federalist in 1800 and served from March 4, 1795, to September 1, 1801, when he resigned to accept a federal judicial post.

== Federal judicial service ==
On February 24, 1801, Paine was nominated by President John Adams to the seat on the United States District Court for the District of Vermont vacated by Judge Samuel Hitchcock. He was confirmed by the United States Senate on February 25, 1801, and received his commission on March 3, 1801. His service terminated on April 1, 1842, due to his resignation.

=== Other service ===
Concurrent with his federal judicial service, Paine served as Postmaster of Williamstown, Vermont from 1815 to 1842.

== Death ==
Paine died on April 28, 1842, in Williamstown.

== Family ==
The son of Seth Paine, Paine married Sarah Porter of Plymouth, New Hampshire. They had four sons; Martin Paine, an eminent physician; Elijah Paine Jr., a judge of the New York Supreme Court; George Paine, a prominent lawyer; and Charles Paine, who was Governor of Vermont from 1841 to 1843.

== Memberships ==
Paine was elected a Fellow of the American Academy of Arts and Sciences in 1812, and a member of the American Antiquarian Society in 1813.

== See also ==
- List of United States federal judges by longevity of service

== Sources ==
- United States Congress. "Elijah Paine (id: P000026)". Biographical Directory of the United States Congress.
- Elijah Paine at the Biographical Directory of Federal Judges, a publication of the Federal Judicial Center.
- Govtrack US Congress
- The Political Graveyard
- This article incorporates public domain material from Biographical Directory of the United States Congress. Federal government of the United States.

U.S. Senate
Preceded by Stephen R. Bradley	United States Senator (Class 3) from Vermont; 1795–1801	Succeeded by Stephen R. Bradley
Legal offices
Preceded by Samuel Hitchcock	Judge of the United States District Court for the District of Vermont; 1801–1842	Succeeded by Samuel Prentiss
