= Thomas Chittenden =

Vermont politician (1730–1797)

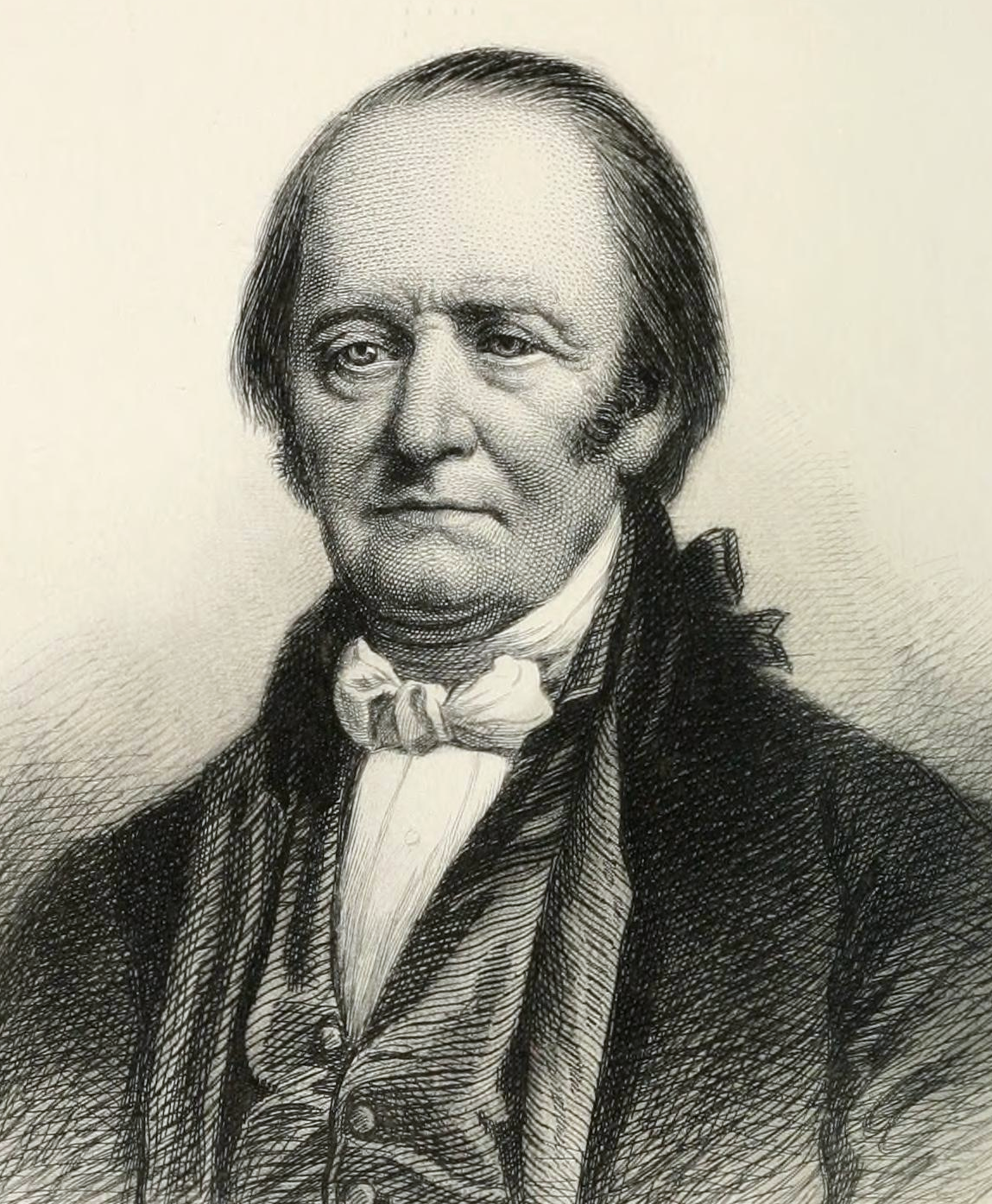
- Governor Thomas Chittenden (presumed likeness)

1st Governor of Vermont
- In office March 5, 1791 – August 25, 1797
- Lieutenant: Paul Brigham
- Preceded by: Himself (as Governor of the Vermont Republic)
- Succeeded by: Paul Brigham

1st & 3rd Governor of the Vermont Republic
- In office October 20, 1790 – March 4, 1791
- Lieutenant: Peter Olcott
- Preceded by: Moses Robinson
- Succeeded by: Himself (as Governor of the State of Vermont)
- In office March 13, 1778 – October 13, 1789
- Lieutenant: Joseph Marsh
- Preceded by: Position established
- Succeeded by: Moses Robinson

Member of the Connecticut Colonial Assembly
- In office 1765–1769

Personal details
- Born: January 6, 1730 East Guilford, Colony of Connecticut, British America
- Died: August 25, 1797 (aged 67) Williston, Vermont, U.S.
- Resting place: Thomas Chittenden Cemetery, Williston, Vermont
- Party: None
- Spouse: Elizabeth Meigs Chittenden (m. 1749–1797, his death)
- Children: 10, including Martin

Thomas Chittenden (January 6, 1730 – August 25, 1797) was an American politician from Vermont, who was a leader of the territory for nearly two decades. He was the state's first and third governor, serving from 1778 to 1789—when it was a largely unrecognized independent state now called the Vermont Republic—and again from 1790 until his death. Vermont was admitted to the Union in 1791 as its 14th state.

== Early and personal life ==
Thomas Chittenden was born in East Guilford in the Connecticut Colony on January 6, 1730. He lost one of his eyes and was referred to as "one eye Tom" by his opponents. He married Elizabeth Meigs on October 4, 1749, in Salisbury, Connecticut. They had four sons and six daughters while they were living in Connecticut, all of whom survived to adulthood.

== Career ==
Chittenden served as a justice of the peace and in the Connecticut Colonial Assembly from 1765 to 1769. He served in Connecticut's 14th Regiment of Militia from 1767 to 1773, rising to the rank of colonel.

Chittenden was one of the residents of Salisbury, Connecticut, who purchased land from the Onion River Land Company run by Ethan Allen, Ira Allen, Heman Allen, and Remember Baker. Chittenden moved to the New Hampshire Grants, now Vermont, in 1774, where he was the first settler in the town of Williston.

Chittenden was a delegate to the 1777 constitutional convention that established Vermont's constitution and drafted its Declaration of Independence. Chittenden was selected as governor of the Vermont Republic on March 12, 1778, by the legislature and Joseph Marsh was selected as lieutenant governor.

During the American Revolution, Chittenden was a member of a committee empowered to negotiate with the Continental Congress to allow Vermont to join the Union. The Congress deferred the matter to avoid antagonizing the states of New York and New Hampshire, which had competing claims against Vermont. During the period of the Vermont Republic, Chittenden served as governor from 1778 to 1789 and 1790 to 1791, and was one of the participants in a series of delicate negotiations with British authorities in Quebec over the possibility of establishing Vermont as a British province.

After Vermont entered the federal Union in 1791 as its 14th state, Chittenden continued as governor until his death in 1797.

== Death ==
Chittenden died in Williston on August 25, 1797, and is interred at Thomas Chittenden Cemetery, Williston, Chittenden County, Vermont. Citing Vermont's tumultuous founding, his epitaph reads: "Out of storm and manifold perils rose an enduring state, the home of freedom and unity."

== Legacy and honors ==
In 1894, a monument to Chittenden was begun at the entrance to the cemetery in Williston which is named for him; it was dedicated in 1896. An engraved portrait of Chittenden can be found just outside the entrance to the Executive Chamber, the ceremonial office of the governor, at the Vermont State House at Montpelier. The portrait is based on a likeness of one of Chittenden's grandsons, who was believed to resemble Chittenden. In the late 1990s, a bronze sculpture of Chittenden, which was created by Frank Gaylord, was placed on the grounds of the State House near the building's west entrance. Another Chittenden statue, also created by Gaylord, was erected in front of the Williston Central School. Chittenden County is named for him, as is the town of Chittenden in Rutland County.

== See also ==
- Vermont Republic
- Constitution of Vermont
- List of governors of Vermont

== Works cited ==
- Doyle, William (1992). The Vermont Political Tradition: And Those Who Helped Make It. ISBN 0961548614.

Political offices
Preceded by Office established	Governor of Vermont; 1791–1797	Succeeded by Paul Brigham
