= Paul Brigham =

American politician and soldier (1746–1824)

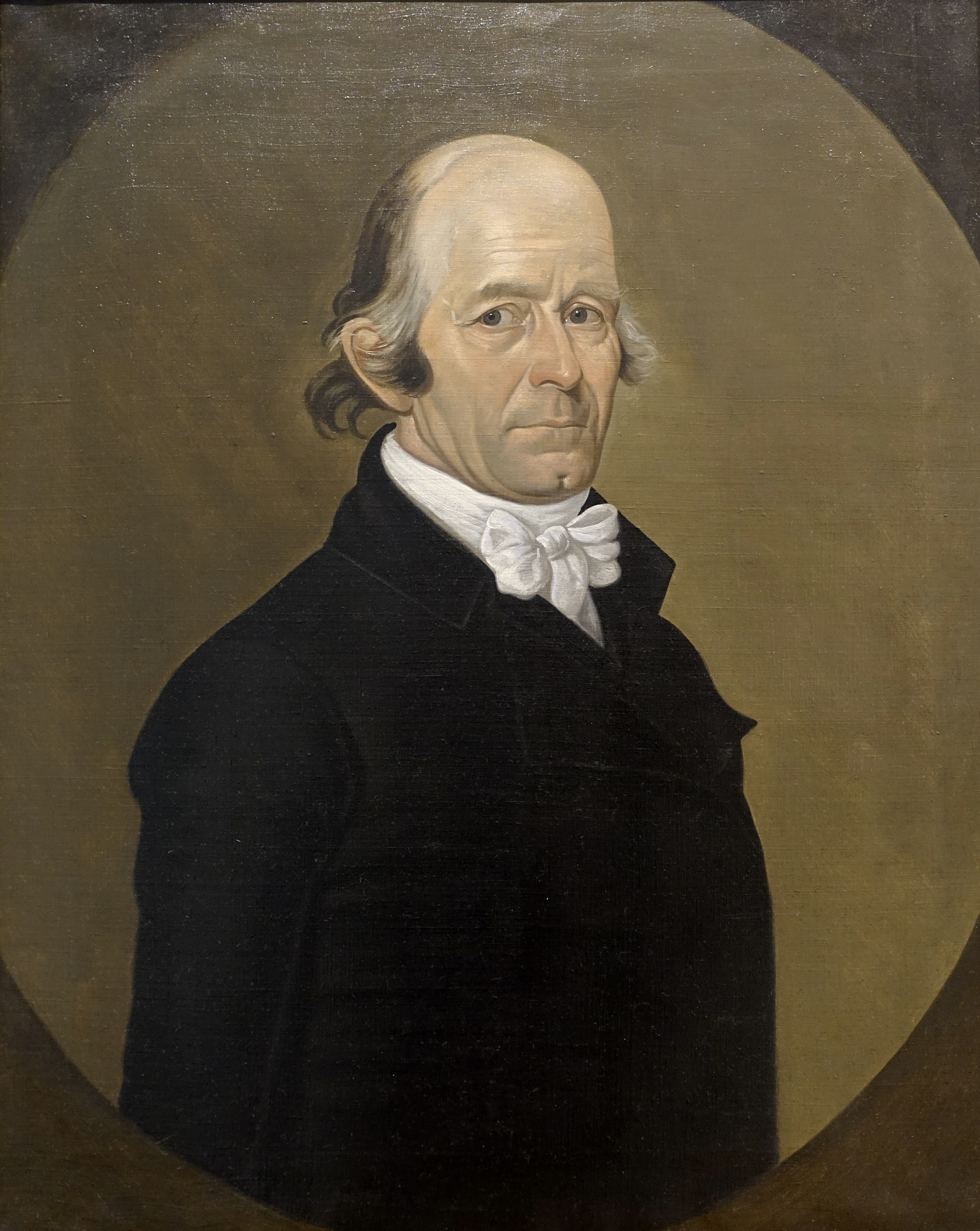
- Portrait by William Jennys, c. 1802

2nd Governor of Vermont
- In office August 25, 1797 – October 16, 1797
- Lieutenant: Himself
- Preceded by: Thomas Chittenden
- Succeeded by: Isaac Tichenor

3rd and 5th Lieutenant Governor of Vermont
- In office October 14, 1815 – October 23, 1820
- Governor: Jonas Galusha
- Preceded by: William Chamberlain
- Succeeded by: William Cahoon
- In office October 13, 1796 – October 23, 1813
- Governor: Thomas Chittenden (1796–1797); Himself (1797); Isaac Tichenor (1797–1807); Israel Smith (1807–1808); Isaac Tichenor (1808–1809); Jonas Galusha (1809–1813)
- Preceded by: Jonathan Hunt
- Succeeded by: William Chamberlain

Personal details
- Born: January 1746 Coventry, Colony of Connecticut, British America
- Died: June 15, 1824 (aged 78) Norwich, Vermont, U.S.
- Party: Democratic-Republican
- Spouse: Lydia Sawyer
- Profession: Soldier / Judge / Politician

Paul Brigham (January 1746 – June 15, 1824) was an American Revolutionary soldier and Democratic-Republican politician. He was the second lieutenant governor of Vermont after that state was admitted to the Union in 1791, and upon the death of Vermont's first governor Thomas Chittenden, served as governor for the last seven weeks of Chittenden's term. (During the 14 years before admission to the Union, when Vermont was a largely unrecognized state, several others served as lieutenant governor and two persons served as governor.)

== Biography ==
Brigham, son of Paul and Catherine (Turner) Brigham, was born in January 1746, in Coventry in the Colony of Connecticut. The exact date of his birth varies from source to source. Some give his birthday as January 6; others give it as January 17. He married Lydia Sawyer (of Hebron, Connecticut) on October 3, 1767, and the couple had five children.

== Career ==
Brigham served from January 1, 1777, to April 22, 1781, as a captain in the Connecticut Militia during the American Revolutionary War. He was a company commander of Continental troops under the command of General George Washington and wintered in Valley Forge during the winter of 1777.

In the spring of 1782 Brigham and his family moved to Norwich, Vermont, where he was a farmer and a land speculator. He served as high sheriff of Windsor County, Vermont, for five years and as major general of the Vermont Militia. He was chief judge of the county court for five years, and was a presidential elector for Vermont in 1792. In 1793 and 1794, he ran for the U.S. House of Representatives, receiving less than 5% of the vote both times. He was on the Governor's Council from 1793 to 1796.

Brigham was annually elected lieutenant governor of Vermont for 16 consecutive years, from 1796 to 1813; only the brief Federalist resurgence removed Brigham and other Republicans from office. After conclusion to the War of 1812, which gave life to the moribund Federalist Party all across New England for their opposition, Brigham was again lieutenant governor, this time from 1815 until 1820. Upon the death of Governor Thomas Chittenden, he served for a short time as the second governor of Vermont from August 25 to October 16, 1797, when the new governor, Isaac Tichenor was sworn in. Brigham then resumed his duties as lieutenant governor. He retired and returned to his home in Norwich in 1820.

== Death and legacy ==
Brigham died in Norwich on June 16, 1824. He was interred at Fairview Cemetery in his hometown of Norwich. The journal of his army experiences was published as A Revolutionary Diary of Captain Paul Brigham, November 19, 1777 – September 4, 1778.

The obituary from the New-Hampshire Patriot (NH), July 12, 1824, p. 3, reads:

In Norwich, Vt. on the 15th ult. PAUL BRIGHAM, in the 79th year of his age. Extensively known, eulogy would add nothing to the right which the virtuous actions of a good man justly claim for the deceased. For four years he served as a Captain in the war for Independence; five years was the High Sheriff of Windsor county; a Major General of Militia; five years Chief Judge of the County Court; and 22 of 24 succeeding years Lieutenant Governor of this State. In all these offices he sustained the reputation of discharging their several duties to the satisfaction of his fellow citizens; and received their almost unanimous suffrages for the latter, until admonished by the infirmities of age, that retirement was necessary, he declined any further public service.

— Vt. Journal.

Party political offices
First	Democratic-Republican nominee for Lieutenant Governor of Vermont; 1796, 1797, 1798, 1799, 1800, 1801, 1802, 1803, 1804, 1805, 1806, 1807, 1808, 1809, 1810, 1811, 1812, 1813, 1814, 1815, 1816, 1817, 1818, 1819	Succeeded by William Cahoon
Political offices
Preceded by Thomas Chittenden	Governor of Vermont; 1797	Succeeded by Isaac Tichenor
Preceded by Jonathan Hunt	Lieutenant Governor of Vermont; 1796–1813	Succeeded by William Chamberlin
Preceded by William Chamberlin	Lieutenant Governor of Vermont; 1815–1820	Succeeded by William Cahoon
