= Freeman (Thirteen Colonies) =

Colonial American person who was not a slave

During the American colonial period a freeman was a person who was not a slave. The term originated in 12th-century Europe.

In the Massachusetts Bay Colony, a man had to be a member of the Church to be a freeman; in the neighboring Plymouth Colony a man did not need to be a member of the Church, but he had to be elected to this privilege by the General Court. Being a freeman carried with it the right to vote, and in Plymouth only freemen could vote by 1632.

Black's Law Dictionary (9th edition) defines freeman as follows:

1. A person who possesses and enjoys all the civil and political rights belonging to the people under a free government.

2. A person who is not a slave.

3. Hist. A member of a municipal corporation (a city or a borough) who possesses full civic rights, esp. the right to vote.

4. Hist. A freeholder. Cf. villein.

5. Hist. An allodial landowner. Cf. vassal. - also written free man.

"Freedom" was earned after an allotted time, or after the person demanding "payment" was satisfied. This was known as indentured servitude, and was not originally intended as a stigma or embarrassment for the person involved; many of the sons and daughters of the wealthy and famous of the time found themselves forced into such temporary servitude, Gary Nash reporting that "many of the servants were actually nephews, nieces, cousins and children of friends of emigrating Englishmen, who paid their passage in return for their labor once in America."

An indentured servant would sign a contract agreeing to serve for a specific number of years, typically five or seven. Many immigrants to the colonies came as indentured servants, with someone else paying their passage to the Colonies in return for a promise of service. At the end of his service, according to the contract, the indentured servant usually would be granted a sum of money, a new suit of clothes, land, or perhaps passage back to England. An indentured servant was not the same as an apprentice or a child who was "placed out."

Once a man was made a freeman and was no longer considered a commoner, he could become a member of the church (and would usually do so) and he could own land. The amount of land that he was able to own was sometimes determined by how many members there were in his family. As a freeman, he became a member of the governing body, which met in annual or semiannual meetings (town meetings) to make and enforce laws and pass judgment in civil and criminal matters. As the colonies grew, these meetings became impractical and a representative bicameral system was developed. Freemen would choose deputy governors who made up the upper house of the General Court, and assistant governors who made up the lower house, who chose the governor from among their ranks and passed judgments in civil and criminal matters. To hold one of these offices it was required, of course, for one to be a freeman. Thus, the enfranchised voters and office holders were landholding male church members. Non-Puritans were not made freeman.

== Progression to freeman ==
Initially, a male was not formally considered free when first entering into a colony, or just recently having become a member of one of the local churches; he was considered common. Such persons were never forced to work for another individual, per se, but their movements were carefully observed, and if they veered from the Puritan ideal, they were asked to leave the colony. There was an unstated probationary period, usually one to two years, that the prospective "freeman" needed to go through, and he was allowed his freedom if he did pass this probationary period of time. A Freeman was said to be free of all debt, owing nothing to anyone except God Himself.

== Free planter ==
A "free planter" (as opposed to a "freeman") was any land holder who possessed land outright that was usually given to him by the colony after he had finished his probationary period, except in those cases where the land owner had inherited his property. But if he was deemed legally incompetent, didn't pass his probationary period, or again lost his freedom through some irresponsibility of his own, he would have his land and property confiscated and redistributed among the remaining freemen, even if the inheritor was a well-respected citizen.

== Oath of a freeman ==
Initially, all persons seeking to be free needed to take the Oath of a Freeman, in which they vowed to defend the Commonwealth and not to conspire to overthrow the government. The first handwritten version of the "Freeman's Oath" was made in 1634; it was printed by Stephen Daye in 1639 in the form of a broadside or single sheet of paper intended for posting in public places.
