= List of governors of Vermont =

The governor of Vermont is the head of government of the U.S. state of Vermont. Since 1994, Vermont is one of only two U.S. states (New Hampshire being the other) that elects governors for two-year terms. Until 1870, Vermont elected its governors for one-year terms. Isaac Tichenor, Jonas Galusha, Erastus Fairbanks, and Richard A. Snelling each served non-consecutive terms, while Thomas Chittenden served non-consecutive terms as governor of the Vermont Republic.

== Mountain Rule ==
From the founding of the Republican Party in the 1850s until the 1960s, only Republicans won general elections for Vermont's statewide offices. One method that made this possible was the Republican Party's imposition of the "Mountain Rule," an informal mechanism which restricted the pool of candidates.

Under the original provisions of the Mountain Rule, one U.S. senator was a resident of the east side of the Green Mountains and one resided on the west side. The expanded version of the rule called for the governorship and lieutenant governorship to alternate between residents of the east and west sides. Nominees for governor and lieutenant governor were originally allowed two one-year terms, and later one two-year term. For nearly 100 years, likely Republican candidates for office in Vermont agreed to abide by the expanded Mountain Rule in the interests of party unity. Several factors led to the eventual weakening of the Mountain Rule, including the long political dispute between the Proctor (conservative) and Aiken–Gibson (progressive) wings of the party; primaries rather than conventions to select nominees; the direct election of U.S. Senators; and several active third parties, including the Progressives, the Prohibition Party, and the Local Option movement. In the 1960s, the rise of the Vermont Democratic Party and the construction of Interstate 89 also contributed to the end of the Mountain Rule. Although I-89 is a north–south route, it traverses Vermont from southeast to northwest for the majority of its length within the state and changed the way residents view how it is divided.

== List of governors ==
=== Vermont Republic ===
The Vermont Republic declared independence from Great Britain on January 15, 1777.

Governors of the Republic of Vermont
No.	Governor	Term in office	Election	Lt. Governor
1	Thomas Chittenden (1730–1797)	March 13, 1778 – October 13, 1789 (4233 days; lost election)	^{Mar.}1778	Joseph Marsh
1	Thomas Chittenden (1730–1797)	March 13, 1778 – October 13, 1789 (4233 days; lost election)	^{Sept.}1778	Joseph Marsh
1	Thomas Chittenden (1730–1797)	March 13, 1778 – October 13, 1789 (4233 days; lost election)	1779	Benjamin Carpenter
1	Thomas Chittenden (1730–1797)	March 13, 1778 – October 13, 1789 (4233 days; lost election)	1780	Benjamin Carpenter
1	Thomas Chittenden (1730–1797)	March 13, 1778 – October 13, 1789 (4233 days; lost election)	1781	Elisha Payne
1	Thomas Chittenden (1730–1797)	March 13, 1778 – October 13, 1789 (4233 days; lost election)	1782	Paul Spooner
1	Thomas Chittenden (1730–1797)	March 13, 1778 – October 13, 1789 (4233 days; lost election)	1783	Paul Spooner
1	Thomas Chittenden (1730–1797)	March 13, 1778 – October 13, 1789 (4233 days; lost election)	1784	Paul Spooner
1	Thomas Chittenden (1730–1797)	March 13, 1778 – October 13, 1789 (4233 days; lost election)	1785	Paul Spooner
1	Thomas Chittenden (1730–1797)	March 13, 1778 – October 13, 1789 (4233 days; lost election)	1786	Joseph Marsh
1	Thomas Chittenden (1730–1797)	March 13, 1778 – October 13, 1789 (4233 days; lost election)	1787	Joseph Marsh
1	Thomas Chittenden (1730–1797)	March 13, 1778 – October 13, 1789 (4233 days; lost election)	1788	Joseph Marsh
2	Moses Robinson (1741–1813)	October 13, 1789 – October 20, 1790 (373 days; lost election)	1789	Joseph Marsh
3	Thomas Chittenden (1730–1797)	October 20, 1790 – March 4, 1791 (136 days; became state governor)	1790	Peter Olcott

=== State of Vermont ===
Vermont was admitted to the Union on March 4, 1791.

Governors of the State of Vermont
No.	Governor	Term in office	Party	Election	Lt. Governor (Note: Lieutenant governors represented the same party as their governor unless noted.)
1	Thomas Chittenden (1730–1797)	March 5, 1791 – August 25, 1797 (2366 days; died in office)	No party	1791	Peter Olcott
1	Thomas Chittenden (1730–1797)	March 5, 1791 – August 25, 1797 (2366 days; died in office)	No party	1792	Peter Olcott
1	Thomas Chittenden (1730–1797)	March 5, 1791 – August 25, 1797 (2366 days; died in office)	No party	1793	Peter Olcott
1	Thomas Chittenden (1730–1797)	March 5, 1791 – August 25, 1797 (2366 days; died in office)	No party	1794	Jonathan Hunt
1	Thomas Chittenden (1730–1797)	March 5, 1791 – August 25, 1797 (2366 days; died in office)	No party	1795	Jonathan Hunt
1	Thomas Chittenden (1730–1797)	March 5, 1791 – August 25, 1797 (2366 days; died in office)	No party	1796	Paul Brigham (Note: Represented the Democratic-Republican Party)
2	Paul Brigham (1746–1824)	August 25, 1797 – October 16, 1797 (53 days; retired) (Note: Brigham was instead reelected as lieutenant governor.)	Democratic- Republican	Succeeded from lieutenant governor	Vacant
3	Isaac Tichenor (1754–1838)	October 16, 1797 – October 9, 1807 (3645 days; lost election)	Federalist	1797	Paul Brigham
3	Isaac Tichenor (1754–1838)	October 16, 1797 – October 9, 1807 (3645 days; lost election)	Federalist	1798	Paul Brigham
3	Isaac Tichenor (1754–1838)	October 16, 1797 – October 9, 1807 (3645 days; lost election)	Federalist	1799	Paul Brigham
3	Isaac Tichenor (1754–1838)	October 16, 1797 – October 9, 1807 (3645 days; lost election)	Federalist	1800	Paul Brigham
3	Isaac Tichenor (1754–1838)	October 16, 1797 – October 9, 1807 (3645 days; lost election)	Federalist	1801	Paul Brigham
3	Isaac Tichenor (1754–1838)	October 16, 1797 – October 9, 1807 (3645 days; lost election)	Federalist	1802	Paul Brigham
3	Isaac Tichenor (1754–1838)	October 16, 1797 – October 9, 1807 (3645 days; lost election)	Federalist	1803	Paul Brigham
3	Isaac Tichenor (1754–1838)	October 16, 1797 – October 9, 1807 (3645 days; lost election)	Federalist	1804	Paul Brigham
3	Isaac Tichenor (1754–1838)	October 16, 1797 – October 9, 1807 (3645 days; lost election)	Federalist	1805	Paul Brigham
3	Isaac Tichenor (1754–1838)	October 16, 1797 – October 9, 1807 (3645 days; lost election)	Federalist	1806	Paul Brigham
4	Israel Smith (1759–1810)	October 9, 1807 – October 14, 1808 (372 days; lost election)	Democratic- Republican	1807	Paul Brigham
5	Isaac Tichenor (1754–1838)	October 14, 1808 – October 14, 1809 (366 days; lost election)	Federalist	1808	Paul Brigham
6	Jonas Galusha (1753–1834)	October 14, 1809 – October 23, 1813 (1471 days; lost election)	Democratic- Republican	1809	Paul Brigham
6	Jonas Galusha (1753–1834)	October 14, 1809 – October 23, 1813 (1471 days; lost election)	Democratic- Republican	1810	Paul Brigham
6	Jonas Galusha (1753–1834)	October 14, 1809 – October 23, 1813 (1471 days; lost election)	Democratic- Republican	1811	Paul Brigham
6	Jonas Galusha (1753–1834)	October 14, 1809 – October 23, 1813 (1471 days; lost election)	Democratic- Republican	1812	Paul Brigham
7	Martin Chittenden (1763–1840)	October 23, 1813 – October 14, 1815 (722 days; lost election)	Federalist	1813	William Chamberlain
7	Martin Chittenden (1763–1840)	October 23, 1813 – October 14, 1815 (722 days; lost election)	Federalist	1814	William Chamberlain
8	Jonas Galusha (1753–1834)	October 14, 1815 – October 13, 1820 (1827 days; retired)	Democratic- Republican	1815	Paul Brigham
8	Jonas Galusha (1753–1834)	October 14, 1815 – October 13, 1820 (1827 days; retired)	Democratic- Republican	1816	Paul Brigham
8	Jonas Galusha (1753–1834)	October 14, 1815 – October 13, 1820 (1827 days; retired)	Democratic- Republican	1817	Paul Brigham
8	Jonas Galusha (1753–1834)	October 14, 1815 – October 13, 1820 (1827 days; retired)	Democratic- Republican	1818	Paul Brigham
8	Jonas Galusha (1753–1834)	October 14, 1815 – October 13, 1820 (1827 days; retired)	Democratic- Republican	1819	Paul Brigham
9	Richard Skinner (1778–1833)	October 13, 1820 – October 10, 1823 (1093 days; retired)	Democratic- Republican	1820	William Cahoon
9	Richard Skinner (1778–1833)	October 13, 1820 – October 10, 1823 (1093 days; retired)	Democratic- Republican	1821	William Cahoon
9	Richard Skinner (1778–1833)	October 13, 1820 – October 10, 1823 (1093 days; retired)	Democratic- Republican	1822	Aaron Leland
10	Cornelius P. Van Ness (1782–1852)	October 10, 1823 – October 13, 1826 (1100 days; retired)	Democratic- Republican	1823	Aaron Leland
10	Cornelius P. Van Ness (1782–1852)	October 10, 1823 – October 13, 1826 (1100 days; retired)	Democratic- Republican	1824	Aaron Leland
10	Cornelius P. Van Ness (1782–1852)	October 10, 1823 – October 13, 1826 (1100 days; retired)	Democratic- Republican	1825	Aaron Leland
11	Ezra Butler (1763–1838)	October 13, 1826 – October 10, 1828 (729 days; retired)	National; Republican	1826	Aaron Leland
11	Ezra Butler (1763–1838)	October 13, 1826 – October 10, 1828 (729 days; retired)	National; Republican	1827	Henry Olin
12	Samuel C. Crafts (1768–1853)	October 10, 1828 – October 18, 1831 (1104 days; retired)	National; Republican	1828	Henry Olin
12	Samuel C. Crafts (1768–1853)	October 10, 1828 – October 18, 1831 (1104 days; retired)	National; Republican	1829	Henry Olin
12	Samuel C. Crafts (1768–1853)	October 10, 1828 – October 18, 1831 (1104 days; retired)	National; Republican	1830	Mark Richards
13	William A. Palmer (1781–1860)	October 18, 1831 – November 2, 1835 (1477 days; deadlocked election) (Note: In the 1835 election, Palmer received a plurality, but not the required majority; the legislature remained deadlocked after 63 votes and the joint assembly dissolved on November 2 without choosing a governor, so Lieutenant Governor Jennison acted as governor for the term.)	Anti-Masonic	1831	Lebbeus Egerton
13	William A. Palmer (1781–1860)	October 18, 1831 – November 2, 1835 (1477 days; deadlocked election)	Anti-Masonic	1832	Lebbeus Egerton
13	William A. Palmer (1781–1860)	October 18, 1831 – November 2, 1835 (1477 days; deadlocked election)	Anti-Masonic	1833	Lebbeus Egerton
13	William A. Palmer (1781–1860)	October 18, 1831 – November 2, 1835 (1477 days; deadlocked election)	Anti-Masonic	1834	Lebbeus Egerton
14	Silas H. Jennison (1791–1849)	November 2, 1835 – October 18, 1841 (2178 days; retired)	Whig (Note: Jennison represented both the Anti-Masonic and Whig parties in 1835.)	1835	Acting as governor
14	Silas H. Jennison (1791–1849)	November 2, 1835 – October 18, 1841 (2178 days; retired)	Whig	1836	David M. Camp
14	Silas H. Jennison (1791–1849)	November 2, 1835 – October 18, 1841 (2178 days; retired)	Whig	1837	David M. Camp
14	Silas H. Jennison (1791–1849)	November 2, 1835 – October 18, 1841 (2178 days; retired)	Whig	1838	David M. Camp
14	Silas H. Jennison (1791–1849)	November 2, 1835 – October 18, 1841 (2178 days; retired)	Whig	1839	David M. Camp
14	Silas H. Jennison (1791–1849)	November 2, 1835 – October 18, 1841 (2178 days; retired)	Whig	1840	David M. Camp
15	Charles Paine (1799–1853)	October 18, 1841 – October 13, 1843 (726 days; retired)	Whig	1841	Waitstill R. Ranney
15	Charles Paine (1799–1853)	October 18, 1841 – October 13, 1843 (726 days; retired)	Whig	1842	Waitstill R. Ranney
16	John Mattocks (1777–1847)	October 13, 1843 – October 11, 1844 (365 days; retired)	Whig	1843	Horace Eaton
17	William Slade (1786–1859)	October 11, 1844 – October 9, 1846 (729 days; retired)	Whig	1844	Horace Eaton
17	William Slade (1786–1859)	October 11, 1844 – October 9, 1846 (729 days; retired)	Whig	1845	Horace Eaton
18	Horace Eaton (1804–1855)	October 9, 1846 – October 19, 1848 (742 days; retired)	Whig	1846	Leonard Sargeant
18	Horace Eaton (1804–1855)	October 9, 1846 – October 19, 1848 (742 days; retired)	Whig	1847	Leonard Sargeant
19	Carlos Coolidge (1792–1866)	October 19, 1848 – October 12, 1850 (724 days; retired)	Whig	1848	Robert Pierpoint
19	Carlos Coolidge (1792–1866)	October 19, 1848 – October 12, 1850 (724 days; retired)	Whig	1849	Robert Pierpoint
20	Charles K. Williams (1782–1853)	October 12, 1850 – October 18, 1852 (738 days; retired)	Whig	1850	Julius Converse
20	Charles K. Williams (1782–1853)	October 12, 1850 – October 18, 1852 (738 days; retired)	Whig	1851	Julius Converse
21	Erastus Fairbanks (1792–1864)	October 18, 1852 – November 1, 1853 (380 days; lost election)	Whig	1852	William C. Kittredge
22	John S. Robinson (1804–1860)	November 1, 1853 – October 13, 1854 (347 days; retired)	Democratic	1853	Jefferson P. Kidder
23	Stephen Royce (1787–1868)	October 13, 1854 – October 10, 1856 (729 days; retired)	Whig	1854	Ryland Fletcher
23	Stephen Royce (1787–1868)	October 13, 1854 – October 10, 1856 (729 days; retired)	Republican	1855	Ryland Fletcher
24	Ryland Fletcher (1799–1885)	October 10, 1856 – October 15, 1858 (736 days; retired)	Republican	1856	James M. Slade
24	Ryland Fletcher (1799–1885)	October 10, 1856 – October 15, 1858 (736 days; retired)	Republican	1857	James M. Slade
25	Hiland Hall (1795–1885)	October 15, 1858 – October 12, 1860 (729 days; retired)	Republican	1858	Burnham Martin
25	Hiland Hall (1795–1885)	October 15, 1858 – October 12, 1860 (729 days; retired)	Republican	1859	Burnham Martin
26	Erastus Fairbanks (1792–1864)	October 12, 1860 – October 22, 1861 (376 days; retired)	Republican	1860	Levi Underwood
27	Frederick Holbrook (1813–1909)	October 22, 1861 – October 9, 1863 (718 days; retired)	Republican	1861	Levi Underwood
27	Frederick Holbrook (1813–1909)	October 22, 1861 – October 9, 1863 (718 days; retired)	Republican	1862	Paul Dillingham
28	J. Gregory Smith (1818–1891)	October 9, 1863 – October 13, 1865 (736 days; retired)	Republican	1863	Paul Dillingham
28	J. Gregory Smith (1818–1891)	October 9, 1863 – October 13, 1865 (736 days; retired)	Republican	1864	Paul Dillingham
29	Paul Dillingham (1799–1891)	October 13, 1865 – October 13, 1867 (731 days; retired)	Republican	1865	Abraham B. Gardner
29	Paul Dillingham (1799–1891)	October 13, 1865 – October 13, 1867 (731 days; retired)	Republican	1866	Abraham B. Gardner
30	John B. Page (1826–1885)	October 13, 1867 – October 16, 1869 (735 days; retired)	Republican	1867	Stephen Thomas
30	John B. Page (1826–1885)	October 13, 1867 – October 16, 1869 (735 days; retired)	Republican	1868	Stephen Thomas
31	Peter T. Washburn (1814–1870)	October 16, 1869 – February 7, 1870 (115 days; died in office)	Republican	1869	George Whitman Hendee
32	George Whitman Hendee (1832–1906)	February 7, 1870 – October 6, 1870 (242 days; retired) (Note: Republican convention delegates decided that since Washburn, from the East side of the Green Mountains, had won the nomination in 1869, the 1870 nomination should go to a candidate from the West. They also decided that though he was from the West, nominating Hendee would violate the Mountain Rule's two years in office provision, because 1870 would be the first election for a two-year term. As a result, Hendee was not a candidate.)	Republican	Succeeded from lieutenant governor	Vacant
33	John Wolcott Stewart (1825–1915)	October 6, 1870 – October 3, 1872 (729 days; lost nomination) (Note: Vermont's gubernatorial terms were changed from one year to two. Stewart argued that the Mountain Rule's two-term limit on governors should allow him to serve two two-year terms. Republican convention delegates decided that the Mountain Rule limited governors to two years in office, so Stewart was not renominated.)	Republican	1870	George N. Dale
34	Julius Converse (1798–1885)	October 3, 1872 – October 8, 1874 (736 days; retired)	Republican	1872	Russell S. Taft
35	Asahel Peck (1803–1879)	October 8, 1874 – October 5, 1876 (729 days; retired)	Republican	1874	Lyman G. Hinckley
36	Horace Fairbanks (1820–1888)	October 5, 1876 – October 3, 1878 (729 days; retired)	Republican	1876	Redfield Proctor
37	Redfield Proctor (1831–1908)	October 3, 1878 – October 7, 1880 (736 days; retired)	Republican	1878	Eben Pomeroy Colton
38	Roswell Farnham (1827–1903)	October 7, 1880 – October 5, 1882 (729 days; retired)	Republican	1880	John L. Barstow
39	John L. Barstow (1832–1913)	October 5, 1882 – October 2, 1884 (729 days; retired)	Republican	1882	Samuel E. Pingree
40	Samuel E. Pingree (1832–1922)	October 2, 1884 – October 7, 1886 (736 days; retired)	Republican	1884	Ebenezer J. Ormsbee
41	Ebenezer J. Ormsbee (1834–1924)	October 7, 1886 – October 4, 1888 (729 days; retired)	Republican	1886	Levi K. Fuller
42	William P. Dillingham (1843–1923)	October 4, 1888 – October 2, 1890 (729 days; retired)	Republican	1888	Urban A. Woodbury
43	Carroll S. Page (1843–1925)	October 2, 1890 – October 6, 1892 (736 days; retired)	Republican	1890	Henry A. Fletcher
44	Levi K. Fuller (1841–1896)	October 6, 1892 – October 4, 1894 (729 days; retired)	Republican	1892	Farrand Stewart Stranahan
45	Urban A. Woodbury (1838–1915)	October 4, 1894 – October 8, 1896 (736 days; retired)	Republican	1894	Zophar Mansur
46	Josiah Grout (1841–1925)	October 8, 1896 – October 6, 1898 (729 days; retired)	Republican	1896	Nelson W. Fisk
47	Edward Curtis Smith (1854–1935)	October 6, 1898 – October 4, 1900 (729 days; retired)	Republican	1898	Henry C. Bates
48	William W. Stickney (1853–1932)	October 4, 1900 – October 3, 1902 (730 days; retired)	Republican	1900	Martin F. Allen
49	John G. McCullough (1835–1915)	October 3, 1902 – October 6, 1904 (735 days; retired)	Republican	1902	Zed S. Stanton
50	Charles J. Bell (1845–1909)	October 6, 1904 – October 4, 1906 (729 days; retired)	Republican	1904	Charles H. Stearns
51	Fletcher D. Proctor (1860–1911)	October 4, 1906 – October 8, 1908 (736 days; retired)	Republican	1906	George H. Prouty
52	George H. Prouty (1862–1918)	October 8, 1908 – October 6, 1910 (729 days; retired)	Republican	1908	John A. Mead
53	John A. Mead (1841–1920)	October 6, 1910 – October 3, 1912 (729 days; retired)	Republican	1910	Leighton P. Slack
54	Allen M. Fletcher (1853–1922)	October 3, 1912 – January 7, 1915 (827 days; retired)	Republican	1912	Frank E. Howe
55	Charles W. Gates (1856–1927)	January 7, 1915 – January 4, 1917 (729 days; retired)	Republican	1914	Hale K. Darling
56	Horace F. Graham (1862–1941)	January 4, 1917 – January 10, 1919 (737 days; retired)	Republican	1916	Roger W. Hulburd
57	Percival W. Clement (1846–1927)	January 10, 1919 – January 7, 1921 (729 days; retired)	Republican	1918	Mason S. Stone
58	James Hartness (1861–1934)	January 7, 1921 – January 4, 1923 (728 days; retired)	Republican	1920	Abram W. Foote
59	Redfield Proctor Jr. (1879–1957)	January 4, 1923 – January 8, 1925 (736 days; retired)	Republican	1922	Franklin S. Billings
60	Franklin S. Billings (1862–1935)	January 8, 1925 – January 6, 1927 (729 days; retired)	Republican	1924	Walter K. Farnsworth
61	John E. Weeks (1853–1949)	January 6, 1927 – January 8, 1931 (1464 days; retired) (Note: Weeks was instead elected to the United States House of Representatives.)	Republican	1926	Samuel Hollister Jackson (died November 2, 1927)
61	John E. Weeks (1853–1949)	January 6, 1927 – January 8, 1931 (1464 days; retired)	Republican	1926	Vacant
61	John E. Weeks (1853–1949)	January 6, 1927 – January 8, 1931 (1464 days; retired)	Republican	1928	Stanley C. Wilson
62	Stanley C. Wilson (1879–1967)	January 8, 1931 – January 10, 1935 (1464 days; retired)	Republican	1930	Benjamin Williams
62	Stanley C. Wilson (1879–1967)	January 8, 1931 – January 10, 1935 (1464 days; retired)	Republican	1932	Charles Manley Smith
63	Charles Manley Smith (1868–1937)	January 10, 1935 – January 7, 1937 (729 days; retired)	Republican	1934	George Aiken
64	George Aiken (1892–1984)	January 7, 1937 – January 9, 1941 (1464 days; retired) (Note: Aiken was instead elected to the United States Senate.)	Republican	1936	William Henry Wills
64	George Aiken (1892–1984)	January 7, 1937 – January 9, 1941 (1464 days; retired)	Republican	1938	William Henry Wills
65	William Henry Wills (1882–1946)	January 9, 1941 – January 4, 1945 (1457 days; retired)	Republican	1940	Mortimer R. Proctor
65	William Henry Wills (1882–1946)	January 9, 1941 – January 4, 1945 (1457 days; retired)	Republican	1942	Mortimer R. Proctor
66	Mortimer R. Proctor (1889–1968)	January 4, 1945 – January 9, 1947 (736 days; lost nomination)	Republican	1944	Lee E. Emerson
67	Ernest W. Gibson Jr. (1901–1969)	January 9, 1947 – January 16, 1950 (1104 days; resigned) (Note: Gibson resigned, having been confirmed to the United States District Court for the District of Vermont.)	Republican	1946	Lee E. Emerson
67	Ernest W. Gibson Jr. (1901–1969)	January 9, 1947 – January 16, 1950 (1104 days; resigned)	Republican	1948	Harold J. Arthur
68	Harold J. Arthur (1904–1971)	January 16, 1950 – January 4, 1951 (354 days; retired)	Republican	Succeeded from lieutenant governor	Vacant
69	Lee E. Emerson (1898–1976)	January 4, 1951 – January 6, 1955 (1464 days; retired)	Republican	1950	Joseph B. Johnson
69	Lee E. Emerson (1898–1976)	January 4, 1951 – January 6, 1955 (1464 days; retired)	Republican	1952	Joseph B. Johnson
70	Joseph B. Johnson (1893–1986)	January 6, 1955 – January 15, 1959 (1471 days; retired)	Republican	1954	Consuelo N. Bailey
70	Joseph B. Johnson (1893–1986)	January 6, 1955 – January 15, 1959 (1471 days; retired)	Republican	1956	Robert Stafford
71	Robert Stafford (1913–2006)	January 15, 1959 – January 5, 1961 (722 days; retired) (Note: Stafford was instead elected to the United States House of Representatives.)	Republican	1958	Robert S. Babcock
72	F. Ray Keyser Jr. (1927–2015)	January 5, 1961 – January 10, 1963 (736 days; lost election)	Republican	1960	Ralph A. Foote (Note: Represented the Republican Party)
73	Philip H. Hoff (1924–2018)	January 10, 1963 – January 9, 1969 (2192 days; retired)	Democratic	1962	Ralph A. Foote
73	Philip H. Hoff (1924–2018)	January 10, 1963 – January 9, 1969 (2192 days; retired)	Democratic	1964	John J. Daley
73	Philip H. Hoff (1924–2018)	January 10, 1963 – January 9, 1969 (2192 days; retired)	Democratic	1966	John J. Daley
74	Deane C. Davis (1900–1990)	January 9, 1969 – January 4, 1973 (1457 days; retired)	Republican	1968	Thomas L. Hayes
74	Deane C. Davis (1900–1990)	January 9, 1969 – January 4, 1973 (1457 days; retired)	Republican	1970	John S. Burgess
75	Thomas P. Salmon (1932–2025)	January 4, 1973 – January 6, 1977 (1464 days; retired) (Note: Salmon instead ran unsuccessfully for the United States Senate.)	Democratic	1972	John S. Burgess
75	Thomas P. Salmon (1932–2025)	January 4, 1973 – January 6, 1977 (1464 days; retired)	Democratic	1974	Brian D. Burns
76	Richard A. Snelling (1927–1991)	January 6, 1977 – January 10, 1985 (2927 days; retired)	Republican	1976	T. Garry Buckley
76	Richard A. Snelling (1927–1991)	January 6, 1977 – January 10, 1985 (2927 days; retired)	Republican	1978	Madeleine Kunin (Note: Represented the Democratic Party)
76	Richard A. Snelling (1927–1991)	January 6, 1977 – January 10, 1985 (2927 days; retired)	Republican	1980	Madeleine Kunin
76	Richard A. Snelling (1927–1991)	January 6, 1977 – January 10, 1985 (2927 days; retired)	Republican	1982	Peter Plympton Smith
77	Madeleine Kunin (b. 1933)	January 10, 1985 – January 10, 1991 (2192 days; retired)	Democratic	1984	Peter Plympton Smith
77	Madeleine Kunin (b. 1933)	January 10, 1985 – January 10, 1991 (2192 days; retired)	Democratic	1986	Howard Dean
77	Madeleine Kunin (b. 1933)	January 10, 1985 – January 10, 1991 (2192 days; retired)	Democratic	1988	Howard Dean
78	Richard A. Snelling (1927–1991)	January 10, 1991 – August 13, 1991 (216 days; died in office)	Republican	1990	Howard Dean
79	Howard Dean (b. 1948)	August 13, 1991 – January 9, 2003 (4168 days; retired)	Democratic	Succeeded from lieutenant governor	Vacant
79	Howard Dean (b. 1948)	August 13, 1991 – January 9, 2003 (4168 days; retired)	Democratic	1992	Barbara Snelling
79	Howard Dean (b. 1948)	August 13, 1991 – January 9, 2003 (4168 days; retired)	Democratic	1994	Barbara Snelling
79	Howard Dean (b. 1948)	August 13, 1991 – January 9, 2003 (4168 days; retired)	Democratic	1996	Doug Racine
79	Howard Dean (b. 1948)	August 13, 1991 – January 9, 2003 (4168 days; retired)	Democratic	1998	Doug Racine
79	Howard Dean (b. 1948)	August 13, 1991 – January 9, 2003 (4168 days; retired)	Democratic	2000	Doug Racine
80	Jim Douglas (b. 1951)	January 9, 2003 – January 6, 2011 (2920 days; retired)	Republican	2002	Brian Dubie
80	Jim Douglas (b. 1951)	January 9, 2003 – January 6, 2011 (2920 days; retired)	Republican	2004	Brian Dubie
80	Jim Douglas (b. 1951)	January 9, 2003 – January 6, 2011 (2920 days; retired)	Republican	2006	Brian Dubie
80	Jim Douglas (b. 1951)	January 9, 2003 – January 6, 2011 (2920 days; retired)	Republican	2008	Brian Dubie
81	Peter Shumlin (b. 1956)	January 6, 2011 – January 5, 2017 (2192 days; retired)	Democratic	2010	Phil Scott
81	Peter Shumlin (b. 1956)	January 6, 2011 – January 5, 2017 (2192 days; retired)	Democratic	2012	Phil Scott
81	Peter Shumlin (b. 1956)	January 6, 2011 – January 5, 2017 (2192 days; retired)	Democratic	2014	Phil Scott
82	Phil Scott (b. 1958)	January 5, 2017 – Incumbent (Note: Scott's fifth term began on January 9, 2025, and will expire in January 2027; he was elected to a sixth term on November 3, 2026.) (in office 3609 days)	Republican	2016	David Zuckerman (Note: Represented the Progressive Party)
82	Phil Scott (b. 1958)	January 5, 2017 – Incumbent (in office 3609 days)	Republican	2018	David Zuckerman
82	Phil Scott (b. 1958)	January 5, 2017 – Incumbent (in office 3609 days)	Republican	2020	Molly Gray
82	Phil Scott (b. 1958)	January 5, 2017 – Incumbent (in office 3609 days)	Republican	2022	David Zuckerman
82	Phil Scott (b. 1958)	January 5, 2017 – Incumbent (in office 3609 days)	Republican	2024	John S. Rodgers
82	Phil Scott (b. 1958)	January 5, 2017 – Incumbent (in office 3609 days)	Republican	2026	Molly Gray

== See also ==
- Gubernatorial lines of succession in the United States § Vermont
- List of lieutenant governors of Vermont
- List of Vermont General Assemblies

== Sources ==
- "Former Vermont Governors". National Governors Association.
- "Vermont Constitution". State Democracy Research Initiative. University of Wisconsin Law School.
- Dubin, Michael J. (2003). United States Gubernatorial Elections, 1776–1860: The Official Results by State and County. McFarland. ISBN 0-7864-1439-1 – via Internet Archive.
- Glashan, Roy R. (1979). American Governors and Gubernatorial Elections, 1775-1978. Meckler Books. ISBN 0-7201-1511-6 – via Internet Archive.
- Kallenbach, Joseph E.; Kallenbach, Jessamine S. (1977). American State Governors, 1776-1976. Oceana Publications. ISBN 978-0-379-00665-0 – via Internet Archive.
- Mullaney, Marie Marmo (1994). Biographical Directory of the Governors of the United States, 1988–1994. Greenwood Publishing Group. ISBN 0-313-28312-5 – via Internet Archive.
- Sobel, Robert; Raimo, John (1978). Biographical Directory of the Governors of the United States, 1789-1978. Vol. 4. Meckler Books. ISBN 0-930466-01-2 – via Internet Archive.
- Thorpe, Francis Newton, ed. (1909). The Federal and State Constitutions, Colonial Charters, and Other Organic Laws of the States, Territories, and Colonies Now or Heretofore Forming the United States of America. Vol. 6. United States Government Publishing Office – via Internet Archive.
