= 1786 Vermont Republic gubernatorial election =

- September 5, 1786
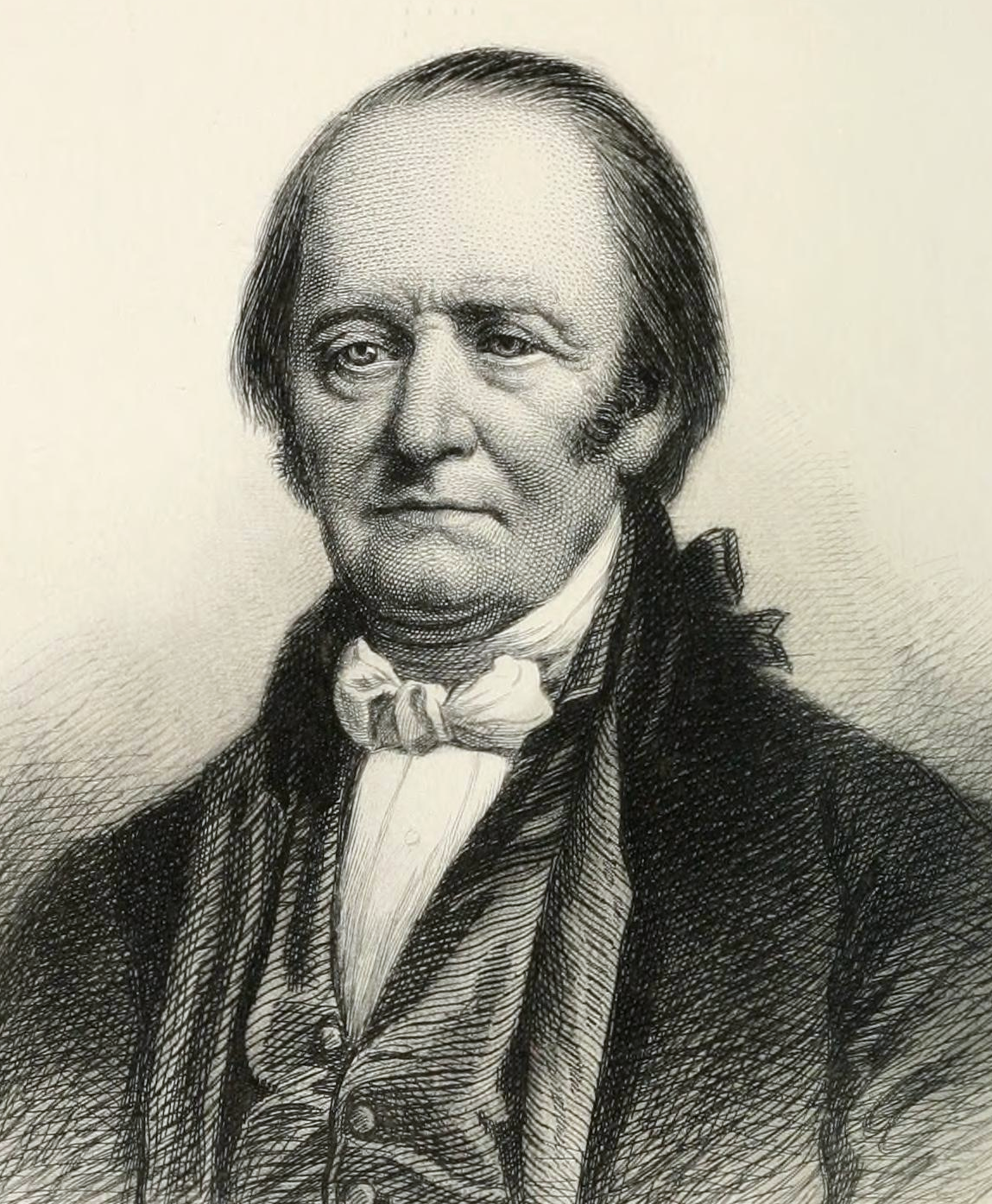
Nominee	Thomas Chittenden
Party	Independent
Governor before election
Thomas Chittenden
Independent
Elected Governor
Thomas Chittenden
Independent

The 1786 Vermont Republic gubernatorial election took place on September 5, 1786. It resulted in the re-election of Thomas Chittenden to a one-year term.

The Vermont General Assembly met in Rutland on October 12. The Vermont House of Representatives appointed a committee to examine the votes of the freemen of Vermont for governor, lieutenant governor, treasurer, and members of the governor's council. In the race for governor, Thomas Chittenden was re-elected to a one-year term, his ninth.

In the election for lieutenant governor, no candidate received a majority. As required by the Vermont Constitution, the Vermont General Assembly convened on October 13 to make a choice. The balloting by the Assembly resulted in the selection of Paul Spooner for a fifth one-year term. Spooner subsequently declined the office. On October 14, the General Assembly selected Joseph Marsh, who began performing the duties in February 1787.

The election for treasurer also resulted in no candidate obtaining a majority. As with the lieutenant governor's office, the Vermont Constitution required the General Assembly to choose. On October 13, the Assembly chose Samuel Mattocks for treasurer, the first time since the republic's founding that Ira Allen was not selected. The names of candidates and balloting totals were not recorded. According to contemporary newspaper articles, Chittenden was re-elected "by a respectable majority."

== Results ==
1786 Vermont Republic gubernatorial election
Party	Candidate	Votes	%
Nonpartisan	Thomas Chittenden (incumbent)	**	**
