= 1783 Vermont Republic gubernatorial election =

- September 2, 1783
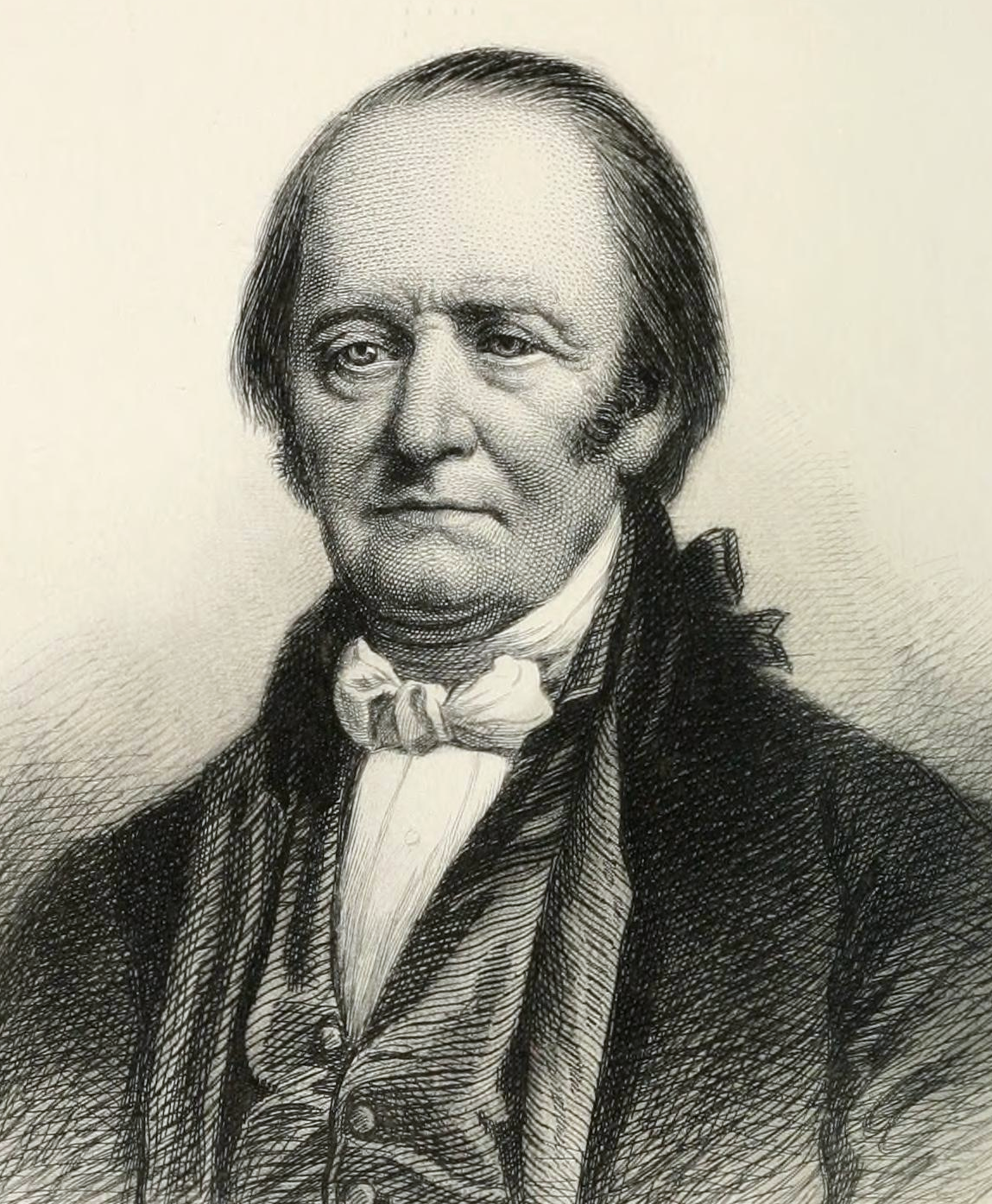
Nominee	Thomas Chittenden
Party	Independent
Governor before election
Thomas Chittenden
Independent
Elected Governor
Thomas Chittenden
Independent

The 1783 Vermont Republic gubernatorial election took place on September 2, 1783. It resulted in the re-election of Thomas Chittenden to a one-year term.

The Vermont General Assembly met in Westminster on October 9. The Vermont House of Representatives appointed a committee to examine the votes of the freemen of Vermont for governor, lieutenant governor, treasurer, and governor's council members. Thomas Chittenden was re-elected to a one-year term as governor.

In the election for lieutenant governor, Paul Spooner was re-elected to a second one-year term. In addition, Ira Allen was re-elected to a one-year term as treasurer. The names of candidates and balloting totals were not recorded.

== Results ==
1783 Vermont Republic gubernatorial election
Party	Candidate	Votes	%
Nonpartisan	Thomas Chittenden (incumbent)	**	**
