= 1788 Vermont Republic gubernatorial election =

- September 2, 1788
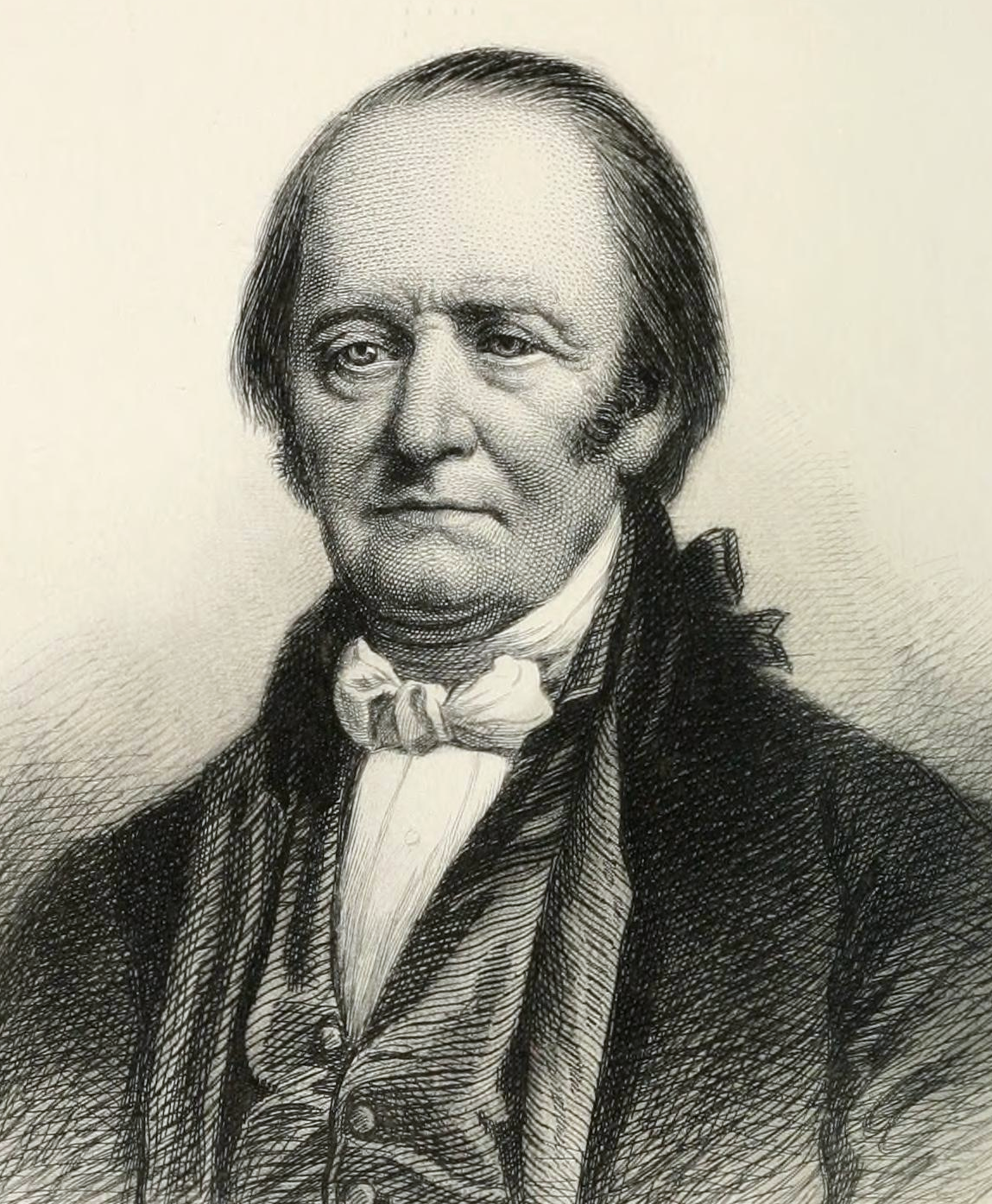
Nominee	Thomas Chittenden
Party	Independent
Governor before election
Thomas Chittenden
Independent
Elected Governor
Thomas Chittenden
Independent

The 1788 Vermont Republic gubernatorial election took place on September 2, 1788. It resulted in the re-election of Thomas Chittenden to a one-year term.

The Vermont General Assembly met in Manchester on October 9. The Vermont House of Representatives appointed a committee to examine the votes of the freemen of Vermont for governor, lieutenant governor, treasurer, and members of the governor's council. In the race for governor, Thomas Chittenden was re-elected to his eleventh one-year term.

In the election for lieutenant governor Joseph Marsh was re-elected to a one-year term. The freemen re-elected Samuel Mattocks as treasurer, his third one-year term. The names of candidates and balloting totals were not recorded.

== Results ==
1788 Vermont Republic gubernatorial election
Party	Candidate	Votes	%
Nonpartisan	Thomas Chittenden (incumbent)	**	**
