= 1785 Vermont Republic gubernatorial election =

- September 6, 1785
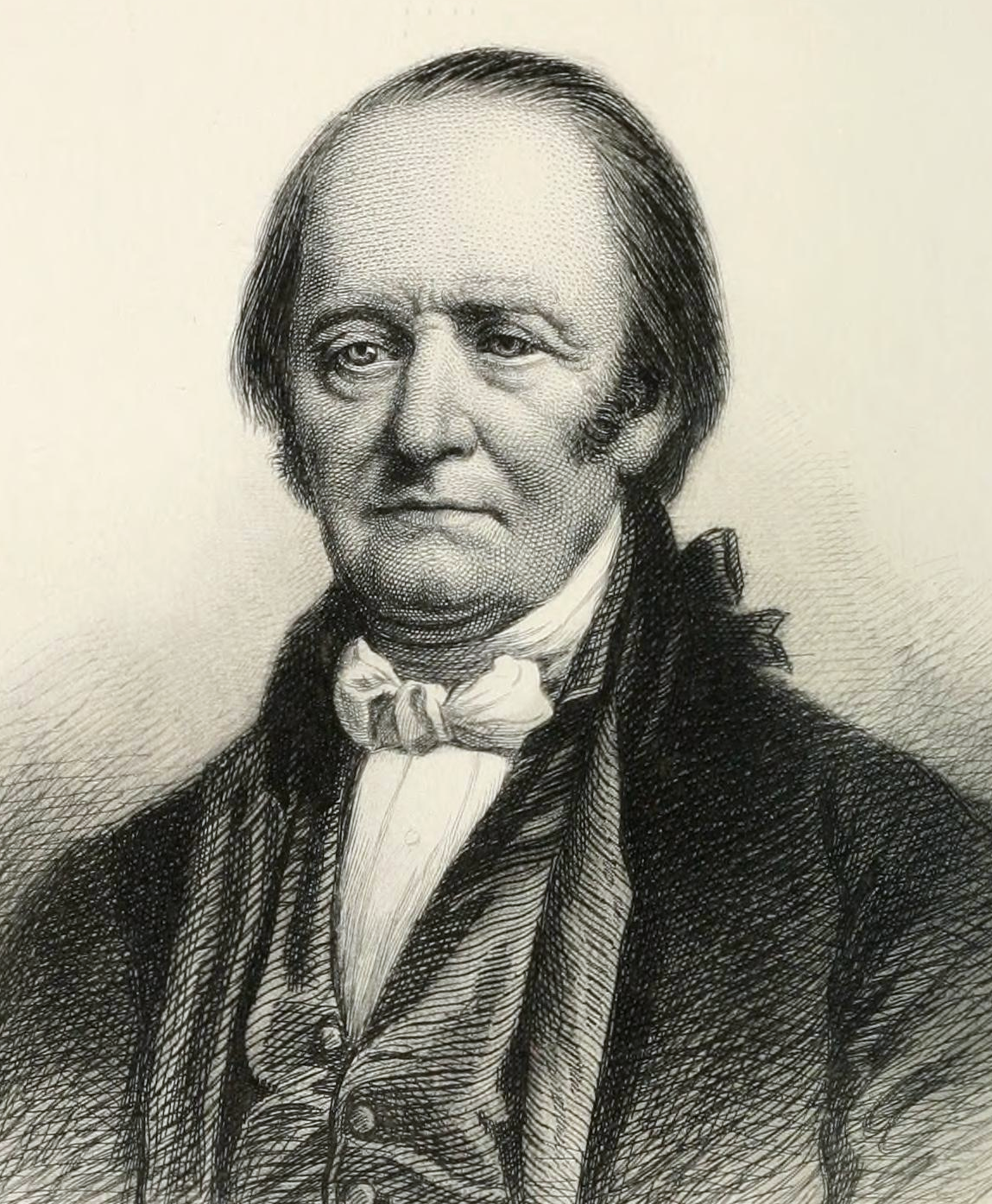
Nominee	Thomas Chittenden
Party	Independent
Governor before election
Thomas Chittenden
Independent
Elected Governor
Thomas Chittenden
Independent

The 1785 Vermont Republic gubernatorial election took place on September 6, 1785. It resulted in the re-election of Thomas Chittenden to a one-year term.

The Vermont General Assembly met in Windsor on October 13. The Vermont House of Representatives appointed a committee to examine the votes of the freemen of Vermont for governor, lieutenant governor, treasurer, and members of the governor's council.

In the race for governor, Thomas Chittenden was re-elected to a one-year term, his eighth. In the election for lieutenant governor, Paul Spooner was chosen for a fourth one-year term. No candidate for treasurer obtained a majority. In accordance with the Vermont Constitution, the Vermont General Assembly was required to make a selection. On October 14, the Assembly (Vermont House of Representatives, governor, and governor's council) re-elected Ira Allen to his eighth one-year term as treasurer. The names of candidates and balloting totals were not recorded.

== Results ==
1785 Vermont Republic gubernatorial election
Party	Candidate	Votes	%
Nonpartisan	Thomas Chittenden (incumbent)	**	**
