= 1782 Vermont Republic gubernatorial election =

- September 3, 1782
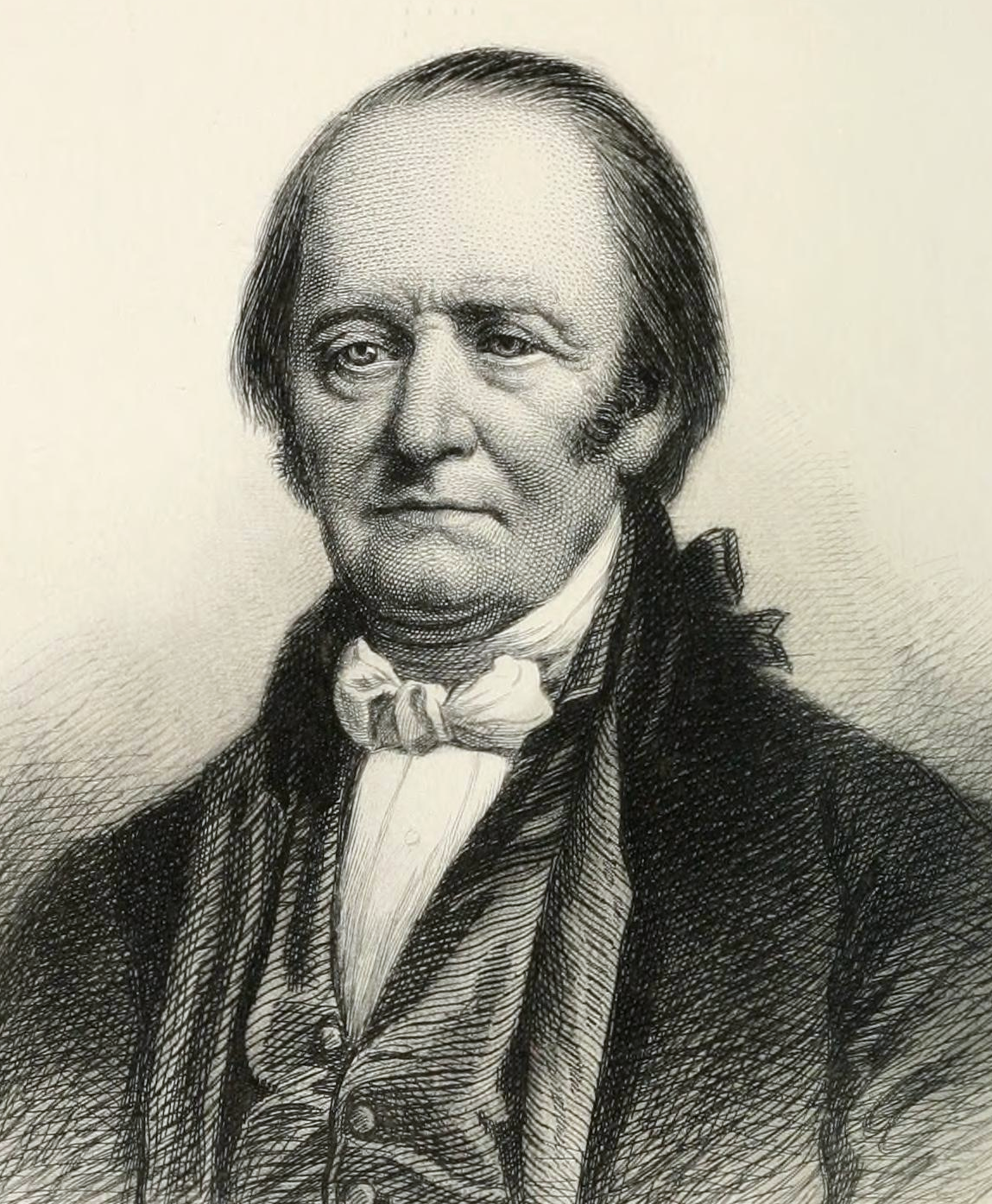
Nominee	Thomas Chittenden
Party	Independent
Governor before election
Thomas Chittenden
Independent
Elected Governor
Thomas Chittenden
Independent

The 1782 Vermont Republic gubernatorial election took place on September 3, 1782. It resulted in the re-election of Thomas Chittenden to a one-year term.

The Vermont General Assembly met in Manchester on October 10. The Vermont House of Representatives appointed a committee to examine the votes of the freemen of Vermont for governor, lieutenant governor, treasurer, and members of the governor's council. Thomas Chittenden was re-elected to a one-year term as governor.

The popular vote indicated that no candidate for lieutenant governor had received a majority. In keeping with the Vermont Constitution, the choice fell to the Vermont General Assembly, which chose Paul Spooner for a one-year term. Ira Allen was re-elected to a one-year term as treasurer. The names of candidates and balloting totals were not recorded.

== Results ==
1782 Vermont Republic gubernatorial election
Party	Candidate	Votes	%
Nonpartisan	Thomas Chittenden (incumbent)	**	**
