= 1787 Vermont Republic gubernatorial election =

- September 4, 1787
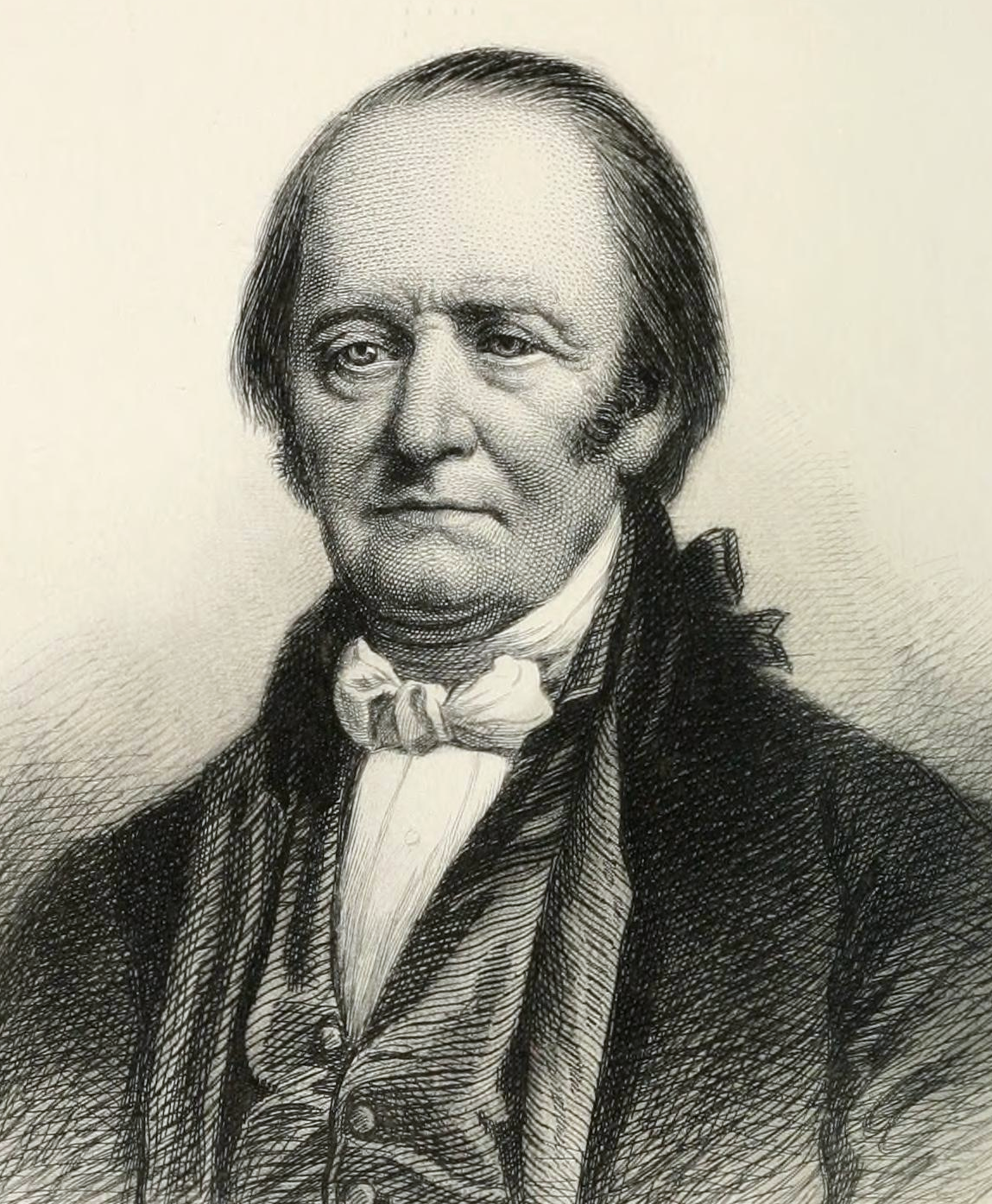
Nominee	Thomas Chittenden
Party	Independent
Governor before election
Thomas Chittenden
Independent
Elected Governor
Thomas Chittenden
Independent

The 1787 Vermont Republic gubernatorial election took place on September 4, 1787. It resulted in the re-election of Thomas Chittenden to a one-year term.

The Vermont General Assembly met in Newbury on October 11. The Vermont House of Representatives appointed a committee to examine the votes of the freemen of Vermont for governor, lieutenant governor, treasurer, and members of the governor's council. In the race for governor, Thomas Chittenden was re-elected to his tenth one-year term.

In the election for lieutenant governor Joseph Marsh, who had served a partial term beginning in February, was elected to a full one-year term. The freemen re-elected Samuel Mattocks as treasurer, his second one-year term. The names of candidates and balloting totals were not recorded. One Vermont newspaper reported that Chittenden had been re-elected "by a great majority of the freemen."

== Results ==
1787 Vermont Republic gubernatorial election
Party	Candidate	Votes	%
Nonpartisan	Thomas Chittenden (incumbent)	**	**
