= 1792 Vermont gubernatorial election =

- September 4, 1792
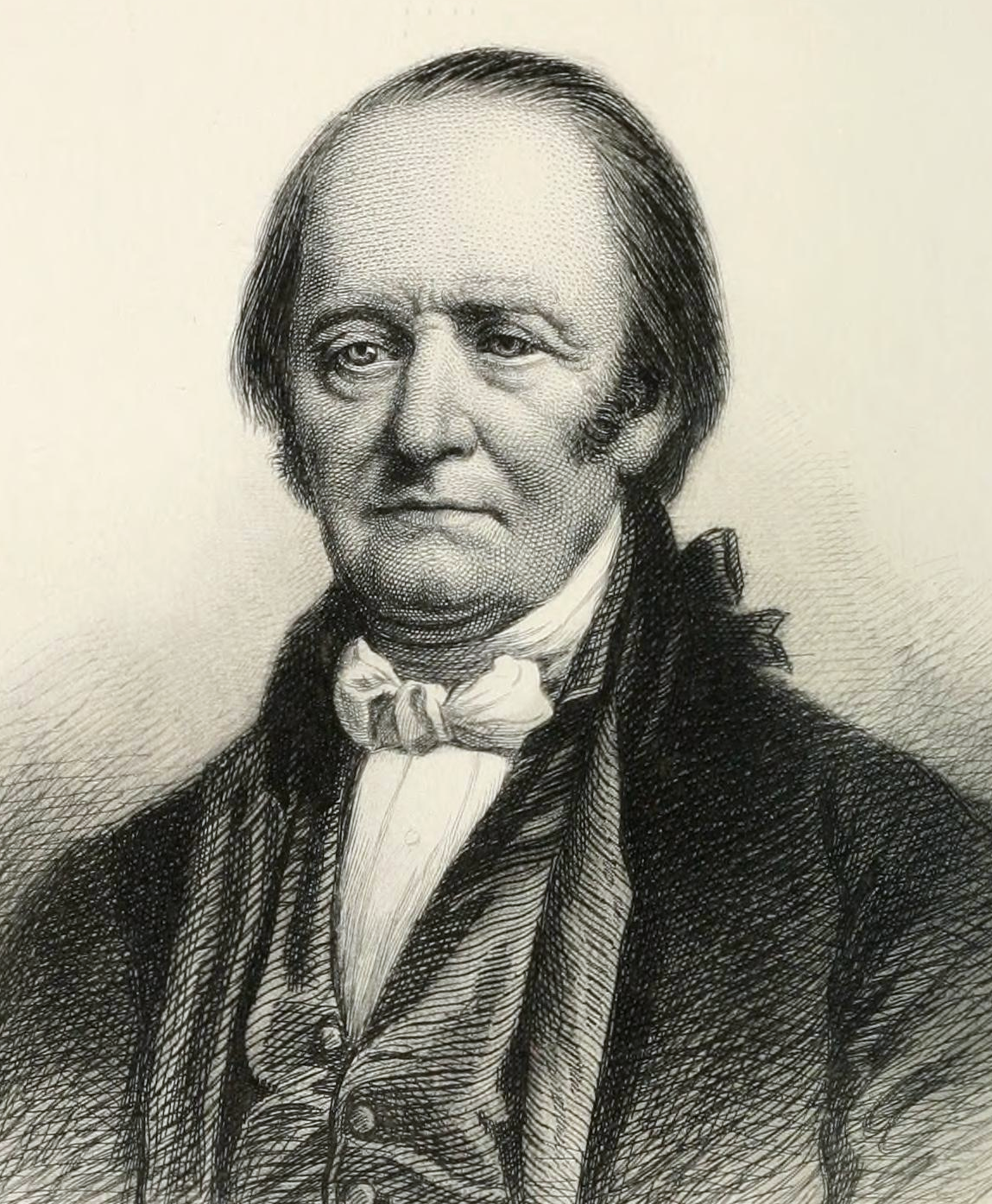
| Nominee | Thomas Chittenden |
| Party | Independent |
Governor before election
Thomas Chittenden
Independent
Elected Governor
Thomas Chittenden
Independent

The 1792 Vermont gubernatorial election took place on September 4, 1792. It resulted in the re-election of Governor Thomas Chittenden to a one-year term.

The Vermont General Assembly met in Rutland on October 11. The Vermont House of Representatives appointed a committee to examine the votes of the freemen of Vermont for governor, lieutenant governor, treasurer, and members of the governor's council.

In the race for governor, Thomas Chittenden, who had been governor from 1778 to 1789, and again starting in 1790, was re-elected for a one-year term. In the election for lieutenant governor, Peter Olcott was re-elected to a third one-year term. The freemen also re-elected Samuel Mattocks as treasurer, his sixth one-year term. The names of candidates and balloting totals for statewide offices were not recorded.

== Results ==
1792 Vermont gubernatorial election
| Party | Candidate | Votes | % |
|---|---|---|---|
| Nonpartisan | Thomas Chittenden (incumbent) | ** | ** |
