= 1781 Vermont Republic gubernatorial election =

- September 4, 1781
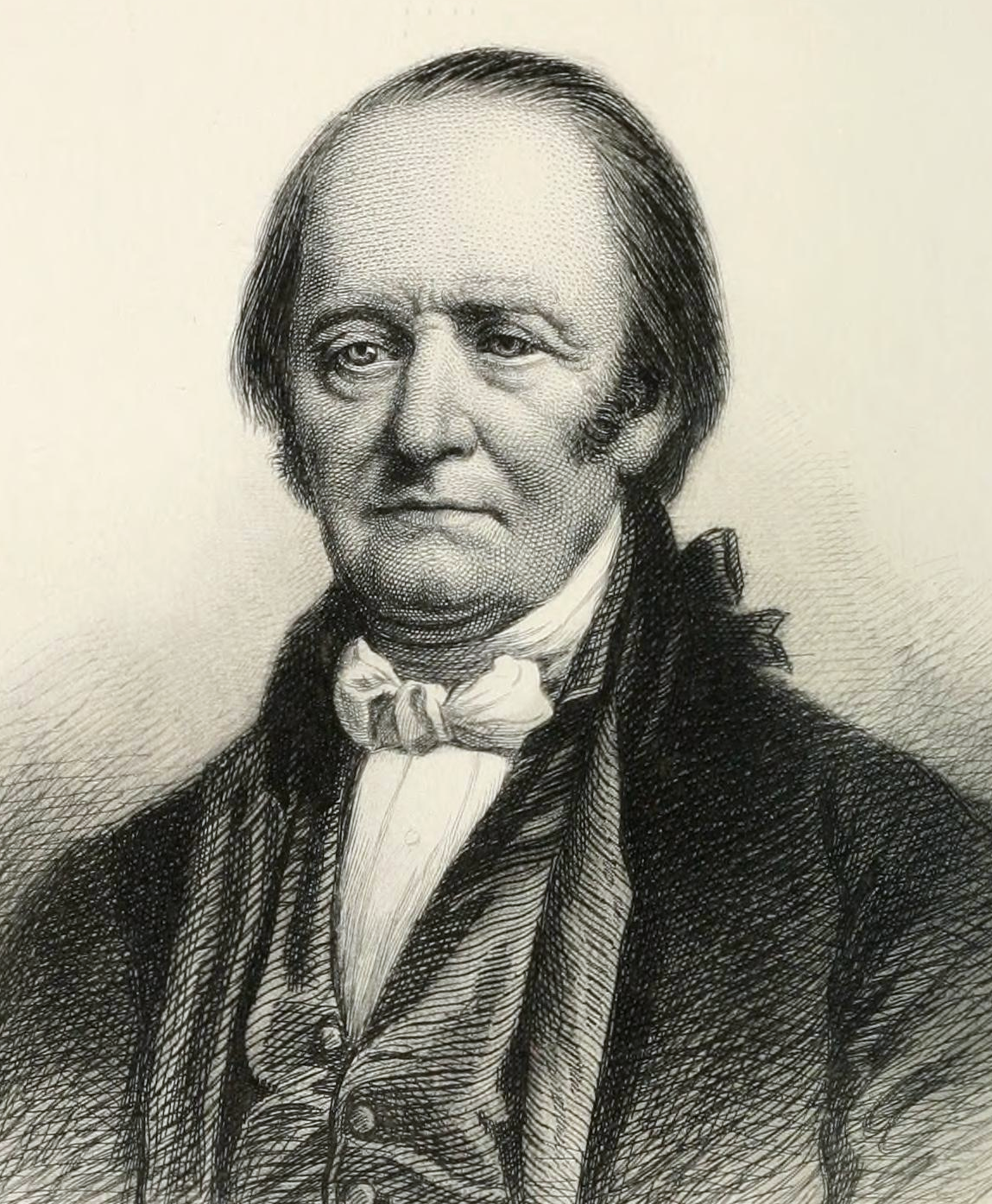
Nominee	Thomas Chittenden
Party	Independent
Governor before election
Thomas Chittenden
Independent
Elected Governor
Thomas Chittenden
Independent

The 1781 Vermont Republic gubernatorial election took place on September 4, 1781. It resulted in the re-election of Thomas Chittenden to a one-year term.

The Vermont General Assembly met in Charlestown, New Hampshire on October 12. The meeting site was chosen as part of a short-lived effort to create a union of Vermont with 17 Connecticut River Valley towns of New Hampshire.

The Vermont House of Representatives appointed a committee to examine the votes of the freemen of Vermont for governor, lieutenant governor, treasurer, and governor's council members. Thomas Chittenden was re-elected governor. The popular vote indicated that no candidate for lieutenant governor had received a majority. In keeping with the Vermont Constitution, the choice fell to the Vermont General Assembly, which chose Elisha Payne, a New Hampshire resident who supported the union of New Hampshire's western towns with Vermont. Ira Allen was re-elected as treasurer. The names of candidates and balloting totals were not recorded.

== Results ==
1781 Vermont Republic gubernatorial election
Party	Candidate	Votes	%
Nonpartisan	Thomas Chittenden (incumbent)	**	**
