= 1780 Vermont Republic gubernatorial election =

- September 5, 1780
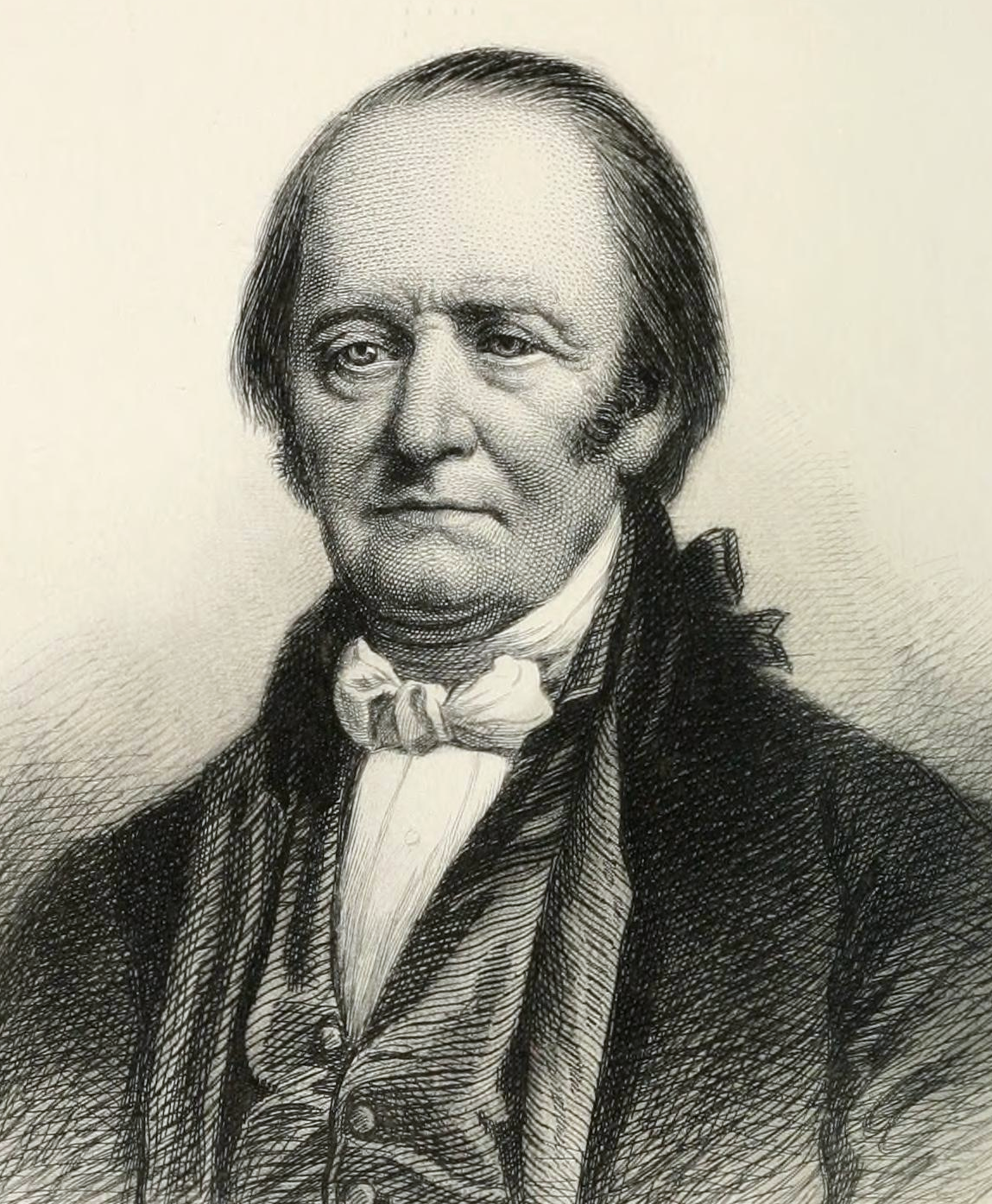
Nominee	Thomas Chittenden
Party	Independent
Governor before election
Thomas Chittenden
Independent
Elected Governor
Thomas Chittenden
Independent

The 1780 Vermont Republic gubernatorial election took place on September 5, 1780. It resulted in the re-election of Thomas Chittenden to a one-year term.

The Vermont General Assembly met in Bennington on October 12. The Vermont House of Representatives appointed a committee to examine the votes of the freemen of Vermont for governor, lieutenant governor, treasurer, and members of the governor's council. Thomas Chittenden was re-elected governor. Benjamin Carpenter was re-elected lieutenant governor, and Ira Allen was re-elected as treasurer. The names of candidates and balloting totals were not recorded.

== Results ==
1780 Vermont Republic gubernatorial election
Party	Candidate	Votes	%
Nonpartisan	Thomas Chittenden (incumbent)	**	**
