= 1791 Vermont gubernatorial election =

- September 6, 1791
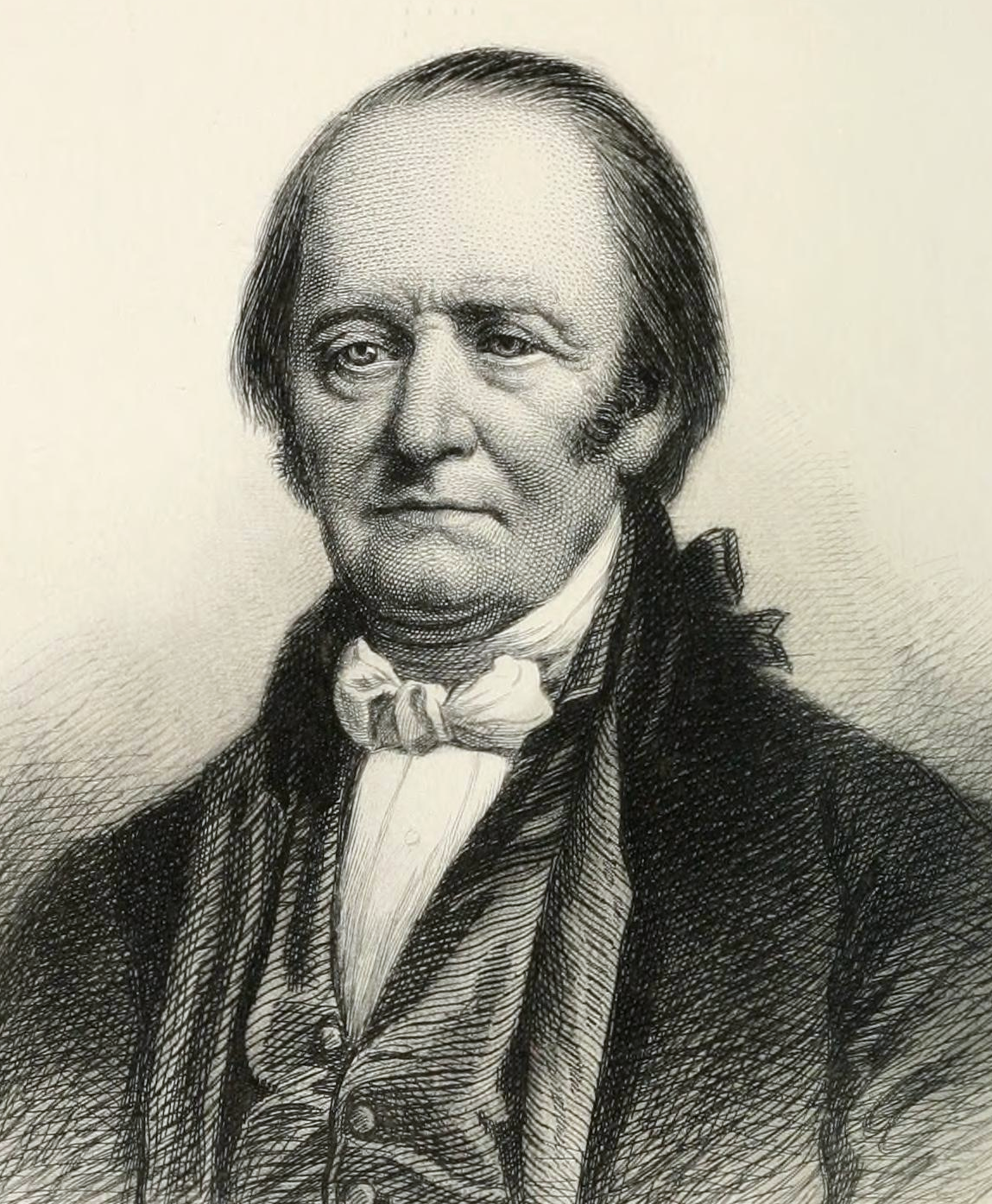
Nominee	Thomas Chittenden
Party	Independent
Governor before election
Thomas Chittenden
Independent
Elected Governor
Thomas Chittenden
Independent

The 1791 Vermont gubernatorial election, the first since Vermont joined the Union as the 14th state, took place on September 6, 1791. It resulted in the re-election of Governor Thomas Chittenden to a one-year term.

The Vermont General Assembly met in Windsor on October 13. The Vermont House of Representatives appointed a committee to examine the votes of the freemen of Vermont for governor, lieutenant governor, treasurer, and members of the governor's council. Vermont was admitted into the United States on March 4, 1791, and this was the first election for state offices since Vermont had become the 14th state.

In the race for governor, Thomas Chittenden, who had been governor from 1778 to 1789, and again starting in 1790, was re-elected for a one-year term. In the election for lieutenant governor, Peter Olcott was re-elected to a second one-year term. The freemen also re-elected Samuel Mattocks as treasurer, his fifth one-year term. The names of candidates and balloting totals for statewide offices were not recorded.

== Results ==
1791 Vermont gubernatorial election
Party	Candidate	Votes	%
Nonpartisan	Thomas Chittenden (incumbent)	**	**
