= 1796 Vermont gubernatorial election =

- September 6, 1796
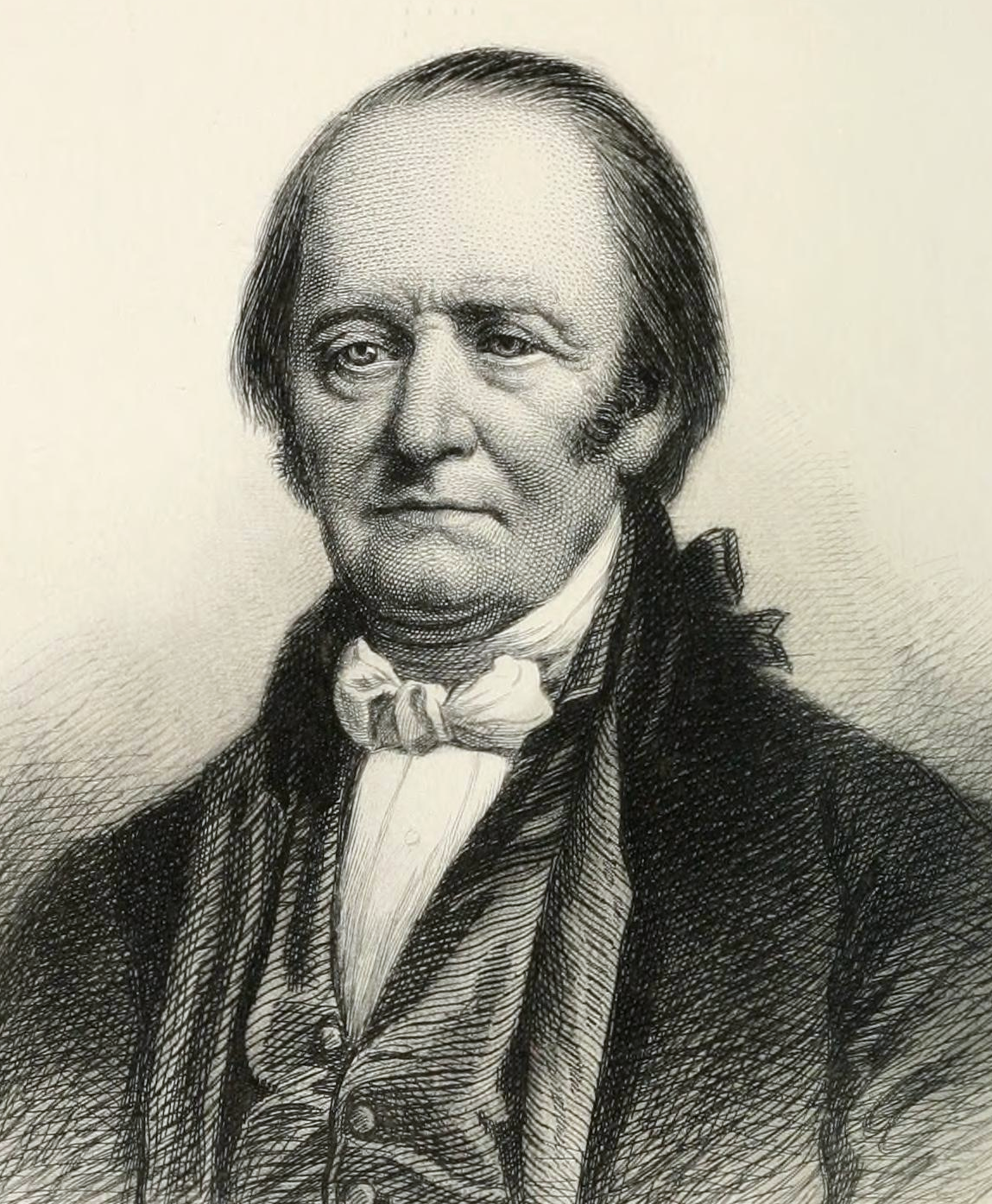
Nominee	Thomas Chittenden
Party	Independent
Governor before election
Thomas Chittenden
Independent
Elected Governor
Thomas Chittenden
Independent

The 1796 Vermont gubernatorial election took place on September 6, 1796. It resulted in the re-election of Governor Thomas Chittenden to a one-year term.

The Vermont General Assembly met in Rutland on October 13. The Vermont House of Representatives appointed a committee to examine the votes of the freemen of Vermont for governor, lieutenant governor, treasurer, and members of the governor's council.

In the race for governor, Thomas Chittenden, who had been governor from 1778 to 1789, and again starting in 1790, was re-elected for a one-year term. The freemen also re-elected Samuel Mattocks as treasurer, his tenth one-year term.

In the election for lieutenant governor, no candidate received a majority of the popular vote. As required by the Vermont Constitution, the General Assembly was required to choose. On October 14, the Assembly selected Paul Brigham for a one-year term. The names of candidates and balloting totals for statewide offices were not recorded.

== Results ==
1796 Vermont gubernatorial election
Party	Candidate	Votes	%
Independent	Thomas Chittenden (incumbent)		
