= Charles Mattocks =

American soldier, lawyer and politician (1840–1910)

Charles P. Mattocks
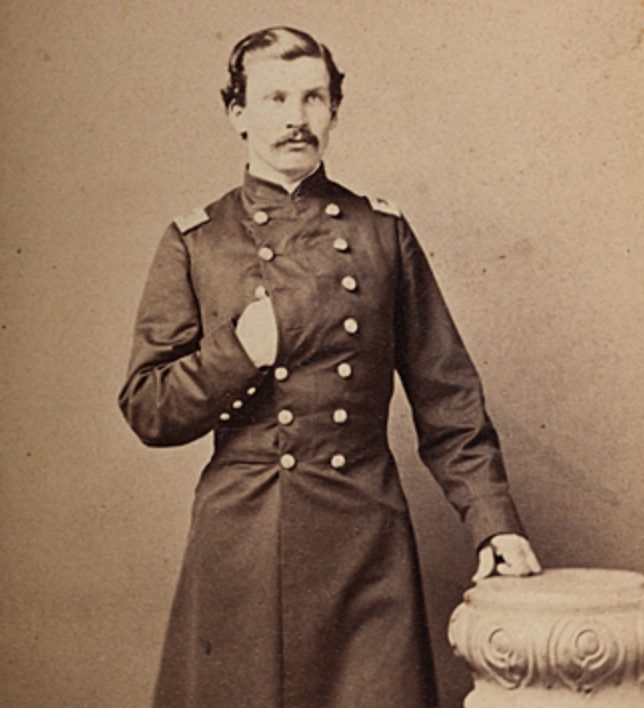
- Born: October 11, 1840; Danville, Vermont, US
- Died: May 16, 1910 (aged 69); Portland, Maine, US
- Burial place: Evergreen Cemetery (Portland, Maine)
- Education: Bowdoin College; Phillips Academy; Lewiston Falls Academy
- Spouse: Ella Robbins
- Children: Margaret, Mary
- Military career
- Allegiance: United States; Union
- Branch: United States Army; Union Army
- Service years: 1862–1865, 1898
- Rank: Brigadier general
- Unit: 17th Maine Volunteer Infantry Regiment
- Conflicts: American Civil War; Spanish–American War
- Awards: Medal of Honor

Charles Porter Mattocks (October 11, 1840 – May 16, 1910) was a colonel in the Union Army who received the Medal of Honor. He was born in Danville, Vermont, and served in the 17th Maine Infantry during the American Civil War. He was captured and interned as a prisoner of war for nine months. Later, he commanded the Maine State Militia and served as a brigadier general during the Spanish–American War. He was elected to the Maine House of Representatives in 1880, was a county attorney for Cumberland County, Maine, and argued a case before the Supreme Court.

== Early life and family ==
Mattocks was born in Danville, Vermont, on October 11, 1840, as the only son of Henry Mattocks and Martha Osgood Porter Mattocks. His father Henry was born in Middlebury, Vermont, on December 12, 1805, and worked as a merchant and banker for most of his life, including as a cashier at the Caledonia National Bank in Danville. He died in 1844, when Charles was three years old. (Note: According to the biography of the Maine State Museum, Martha later remarried Isaac Dyer and the family moved to Maine. Although the exact timing of this is unclear, they state simply that the family was in Baldwin, Maine, at the time of the 1860 United States census.)

Henry's brother, Samuel, also worked at the bank later on, as did Samuel's son. Charles's mother Martha was born in Danville, and married Henry in 1839. Samuel Mattocks, Charles's grandfather, was the former Vermont State Treasurer, and commanded a Connecticut company during the American Revolutionary War.

When Charles Mattocks was 10, his mother remarried to Isaac Dyer, a Maine lumberman, and moved with Charles to his home in Baldwin, Maine. Charles studied at Phillips Academy in Andover, Massachusetts, and Lewiston Falls Academy in Auburn, Maine. (Note: Later renamed Edward Little High School.) In 1858, Mattocks entered Bowdoin College in Brunswick, Maine, at the time a small college town, and graduated in 1862. During his school years, he was a member of both the Peucinian Society and Delta Kappa Epsilon, and studied elocution and German under professor Joshua Chamberlain. In 1861, Charles was elected by his peers as the Peucinian Orator, missing only 4 votes. In May of that year, at the beginning of the American Civil War, Mattocks formed a military company under the name of the "Bowdoin Guards." They were supplied arms and ammunition, but not uniforms, by the government. In all, 75 of the 144 students volunteered for the unit, to be commanded by Mattocks.

While at Bowdoin, Chamberlain "challenged him to bear down and live up to his potential." Chamberlain and Mattocks both enlisted in the Union Army in the summer of 1862, along with 25 other students, three of whom joined Charles in the 17th Maine Volunteers.

== Military service ==
=== American Civil War ===
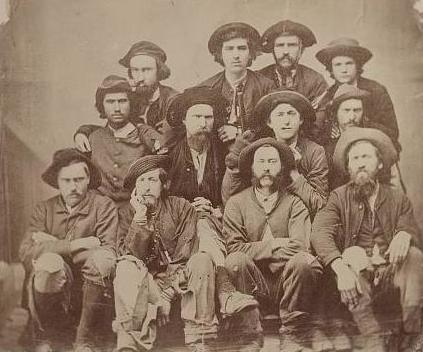
Union POW's

In 1862, upon his graduation from Bowdoin College, Mattocks enlisted in the Union Army. He was commissioned as a lieutenant of the 17th Maine Volunteer Infantry Regiment and fought with the Army of the Potomac in all its major battles, including the Battle of Fredericksburg, Battle of Chancellorsville and the Battle of Appomattox Court House. Mattocks began a journal on April 18, 1863, that he kept almost every day until June 14, 1865, detailing his experiences throughout the war. His regiment fought in the Battle of Chancellorsville, where his company lost 14 men and two officers. A few days after the battle, he and his company were mentioned by name in the official report written by Brigadier General J. H. Hobart Ward, commending "their valuable assistance and gallant conduct on the night of the 2d of May." On July 2, 1863, in the Wheatfield during the Battle of Gettysburg, his regiment lost over 100 soldiers. According to his letters to his mother, both men standing beside him had been killed. On July 22, Mattocks was chosen as a "Conscript Delegate," ordered to organize conscripts from Vermont, Maine, and Massachusetts that would eventually reinforce the 17th Maine.

In January 1864, the colonel of the 17th Maine Infantry Regiment was promoted and the lieutenant colonel was on detached duty. Mattocks was given command of the regiment for two months as a major. After the lieutenant colonel returned in March and took command as colonel, Mattocks had a short leave of absence.

Less than a week after Mattocks returned from leave in late March 1864, he was moved from the 17th Maine Infantry and placed in command of the 1st United States Sharpshooters. He commanded the 1st United States Sharpshooters in the Battle of the Wilderness, after which he was captured by the Confederate Army. He was a prisoner for six months, until he escaped the Confederate prison camp outside Columbia, South Carolina on November 3, 1864, alongside Captain Julius Litchfield and Lieutenant Charles Hunt, officers from other Maine regiments who were captured in the same battle. (Note: Litchfield was from the 4th Maine Volunteer Infantry Regiment, and Hunt from the 5th Maine Battery.) On their way back to Union territory, they trekked for two days without food before encountering a slave, who fed them "chicken, corn bread & potatoes." He also received material support from both Union and Confederate Freemasons while in prison camps and during his escape. Mattocks was recaptured 1.5 miles (2.4 km) from the Union lines, on November 28, by Cherokee scouts, then in service of the Confederacy. He was forced to walk over 100 miles (160 km) to Morgantown, West Virginia, where they were then transported by train to a prison camp in Danville, Virginia. (Note: One source has him at some point incarcerated at Libby Prison in Richmond, Virginia. While this was reportedly following his recapture, it is unclear whether this may have occurred before or after his term in Danville.) Mattocks was exchanged and released in late February, 1865. Rather than resuming his previous command of the 1st United States Sharpshooters, Mattocks was granted permission from the Secretary of War to rejoin the 17th Maine Infantry Regiment as major. Upon his return, he first served outside Petersburg, Virginia. After the fall of Petersburg, Mattocks led the regiment in the Appomattox Campaign and was distinguished in leading a charge at the Battle of Sailor's Creek. Sailor's Creek was the last battle of the American Civil War in which Mattocks participated. Three days later, on April 9, 1865, Confederate General Robert E. Lee surrendered the Army of Northern Virginia at Appomattox Court House.

Mattocks was appointed a brevet colonel of volunteers, to rank from April 9, 1865, for his actions in the Battle of Sailor's Creek on April 6, 1865, for which he also was awarded the Medal of Honor in 1899. He was appointed a full colonel of volunteers, to rank from May 15, 1865. Mattocks was mustered out of the volunteers with his regiment on June 4, 1865.

On February 21, 1867, President Andrew Johnson nominated Mattocks for appointment to the grade of brevet brigadier general of volunteers, to rank from March 13, 1865, for "faithful and meritorious services" during the war, and the United States Senate confirmed the appointment on March 2, 1867.

Regarding his command style, one of his enlisted soldiers, John Haley, wrote after the war that, "I can't think of any officer I'd sooner part with, for he was very pompous and had yards and yards of superfluous red tape about him."

==== Medal of Honor ====
On April 6, 1865, Major Mattocks led his regiment in a charge during the Battle of Sailor's Creek. His regiment of 220 men captured two stands of colors, two pieces of artillery, about 300 prisoners, and a loaded wagon train. He was awarded the Medal of Honor on March 29, 1899.

The President of the United States of America, in the name of Congress, takes pleasure in presenting the Medal of Honor to Major Charles Porter Mattocks, United States Army, for extraordinary heroism on 6 April 1865, while serving with 17th Maine Infantry, in action at Deatonsville (Sailor's Creek), Virginia. Major Mattocks displayed extraordinary gallantry in leading a charge of his regiment which resulted in the capture of a large number of prisoners and a stand of colors.

==== Timeline ====
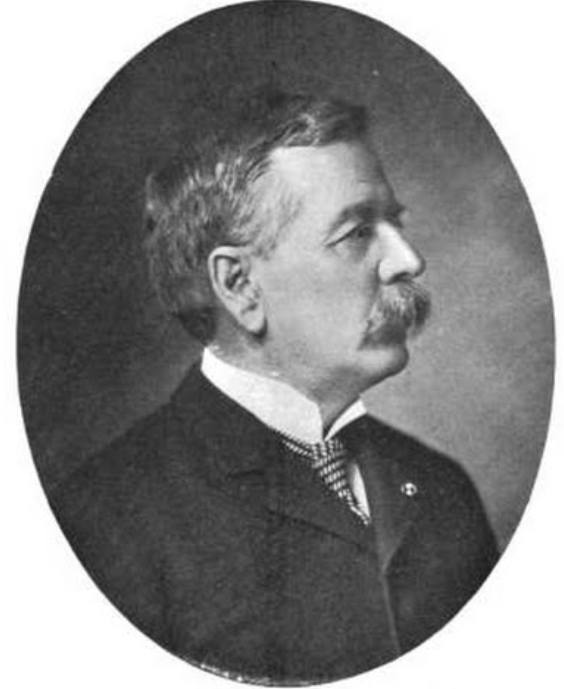
Judge Charles Mattocks, c. 1903

- Commissioned first lieutenant July 31, 1862. (Note: One source states simply that he was "mustered into the 17th Maine, Company A, as 1st lieutenant on August 21, 1862.")
- Promoted to captain, Company A, December 4, 1862.
- Promoted to major, December 22, 1863.
- Assigned to command the 1st Berdan USS, by order of Major General William Birney on May 5, 1864.
- Captured at the Battle of the Wilderness, May 5, 1864.
- Prisoner of war until March 22, 1865.
- Appointed brevet-colonel of US Volunteers for "gallant and meritorious conduct at the battle of Amelia Springs"; promoted to lieutenant colonel.
- Promoted to Colonel, 17th Maine, May 9, 1865.
- Mustered out with the regiment, June 4, 1865.

=== Other engagements ===
After the Civil War, Mattocks entered the Maine State Militia as a captain in 1868. In 1879, he was promoted to colonel, commanding all infantry in the state.

During the Spanish–American War, Mattocks served as a Brigadier General of Volunteers in the United States Army, commanding the 3rd Brigade of the 2nd Division under Major General James F. Wade. The regiments under him were the 1st Maine Volunteer Infantry, 52nd Iowa Volunteer Infantry, and the 1st Mississippi Volunteer Infantry. Mattocks was ordered to take command of the regiments at Chickamauga, Georgia, but the war ended before he was able to take part in the action.

On October 7, 1898, Mattocks along with 28 other generals were honorably discharged from the volunteer army of the United States by the War Department. This was not due to the performance of the generals, but rather because the size of the army had been reduced by 50%, and there was no longer a need for such a large number of officers.

== Post–Civil War ==
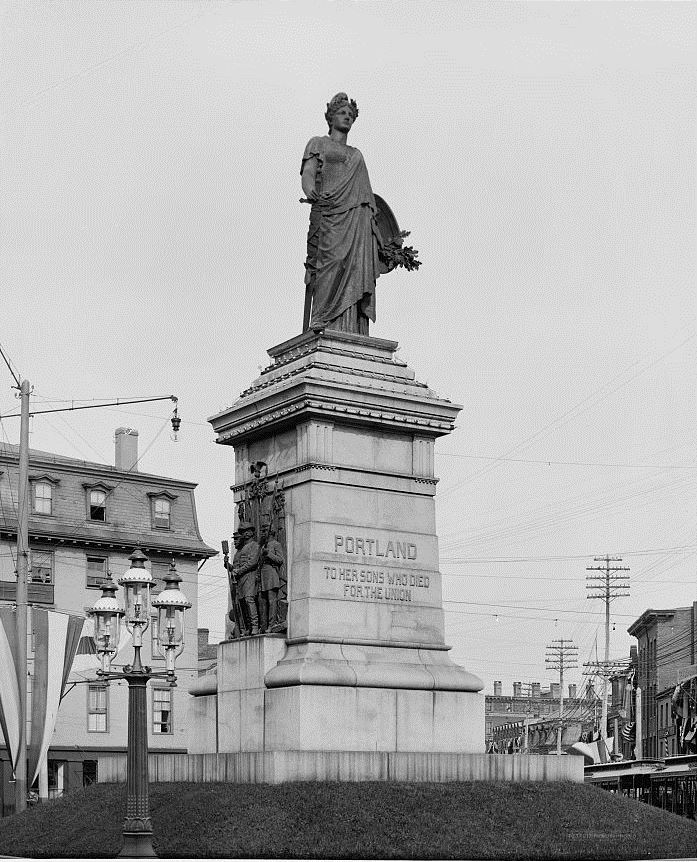
Portland Soldiers and Sailors Monument, also known as Our Lady of Victories, c. 1895

Mattocks attended Harvard Law School, studied under Edward Fox, and graduated in 1867. On June 27, 1871, he married Ella R. Robinson, daughter of Augustus Robinson, in Portland, Maine. He then opened a law office in Portland, and in 1869, became county attorney for Cumberland County, Maine. He held the position from 1870 to 1873. He represented Jones in the U.S. Supreme Court case of Morrill v. Jones (1883).

Mattocks maintained a large farm in Baldwin, Maine.

Mattocks was an active member of the executive committee of the Union Soldiers and Sailors, a post-war veterans group campaigning against the Democratic Party. Mattocks was a Freemason, as well as an Adjutant General and Department Commander in the Grand Army of the Republic in Maine. He was also one of the first members of the Military Order of the Loyal Legion.

Mattocks, along with 20 other Maine veterans, was appointed to the Portland Soldiers' and Sailors' Monument Association, in order to supervise the creation of the Our Lady of Victories monument, memorializing Portland soldiers and sailors who died during the Civil War. (Note: The monument was added to the National Register of Historic Places in 1998.) He also acted as the orator to introduce a statue of Major General Joseph Hooker, erected in Massachusetts. In 1880, Mattocks was elected to the Maine House of Representatives, as a Republican, and served there for four years. (Note: The Maine Legislature's database records his years of service as 1883 to 1886. However, his obituaries from Bowdoin College and the American Bar Association record his dates of service as 1880–1884.) He was appointed Inspector-General on Governor Frederick Robie's staff on January 12, 1883. Mattocks was appointed judge of probate for Cumberland County in December 1900.

=== World's Columbian Exposition ===
In 1893, Mattocks served as executive commissioner from Maine to the World's Columbian Exposition in Chicago. He was in charge of the creation and execution of Maine's building for the exposition. It was described by Campbell's Illustrated Weekly as "one of peculiar shape, being somewhat irregular and running to a point" and designed to be different from any other State's building. It was built with granite and slate, much of which was donated by Maine quarrymen.

=== Death and legacy ===
Mattocks died at 17 Lewis Street in Portland, Maine, on May 16, 1910, from nephritis. He was buried in Evergreen Cemetery with full military honors. After his death, his wife, Ella Mattocks, was paid $50 monthly as part of Charles's military pension. In 1955, the Charles P. Mattocks Scholarship was established at Bowdoin College. The Brown Memorial Library in Baldwin, Maine, also home to the Baldwin Historical Society, was established in 1907 based on a tract of land originally donated by Mattocks.

== Publications ==
- Mattocks, Charles (1878). Annual poultry list. Portland, Maine. OCLC 30100834.
- Mattocks, Charles (1894). "Maine at the World's Fair". The New England Magazine Volume 10; Volume 16. New England Magazine Company. pp. 295–309.
- Mattocks, Charles (1894). Racine, Philip N. (ed.). Unspoiled Heart: The Journal of Charles Mattocks of the 17th Maine. University of Tennessee Press. ISBN 978-0-87049-834-3.

== See also ==
- List of American Civil War brevet generals (Union)
- List of American Civil War Medal of Honor recipients
- List of Harvard Law School alumni
- Maine in the American Civil War
