= 1779 Vermont Republic gubernatorial election =

- September 7, 1779
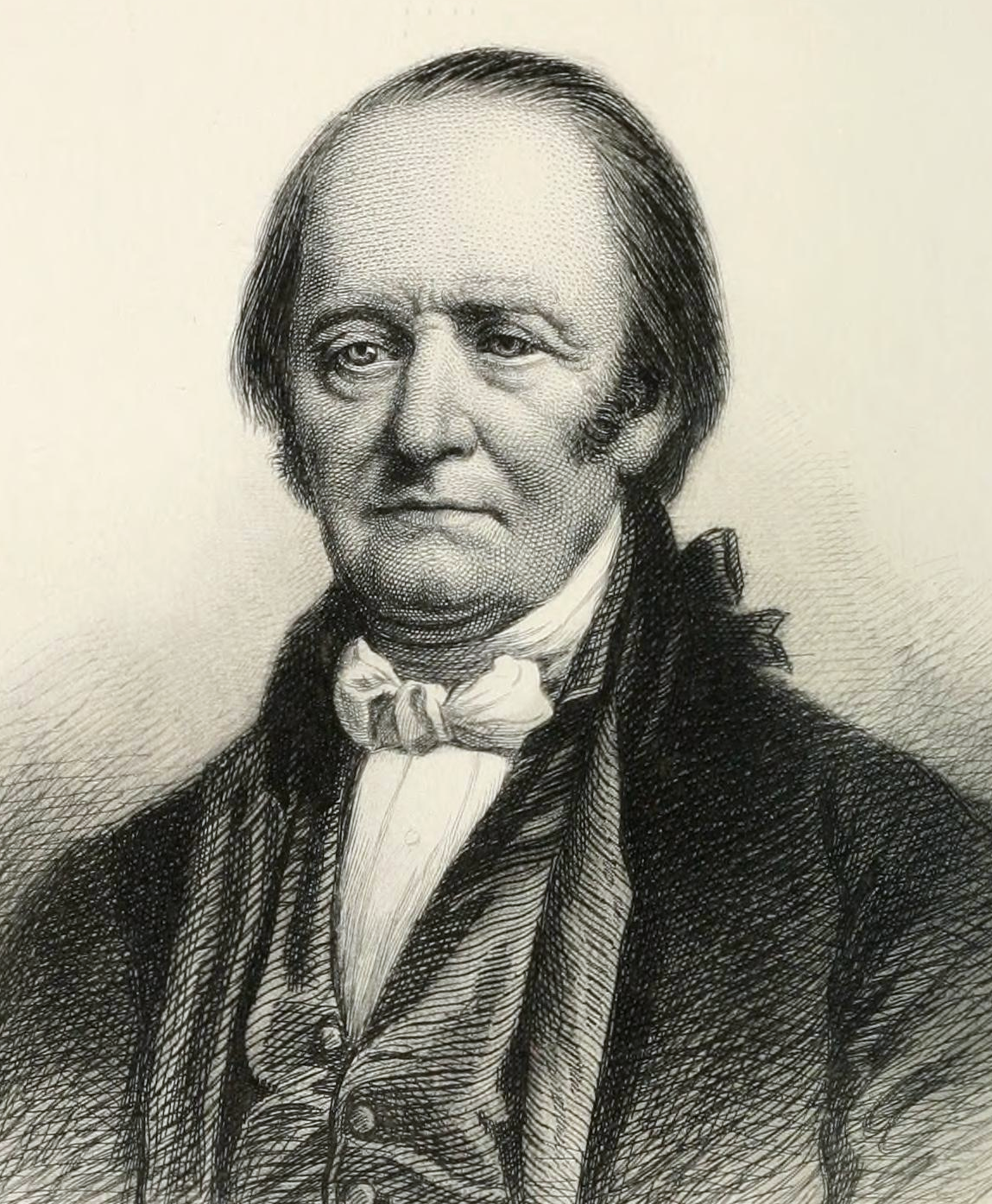
Nominee	Thomas Chittenden
Party	Independent
Governor before election
Thomas Chittenden
Independent
Elected Governor
Thomas Chittenden
Independent

A gubernatorial election was held in the Vermont Republic on September 7, 1779. The incumbent governor of Vermont, Thomas Chittenden, was re-elected, with no recorded votes for other candidates.

== General election ==
1779 Vermont Republic gubernatorial election
Party	Candidate	Votes	%
Nonpartisan	Thomas Chittenden (incumbent)	**	**
Total votes		**	**

== Bibliography ==
- Dubin, Michael J. (2003). United States Gubernatorial Elections, 1776–1860: The Official Results by State and County. Jefferson, NC: McFarland and Company.
- Walton, E. P., ed. (1874). Records of the Governor and Council of the State of Vermont. Vol. 2. Montpelier.
