= September 1778 Vermont Republic gubernatorial election =

- September 1, 1778
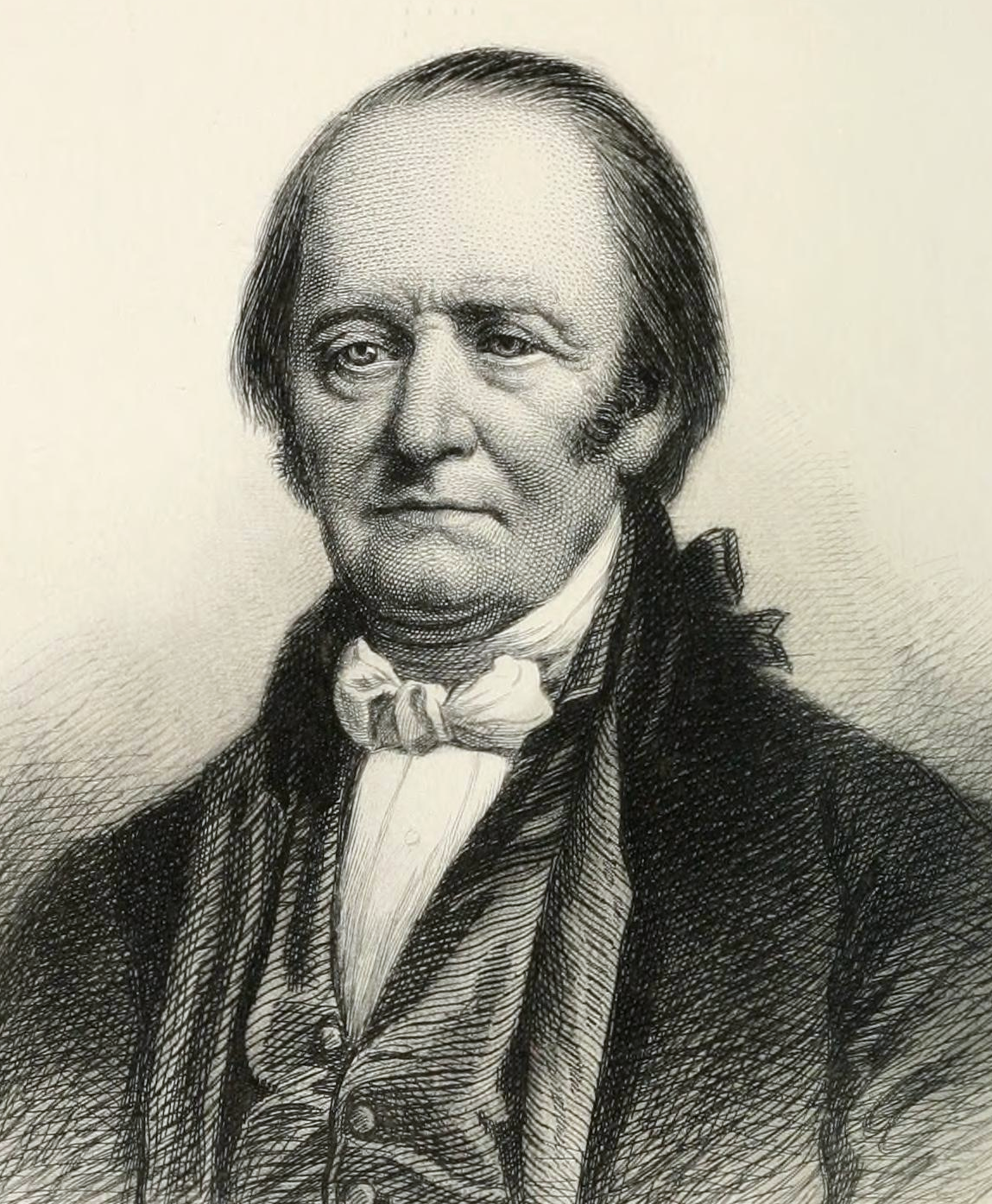
Nominee	Thomas Chittenden
Party	Independent
Governor before election
Thomas Chittenden
Independent
Elected Governor
Thomas Chittenden
Independent

A gubernatorial election was held in the Vermont Republic on September 1, 1778. The incumbent governor of Vermont, Thomas Chittenden, was re-elected, with no recorded votes for other candidates.

== General election ==
September 1778 Vermont Republic gubernatorial election
Party	Candidate	Votes	%
Nonpartisan	Thomas Chittenden	**	**
Total votes		**	**

== Bibliography ==
- Dubin, Michael J. (2003). United States Gubernatorial Elections, 1776–1860: The Official Results by State and County. Jefferson, NC: McFarland and Company.
- Slade, William, ed. (1823). "Journal of the General Assembly of the State of Vermont, October 1778". Vermont State Papers [...] Middlebury.
