= March 1778 Vermont Republic gubernatorial election =

- March 12, 1778
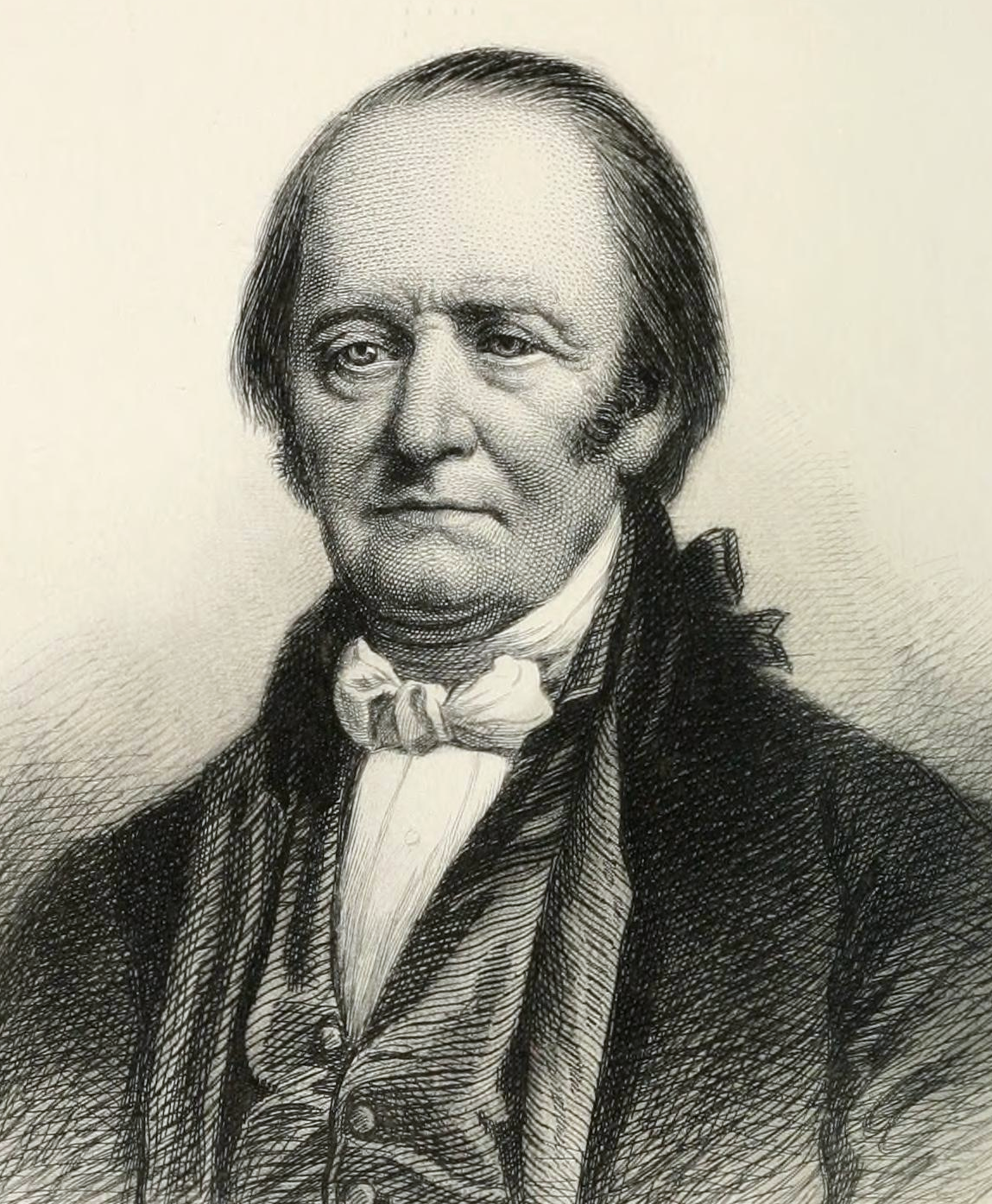
Nominee	Thomas Chittenden
Party	Independent
Governor before election
None
Elected Governor
Thomas Chittenden
Independent

A gubernatorial election was held in the Vermont Republic on March 3, 1778. The president of the Council of Safety Thomas Chittenden was elected "by a great majority," with no recorded votes for other candidates. This was the first gubernatorial election held in Vermont following the Vermont Declaration of Independence.

== General election ==
March 1778 Vermont Republic gubernatorial election
Party	Candidate	Votes	%
Nonpartisan	Thomas Chittenden	**	**
Total votes		**	**

== Bibliography ==
- Dubin, Michael J. (2003). United States Gubernatorial Elections, 1776–1860: The Official Results by State and County. Jefferson, NC: McFarland and Company.
- Slade, William, ed. (1823). "Journal of the General Assembly of the State of Vermont, March 1778". Vermont State Papers [...] Middlebury.
- White, Mrs. W. R. (November 1, 1916). "Vermont From the Election of Thomas Chittenden Through the War of 1812". Daughters of the American Revolution Magazine. pp. 311–14.
