= Peter Olcott =

American judge (1733–1808)

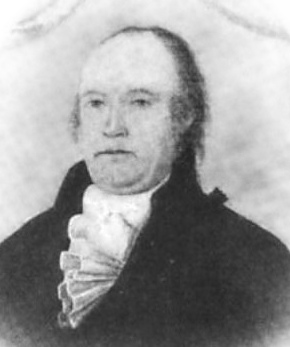

1st Lieutenant Governor of the state of Vermont
- In office 1791–1794
- Preceded by: Himself (as lieutenant governor of the Vermont Republic)
- Succeeded by: Jonathan Hunt

6th Lieutenant Governor of Vermont (Independent Republic)
- In office 1790–1791
- Preceded by: Joseph Marsh
- Succeeded by: Himself (as Lieutenant Governor of the state of Vermont)

Personal details
- Born: April 25, 1733 Bolton, Connecticut Colony
- Died: September 12, 1808 (aged 75) Hanover, New Hampshire, US
- Resting place: Meeting House Hill Cemetery; Norwich; Windsor County, Vermont
- Spouse: Sarah Mills Olcott
- Children: Pelatiah Olcott; Peter Olcott; Timothy, Olcott; Roswell Olcott; Sarah Olcott; Margaret Olcott; Margaret Olcott; Mills Olcott; Martha
- Profession: Judge; Politician

Military service
- Years of service: 1781 to 1788
- Rank: Colonel; Brigadier General
- Unit: Vermont militia's Third Brigade
- Battles/wars: American Revolution; Bennington; Saratoga

Peter Olcott (April 25, 1733 – September 12, 1808) was a Vermont public official and military officer who served as a brigadier general in the colonial militia, the sixth lieutenant governor of the Vermont Republic, and the first lieutenant governor of the state of Vermont.

== Early life ==
Peter was born in Bolton, Connecticut Colony, and was the first of four children (2 sons and 2 daughters) born of Titus Olcott and his wife Damarus Eggleston, widow of John Marshell.

Olcott moved to Norwich, province of New Hampshire, in the early 1770s and served in numerous local offices, including Overseer of the Poor, Justice of the Peace and County Judge.

== Career ==
Olcott was active during the American Revolution. He served as Sequestration Commissioner for Tory Property in 1777 and was a member of the Vermont House of Representatives in 1778. He was a colonel in the Vermont militia, and his regiment took part in the Battles of Bennington and Saratoga. From 1781 to 1788 Olcott was commander of the Vermont militia's Third Brigade with the rank of brigadier general.

Olcott was a member of the Governor's Council in 1779, and again from 1781 to 1790. He served on the Vermont Supreme Court from 1782 to 1784. He was Vermont's lieutenant governor from 1790 to 1794, and served in the Vermont House again in 1801. Olcott was also a trustee of Dartmouth College from 1788 until his death.

== Death ==
Olcott died in Hanover, Grafton County, New Hampshire, on September 12, 1808 (age 75 years, 140 days). He is interred at Meeting House Hill Cemetery, Norwich, Windsor County, Vermont.

== Family life ==
Son of Deacon Titus Olcott, he married Sarah Mills on October 11, 1759, and they had nine children, Pelatiah, Peter, Timothy, Roswell, Sarah, Margaret, Margaret, Mills, and Martha.

Preceded by Joseph Marsh	6th Lieutenant Governor of Vermont (Independent Republic); 1790–1794	Succeeded by Jonathan Hunt
