= Joseph Marsh =

Vermont officer in the American Revolution and lieutenant governor

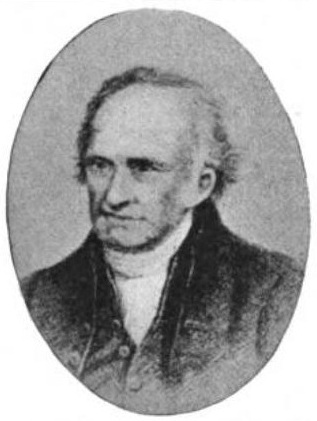
Joseph Marsh

Joseph Marsh (January 12, 1726 – February 9, 1811) was a Vermont politician and military officer who fought in the American Revolution and served as lieutenant governor of Vermont.

== Biography ==
Joseph Marsh was born in Lebanon, Connecticut, on January 12, 1726. He moved to Hartford, Vermont, in 1772 and was a prominent farmer, landowner and businessman.

Marsh took part in the American Revolution, commanding a militia regiment as Lieutenant Colonel and Colonel, and took part in the garrisoning of Fort Ticonderoga after its capture from the British, as well as the Battle of Bennington. In 1777 he took part in the New York Provincial Congress. (At the time, authority over Vermont was the subject of dispute between New Hampshire and New York).

In 1777 Marsh was a member of the Windsor convention that enacted the Constitution forming the Vermont Republic, and served as the convention's vice president.

In 1778 he was elected Lieutenant Governor, the first individual to hold the office, and he served until 1779. Also in 1778 Marsh was appointed Judge of the Confiscation Court for eastern Vermont. (The confiscation courts were formed to rule on whether defendants were loyal to the United States. Those determined to be Tories had their property confiscated so it could be sold at auction to support the operation of Vermont's government.)

From 1781 to 1782 Marsh was a member of the Vermont House of Representatives.

In 1785 Marsh was a member of Vermont's Council of Censors.

From 1787 to 1795 Marsh served as Judge of the Windsor County Court. He also returned to the Lieutenant Governor's office in 1787, serving until 1790.

Marsh died in Quechee, Vermont, on February 9, 1811. He was buried in Quechee's Hilltop Cemetery.

Marsh's descendants included his son Charles Marsh and grandsons James Marsh and George Perkins Marsh.

Preceded by New position	Lieutenant Governor of Vermont (Independent Republic); 1778–1779	Succeeded by Benjamin Carpenter
Preceded by Paul Spooner	Lieutenant Governor of Vermont (Independent Republic); 1787–1790	Succeeded by Peter Olcott
