= Samuel Mattocks =

American politician (1739–1804)

2nd Vermont State Treasurer
- In office 1786–1800
- Preceded by: Ira Allen
- Succeeded by: Benjamin Swan

Member of the Vermont Governor's Council
- In office 1785–1786
- Preceded by: Thomas Porter
- Succeeded by: John Fassett Jr.

Member of the Vermont House of Representatives
- In office 1781–1784
- Preceded by: Solomon Bingham
- Succeeded by: Nathaniel Chipman
- Constituency: Tinmouth

Chief Judge of the Rutland County, Vermont Court
- In office 1789–1790
- Preceded by: Increase Moseley
- Succeeded by: Ebenezer Marvin

Assistant Judge of the Rutland County, Vermont Court
- In office 1795–1796 Serving with Abel Cooper
- Preceded by: Lemuel Chipman, Samuel Williams
- Succeeded by: Ebenezer Wilson, Jonas Safford
- In office 1784–1789 Serving with William Ward
- Preceded by: Joseph Bowker, Benjamin Ward, William Whipple
- Succeeded by: Lemuel Chipman, Simeon Smith

Personal details
- Born: December 30, 1739 Middletown, Connecticut Colony, British North America
- Died: January 18, 1804 (aged 64) Middlebury, Vermont, U.S.
- Resting place: Washington Street Cemetery, Middlebury, Vermont, U.S.
- Spouse: Sarah Birdwell (or Burdell) (m. 1763)
- Children: 5 (including John Mattocks)
- Relatives: Charles Mattocks (grandson)
- Occupation: Farmer

Military service
- Allegiance: United States
- Service: Continental Army
- Years of service: 1777–1780
- Rank: Captain
- Unit: 8th Connecticut Regiment
- Commands: Samuel Mattocks' Company, 8th Connecticut Regiment
- Wars: American Revolutionary War

Samuel Mattocks (December 30, 1739 – January 18, 1804) was a Connecticut and Vermont Continental Army officer and political figure who served as Vermont State Treasurer during the state's early years.

== Early life ==
Samuel Mattocks was born in Middletown, Connecticut on December 30, 1739. He was living in Hartford and owned a wig-making shop when he joined the Army for the American Revolution.

== American Revolution ==
He was a member of the 8th Connecticut Regiment, commanding a company with the rank of captain. The regiment took part in action throughout New York, Pennsylvania and New Jersey, and Mattocks served until resigning in 1780, when he moved to Tinmouth, Vermont.

== Life in Vermont ==
Mattocks farmed and also became active in politics and government. He served in the Vermont House of Representatives from 1781 to 1784, and was a member of the Governor's Council in 1785. He was Assistant Judge of Rutland County from 1783 to 1788, Chief Judge from 1788 to 1793, and Assistant Judge again in 1794. From 1786 to 1800 Mattocks was Vermont's State Treasurer, and in 1792 he was a member of the Council of Censors. His term as Treasurer bridged the period from the founding of the Vermont Republic until Vermont achieved statehood in 1791.

== Death and burial ==
Mattocks moved to Middlebury in 1797, and resided there until his death. He died on January 18, 1804, and was buried in Middlebury's Washington Street Cemetery.

== Family ==
Samuel Mattocks married Sarah Birdwell (or Burdell) on March 14, 1763. Their children included: Samuel Mattocks Jr. (1764-1823), who was an innkeeper in Middlebury and served in local office; Sarah (1767–1778); Rebecca (1768–1841), the wife of Samuel Miller of Middlebury; Mary (1770–1777); and John (1777–1847).

John Mattocks served in the United States House of Representatives and was Governor of Vermont from 1843 to 1844.

Political offices
Preceded by Ira Allen	Vermont State Treasurer; 1786–1800	Succeeded by Benjamin Swan
