= Paul Spooner =

American judge (1746–1789)

4th Lieutenant Governor of the Vermont Republic
- In office 1782–1787
- Preceded by: Elisha Payne
- Succeeded by: Joseph Marsh

Associate Justice of the Vermont Supreme Court
- In office 1779–1789
- Preceded by: John Shepardson
- Succeeded by: Nathaniel Chipman

Personal details
- Born: March 20, 1746; Dartmouth, Massachusetts
- Died: September 4, 1789 (aged 43); North Hartland, Vermont
- Resting place: Cutts Cemetery, North Hartland, Vermont
- Spouse(s): Asenath Wright (m. 1770-1777, her death); Anna Cogswell (m. 1779-1789, his death)
- Children: 3
- Profession: Physician

Paul Spooner (March 20, 1746 – September 4, 1789) was a Vermont political figure who served as lieutenant governor.

== Early life ==
Paul Spooner was born in Dartmouth, Massachusetts on March 20, 1746. He was the youngest of the 10 children of Elizabeth (Ruggles) and Daniel Spooner. He was raised in Petersham, Massachusetts, studied medicine, and moved to Hartland, Vermont to begin a medical practice in 1768.

== Career ==
In 1775, Spooner was a delegate to the New York Provincial Congress. (At the time jurisdiction over Vermont was the subject of a dispute between New Hampshire and New York.

Spooner served as a member of Vermont's Revolutionary War Council of Safety from 1778 to 1782. In 1779 he was elected Hartland's Town Clerk, and he also served as Hartland's Town Meeting Moderator.

From 1779 to 1789 Spooner served as a justice of the Vermont Supreme Court.

In 1780 and 1781 Spooner was Windsor County's Probate Judge, and from 1780 to 1782 he was one of Vermont's agents who negotiated with the Continental Congress.

In 1782 he became lieutenant governor, and he served until 1787. He was Assistant Judge of the Windsor County Superior Court from 1779 to 1782, Chief Judge from 1784 to 1785, and Assistant Judge again from 1785 until his death.

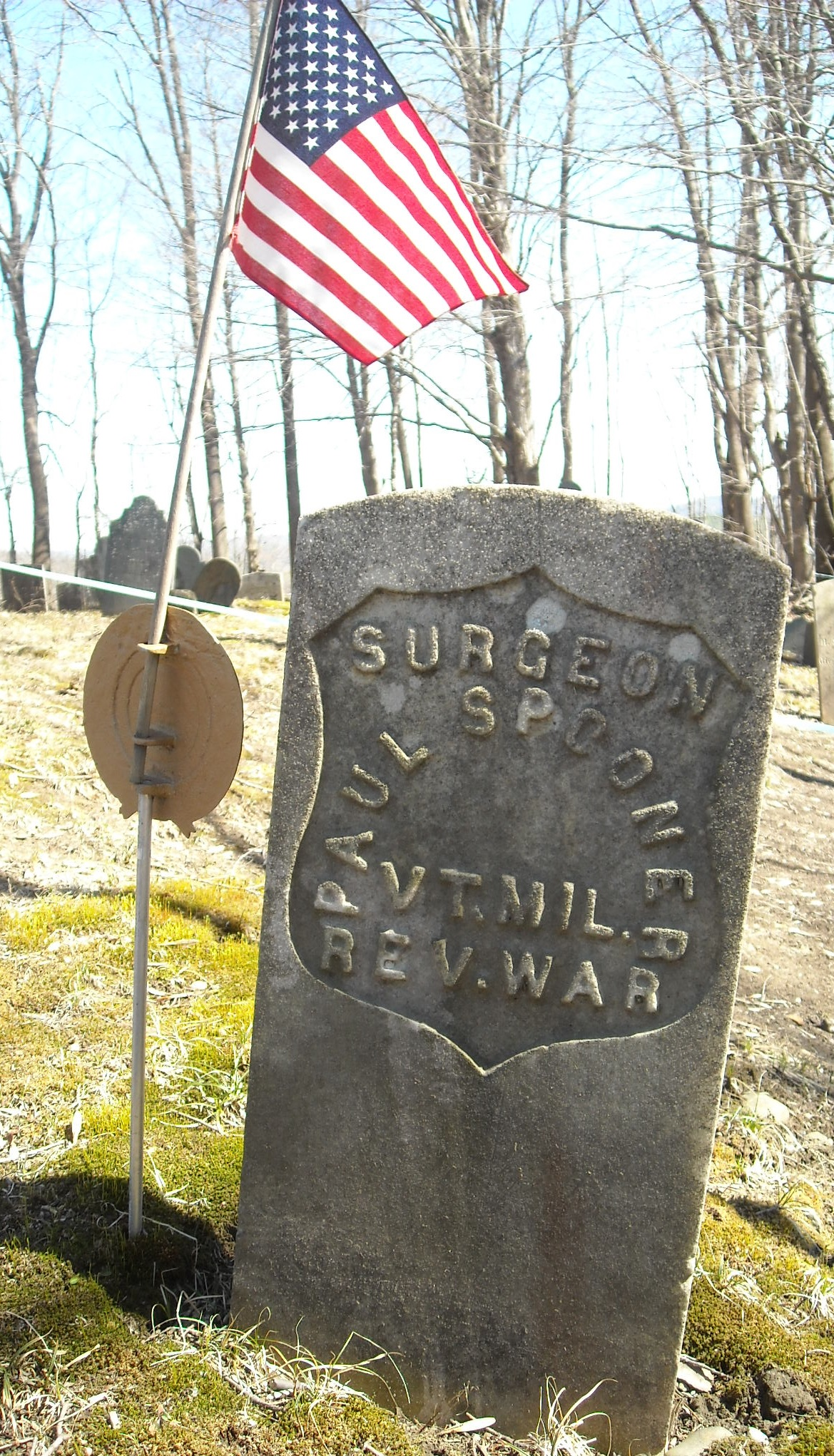
Grave of Lieut. Governor Paul Spooner located in Cutts cemetery, North Hartland Vermont

Spooner died at the age of 44 in North Hartland on September 4, 1789. His home can still be found in North Hartland, very close to Cutts Cemetery where he is buried.

== Family ==
Dr. Spooner married Asenath Wright on April 15, 1770. They had three children before her death in March, 1777. Daughter Elizabeth (Betsy) (1770-1853) was the wife of David Denny (1764-1821) of Northfield, Vermont, and the mother of nine children. Their sons were Paul S. (b. 1772) and Amasa (b. 1774). In 1779, he married a cousin, Anna Cogswell (d. 1800), who was the widow of Captain Jeremiah Post (d. 1777) of Orford, New Hampshire. Paul and Anna Spooner had no children.

Paul S. Spooner was an early settler of Hardwick, and served as town clerk and a member of the Vermont House of Representatives.

Preceded by Elisha Payne	Lieutenant Governor of Vermont (Independent Republic); 1782–1787	Succeeded by Joseph Marsh
