= Ira Allen =

American politician

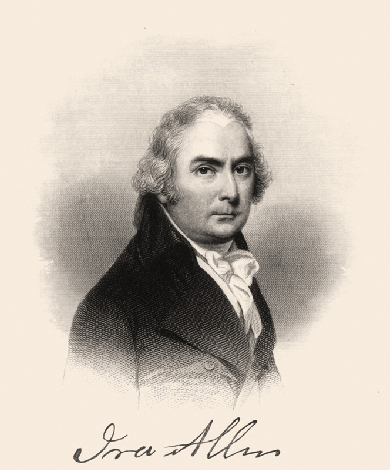
- Engraving of Ira Allen, c. 1810
- Born: April 21, 1751; Cornwall, Connecticut Colony
- Died: January 7, 1814 (aged 62); Philadelphia, Pennsylvania, United States
- Occupations: Surveyor, politician, military officer
- Relatives: Ethan Allen (brother)

Ira Allen (21 April [O.S. 10 April] 1751 – January 7, 1814) was an American revolutionary leader, founder of Vermont, and one of the Green Mountain Boys during the American colonial period. He was the younger brother of Ethan Allen.

== Biography ==
The Great Seal of the State of Vermont

Ira Allen was born in Cornwall in the Connecticut Colony (in present-day Litchfield County, Connecticut), the youngest of eight children born to Joseph and Mary Baker Allen. In 1771, Allen went to Vermont (then part of the British colonial Province of New York) with his brother Ethan as a surveyor for the Onion River Land Company. The four Allen brothers established the company in 1772 (dissolved 1785) to purchase lands under the New Hampshire Grants. Ira Allen had an almost central role in the dispute with the Province of New York over conflicting land claims in the region such as by gifting land to men who had committed acts for New Hampshire, and by confiscating loyalist property to finance government.

During the American Revolutionary War, Allen was a member of the Vermont Legislature in 1776–1777 and a leading figure in the declaration of the Vermont Republic in 1777, which was originally intended to be independent of both the British colonies and the newly-founded United States. Late in the war, he and his brother Ethan, along with Thomas Chittenden and others, were involved in the Haldimand Affair by their discussions with Frederick Haldimand, the British Governor of the Province of Quebec, about the possibility of reinstating Vermont as a British province.

An alternate explanation is that the Allen brothers were not actually interested in returning Vermont to the British but merely used the Haldimand negotiations to stave off a British invasion of Vermont from Canada and to prod the Continental Congress into recognizing Vermont as separate from New York and New Hampshire and admitting it to the United States. Vermont was granted statehood in 1791.

Allen designed the Great Seal of Vermont. In 1778, Allen drew the seal and Reuben Dean, a local silversmith, made it. The two men were each paid ten shillings for their work.

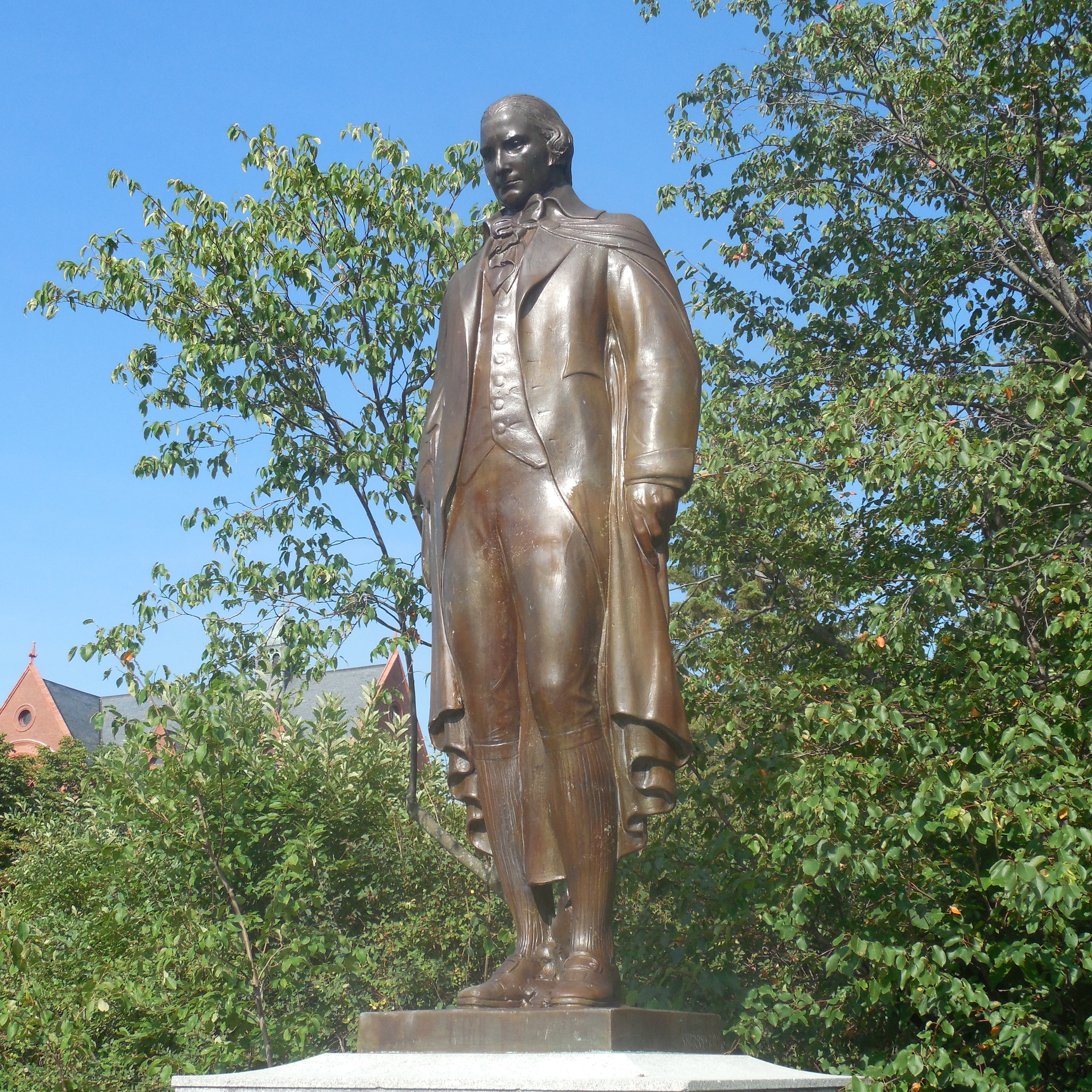
Monument of Ira Allen on the University of Vermont campus in Burlington

In 1780, Allen presented to the state legislature a memorial for the establishment of the University of Vermont. He contributed money and a fifty-acre (20 ha) site at Burlington. He was called the "Father of the University of Vermont” and after his death he has been referred to as the "Metternich of Vermont" (though his actions predate those of Metternich himself). Ira Allen pledged 4,000 British pounds sterling to the University of Vermont, but never donated the money. In response, the Trustees of the University of Vermont secured a writ of attachment on his title to the town of Plainfield to try to extract payment of his original 4,000-pound pledge.

Allen was Vermont's first Treasurer and held office from 1778 to 1786, when he was succeeded by Samuel Mattocks. He married Jerusha Enos (daughter of Roger Enos and Jerusha Hayden) in 1789. Members of the Allen and Enos families were the original proprietors of Irasburg, Vermont, which was named after Ira Allen. Allen subsequently acquired all the proprietary rights to Irasburg and deeded the town to Jerusha Enos as a wedding gift.

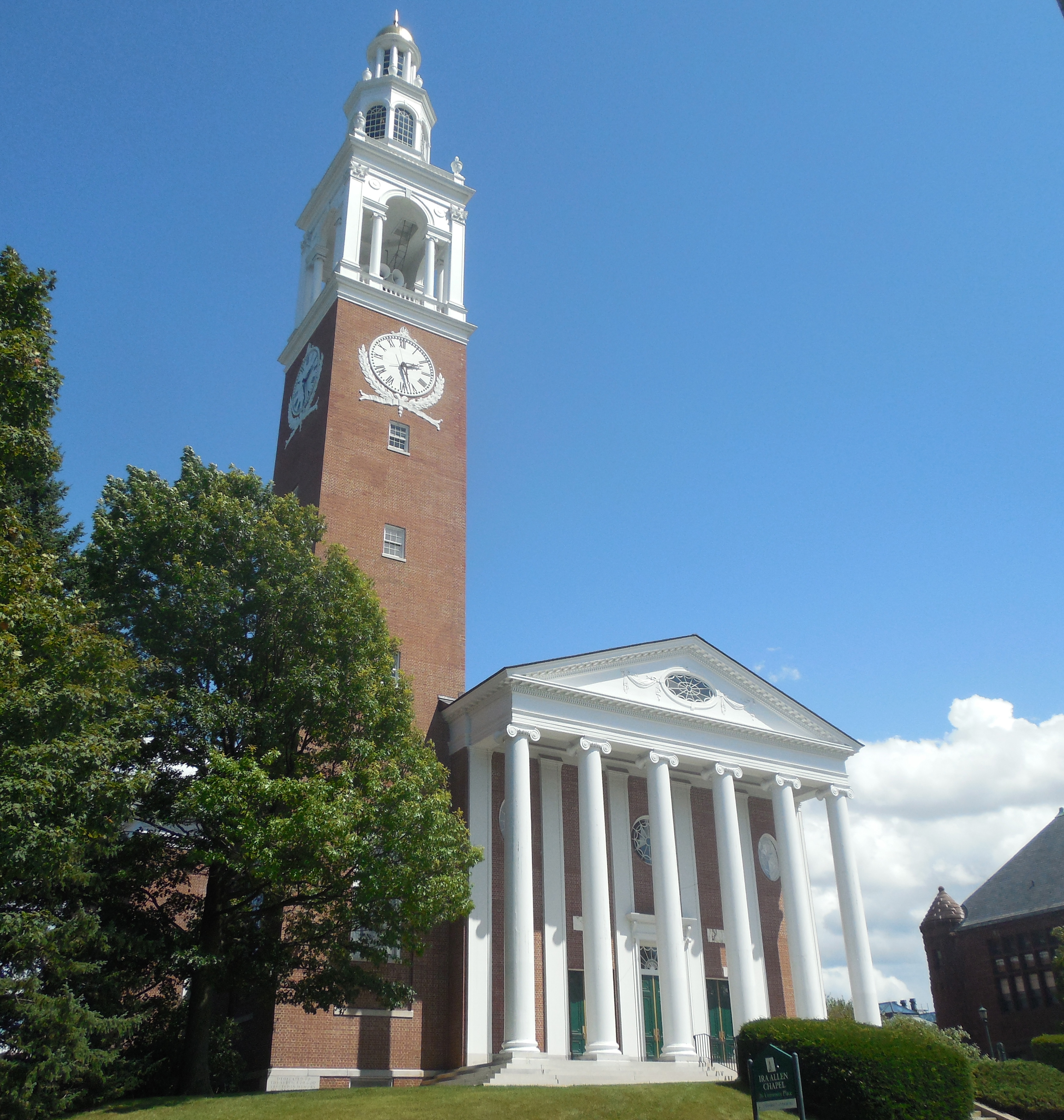
Ira Allen Chapel at the University of Vermont

On October 25, 1790, Ira Allen was commissioned Major General of the Third Division of the Vermont State Militia by Governor Thomas Chittenden. He went to France in 1795 and sought French army intervention for seizing Canada in order to create an independent republic called United Columbia. He bought 20,000 muskets and 24 cannons but was captured at sea, taken to England, placed on trial, and charged with furnishing arms for Irish rebels. He was acquitted after a lawsuit which lasted eight years, and which saw a first of an Admiralty judge being summoned before King's Bench.

Allen died in 1814 in Philadelphia, where he had gone to escape imprisonment for debt, caused by his long absence from Vermont. He was originally buried in Philadelphia's Arch Street Presbyterian Cemetery, but his remains were lost when that cemetery was destroyed. There is a cenotaph in his memory at Greenmount Cemetery in Burlington, Vermont, and a memorial cenotaph at Wetherill’s (Free Quaker) Cemetery in Audubon, Pennsylvania. The Ira Allen Chapel on the University of Vermont's main campus was also named after him.

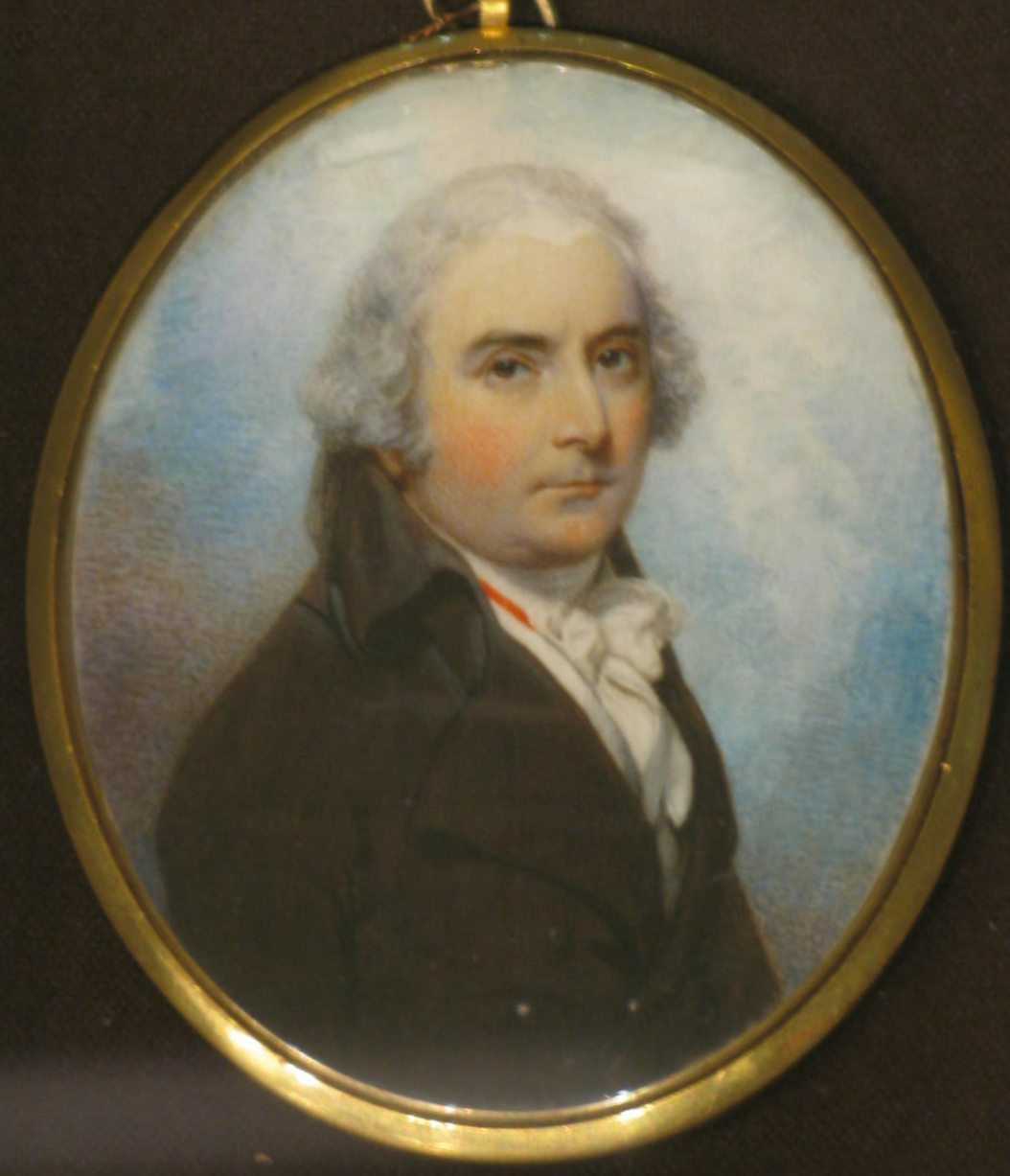
Ira Allen miniature

== Vermont Sesquicentennial half dollar ==
The obverse of the 1927 Vermont Sesquicentennial half dollar, designed by Charles Keck, depicts Allen above the words "Founder of Vermont".

== Works ==
Allen published several books, including:

- The Natural and Political History of Vermont. London: J.W. Myers. 1969 [1798]. ISBN 0-8048-0419-2.
- Statements Appended to the Olive Branch (1807)
