= Political party strength in Vermont =

Politics in the US state of Vermont

The following table indicates party affiliation in the State of Vermont:

- Governor
- Lieutenant Governor
- Secretary of State
- Attorney General
- State Treasurer
- State Auditor of Accounts

It also indicates historical composition:

- Senate
- House of Representatives
- State delegation to the United States Senate
- State delegation to the United States House of Representatives

== 1778–1883 ==
| Year | Executive offices | | | | State Legislature | | United States Congress | | | Electoral votes |
| Year | Governor | Lieutenant Governor | Attorney General | Treasurer | State Senate | State House | U.S. Senator (Class I) | U.S. Senator (Class III) | U.S. House | Electoral votes |
|---|---|---|---|---|---|---|---|---|---|---|
| 1778 | Thomas Chittenden (I) (Note: Held office in the Vermont Republic.) | Joseph Marsh (I) | no such office | Ira Allen (I) | | | no representation in Congress | | | no electoral votes |
| 1779 | Thomas Chittenden (I) | Benjamin Carpenter (I) | no such office | Ira Allen (I) | | | no representation in Congress | | | no electoral votes |
| 1780 | Thomas Chittenden (I) | Benjamin Carpenter (I) | no such office | Ira Allen (I) | | | no representation in Congress | | | no electoral votes |
| 1781 | Thomas Chittenden (I) | Elisha Payne (I) | no such office | Ira Allen (I) | | | no representation in Congress | | | no electoral votes |
| 1782 | Thomas Chittenden (I) | Paul Spooner (I) | no such office | Ira Allen (I) | | | no representation in Congress | | | no electoral votes |
| ... | Thomas Chittenden (I) | Paul Spooner (I) | no such office | Ira Allen (I) | | | no representation in Congress | | | no electoral votes |
| 1785 | Thomas Chittenden (I) | Paul Spooner (I) | no such office | Ira Allen (I) | | | no representation in Congress | | | no electoral votes |
| 1786 | Thomas Chittenden (I) | Paul Spooner (I) | no such office | Samuel Mattocks (I) | | | no representation in Congress | | | no electoral votes |
| 1787 | Thomas Chittenden (I) | Joseph Marsh (I) | no such office | Samuel Mattocks (I) | | | no representation in Congress | | | no electoral votes |
| 1788 | Thomas Chittenden (I) | Joseph Marsh (I) | no such office | Samuel Mattocks (I) | | | no representation in Congress | | | no electoral votes |
| 1789 | Moses Robinson (I) | Joseph Marsh (I) | no such office | Samuel Mattocks (I) | | | no representation in Congress | | | no electoral votes |
| 1790 | Thomas Chittenden (I) | Peter Olcott (I) | Samuel; Hitchcock (F) | Samuel Mattocks (I) | | | no representation in Congress | | | no electoral votes |
| 1791 | Thomas Chittenden (I) | Peter Olcott (I) | Samuel; Hitchcock (F) | Samuel Mattocks (I) | DR majority | | Moses Robinson (AA) | Stephen R. Bradley (AA) | 2AA | no electoral votes |
| 1792 | Thomas Chittenden (I) | Peter Olcott (I) | Samuel; Hitchcock (F) | Samuel Mattocks (I) | DR majority | | Moses Robinson (AA) | Stephen R. Bradley (AA) | 2AA | Washington/ Adams (I) ✓ |
| 1793 | Thomas Chittenden (I) | Peter Olcott (I) | Daniel; Buck (F) | Samuel Mattocks (I) | DR majority | | Moses Robinson (AA) | Stephen R. Bradley (AA) | 2AA | Washington/ Adams (I) ✓ |
| 1794 | Thomas Chittenden (I) | Jonathan Hunt (F) | Daniel; Buck (F) | Samuel Mattocks (I) | F majority | | Moses Robinson (AA) | Stephen R. Bradley (AA) | 2AA | Washington/ Adams (I) ✓ |
| 1795 | Thomas Chittenden (I) | Jonathan Hunt (F) | vacant | Samuel Mattocks (I) | F majority | | Moses Robinson (DR) | Elijah Paine (F) | 1DR, 1F | Washington/ Adams (I) ✓ |
| 1796 | Thomas Chittenden (I) | Paul Brigham (DR) | vacant | Samuel Mattocks (I) | F majority | | Moses Robinson (DR) | Elijah Paine (F) | 1DR, 1F | John Adams/ T. Pinckney (F) ✓ |
| 1797 | Paul Brigham (DR) | vacant | no such office | Samuel Mattocks (I) | F majority | | Isaac Tichenor (F) | Elijah Paine (F) | 1DR, 1F | John Adams/ T. Pinckney (F) ✓ |
| 1797 | Isaac Tichenor (F) | Paul Brigham (DR) | no such office | Samuel Mattocks (I) | F majority | | Nathaniel Chipman (F) | Elijah Paine (F) | 1DR, 1F | John Adams/ T. Pinckney (F) ✓ |
| 1798 | Isaac Tichenor (F) | Paul Brigham (DR) | no such office | Samuel Mattocks (I) | F majority | | Nathaniel Chipman (F) | Elijah Paine (F) | 1DR, 1F | John Adams/ T. Pinckney (F) ✓ |
| 1799 | Isaac Tichenor (F) | Paul Brigham (DR) | no such office | Samuel Mattocks (I) | 130F, 34DR | | Nathaniel Chipman (F) | Elijah Paine (F) | 1DR, 1F | John Adams/ T. Pinckney (F) ✓ |
| 1800 | Isaac Tichenor (F) | Paul Brigham (DR) | no such office | Benjamin Swan (I) | 112F, 52DR | | Nathaniel Chipman (F) | Elijah Paine (F) | 1DR, 1F | John Adams/ C. C. Pinckney (F) ✗ |
| 1801 | Isaac Tichenor (F) | Paul Brigham (DR) | no such office | Benjamin Swan (I) | 99F, 75DR | | Nathaniel Chipman (F) | Elijah Paine (F) | 1DR, 1F | John Adams/ C. C. Pinckney (F) ✗ |
| 1802 | Isaac Tichenor (F) | Paul Brigham (DR) | no such office | Benjamin Swan (I) | 96DR, 82F | | Nathaniel Chipman (F) | Stephen R. Bradley (DR) | 1DR, 1F | John Adams/ C. C. Pinckney (F) ✗ |
| 1803 | Isaac Tichenor (F) | Paul Brigham (DR) | no such office | Benjamin Swan (I) | 102DR, 81F | | Israel Smith (DR) | Stephen R. Bradley (DR) | 3F, 1DR | John Adams/ C. C. Pinckney (F) ✗ |
| 1804 | Isaac Tichenor (F) | Paul Brigham (DR) | no such office | Benjamin Swan (I) | DR majority | | Israel Smith (DR) | Stephen R. Bradley (DR) | 3F, 1DR | Jefferson/ Clinton (DR) ✓ |
| 1805 | Isaac Tichenor (F) | Paul Brigham (DR) | no such office | Benjamin Swan (I) | DR majority | | Israel Smith (DR) | Stephen R. Bradley (DR) | 2DR, 2F | Jefferson/ Clinton (DR) ✓ |
| 1806 | Isaac Tichenor (F) | Paul Brigham (DR) | no such office | Benjamin Swan (I) | 111DR, 80F | | Israel Smith (DR) | Stephen R. Bradley (DR) | 2DR, 2F | Jefferson/ Clinton (DR) ✓ |
| 1807 | Israel Smith (DR) | Paul Brigham (DR) | no such office | Benjamin Swan (I) | DR majority | | Israel Smith (DR) | Stephen R. Bradley (DR) | 2DR, 2F | Jefferson/ Clinton (DR) ✓ |
| 1808 | Isaac Tichenor (F) | Paul Brigham (DR) | no such office | Benjamin Swan (I) | DR majority | | Jonathan Robinson (DR) | Stephen R. Bradley (DR) | 2DR, 2F | Madison/ Clinton (DR) ✓ |
| 1809 | Jonas Galusha (DR) | Paul Brigham (DR) | no such office | Benjamin Swan (I) | 108DR, 91F | | Jonathan Robinson (DR) | Stephen R. Bradley (DR) | 3F, 1DR | Madison/ Clinton (DR) ✓ |
| 1810 | Jonas Galusha (DR) | Paul Brigham (DR) | no such office | Benjamin Swan (I) | 122DR, 78F | | Jonathan Robinson (DR) | Stephen R. Bradley (DR) | 3F, 1DR | Madison/ Clinton (DR) ✓ |
| 1811 | Jonas Galusha (DR) | Paul Brigham (DR) | no such office | Benjamin Swan (I) | 125DR, 65F | | Jonathan Robinson (DR) | Stephen R. Bradley (DR) | 3DR, 1F | Madison/ Clinton (DR) ✓ |
| 1812 | Jonas Galusha (DR) | Paul Brigham (DR) | no such office | Benjamin Swan (I) | 129DR, 77F | | Jonathan Robinson (DR) | Stephen R. Bradley (DR) | 3DR, 1F | Madison/ Gerry (DR) ✓ |
| 1813 | Martin Chittenden (F) | William Chamberlin (F) | no such office | Benjamin Swan (I) | 124DR, 85F | | Jonathan Robinson (DR) | Dudley Chase (DR) | 6DR | Madison/ Gerry (DR) ✓ |
| 1814 | Martin Chittenden (F) | William Chamberlin (F) | no such office | Benjamin Swan (I) | 108F, 104DR | | Jonathan Robinson (DR) | Dudley Chase (DR) | 6DR | Madison/ Gerry (DR) ✓ |
| 1815 | Jonas Galusha (DR) | Paul Brigham (DR) | no such office | Benjamin Swan (I) | 117F, 94DR | | Isaac Tichenor (F) | Dudley Chase (DR) | 6F | Madison/ Gerry (DR) ✓ |
| 1816 | Jonas Galusha (DR) | Paul Brigham (DR) | no such office | Benjamin Swan (I) | 114DR, 101F | | Isaac Tichenor (F) | Dudley Chase (DR) | 6F | Monroe/ Tompkins (DR) ✓ |
| 1817 | Jonas Galusha (DR) | Paul Brigham (DR) | no such office | Benjamin Swan (I) | 119DR, 93F | | Isaac Tichenor (F) | Dudley Chase (DR) | 6DR | Monroe/ Tompkins (DR) ✓ |
| 1818 | Jonas Galusha (DR) | Paul Brigham (DR) | no such office | Benjamin Swan (I) | 148DR, 67F | | Isaac Tichenor (F) | James Fisk (DR) | 6DR | Monroe/ Tompkins (DR) ✓ |
| 1819 | Jonas Galusha (DR) | Paul Brigham (DR) | no such office | Benjamin Swan (I) | DR majority | | Isaac Tichenor (F) | William A. Palmer (DR) | 6DR | Monroe/ Tompkins (DR) ✓ |
| 1820 | Richard Skinner (DR) | William Cahoon (DR) | no such office | Benjamin Swan (I) | DR majority | | Isaac Tichenor (F) | William A. Palmer (DR) | 6DR | Monroe/ Tompkins (DR) ✓ |
| 1821 | Richard Skinner (DR) | William Cahoon (DR) | no such office | Benjamin Swan (I) | DR (A-C) majority | | Horatio Seymour (DR) | William A. Palmer (DR) | 6DR | Monroe/ Tompkins (DR) ✓ |
| 1822 | Richard Skinner (DR) | Aaron Leland (DR) | no such office | Benjamin Swan (I) | DR (A-C) majority | | Horatio Seymour (DR) | William A. Palmer (DR) | 6DR | Monroe/ Tompkins (DR) ✓ |
| 1823 | Cornelius P. Van Ness (DR) | Aaron Leland (DR) | no such office | Benjamin Swan (I) | DR (A-C) majority | | Horatio Seymour (DR) | William A. Palmer (DR) | 5DR | Monroe/ Tompkins (DR) ✓ |
| 1824 | Cornelius P. Van Ness (DR) | Aaron Leland (DR) | no such office | Benjamin Swan (I) | DR (A-C) majority | | Horatio Seymour (DR) | William A. Palmer (DR) | 5DR | Adams/ Calhoun (DR) ✓ |
| 1825 | Cornelius P. Van Ness (DR) | Aaron Leland (DR) | no such office | Benjamin Swan (I) | NR majority | | Horatio Seymour (NR) | Dudley Chase (NR) | 4NR, 1J | Adams/ Calhoun (DR) ✓ |
| 1826 | Ezra Butler (NR) | Aaron Leland (DR) | no such office | Benjamin Swan (I) | NR majority | | Horatio Seymour (NR) | Dudley Chase (NR) | 4NR, 1J | Adams/ Calhoun (DR) ✓ |
| 1827 | Ezra Butler (NR) | Henry Olin (DR) | no such office | Benjamin Swan (I) | DR majority | | Horatio Seymour (NR) | Dudley Chase (NR) | 5NR | Adams/ Calhoun (DR) ✓ |
| 1828 | Samuel C. Crafts (NR) | Henry Olin (DR) | no such office | Benjamin Swan (I) | DR majority | | Horatio Seymour (NR) | Dudley Chase (NR) | 5NR | Adams/ Rush (NR) ✗ |
| 1829 | Samuel C. Crafts (NR) | Henry Olin (DR) | no such office | Benjamin Swan (I) | DR majority | | Horatio Seymour (NR) | Dudley Chase (NR) | 4NR, 1A-M | Adams/ Rush (NR) ✗ |
| 1830 | Samuel C. Crafts (NR) | Mark Richards (NR) | no such office | Benjamin Swan (I) | 136NR, 45J, 33A-M | | Horatio Seymour (NR) | Dudley Chase (NR) | 4NR, 1A-M | Adams/ Rush (NR) ✗ |
| 1831 | William A. Palmer (A-M) | Lebbeus Egerton (A-M) | no such office | Benjamin Swan (I) | 121NR, 76A-M, 28J | | Horatio Seymour (NR) | Samuel Prentiss (NR) | 3NR, 2A-M | Adams/ Rush (NR) ✗ |
| 1832 | William A. Palmer (A-M) | Lebbeus Egerton (A-M) | no such office | Benjamin Swan (I) | 83A-M, 79NR, 33J (Note: The Anti-Masons joined with the Jacksonians and elected John Smith, a Jacksonian, as Speaker, and organized the chamber.) | | Horatio Seymour (NR) | Samuel Prentiss (NR) | 3NR, 2A-M | Wirt/ Ellmaker (A-M) ✗ |
| 1833 | William A. Palmer (A-M) | Lebbeus Egerton (A-M) | no such office | Augustine Clarke (A-M) | 87A-M, 68NR, 40J | | Benjamin Swift (NR) | Samuel Prentiss (NR) | 3NR, 2A-M | Wirt/ Ellmaker (A-M) ✗ |
| 1834 | William A. Palmer (A-M) | Lebbeus Egerton (A-M) | no such office | Augustine Clarke (A-M) | 114A-M, 105J/NR, 5? (Note: The Anti-Masons re-elected John Smith, a Jacksonian, as Speaker, and organized the chamber.) | | Benjamin Swift (NR) | Samuel Prentiss (NR) | 3NR, 2A-M | Wirt/ Ellmaker (A-M) ✗ |
| 1835 | vacant | Silas H. Jennison (A-M) | no such office | Augustine Clarke (A-M) | 87NR, 86A-M, 59J (Note: The Anti-Masons joined with the National Republicans to re-elect Ebenezer N. Briggs, a National Republican, as Speaker, and organized the chamber.) | | Benjamin Swift (NR) | Samuel Prentiss (NR) | 3NR, 2A-M | Wirt/ Ellmaker (A-M) ✗ |
| 1836 | Silas H. Jennison (W) (Note: During his lieutenant governorship, no governor was elected, and Jennison became acting governor. In 1836, he was elected governor.) | David M. Camp (W) | no such office | Augustine Clarke (A-M) | 110A-M, 75J, 35NR | | Benjamin Swift (NR) | Samuel Prentiss (NR) | 3NR, 2A-M | Harrison/ Granger (W) ✗ |
| 1837 | Silas H. Jennison (W) | David M. Camp (W) | no such office | vacant | 18W, 12D | 118W, 100D, 2? | Benjamin Swift (W) | Samuel Prentiss (W) | 3W, 1D, 1A-M | Harrison/ Granger (W) ✗ |
| 1838 | Silas H. Jennison (W) | David M. Camp (W) | no such office | Henry Fisk Janes (W) | 20W, 10D | 128W, 88D, 5? | Benjamin Swift (W) | Samuel Prentiss (W) | 3W, 1D, 1A-M | Harrison/ Granger (W) ✗ |
| 1839 | Silas H. Jennison (W) | David M. Camp (W) | no such office | Henry Fisk Janes (W) | 20W, 10D | 156W, 70D, 3Cons | Samuel S. Phelps (W) | Samuel Prentiss (W) | 2W, 2D, 1A-M | Harrison/ Granger (W) ✗ |
| 1840 | Silas H. Jennison (W) | David M. Camp (W) | no such office | Henry Fisk Janes (W) | 18W, 12D | 118W, 112D | Samuel S. Phelps (W) | Samuel Prentiss (W) | 2W, 2D, 1A-M | Harrison/ Tyler (W) ✓ |
| 1841 | Charles Paine (W) | Waitstill R. Ranney (W) | no such office | John Spaulding (W) | 28W, 2D | 178W, 56D | Samuel S. Phelps (W) | Samuel Prentiss (W) | 4W, 1A-M | Harrison/ Tyler (W) ✓ |
| 1842 | Charles Paine (W) | Waitstill R. Ranney (W) | no such office | John Spaulding (W) | 21W, 9D | 127W, 74D, 4? | Samuel S. Phelps (W) | Samuel C. Crafts (W) | 4W, 1A-M | Harrison/ Tyler (W) ✓ |
| 1843 | John Mattocks (W) | Horace Eaton (W) | no such office | John Spaulding (W) | 16W, 14D | 132W, 99D, 7? | Samuel S. Phelps (W) | William Upham (W) | 3W, 1D | Harrison/ Tyler (W) ✓ |
| 1844 | William Slade (W) | Horace Eaton (W) | no such office | John Spaulding (W) | 21W, 9D | 117W, 93D, 7Lty | Samuel S. Phelps (W) | William Upham (W) | 3W, 1D | Clay/ Frelinghuysen (W) ✗ |
| 1845 | William Slade (W) | Horace Eaton (W) | no such office | John Spaulding (W) | 20W, 10D | 129W, 65D, 8Lty, 3 vac. | Samuel S. Phelps (W) | William Upham (W) | 3W, 1D | Clay/ Frelinghuysen (W) ✗ |
| 1846 | Horace Eaton (W) | Leonard Sargeant (W) | no such office | Elisha P. Jewett (W) | 23W, 7D | 116W, 67D, 12Lty, 40 vac. | Samuel S. Phelps (W) | William Upham (W) | 3W, 1D | Clay/ Frelinghuysen (W) ✗ |
| 1847 | Horace Eaton (W) | Leonard Sargeant (W) | no such office | George Howes (W) | 23W, 7D | 116W, 68D, 10Lty, 39 vac. | Samuel S. Phelps (W) | William Upham (W) | 3W, 1D | Clay/ Frelinghuysen (W) ✗ |
| 1848 | Carlos Coolidge (W) | Robert Pierpoint (W) | no such office | George Howes (W) | 21W, 9D | 104W, 78D, 18Lty, 37 vac. | Samuel S. Phelps (W) | William Upham (W) | 3W, 1D | Taylor/ Fillmore (W) ✓ |
| 1849 | Carlos Coolidge (W) | Robert Pierpoint (W) | no such office | George Howes (W) | 21W, 7D, 2FS | 102W, 65FS, 49D, 20 vac. | Samuel S. Phelps (W) | William Upham (W) | 3W, 1D | Taylor/ Fillmore (W) ✓ |
| 1850 | Charles K. Williams (W) | Julius Converse (W) | no such office | George Howes (W) | 22W, 7FS, 1D | 120W, 84FS, 10D, 22 vac. | Samuel S. Phelps (W) | William Upham (W) | 3W, 1D | Taylor/ Fillmore (W) ✓ |
| 1851 | Charles K. Williams (W) | Julius Converse (W) | no such office | George Howes (W) | 20W, 7FS, 3D | 132W, 72FS, 19D, 17 vac. | Solomon Foot (W) | William Upham (W) | 3W, 1D | Taylor/ Fillmore (W) ✓ |
| 1852 | Erastus Fairbanks (W) | William C. Kittredge (W) | no such office | George Howes (W) | 21W, 8FS, 1D | 112W, 69FS, 30D, 29 vac. | Solomon Foot (W) | William Upham (W) | 3W, 1D | Scott/ Graham (W) ✗ |
| 1853 | John S. Robinson (D) | Jefferson P. Kidder (D) | no such office | John A. Page (D) | 20W, 8D, 2FS | 98W, 59D, 34FS, 47 vac. | Solomon Foot (W) | Samuel S. Phelps (W) | 3W | Scott/ Graham (W) ✗ |
| 1854 | Stephen Royce (R) | Ryland Fletcher (R) | no such office | Henry M. Bates (R) | 17W, 11D, 2FS | 95W, 82D, 37FS, 27 vac. (Note: A Free Soil Democrat, Horatio Needham, was elected as Speaker in a coalition between the Democrats and Free Soilers.) | Solomon Foot (W) | Lawrence Brainerd (FS) | 3W | Scott/ Graham (W) ✗ |
| 1855 | Stephen Royce (R) | Ryland Fletcher (R) | no such office | Henry M. Bates (R) | 29W, 1D | 133W, 46D, 31FS, 20 vac. | Solomon Foot (R) | Jacob Collamer (R) | 1R, 1W, 1O | Scott/ Graham (W) ✗ |
| 1856 | Ryland Fletcher (R) | James M. Slade (R) | no such office | Henry M. Bates (R) | 29R, 1D | 157R, 30A, 28D, 12 vac. | Solomon Foot (R) | Jacob Collamer (R) | 1R, 1W, 1O | Frémont/ Dayton (R) ✗ |
| 1857 | Ryland Fletcher (R) | James M. Slade (R) | no such office | Henry M. Bates (R) | 30R | 227R, 8D, 4 vac. | Solomon Foot (R) | Jacob Collamer (R) | 3R | Frémont/ Dayton (R) ✗ |
| 1858 | Hiland Hall (R) | Burnham Martin (R) | no such office | Henry M. Bates (R) | 30R | 200R, 30D, 2?, 7 vac. | Solomon Foot (R) | Jacob Collamer (R) | 3R | Frémont/ Dayton (R) ✗ |
| 1859 | Hiland Hall (R) | Burnham Martin (R) | no such office | Henry M. Bates (R) | 29R, 1D | 190R, 38D, 1Abol, 1W, 9 vac. | Solomon Foot (R) | Jacob Collamer (R) | 3R | Frémont/ Dayton (R) ✗ |
| 1860 | Erastus Fairbanks (R) | Levi Underwood (R) | no such office | John B. Page (R) | 30R | 199R, 32D, 3I, 1W, 4 vac. | Solomon Foot (R) | Jacob Collamer (R) | 3R | Lincoln/ Hamlin (R) ✓ |
| 1861 | Frederick Holbrook (R) | Levi Underwood (R) | no such office | John B. Page (R) | 29R, 1D | 210R, 25D, 2I, 3 vac. | Solomon Foot (R) | Jacob Collamer (R) | 3R | Lincoln/ Hamlin (R) ✓ |
| 1862 | Frederick Holbrook (R) | Paul Dillingham (NU) | no such office | John B. Page (R) | 30R | 200R, 17D, 5 vac. | Solomon Foot (R) | Jacob Collamer (R) | 3R | Lincoln/ Hamlin (R) ✓ |
| 1863 | J. Gregory Smith (R) | Paul Dillingham (NU) | no such office | John B. Page (R) | 30R | R majority | Solomon Foot (R) | Jacob Collamer (R) | 3R | Lincoln/ Hamlin (R) ✓ |
| 1864 | J. Gregory Smith (R) | Paul Dillingham (NU) | no such office | John B. Page (R) | 30R | 224R, 14D, 2 vac. | Solomon Foot (R) | Jacob Collamer (R) | 3R | Lincoln/ Johnson (NU) ✓ |
| 1865 | Paul Dillingham (R) | Abraham B. Gardner (R) | no such office | John B. Page (R) | 30R | 212R, 19D, 2 vac. | Solomon Foot (R) | Jacob Collamer (R) | 3R | Lincoln/ Johnson (NU) ✓ |
| 1866 | Paul Dillingham (R) | Abraham B. Gardner (R) | no such office | John A. Page (R) | 30R | 213R, 11D, 4 vac. | George F. Edmunds (R) | Luke P. Poland (R) | 3R | Lincoln/ Johnson (NU) ✓ |
| 1867 | John B. Page (R) | Stephen Thomas (R) | no such office | John A. Page (R) | 30R | 224R, 13D, 3 vac. | George F. Edmunds (R) | Justin S. Morrill (R) | 3R | Lincoln/ Johnson (NU) ✓ |
| 1868 | John B. Page (R) | Stephen Thomas (R) | no such office | John A. Page (R) | 29R, 1Cons | 213R, 25D, 3 vac. | George F. Edmunds (R) | Justin S. Morrill (R) | 3R | Grant/ Colfax (R) ✓ |
| 1869 | Peter T. Washburn (R) (Note: Died in office.) | George Whitman Hendee (R) | no such office | John A. Page (R) | 30R | 224R, 15D, 2 vac. | George F. Edmunds (R) | Justin S. Morrill (R) | 3R | Grant/ Colfax (R) ✓ |
| 1870 | George Whitman Hendee (R) | vacant | no such office | John A. Page (R) | 30R | 210R, 24D, 1Cons, 1?, 5 vac. | George F. Edmunds (R) | Justin S. Morrill (R) | 3R | Grant/ Colfax (R) ✓ |
| 1870 | John Wolcott Stewart (R) | George N. Dale (R) | no such office | John A. Page (R) | 30R | 210R, 24D, 1Cons, 1?, 5 vac. | George F. Edmunds (R) | Justin S. Morrill (R) | 3R | Grant/ Colfax (R) ✓ |
| 1871 | John Wolcott Stewart (R) | George N. Dale (R) | no such office | John A. Page (R) | 28R, 2D | 208R, 25D, 1Cons, 1?, 6 vac. | George F. Edmunds (R) | Justin S. Morrill (R) | 3R | Grant/ Colfax (R) ✓ |
| 1872 | Julius Converse (R) | Russell S. Taft (R) | no such office | John A. Page (R) | 28R, 2D | 208R, 25D, 1Cons, 1?, 6 vac. | George F. Edmunds (R) | Justin S. Morrill (R) | 3R | Grant/ Wilson (R) ✓ |
| 1873 | Julius Converse (R) | Russell S. Taft (R) | no such office | John A. Page (R) | 30R | 216R, 16D, 7LR, 2 vac. | George F. Edmunds (R) | Justin S. Morrill (R) | 3R | Grant/ Wilson (R) ✓ |
| 1874 | Asahel Peck (R) | Lyman G. Hinckley (R) | no such office | John A. Page (R) | 30R | 216R, 16D, 7LR, 2 vac. | George F. Edmunds (R) | Justin S. Morrill (R) | 3R | Grant/ Wilson (R) ✓ |
| 1875 | Asahel Peck (R) | Lyman G. Hinckley (R) | no such office | John A. Page (R) | 29R, 1D | 174R, 50D, 8LR, 4I, 5 vac. | George F. Edmunds (R) | Justin S. Morrill (R) | 3R | Grant/ Wilson (R) ✓ |
| 1876 | Horace Fairbanks (R) | Redfield Proctor (R) | no such office | John A. Page (R) | 29R, 1D | 174R, 50D, 8LR, 4I, 5 vac. | George F. Edmunds (R) | Justin S. Morrill (R) | 3R | Hayes/ Wheeler (R) ✓ |
| 1877 | Horace Fairbanks (R) | Redfield Proctor (R) | no such office | John A. Page (R) | 30R | 205R, 31D, 5 vac. | George F. Edmunds (R) | Justin S. Morrill (R) | 3R | Hayes/ Wheeler (R) ✓ |
| 1878 | Redfield Proctor (R) | Eben Pomeroy Colton (R) | no such office | John A. Page (R) | 30R | 205R, 31D, 5 vac. | George F. Edmunds (R) | Justin S. Morrill (R) | 3R | Hayes/ Wheeler (R) ✓ |
| 1879 | Redfield Proctor (R) | Eben Pomeroy Colton (R) | no such office | John A. Page (R) | 29R, 1D | 175R, 45D, 6GB, 5I, 10 vac. | George F. Edmunds (R) | Justin S. Morrill (R) | 2R, 1GB | Hayes/ Wheeler (R) ✓ |
| 1880 | Roswell Farnham (R) | John L. Barstow (R) | no such office | John A. Page (R) | 29R, 1D | 175R, 45D, 6GB, 5I, 10 vac. | George F. Edmunds (R) | Justin S. Morrill (R) | 2R, 1GB | Garfield/ Arthur (R) ✓ |
| 1881 | Roswell Farnham (R) | John L. Barstow (R) | no such office | John A. Page (R) | 30R | 217R, 19D, 1GB, 1I, 3 vac. | George F. Edmunds (R) | Justin S. Morrill (R) | 3R | Garfield/ Arthur (R) ✓ |
| 1882 | John L. Barstow (R) | Samuel E. Pingree (R) | no such office | William H. Dubois (R) | 30R | 217R, 19D, 1GB, 1I, 3 vac. | George F. Edmunds (R) | Justin S. Morrill (R) | 3R | Garfield/ Arthur (R) ✓ |
| 1883 | John L. Barstow (R) | Samuel E. Pingree (R) | no such office | William H. Dubois (R) | 28R, 2D | 183R, 47D, 4I, (Note: Includes 3 Independent Democrats.) 2GB, 5 vac. | George F. Edmunds (R) | Justin S. Morrill (R) | 2R | Garfield/ Arthur (R) ✓ |

== 1884–present ==
| Year | Executive offices | | | | | | State Legislature | | United States Congress | | | Electoral votes |
| Year | Governor | Lieutenant Governor | Secretary of State | Attorney General | Treasurer | Auditor | State Senate | State House | U.S. Senator (Class I) | U.S. Senator (Class III) | U.S. House | Electoral votes |
|---|---|---|---|---|---|---|---|---|---|---|---|---|
| 1884 | Samuel E. Pingree (R) | Ebenezer J. Ormsbee (R) | George Nichols (R) | no such office | William H. Dubois (R) | E. Henry Powell (R) | 28R, 2D | 183R, 47D, 4I, (Note: Includes 3 Independent Democrats.) 2GB, 5 vac. | George F. Edmunds (R) | Justin S. Morrill (R) | 2R | Blaine/ Logan ✗ |
| 1885 | Samuel E. Pingree (R) | Ebenezer J. Ormsbee (R) | Charles W. Porter (R) | no such office | William H. Dubois (R) | E. Henry Powell (R) | 27R, 3D | 195R, 35D, 4GB, 4I, (Note: Includes 1 Independent Republican.) 1Proh, 2 vac. | George F. Edmunds (R) | Justin S. Morrill (R) | 2R | Blaine/ Logan ✗ |
| 1886 | Ebenezer J. Ormsbee (R) | Levi K. Fuller (R) | Charles W. Porter (R) | no such office | William H. Dubois (R) | E. Henry Powell (R) | 27R, 3D | 195R, 35D, 4GB, 4I, 1Proh, 2 vac. | George F. Edmunds (R) | Justin S. Morrill (R) | 2R | Blaine/ Logan ✗ |
| 1887 | Ebenezer J. Ormsbee (R) | Levi K. Fuller (R) | Charles W. Porter (R) | no such office | William H. Dubois (R) | E. Henry Powell (R) | 29R, 1D | 207R, (Note: Includes 1 Prohibitionist Republican.) 29D, 3I, (Note: Includes 1 Independent Democrat and 1 Independent Republican.) 2 vac. | George F. Edmunds (R) | Justin S. Morrill (R) | 2R | Blaine/ Logan ✗ |
| 1888 | William P. Dillingham (R) | Urban A. Woodbury (R) | Charles W. Porter (R) | no such office | William H. Dubois (R) | E. Henry Powell (R) | 29R, 1D | 207R, 29D, 3I, 2 vac. | George F. Edmunds (R) | Justin S. Morrill (R) | 2R | Harrison/ Morton (R) ✓ |
| 1889 | William P. Dillingham (R) | Urban A. Woodbury (R) | Charles W. Porter (R) | no such office | William H. Dubois (R) | E. Henry Powell (R) | 30R | 219R, 19D, 2I, (Note: Includes 1 Independent Democrat.) 4 vac. | George F. Edmunds (R) | Justin S. Morrill (R) | 2R | Harrison/ Morton (R) ✓ |
| 1890 | Carroll S. Page (R) | Henry A. Fletcher (R) | Chauncey W. Brownell (R) | no such office | Henry F. Field (R) | E. Henry Powell (R) | 30R | 219R, 19D, 2I, 4 vac. | George F. Edmunds (R) | Justin S. Morrill (R) | 2R | Harrison/ Morton (R) ✓ |
| 1891 | Carroll S. Page (R) | Henry A. Fletcher (R) | Chauncey W. Brownell (R) | no such office | Henry F. Field (R) | E. Henry Powell (R) | 29R, 1D | 172R, 62D, 3I, 2Pop, 3 vac. | George F. Edmunds (R) | Justin S. Morrill (R) | 2R | Harrison/ Morton (R) ✓ |
| 1892 | Levi K. Fuller (R) | Farrand Stewart Stranahan (R) | Chauncey W. Brownell (R) | no such office | Henry F. Field (R) | Franklin D. Hale (R) | 29R, 1D | 172R, 62D, 3I, 2Pop, 3 vac. | Redfield Proctor (R) | Justin S. Morrill (R) | 2R | Harrison/ Reid (R) ✗ |
| 1893 | Levi K. Fuller (R) | Farrand Stewart Stranahan (R) | Chauncey W. Brownell (R) | no such office | Henry F. Field (R) | Franklin D. Hale (R) | 30R | 200R, 40D, 1Pop, 2 vac. | Redfield Proctor (R) | Justin S. Morrill (R) | 2R | Harrison/ Reid (R) ✗ |
| 1894 | Urban A. Woodbury (R) | Zophar Mansur (R) | Chauncey W. Brownell (R) | no such office | Henry F. Field (R) | Franklin D. Hale (R) | 30R | 200R, 40D, 1Pop, 2 vac. | Redfield Proctor (R) | Justin S. Morrill (R) | 2R | Harrison/ Reid (R) ✗ |
| 1895 | Urban A. Woodbury (R) | Zophar Mansur (R) | Chauncey W. Brownell (R) | no such office | Henry F. Field (R) | Franklin D. Hale (R) | 30R | 228R, 11D, 1I, 1Pop, 3 vac. | Redfield Proctor (R) | Justin S. Morrill (R) | 2R | Harrison/ Reid (R) ✗ |
| 1896 | Josiah Grout (R) | Nelson W. Fisk (R) | Chauncey W. Brownell (R) | no such office | Henry F. Field (R) | Franklin D. Hale (R) | 30R | 228R, 11D, 1I, 1Pop, 3 vac. | Redfield Proctor (R) | Justin S. Morrill (R) | 2R | McKinley/ Hobart (R) ✓ |
| 1897 | Josiah Grout (R) | Nelson W. Fisk (R) | Chauncey W. Brownell (R) | no such office | Henry F. Field (R) | Franklin D. Hale (R) | 30R | 224R, 19D, 1I, 1Pop, 1 vac. | Redfield Proctor (R) | Justin S. Morrill (R) | 2R | McKinley/ Hobart (R) ✓ |
| 1898 | Edward Curtis Smith (R) | Henry C. Bates (R) | Fred A. Howland (R) | no such office | John L. Bacon (R) | Orion M. Barber (R) | 30R | 224R, 19D, 1I, 1Pop, 1 vac. | Redfield Proctor (R) | Justin S. Morrill (R) | 2R | McKinley/ Hobart (R) ✓ |
| 1899 | Edward Curtis Smith (R) | Henry C. Bates (R) | Fred A. Howland (R) | no such office | John L. Bacon (R) | Orion M. Barber (R) | 30R | 203R, 41D, 1I, 1Proh | Redfield Proctor (R) | Jonathan Ross (R) | 2R | McKinley/ Hobart (R) ✓ |
| 1900 | William W. Stickney (R) | Martin F. Allen (R) | Fred A. Howland (R) | no such office | John L. Bacon (R) | Orion M. Barber (R) | 30R | 203R, 41D, 1I, 1Proh | Redfield Proctor (R) | William P. Dillingham (R) | 2R | McKinley/ Roosevelt (R) ✓ |
| 1901 | William W. Stickney (R) | Martin F. Allen (R) | Fred A. Howland (R) | no such office | John L. Bacon (R) | Orion M. Barber (R) | 30R | 196R, 48D, 1ID, 1 vac. | Redfield Proctor (R) | William P. Dillingham (R) | 2R | McKinley/ Roosevelt (R) ✓ |
| 1902 | John G. McCullough (R) | Zed S. Stanton (R) | Frederick G. Fleetwood (R) | no such office | John L. Bacon (R) | Horace F. Graham (R) | 30R | 196R, 48D, 1ID, 1 vac. | Redfield Proctor (R) | William P. Dillingham (R) | 2R | McKinley/ Roosevelt (R) ✓ |
| 1903 | John G. McCullough (R) | Zed S. Stanton (R) | Frederick G. Fleetwood (R) | no such office | John L. Bacon (R) | Horace F. Graham (R) | 25R, 5D | 192R, 48D, 1ID, 1Lab, 4 vac. | Redfield Proctor (R) | William P. Dillingham (R) | 2R | McKinley/ Roosevelt (R) ✓ |
| 1904 | Charles J. Bell (R) | Charles H. Stearns (R) | Frederick G. Fleetwood (R) | no such office | John L. Bacon (R) | Horace F. Graham (R) | 25R, 5D | 192R, 48D, 1ID, 1Lab, 4 vac. | Redfield Proctor (R) | William P. Dillingham (R) | 2R | Roosevelt/ Fairbanks (R) ✓ |
| 1905 | Charles J. Bell (R) | Charles H. Stearns (R) | Frederick G. Fleetwood (R) | no such office | John L. Bacon (R) | Horace F. Graham (R) | 30R | 206R, 33D, 5I, (Note: Includes 2 Independent Democrats.) 1Cit | Redfield Proctor (R) | William P. Dillingham (R) | 2R | Roosevelt/ Fairbanks (R) ✓ |
| 1906 | Fletcher D. Proctor (R) | George H. Prouty (R) | Frederick G. Fleetwood (R) | Clarke C. Fitts (R) | Edward H. Deavitt (R) | Horace F. Graham (R) | 30R | 206R, 33D, 5I, 1Cit | Redfield Proctor (R) | William P. Dillingham (R) | 2R | Roosevelt/ Fairbanks (R) ✓ |
| 1907 | Fletcher D. Proctor (R) | George H. Prouty (R) | Frederick G. Fleetwood (R) | Clarke C. Fitts (R) | Edward H. Deavitt (R) | Horace F. Graham (R) | 30R | 199R, 35D, 7I, 2Fus, 1Pop, 1Proh, 1 vac. | Redfield Proctor (R) | William P. Dillingham (R) | 2R | Roosevelt/ Fairbanks (R) ✓ |
| 1908 | George H. Prouty (R) | John A. Mead (R) | Guy W. Bailey (R) | John G. Sargent (R) | Edward H. Deavitt (R) | Horace F. Graham (R) | 30R | 199R, 35D, 7I, 2Fus, 1Pop, 1Proh, 1 vac. | John Wolcott Stewart (R) | William P. Dillingham (R) | 2R | Taft/ Sherman (R) ✓ |
| 1909 | George H. Prouty (R) | John A. Mead (R) | Guy W. Bailey (R) | John G. Sargent (R) | Edward H. Deavitt (R) | Horace F. Graham (R) | 28R, 2D | 201R, 29D, 6I, (Note: Includes 3 Independent Republicans.) 2 vac. | Carroll S. Page (R) | William P. Dillingham (R) | 2R | Taft/ Sherman (R) ✓ |
| 1910 | John A. Mead (R) | Leighton P. Slack (R) | Guy W. Bailey (R) | John G. Sargent (R) | Edward H. Deavitt (R) | Horace F. Graham (R) | 28R, 2D | 201R, 29D, 6I, 2 vac. | Carroll S. Page (R) | William P. Dillingham (R) | 2R | Taft/ Sherman (R) ✓ |
| 1911 | John A. Mead (R) | Leighton P. Slack (R) | Guy W. Bailey (R) | John G. Sargent (R) | Edward H. Deavitt (R) | Horace F. Graham (R) | 30R | 194R, 47D, 4I, 1Roos | Carroll S. Page (R) | William P. Dillingham (R) | 2R | Taft/ Sherman (R) ✓ |
| 1912 | Allen M. Fletcher (R) | Frank E. Howe (R) | Guy W. Bailey (R) | Rufus E. Brown (R) | Edward H. Deavitt (R) | Horace F. Graham (R) | 30R | 194R, 47D, 4I, 1Roos | Carroll S. Page (R) | William P. Dillingham (R) | 2R | Taft/ Butler (R) ✗ |
| 1913 | Allen M. Fletcher (R) | Frank E. Howe (R) | Guy W. Bailey (R) | Rufus E. Brown (R) | Edward H. Deavitt (R) | Horace F. Graham (R) | 27R, 3D | 147R, 56D, 30Prog, (Note: Includes 7 Progressive Republicans, 2 Independent Progressives, and 1 Progressive Democrat.) 8I, (Note: Includes 3 Independent Republicans, 2 Independent Progressives and 1 Independent Democrat.) 1Lab, 1Proh, 3 vac. | Carroll S. Page (R) | William P. Dillingham (R) | 2R | Taft/ Butler (R) ✗ |
| 1914 | Allen M. Fletcher (R) | Frank E. Howe (R) | Guy W. Bailey (R) | Rufus E. Brown (R) | Edward H. Deavitt (R) | Horace F. Graham (R) | 27R, 3D | 147R, 56D, 30Prog, 8I, 1Lab, 1Proh, 3 vac. | Carroll S. Page (R) | William P. Dillingham (R) | 2R | Taft/ Butler (R) ✗ |
| 1915 | Charles W. Gates (R) | Hale K. Darling (R) | Guy W. Bailey (R) | Herbert G. Barber (R) | Walter F. Scott (R) | Horace F. Graham (R) | 30R | 177R, (Note: Includes 2 Labor Republicans.) 32D, 28Prog, (Note: Includes 4 Progressive Republicans.) 9I (Note: Includes 2 Independent Democrats, 2 Independent Republicans, and 1 Independent Progressive.) | Carroll S. Page (R) | William P. Dillingham (R) | 2R | Taft/ Butler (R) ✗ |
| 1916 | Charles W. Gates (R) | Hale K. Darling (R) | Guy W. Bailey (R) | Herbert G. Barber (R) | Walter F. Scott (R) | Horace F. Graham (R) | 30R | 177R, 32D, 28Prog, 9I | Carroll S. Page (R) | William P. Dillingham (R) | 2R | Hughes/ Fairbanks (R) ✗ |
| 1917 | Horace F. Graham (R) | Roger W. Hulburd (R) | Frederick G. Fleetwood (R) | Herbert G. Barber (R) | Walter F. Scott (R) | Benjamin Gates (R) | 30R | 195R, 42D, 6I, 1S, 1 vac. | Carroll S. Page (R) | William P. Dillingham (R) | 2R | Hughes/ Fairbanks (R) ✗ |
| 1918 | Horace F. Graham (R) | Roger W. Hulburd (R) | Frederick G. Fleetwood (R) | Herbert G. Barber (R) | Walter F. Scott (R) | Benjamin Gates (R) | 30R | 195R, 42D, 6I, 1S, 1 vac. | Carroll S. Page (R) | William P. Dillingham (R) | 2R | Hughes/ Fairbanks (R) ✗ |
| 1919 | Percival W. Clement (R) | Mason S. Stone (R) | Harry A. Black (R) | Frank C. Archibald (R) | Walter F. Scott (R) | Benjamin Gates (R) | 29R, 1D | 212R, 25D, 9I, (Note: Includes 4 Independent Republicans.) 1 vac. | Carroll S. Page (R) | William P. Dillingham (R) | 2R | Hughes/ Fairbanks (R) ✗ |
| 1920 | Percival W. Clement (R) | Mason S. Stone (R) | Harry A. Black (R) | Frank C. Archibald (R) | Walter F. Scott (R) | Benjamin Gates (R) | 29R, 1D | 212R, 25D, 9I, 1 vac. | Carroll S. Page (R) | William P. Dillingham (R) | 2R | Harding/ Coolidge (R) ✓ |
| 1921 | James Hartness (R) | Abram W. Foote (R) | Harry A. Black (R) | Frank C. Archibald (R) | Walter F. Scott (R) | Benjamin Gates (R) | 29R, 1D | 216R, 22D, 8I, (Note: Includes 2 Independent Republicans and 1 Independent Democrat.) | Carroll S. Page (R) | William P. Dillingham (R) | 2R | Harding/ Coolidge (R) ✓ |
| 1922 | James Hartness (R) | Abram W. Foote (R) | Harry A. Black (R) | Frank C. Archibald (R) | Walter F. Scott (R) | Benjamin Gates (R) | 29R, 1D | 216R, 22D, 8I, | Carroll S. Page (R) | William P. Dillingham (R) | 2R | Harding/ Coolidge (R) ✓ |
| 1923 | Redfield Proctor Jr. (R) | Franklin S. Billings (R) | Harry A. Black (R) | Frank C. Archibald (R) | Thomas H. Cave (R) | Benjamin Gates (R) | 30R | 203R, 37D, 7I, 1 vac. | Frank L. Greene (R) | Porter H. Dale (R) | 2R | Harding/ Coolidge (R) ✓ |
| 1924 | Redfield Proctor Jr. (R) | Franklin S. Billings (R) | Harry A. Black (R) | Frank C. Archibald (R) | Thomas H. Cave (R) | Benjamin Gates (R) | 30R | 203R, 37D, 7I, 1 vac. | Frank L. Greene (R) | Porter H. Dale (R) | 2R | Coolidge/ Dawes (R) ✓ |
| 1925 | Franklin S. Billings (R) | Walter K. Farnsworth (R) | Aaron H. Grout (R) | Frank C. Archibald (R) | Thomas H. Cave (R) | Benjamin Gates (R) | 30R | 214R, 29D, 5I | Frank L. Greene (R) | Porter H. Dale (R) | 2R | Coolidge/ Dawes (R) ✓ |
| 1926 | Franklin S. Billings (R) | Walter K. Farnsworth (R) | Aaron H. Grout (R) | J. Ward Carver (R) (Note: Appointed to fill vacancy.) | Thomas H. Cave (R) | Benjamin Gates (R) | 30R | 214R, 29D, 5I | Frank L. Greene (R) | Porter H. Dale (R) | 2R | Coolidge/ Dawes (R) ✓ |
| 1927 | John E. Weeks (R) | Hollister Jackson (R) | Rawson C. Myrick (R) | J. Ward Carver (R) | Thomas H. Cave (R) | Benjamin Gates (R) | 30R | 217R, 29D, 2I | Frank L. Greene (R) | Porter H. Dale (R) | 2R | Coolidge/ Dawes (R) ✓ |
| 1928 | John E. Weeks (R) | Hollister Jackson (R) | Rawson C. Myrick (R) | J. Ward Carver (R) | Thomas H. Cave (R) | Benjamin Gates (R) | 30R | 217R, 29D, 2I | Frank L. Greene (R) | Porter H. Dale (R) | 2R | Hoover/ Curtis (R) ✓ |
| 1929 | John E. Weeks (R) | Stanley C. Wilson (R) | Rawson C. Myrick (R) | J. Ward Carver (R) | Thomas H. Cave (R) | Benjamin Gates (R) | 29R, 1D | 224R, 19D, 5I | Frank L. Greene (R) | Porter H. Dale (R) | 2R | Hoover/ Curtis (R) ✓ |
| 1930 | John E. Weeks (R) | Stanley C. Wilson (R) | Rawson C. Myrick (R) | J. Ward Carver (R) | Thomas H. Cave (R) | Benjamin Gates (R) | 29R, 1D | 224R, 19D, 5I | Frank L. Greene (R) | Porter H. Dale (R) | 2R | Hoover/ Curtis (R) ✓ |
| 1931 | Stanley C. Wilson (R) | Benjamin Williams (R) | Rawson C. Myrick (R) | Lawrence C. Jones (R) | Thomas H. Cave (R) | Benjamin Gates (R) | 27R, 3D | 210R, 34D, 4I | Frank C. Partridge (R) | Porter H. Dale (R) | 2R | Hoover/ Curtis (R) ✓ |
| 1931 | Stanley C. Wilson (R) | Benjamin Williams (R) | Rawson C. Myrick (R) | Lawrence C. Jones (R) | Thomas H. Cave (R) | Benjamin Gates (R) | 27R, 3D | 210R, 34D, 4I | Warren Austin (R) | Porter H. Dale (R) | 2R | Hoover/ Curtis (R) ✓ |
| 1932 | Stanley C. Wilson (R) | Benjamin Williams (R) | Rawson C. Myrick (R) | Lawrence C. Jones (R) | Thomas H. Cave (R) | Benjamin Gates (R) | 27R, 3D | 210R, 34D, 4I | Warren Austin (R) | Porter H. Dale (R) | 2R | Hoover/ Curtis (R) ✓ |
| 1933 | Stanley C. Wilson (R) | Charles Manley Smith (R) | Rawson C. Myrick (R) | Lawrence C. Jones (R) | Thomas H. Cave (R) | Benjamin Gates (R) | 26R, 4D | 200R, 38D, 10I (Note: Includes 2 Independent Republicans.) | Warren Austin (R) | Porter H. Dale (R) | Ernest W. Gibson (R) | Hoover/ Curtis (R) ✓ |
| 1934 | Stanley C. Wilson (R) | Charles Manley Smith (R) | Rawson C. Myrick (R) | Lawrence C. Jones (R) | Thomas H. Cave (R) | Benjamin Gates (R) | 26R, 4D | 200R, 38D, 10I | Warren Austin (R) | Ernest W. Gibson (R) | Charles A. Plumley (R) | Hoover/ Curtis (R) ✓ |
| 1935 | Charles Manley Smith (R) | George Aiken (R) | Rawson C. Myrick (R) | Lawrence C. Jones (R) | Thomas H. Cave (R) | Benjamin Gates (R) | 23R, 7D | 193R, 48D, 9I | Warren Austin (R) | Ernest W. Gibson (R) | Charles A. Plumley (R) | Hoover/ Curtis (R) ✓ |
| 1936 | Charles Manley Smith (R) | George Aiken (R) | Rawson C. Myrick (R) | Lawrence C. Jones (R) | Thomas H. Cave (R) | Benjamin Gates (R) | 23R, 7D | 193R, 48D, 9I | Warren Austin (R) | Ernest W. Gibson (R) | Charles A. Plumley (R) | Landon/ Knox (R) ✗ |
| 1937 | George Aiken (R) | William Henry Wills (R) | Rawson C. Myrick (R) | Lawrence C. Jones (R) | Thomas H. Cave (R) | Benjamin Gates (R) | 22R, 8D | 203R, 39D, 6I | Warren Austin (R) | Ernest W. Gibson (R) | Charles A. Plumley (R) | Landon/ Knox (R) ✗ |
| 1938 | George Aiken (R) | William Henry Wills (R) | Rawson C. Myrick (R) | Lawrence C. Jones (R) | Thomas H. Cave (R) | Benjamin Gates (R) | 22R, 8D | 203R, 39D, 6I | Warren Austin (R) | Ernest W. Gibson (R) | Charles A. Plumley (R) | Landon/ Knox (R) ✗ |
| 1939 | George Aiken (R) | William Henry Wills (R) | Rawson C. Myrick (R) | Lawrence C. Jones (R) | Thomas H. Cave (R) | Benjamin Gates (R) | 25R, 5D | 204R, 31D, 11I | Warren Austin (R) | Ernest W. Gibson (R) | Charles A. Plumley (R) | Landon/ Knox (R) ✗ |
| 1940 | George Aiken (R) | William Henry Wills (R) | Rawson C. Myrick (R) | Lawrence C. Jones (R) | Thomas H. Cave (R) | Benjamin Gates (R) | 25R, 5D | 204R, 31D, 11I | Warren Austin (R) | Ernest W. Gibson Jr. (R) | Charles A. Plumley (R) | Willkie/ McNary (R) ✗ |
| 1941 | William Henry Wills (R) | Mortimer R. Proctor (R) | Rawson C. Myrick (R) | Alban J. Parker (R) | Thomas H. Cave (R) | David V. Anderson (R) | 22R, 8D | 197R, 37D, 12I | Warren Austin (R) | George Aiken (R) | Charles A. Plumley (R) | Willkie/ McNary (R) ✗ |
| 1942 | William Henry Wills (R) | Mortimer R. Proctor (R) | Rawson C. Myrick (R) | Alban J. Parker (R) | Thomas H. Cave (R) | David V. Anderson (R) | 22R, 8D | 197R, 37D, 12I | Warren Austin (R) | George Aiken (R) | Charles A. Plumley (R) | Willkie/ McNary (R) ✗ |
| 1943 | William Henry Wills (R) | Mortimer R. Proctor (R) | Rawson C. Myrick (R) | Alban J. Parker (R) | Levi R. Kelley (R) | David V. Anderson (R) | 28R, 2D | 206R, 28D, 9I | Warren Austin (R) | George Aiken (R) | Charles A. Plumley (R) | Willkie/ McNary (R) ✗ |
| 1944 | William Henry Wills (R) | Mortimer R. Proctor (R) | Rawson C. Myrick (R) | Alban J. Parker (R) | Levi R. Kelley (R) | David V. Anderson (R) | 28R, 2D | 206R, 28D, 9I | Warren Austin (R) | George Aiken (R) | Charles A. Plumley (R) | Dewey/ Bricker (R) ✗ |
| 1945 | Mortimer R. Proctor (R) | Lee E. Emerson (R) | Rawson C. Myrick (R) | Alban J. Parker (R) | Levi R. Kelley (R) | David V. Anderson (R) | 23R, 7D | 213R, 23D, 10I | Warren Austin (R) | George Aiken (R) | Charles A. Plumley (R) | Dewey/ Bricker (R) ✗ |
| 1946 | Mortimer R. Proctor (R) | Lee E. Emerson (R) | Rawson C. Myrick (R) | Alban J. Parker (R) | Levi R. Kelley (R) | David V. Anderson (R) | 23R, 7D | 213R, 23D, 10I | Warren Austin (R) | George Aiken (R) | Charles A. Plumley (R) | Dewey/ Bricker (R) ✗ |
| 1947 | Ernest W. Gibson Jr. (R) | Lee E. Emerson (R) | Helen Burbank (R) | Clifton G. Parker (R) | Levi R. Kelley (R) | David V. Anderson (R) | 27R, 3D | 209R, 28D, 9I | Ralph Flanders (R) | George Aiken (R) | Charles A. Plumley (R) | Dewey/ Bricker (R) ✗ |
| 1948 | Ernest W. Gibson Jr. (R) | Lee E. Emerson (R) | Helen Burbank (R) | Clifton G. Parker (R) | Levi R. Kelley (R) | David V. Anderson (R) | 27R, 3D | 209R, 28D, 9I | Ralph Flanders (R) | George Aiken (R) | Charles A. Plumley (R) | Dewey/ Warren (R) ✗ |
| 1949 | Ernest W. Gibson Jr. (R) | Harold J. Arthur (R) | Howard E. Armstrong (R) | Clifton G. Parker (R) | George H. Amidon (R) | David V. Anderson (R) | 24R, 6D | 208R, 33D, 5I | Ralph Flanders (R) | George Aiken (R) | Charles A. Plumley (R) | Dewey/ Warren (R) ✗ |
| 1950 | Harold J. Arthur (R) | vacant | Howard E. Armstrong (R) | Clifton G. Parker (R) | George H. Amidon (R) | David V. Anderson (R) | 24R, 6D | 208R, 33D, 5I | Ralph Flanders (R) | George Aiken (R) | Charles A. Plumley (R) | Dewey/ Warren (R) ✗ |
| 1951 | Lee E. Emerson (R) | Joseph B. Johnson (R) | Howard E. Armstrong (R) | Clifton G. Parker (R) | George H. Amidon (R) | David V. Anderson (R) | 29R, 1D | 216R, 22D, 8I | Ralph Flanders (R) | George Aiken (R) | Winston L. Prouty (R) | Dewey/ Warren (R) ✗ |
| 1952 | Lee E. Emerson (R) | Joseph B. Johnson (R) | Howard E. Armstrong (R) | Clifton G. Parker (R) | George H. Amidon (R) | David V. Anderson (R) | 29R, 1D | 216R, 22D, 8I | Ralph Flanders (R) | George Aiken (R) | Winston L. Prouty (R) | Eisenhower/ Nixon (R) ✓ |
| 1953 | Lee E. Emerson (R) | Joseph B. Johnson (R) | Howard E. Armstrong (R) | F. Elliott Barber Jr. (R) | George H. Amidon (R) | David V. Anderson (R) | 27R, 3D | 223R, 18D, 5I | Ralph Flanders (R) | George Aiken (R) | Winston L. Prouty (R) | Eisenhower/ Nixon (R) ✓ |
| 1954 | Lee E. Emerson (R) | Joseph B. Johnson (R) | Howard E. Armstrong (R) | F. Elliott Barber Jr. (R) | George H. Amidon (R) | David V. Anderson (R) | 27R, 3D | 223R, 18D, 5I | Ralph Flanders (R) | George Aiken (R) | Winston L. Prouty (R) | Eisenhower/ Nixon (R) ✓ |
| 1955 | Joseph B. Johnson (R) | Consuelo N. Bailey (R) | Howard E. Armstrong (R) | Robert Stafford (R) | George H. Amidon (R) | David V. Anderson (R) | 23R, 7D | 221R, 25D | Ralph Flanders (R) | George Aiken (R) | Winston L. Prouty (R) | Eisenhower/ Nixon (R) ✓ |
| 1956 | Joseph B. Johnson (R) | Consuelo N. Bailey (R) | Howard E. Armstrong (R) | Robert Stafford (R) | George H. Amidon (R) | David V. Anderson (R) | 23R, 7D | 221R, 25D | Ralph Flanders (R) | George Aiken (R) | Winston L. Prouty (R) | Eisenhower/ Nixon (R) ✓ |
| 1957 | Joseph B. Johnson (R) | Robert Stafford (R) | Howard E. Armstrong (R) | Frederick M. Reed (R) | George H. Amidon (R) | David V. Anderson (R) | 24R, 6D | 212R, 33D, 3I | Ralph Flanders (R) | George Aiken (R) | Winston L. Prouty (R) | Eisenhower/ Nixon (R) ✓ |
| 1958 | Joseph B. Johnson (R) | Robert Stafford (R) | Howard E. Armstrong (R) | Frederick M. Reed (R) | George H. Amidon (R) | David V. Anderson (R) | 24R, 6D | 212R, 33D, 3I | Ralph Flanders (R) | George Aiken (R) | Winston L. Prouty (R) | Eisenhower/ Nixon (R) ✓ |
| 1959 | Robert Stafford (R) | Robert S. Babcock (R) | Howard E. Armstrong (R) | Frederick M. Reed (R) | George H. Amidon (R) | David V. Anderson (R) | 22R, 8D | 200R, 46D | Winston L. Prouty (R) | George Aiken (R) | William H. Meyer (D) | Eisenhower/ Nixon (R) ✓ |
| 1960 | Robert Stafford (R) | Robert S. Babcock (R) | Howard E. Armstrong (R) | Thomas M. Debevoise (R) | George H. Amidon (R) | David V. Anderson (R) | 22R, 8D | 200R, 46D | Winston L. Prouty (R) | George Aiken (R) | William H. Meyer (D) | Nixon/ Lodge (R) ✗ |
| 1961 | F. Ray Keyser Jr. (R) | Ralph A. Foote (R) | Howard E. Armstrong (R) | Thomas M. Debevoise (R) | George H. Amidon (R) | David V. Anderson (R) | 23R, 7D | 190R, 50D, 6I | Winston L. Prouty (R) | George Aiken (R) | Robert Stafford (R) | Nixon/ Lodge (R) ✗ |
| 1962 | F. Ray Keyser Jr. (R) | Ralph A. Foote (R) | Howard E. Armstrong (R) | Charles J. Adams (R) | George H. Amidon (R) | David V. Anderson (R) | 23R, 7D | 190R, 50D, 6I | Winston L. Prouty (R) | George Aiken (R) | Robert Stafford (R) | Nixon/ Lodge (R) ✗ |
| 1963 | Philip H. Hoff (D) | Ralph A. Foote (R) | Howard E. Armstrong (R) | Charles E. Gibson Jr. (R) | George H. Amidon (R) | David V. Anderson (R) | 21R, 9D | 193R, 45D, 8I (Note: Includes 2 Independent Republicans and 1 Independent Democrat.) | Winston L. Prouty (R) | George Aiken (R) | Robert Stafford (R) | Nixon/ Lodge (R) ✗ |
| 1964 | Philip H. Hoff (D) | Ralph A. Foote (R) | Howard E. Armstrong (R) | Charles E. Gibson Jr. (R) | George H. Amidon (R) | David V. Anderson (R) | 21R, 9D | 193R, 45D, 8I | Winston L. Prouty (R) | George Aiken (R) | Robert Stafford (R) | Johnson/ Humphrey (D) ✓ |
| 1965 | Philip H. Hoff (D) | John J. Daley (D) | Harry H. Cooley (D) | John P. Connarn (D) | Peter J. Hincks (D) | Jay H. Gordon (D) | 17R, 13D | 195R, 50D, 1I | Winston L. Prouty (R) | George Aiken (R) | Robert Stafford (R) | Johnson/ Humphrey (D) ✓ |
| 1966 | Philip H. Hoff (D) | John J. Daley (D) | Harry H. Cooley (D) | John P. Connarn (D) | Peter J. Hincks (D) | Jay H. Gordon (D) | 24R, 6D | 135R, 15D | Winston L. Prouty (R) | George Aiken (R) | Robert Stafford (R) | Johnson/ Humphrey (D) ✓ |
| 1967 | Philip H. Hoff (D) | John J. Daley (D) | Harry H. Cooley (D) | James L. Oakes (R) | Peter J. Hincks (D) | Jay H. Gordon (D) | 22R, 8D | 93R, 55D, 2I | Winston L. Prouty (R) | George Aiken (R) | Robert Stafford (R) | Johnson/ Humphrey (D) ✓ |
| 1968 | Philip H. Hoff (D) | John J. Daley (D) | Harry H. Cooley (D) | James L. Oakes (R) | Madelyn Davidson (D) | Jay H. Gordon (D) | 22R, 8D | 93R, 55D, 2I | Winston L. Prouty (R) | George Aiken (R) | Robert Stafford (R) | Nixon/ Agnew (R) ✓ |
| 1969 | Deane C. Davis (R) | Thomas L. Hayes (R) | Richard C. Thomas (R) | Jim Jeffords (R) | Frank H. Davis (R) | Robert T. King (R) | 22R, 8D | 100R, 50D | Winston L. Prouty (R) | George Aiken (R) | Robert Stafford (R) | Nixon/ Agnew (R) ✓ |
| 1970 | Deane C. Davis (R) | Thomas L. Hayes (R) | Richard C. Thomas (R) | Jim Jeffords (R) | Frank H. Davis (R) | Robert T. King (R) | 22R, 8D | 100R, 50D | Winston L. Prouty (R) | George Aiken (R) | Robert Stafford (R) | Nixon/ Agnew (R) ✓ |
| 1971 | Deane C. Davis (R) | John S. Burgess (R) | Richard C. Thomas (R) | Jim Jeffords (R) | Frank H. Davis (R) | Alexander V. Acebo (R) | 22R, 8D | 96R, 54D | Robert Stafford (R) | George Aiken (R) | Richard W. Mallary (R) | Nixon/ Agnew (R) ✓ |
| 1972 | Deane C. Davis (R) | John S. Burgess (R) | Richard C. Thomas (R) | Jim Jeffords (R) | Frank H. Davis (R) | Alexander V. Acebo (R) | 22R, 8D | 96R, 54D | Robert Stafford (R) | George Aiken (R) | Richard W. Mallary (R) | Nixon/ Agnew (R) ✓ |
| 1973 | Thomas P. Salmon (D) | John S. Burgess (R) | Richard C. Thomas (R) | Kimberly B. Cheney (R) | Frank H. Davis (R) | Alexander V. Acebo (R) | 23R, 7D | 91R, 57D, 2I | Robert Stafford (R) | George Aiken (R) | Richard W. Mallary (R) | Nixon/ Agnew (R) ✓ |
| 1974 | Thomas P. Salmon (D) | John S. Burgess (R) | Richard C. Thomas (R) | Kimberly B. Cheney (R) | Frank H. Davis (R) | Alexander V. Acebo (R) | 23R, 7D | 91R, 57D, 2I | Robert Stafford (R) | George Aiken (R) | Richard W. Mallary (R) | Nixon/ Agnew (R) ✓ |
| 1975 | Thomas P. Salmon (D) | Brian D. Burns (D) | Richard C. Thomas (R) | M. Jerome Diamond (D) | Stella Hackel Sims (D) | Alexander V. Acebo (R) | 18R, 12D | 78R, 68D, 4I (Note: A Democrat, Timothy J. O'Connor Jr., was elected as Speaker.) | Robert Stafford (R) | Patrick Leahy (D) | Jim Jeffords (R) | Nixon/ Agnew (R) ✓ |
| 1976 | Thomas P. Salmon (D) | Brian D. Burns (D) | Richard C. Thomas (R) | M. Jerome Diamond (D) | Stella Hackel Sims (D) | Alexander V. Acebo (R) | 18R, 12D | 78R, 68D, 4I | Robert Stafford (R) | Patrick Leahy (D) | Jim Jeffords (R) | Ford/ Dole (R) ✗ |
| 1977 | Richard A. Snelling (R) | T. Garry Buckley (R) | James A. Guest (D) | M. Jerome Diamond (D) | Emory A. Hebard (R) | Alexander V. Acebo (R) | 21R, 9D | 75R, 73D, 2I | Robert Stafford (R) | Patrick Leahy (D) | Jim Jeffords (R) | Ford/ Dole (R) ✗ |
| 1978 | Richard A. Snelling (R) | T. Garry Buckley (R) | James A. Guest (D) | M. Jerome Diamond (D) | Emory A. Hebard (R) | Alexander V. Acebo (R) | 21R, 9D | 75R, 73D, 2I | Robert Stafford (R) | Patrick Leahy (D) | Jim Jeffords (R) | Ford/ Dole (R) ✗ |
| 1979 | Richard A. Snelling (R) | Madeleine Kunin (D) | James A. Guest (D) | M. Jerome Diamond (D) | Emory A. Hebard (R) | Alexander V. Acebo (R) | 20R, 10D | 79R, 69D, 2I | Robert Stafford (R) | Patrick Leahy (D) | Jim Jeffords (R) | Ford/ Dole (R) ✗ |
| 1980 | Richard A. Snelling (R) | Madeleine Kunin (D) | James A. Guest (D) | M. Jerome Diamond (D) | Emory A. Hebard (R) | Alexander V. Acebo (R) | 20R, 10D | 79R, 69D, 2I | Robert Stafford (R) | Patrick Leahy (D) | Jim Jeffords (R) | Reagan/ Bush (R) ✓ |
| 1981 | Richard A. Snelling (R) | Madeleine Kunin (D) | Jim Douglas (R) | John J. Easton Jr. (R) | Emory A. Hebard (R) | Alexander V. Acebo (R) | 16R, 14D | 84R, 63D, 2I, 1C | Robert Stafford (R) | Patrick Leahy (D) | Jim Jeffords (R) | Reagan/ Bush (R) ✓ |
| 1982 | Richard A. Snelling (R) | Madeleine Kunin (D) | Jim Douglas (R) | John J. Easton Jr. (R) | Emory A. Hebard (R) | Alexander V. Acebo (R) | 16R, 14D | 84R, 63D, 2I, 1C | Robert Stafford (R) | Patrick Leahy (D) | Jim Jeffords (R) | Reagan/ Bush (R) ✓ |
| 1983 | Richard A. Snelling (R) | Peter Plympton Smith (R) | Jim Douglas (R) | John J. Easton Jr. (R) | Emory A. Hebard (R) | Alexander V. Acebo (R) | 17R, 13D | 84R, 65D, 1I | Robert Stafford (R) | Patrick Leahy (D) | Jim Jeffords (R) | Reagan/ Bush (R) ✓ |
| 1984 | Richard A. Snelling (R) | Peter Plympton Smith (R) | Jim Douglas (R) | John J. Easton Jr. (R) | Emory A. Hebard (R) | Alexander V. Acebo (R) | 17R, 13D | 84R, 65D, 1I | Robert Stafford (R) | Patrick Leahy (D) | Jim Jeffords (R) | Reagan/ Bush (R) ✓ |
| 1985 | Madeleine Kunin (D) | Peter Plympton Smith (R) | Jim Douglas (R) | Jeffrey Amestoy (R) | Emory A. Hebard (R) | Alexander V. Acebo (R) | 18D, 12R | 77R, 72D, 1I (Note: A Democrat, Ralph G. Wright, was elected as Speaker.) | Robert Stafford (R) | Patrick Leahy (D) | Jim Jeffords (R) | Reagan/ Bush (R) ✓ |
| 1986 | Madeleine Kunin (D) | Peter Plympton Smith (R) | Jim Douglas (R) | Jeffrey Amestoy (R) | Emory A. Hebard (R) | Alexander V. Acebo (R) | 18D, 12R | 77R, 72D, 1I | Robert Stafford (R) | Patrick Leahy (D) | Jim Jeffords (R) | Reagan/ Bush (R) ✓ |
| 1987 | Madeleine Kunin (D) | Howard Dean (D) | Jim Douglas (R) | Jeffrey Amestoy (R) | Emory A. Hebard (R) | Alexander V. Acebo (R) | 18D, 12R | 75D, 74R, 1I | Robert Stafford (R) | Patrick Leahy (D) | Jim Jeffords (R) | Reagan/ Bush (R) ✓ |
| 1988 | Madeleine Kunin (D) | Howard Dean (D) | Jim Douglas (R) | Jeffrey Amestoy (R) | Emory A. Hebard (R) | Alexander V. Acebo (R) | 18D, 12R | 75D, 74R, 1I | Robert Stafford (R) | Patrick Leahy (D) | Jim Jeffords (R) | Bush/ Quayle (R) ✓ |
| 1989 | Madeleine Kunin (D) | Howard Dean (D) | Jim Douglas (R) | Jeffrey Amestoy (R) | Paul W. Ruse Jr. (D) | Alexander V. Acebo (R) | 16D, 14R | 76D, 74R | Jim Jeffords (R) | Patrick Leahy (D) | Peter Plympton Smith (R) | Bush/ Quayle (R) ✓ |
| 1990 | Madeleine Kunin (D) | Howard Dean (D) | Jim Douglas (R) | Jeffrey Amestoy (R) | Paul W. Ruse Jr. (D) | Alexander V. Acebo (R) | 16D, 14R | 76D, 74R | Jim Jeffords (R) | Patrick Leahy (D) | Peter Plympton Smith (R) | Bush/ Quayle (R) ✓ |
| 1991 | Richard A. Snelling (R) | Howard Dean (D) | Jim Douglas (R) | Jeffrey Amestoy (R) | Paul W. Ruse Jr. (D) | Alexander V. Acebo (R) | 15D, 15R (Note: Lt. Governor Howard Dean broke the tie, giving power to the Democrats.) | 75R, 73D, 2VP | Jim Jeffords (R) | Patrick Leahy (D) | Bernie Sanders (I) (Note: Sanders has caucused with Congressional Democrats for his entire tenure, though remains a registered Independent.) | Bush/ Quayle (R) ✓ |
| 1992 | Howard Dean (D) | vacant | Jim Douglas (R) | Jeffrey Amestoy (R) | Paul W. Ruse Jr. (D) | Alexander V. Acebo (R) | 15D, 15R | 75R, 73D, 2VP | Jim Jeffords (R) | Patrick Leahy (D) | Bernie Sanders (I) | Clinton/ Gore (D) ✓ |
| 1993 | Howard Dean (D) | Barbara Snelling (R) | Donald M. Hooper (D) | Jeffrey Amestoy (R) | Paul W. Ruse Jr. (D) | Ed Flanagan (D) | 16R, 14D | 87D, 57R, 4I, 2VP | Jim Jeffords (R) | Patrick Leahy (D) | Bernie Sanders (I) | Clinton/ Gore (D) ✓ |
| 1994 | Howard Dean (D) | Barbara Snelling (R) | Donald M. Hooper (D) | Jeffrey Amestoy (R) | Paul W. Ruse Jr. (D) | Ed Flanagan (D) | 16R, 14D | 87D, 57R, 4I, 2VP | Jim Jeffords (R) | Patrick Leahy (D) | Bernie Sanders (I) | Clinton/ Gore (D) ✓ |
| 1995 | Howard Dean (D) | Barbara Snelling (R) | James F. Milne (R) | Jeffrey Amestoy (R) | Jim Douglas (R) | Ed Flanagan (D) | 18R, 12D | 86D, 61R, 2VP, 1I | Jim Jeffords (R) | Patrick Leahy (D) | Bernie Sanders (I) | Clinton/ Gore (D) ✓ |
| 1996 | Howard Dean (D) | Barbara Snelling (R) | James F. Milne (R) | Jeffrey Amestoy (R) | Jim Douglas (R) | Ed Flanagan (D) | 18R, 12D | 86D, 61R, 2VP, 1I | Jim Jeffords (R) | Patrick Leahy (D) | Bernie Sanders (I) | Clinton/ Gore (D) ✓ |
| 1997 | Howard Dean (D) | Doug Racine (D) | James F. Milne (R) | William Sorrell (D) | Jim Douglas (R) | Ed Flanagan (D) | 17D, 13R | 89D, 57R, 3VP, 1I | Jim Jeffords (R) | Patrick Leahy (D) | Bernie Sanders (I) | Clinton/ Gore (D) ✓ |
| 1998 | Howard Dean (D) | Doug Racine (D) | James F. Milne (R) | William Sorrell (D) | Jim Douglas (R) | Ed Flanagan (D) | 17D, 13R | 89D, 57R, 3VP, 1I | Jim Jeffords (R) | Patrick Leahy (D) | Bernie Sanders (I) | Clinton/ Gore (D) ✓ |
| 1999 | Howard Dean (D) | Doug Racine (D) | Deborah Markowitz (D) | William Sorrell (D) | Jim Douglas (R) | Ed Flanagan (D) | 17D, 13R | 77D, 66R, 4VP, 2I, 1L | Jim Jeffords (R) | Patrick Leahy (D) | Bernie Sanders (I) | Clinton/ Gore (D) ✓ |
| 2000 | Howard Dean (D) | Doug Racine (D) | Deborah Markowitz (D) | William Sorrell (D) | Jim Douglas (R) | Ed Flanagan (D) | 17D, 13R | 77D, 66R, 4VP, 2I, 1L | Jim Jeffords (R) | Patrick Leahy (D) | Bernie Sanders (I) | Gore/ Lieberman (D) ✗ |
| 2001 | Howard Dean (D) | Doug Racine (D) | Deborah Markowitz (D) | William Sorrell (D) | Jim Douglas (R) | Elizabeth M. Ready (D) | 16D, 14R | 83R, 62D, 4VP, 1I | Jim Jeffords (I) (Note: Sen. Jeffords left the Republican party on May 24, 2001 and caucused with Democrats until his retirement.) | Patrick Leahy (D) | Bernie Sanders (I) | Gore/ Lieberman (D) ✗ |
| 2002 | Howard Dean (D) | Doug Racine (D) | Deborah Markowitz (D) | William Sorrell (D) | Jim Douglas (R) | Elizabeth M. Ready (D) | 16D, 14R | 82R, 63D, 4P, 1I (Note: Democrat Tim Ryan replaced Republican Tom McGrath on January 8, 2002.) | Jim Jeffords (I) | Patrick Leahy (D) | Bernie Sanders (I) | Gore/ Lieberman (D) ✗ |
| 2003 | Jim Douglas (R) | Brian Dubie (R) | Deborah Markowitz (D) | William Sorrell (D) | Jeb Spaulding (D) | Elizabeth M. Ready (D) | 19D, 11R | 73R, 70D, 4VP, 3I | Jim Jeffords (I) | Patrick Leahy (D) | Bernie Sanders (I) | Gore/ Lieberman (D) ✗ |
| 2004 | Jim Douglas (R) | Brian Dubie (R) | Deborah Markowitz (D) | William Sorrell (D) | Jeb Spaulding (D) | Elizabeth M. Ready (D) | 19D, 11R | 74R, 69D, 4VP, 3I | Jim Jeffords (I) | Patrick Leahy (D) | Bernie Sanders (I) | Kerry/ Edwards (D) ✗ |
| 2005 | Jim Douglas (R) | Brian Dubie (R) | Deborah Markowitz (D) | William Sorrell (D) | Jeb Spaulding (D) | Randy Brock (R) | 21D, 9R | 83D, 60R, 6VP, 1I | Jim Jeffords (I) | Patrick Leahy (D) | Bernie Sanders (I) | Kerry/ Edwards (D) ✗ |
| 2006 | Jim Douglas (R) | Brian Dubie (R) | Deborah Markowitz (D) | William Sorrell (D) | Jeb Spaulding (D) | Randy Brock (R) | 21D, 9R | 83D, 60R, 6VP, 1I | Jim Jeffords (I) | Patrick Leahy (D) | Bernie Sanders (I) | Kerry/ Edwards (D) ✗ |
| 2007 | Jim Douglas (R) | Brian Dubie (R) | Deborah Markowitz (D) | William Sorrell (D) | Jeb Spaulding (D) | Thomas M. Salmon (D) | 23D, 7R | 93D, 49R, 6VP, 2I | Bernie Sanders (I) | Patrick Leahy (D) | Peter Welch (D) | Kerry/ Edwards (D) ✗ |
| 2008 | Jim Douglas (R) | Brian Dubie (R) | Deborah Markowitz (D) | William Sorrell (D) | Jeb Spaulding (D) | Thomas M. Salmon (D) | 23D, 7R | 93D, 49R, 6VP, 2I | Bernie Sanders (I) | Patrick Leahy (D) | Peter Welch (D) | Obama/ Biden (D) ✓ |
| 2009 | Jim Douglas (R) | Brian Dubie (R) | Deborah Markowitz (D) | William Sorrell (D) | Jeb Spaulding (D) | Thomas M. Salmon (R) | 23D, 7R | 94D, 48R, 5VP, 3I | Bernie Sanders (I) | Patrick Leahy (D) | Peter Welch (D) | Obama/ Biden (D) ✓ |
| 2010 | Jim Douglas (R) | Brian Dubie (R) | Deborah Markowitz (D) | William Sorrell (D) | Jeb Spaulding (D) | Thomas M. Salmon (R) | 23D, 7R | 94D, 48R, 5VP, 3I | Bernie Sanders (I) | Patrick Leahy (D) | Peter Welch (D) | Obama/ Biden (D) ✓ |
| 2011 | Peter Shumlin (D) | Phil Scott (R) | Jim Condos (D) (Note: In 2016, Sec. Condos was elected on the "Democratic/Republican" ballot line.) | William Sorrell (D) | Beth Pearce (D) (Note: In 2016, Treasurer Pearce was elected on the "Democratic/Republican" ballot line.) | Thomas M. Salmon (R) | 21D, 8R, 1VP | 94D, 48R, 5VP, 3I | Bernie Sanders (I) | Patrick Leahy (D) | Peter Welch (D) | Obama/ Biden (D) ✓ |
| 2012 | Peter Shumlin (D) | Phil Scott (R) | Jim Condos (D) | William Sorrell (D) | Beth Pearce (D) | Thomas M. Salmon (R) | 21D, 8R, 1VP | 94D, 48R, 5VP, 3I | Bernie Sanders (I) | Patrick Leahy (D) | Peter Welch (D) | Obama/ Biden (D) ✓ |
| 2013 | Peter Shumlin (D) | Phil Scott (R) | Jim Condos (D) | William Sorrell (D) | Beth Pearce (D) | Doug Hoffer (D/VP) (Note: From 2012–2018 and from 2022–2024, Auditor Hoffer was elected on the "Democratic/Progressive" ballot line. In 2020, he was elected on the "Democratic/Republican" ballot line.) | 21D, 7R, 2VP | 96D, 45R, 5VP, 4I | Bernie Sanders (I) | Patrick Leahy (D) | Peter Welch (D) | Obama/ Biden (D) ✓ |
| 2014 | Peter Shumlin (D) | Phil Scott (R) | Jim Condos (D) | William Sorrell (D) | Beth Pearce (D) | Doug Hoffer (D/VP) | 21D, 7R, 2VP | 96D, 45R, 5VP, 4I | Bernie Sanders (I) | Patrick Leahy (D) | Peter Welch (D) | Obama/ Biden (D) ✓ |
| 2015 | Peter Shumlin (D) | Phil Scott (R) | Jim Condos (D) | William Sorrell (D) | Beth Pearce (D) | Doug Hoffer (D/VP) | 19D, 9R, 2VP | 85D, 53R, 6VP, 6I | Bernie Sanders (I) | Patrick Leahy (D) | Peter Welch (D) | Obama/ Biden (D) ✓ |
| 2016 | Peter Shumlin (D) | Phil Scott (R) | Jim Condos (D) | William Sorrell (D) | Beth Pearce (D) | Doug Hoffer (D/VP) | 19D, 9R, 2VP | 85D, 53R, 6VP, 6I | Bernie Sanders (I) | Patrick Leahy (D) | Peter Welch (D) | Clinton/ Kaine (D) ✗ |
| 2017 | Phil Scott (R) | David Zuckerman (VP/D) | Jim Condos (D) | T. J. Donovan (D) | Beth Pearce (D) | Doug Hoffer (D/VP) | 21D, 7R, 2VP | 83D, 53R, 7VP, 7I | Bernie Sanders (I) | Patrick Leahy (D) | Peter Welch (D) | Clinton/ Kaine (D) ✗ |
| 2018 | Phil Scott (R) | David Zuckerman (VP/D) | Jim Condos (D) | T. J. Donovan (D) | Beth Pearce (D) | Doug Hoffer (D/VP) | 21D, 7R, 2VP | 83D, 53R, 7VP, 7I | Bernie Sanders (I) | Patrick Leahy (D) | Peter Welch (D) | Clinton/ Kaine (D) ✗ |
| 2019 | Phil Scott (R) | David Zuckerman (VP/D) | Jim Condos (D) | T. J. Donovan (D) | Beth Pearce (D) | Doug Hoffer (D/VP) | 22D, 6R, 2VP | 95D, 43R, 7VP, 5I | Bernie Sanders (I) | Patrick Leahy (D) | Peter Welch (D) | Clinton/ Kaine (D) ✗ |
| 2020 | Phil Scott (R) | David Zuckerman (VP/D) | Jim Condos (D) | T. J. Donovan (D) | Beth Pearce (D) | Doug Hoffer (D/VP) | 22D, 6R, 2VP | 95D, 43R, 7VP, 5I | Bernie Sanders (I) | Patrick Leahy (D) | Peter Welch (D) | Biden/ Harris (D) ✓ |
| 2021 | Phil Scott (R) | Molly Gray (D) | Jim Condos (D) | T. J. Donovan (D) | Beth Pearce (D) | Doug Hoffer (D/VP) | 21D, 7R, 2VP | 92D, 46R, 7VP, 5I | Bernie Sanders (I) | Patrick Leahy (D) | Peter Welch (D) | Biden/ Harris (D) ✓ |
| 2022 | Phil Scott (R) | Molly Gray (D) | Jim Condos (D) | T. J. Donovan (D) | Beth Pearce (D) | Doug Hoffer (D/VP) | 21D, 7R, 2VP | 92D, 46R, 7VP, 5I | Bernie Sanders (I) | Patrick Leahy (D) | Peter Welch (D) | Biden/ Harris (D) ✓ |
| 2022 | Phil Scott (R) | Molly Gray (D) | Jim Condos (D) | Susanne Young (R) | Beth Pearce (D) | Doug Hoffer (D/VP) | 21D, 7R, 2VP | 92D, 46R, 7VP, 5I | Bernie Sanders (I) | Patrick Leahy (D) | Peter Welch (D) | Biden/ Harris (D) ✓ |
| 2023 | Phil Scott (R) | David Zuckerman (VP/D) | Sarah Copeland Hanzas (D) | Charity Clark (D) | Mike Pieciak (D) | Doug Hoffer (D/VP) | 22D, 7R, 1VP | 104D, 38R, 5VP, 3I | Bernie Sanders (I) | Peter Welch (D) | Becca Balint (D) | Biden/ Harris (D) ✓ |
| 2023 | Phil Scott (R) | David Zuckerman (VP/D) | Sarah Copeland Hanzas (D) | Charity Clark (D) | Mike Pieciak (D) | Doug Hoffer (D/VP) | 22D, 7R, 1VP | 104D, 37R, 5VP, 3I, 1L (Note: Jarrod Sammis switched parties from Republican to Libertarian.) | Bernie Sanders (I) | Peter Welch (D) | Becca Balint (D) | Biden/ Harris (D) ✓ |
| 2024 | Phil Scott (R) | David Zuckerman (VP/D) | Sarah Copeland Hanzas (D) | Charity Clark (D) | Mike Pieciak (D) | Doug Hoffer (D/VP) | 22D, 7R, 1VP | 105D, 37R, 4VP, 3I, 1L (Note: Democrat Abbey Duke was appointed to succeed Progressive Emma Mulvaney-Stanak, who resigned.) | Bernie Sanders (I) | Peter Welch (D) | Becca Balint (D) | Harris/ Walz (D) ✗ |
| 2025 | Phil Scott (R) | John S. Rodgers (R) | Sarah Copeland Hanzas (D) | Charity Clark (D) | Mike Pieciak (D) | Doug Hoffer (D/VP) | 16D, 13R, 1VP | 87D, 56R, 4VP, 3I | Bernie Sanders (I) | Peter Welch (D) | Becca Balint (D) | Harris/ Walz (D) ✗ |
| 2026 | Phil Scott (R) | John S. Rodgers (R) | Sarah Copeland Hanzas (D) | Charity Clark (D) | Mike Pieciak (D) | Doug Hoffer (D/VP) | 16D, 13R, 1VP | 87D, 56R, 4VP, 3I | Bernie Sanders (I) | Peter Welch (D) | Becca Balint (D) | Harris/ Walz (D) ✗ |
| 2027 | Phil Scott (R) | Molly Gray (D) | Sarah Copeland Hanzas (D) | Charity Clark (D) | Mike Pieciak (D) | Tim Ashe (D) | 20D, 8R, 1VP, 1I | 102D, 38R, 7VP, 3I | Bernie Sanders (I) | Peter Welch (D) | Becca Balint (D) | Harris/ Walz (D) ✗ |

Key to party colors and abbreviations for members of the U.S. Congress and other politicians or officials
| Alaskan Independence (AKIP) Know Nothing (KN) American Labor (AL) Anti-Jacksonian (Anti-J); National Republican (NR) Anti-Administration (AA) Anti-Masonic (Anti-M) Conservative (Con) Covenant (Cov) | Democratic (D) Democratic–Farmer–Labor (DFL) Democratic–NPL (D-NPL) Dixiecrat (Dix), States' Rights (SR) Democratic-Republican (DR) Farmer–Labor (FL) Federalist (F); Pro-Administration (PA) | Free Soil (FS) Fusion (Fus) Greenback (GB) Independence (IPM) Jacksonian (J) Liberal (Lib) Libertarian (L) National Union (NU) | Nonpartisan League (NPL) Nullifier (N) Opposition Northern (O); Opposition Southern (O) Populist (Pop) Progressive (Prog) Prohibition (Proh) Readjuster (Rea) | Republican (R) Silver (Sv) Silver Republican (SvR) Socialist (Soc) Union (U) Unconditional Union (UU) Vermont Progressive (VP) Whig (W) | Independent (I) Nonpartisan (NP) |

== See also ==
- Vermont
- Politics of Vermont
- Elections in Vermont
- Government of Vermont
