= Senator Dubois (disambiguation) =

Fred Dubois (1851–1930) was a U.S. Senator from Idaho from 1891 to 1897 and from 1901 to 1907. Senator Dubois or Dubose may also refer to:

- William H. Dubois (1835–1907), Vermont State Senate
- William DuBois (architect) (1879–1953), Wyoming State Senate
- William DuBose (politician) (1786/87–1855), South Carolina State Senate
