= Senator Field =

Senator Field may refer to:

- Harry Field (American football) (1911–1964), Hawaii State Senate
- Henry F. Field (1843–1932), Vermont State Senate
- Richard Stockton Field (1803–1870), U.S. Senator from New Jersey from 1862 to 1863
- Robert C. Field (1804–1876), Wisconsin State Senate

== See also ==
- Senator Fields (disambiguation)
