= John Lement Bacon =

American politician

John F. Bacon
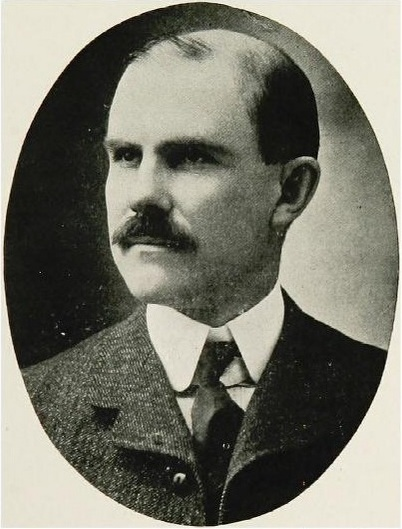

16th Vermont State Treasurer
- In office October 1898 – 1906
- Governor: Edward C. Smith; William W. Stickney; John G. McCullough; Charles J. Bell
- Preceded by: Henry F. Field
- Succeeded by: Edward H. Deavitt

Member of the Vermont House of Representatives
- In office 1892–1894
- Preceded by: Frank O'Neill
- Succeeded by: Frank E. Watson
- Constituency: Hartford

Treasurer of Orange County, Vermont
- In office 1884–1885

Personal details
- Born: June 18, 1862 Chelsea, Vermont, U.S.
- Died: April 27, 1909 (aged 46) Hartford, Vermont, U.S.
- Resting place: Hartford Point Cemetery, Hartford, Vermont, U.S.
- Party: Republican
- Education: St. Johnsbury Academy, St. Johnsbury, Vermont, U.S.
- Occupation: Businessman; Banker

John Lement Bacon (June 18, 1862 – April 27, 1909) was a Vermont banker, businessman and politician who served as State Treasurer.

== Early life ==
John L. Bacon was born in Chelsea, Vermont on June 18, 1862. He attended school in Chelsea and graduated from St. Johnsbury Academy. In 1881 he began a career in banking at the First National Bank of Chelsea of which his father was President, and he became Cashier in 1883.

== Early career ==
A Republican, Bacon served as Orange County Treasurer from 1884 to 1885.

When the National Bank of White River Junction was organized in 1886, Bacon relocated to Hartford and was appointed Cashier (while Maxwell Evarts was President), and he held this position until his death.

From 1891 to 1898 Bacon served as Hartford's Town Treasurer. From 1892 to 1894 he served in the Vermont House of Representatives.

He was also involved in several businesses, including the Ottaquechee Woolen Company and the Fairground Railroad Company.

== State Treasurer ==
Bacon was elected state treasurer in 1898, and served until 1906.

At the time, Vermont's treasurer and secretary of state also served as Vermont's insurance commissioners, and Bacon was elected secretary, vice president and president of the National Convention of Insurance Commissioners.

== Later career ==
After serving as state treasurer, Bacon continued his banking and business career. In 1908 he returned to the Vermont House and was appointed chairman of the Appropriations Committee.

== Death and burial ==
Bacon died in Hartford on April 27, 1909. He was interred in a family vault at Hartford Point Cemetery.

== Home ==
In Hartford Bacon purchased the house and farm that had once been owned by Lieutenant Governor Joseph Marsh, and christened the property "Marshland." The home still stands and has been operated as the Quechee Inn at Marshland Farm.

Party political offices
Preceded by Henry F. Field	Republican nominee for Vermont State Treasurer; 1898, 1900, 1902, 1904	Succeeded by Edward H. Deavitt
Political offices
Preceded by Henry F. Field	Vermont State Treasurer; 1898–1906	Succeeded by Edward H. Deavitt
