= Senator Fields =

Senator Fields may refer to:

- Cleo Fields (born 1962), Louisiana State Senate
- Eddie Fields (born 1967), Oklahoma State Senate
- Harvey Fields (politician) (1882–1961), Louisiana State Senate
- Rhonda Fields (fl. 2000s–2010s), Colorado State Senate
- Thomas C. Fields (1825–1885), New York State Senate

== See also ==
- Senator Field (disambiguation)
