= George H. Amidon =

Vermont State Treasurer (1904–1976)

21st Vermont State Treasurer
- In office 1949–1965
- Preceded by: Levi R. Kelley
- Succeeded by: Peter J. Hincks

Vermont Commissioner of Taxes
- In office 1945–1949
- Preceded by: Erwin M. Harvey
- Succeeded by: Clyde M. Coffrin (acting)

Personal details
- Born: July 12, 1904 Littleton, New Hampshire
- Died: November 28, 1976 (aged 72) Berlin, Vermont
- Resting place: McIndoe Falls Cemetery, Barnet, Vermont
- Party: Republican
- Spouse: Theresa Jean Liddle (m. 1929–1976, his death)
- Children: 2
- Education: Boston University
- Occupation: Store owner Public official

George H. Amidon (July 12, 1904 – November 28, 1976) was a Vermont businessman and state official. He was most notable for his service as state commissioner of taxes from 1945 to 1949 and Vermont State Treasurer from 1949 to 1965.

== Early life ==
George Hilton Amidon was born in Littleton, New Hampshire, on July 12, 1904, the fourth of seven sons of Mary Walker and Freeman Amidon. The Amidon family resided in Barnet, Vermont, and George Amidon graduated from Wells River High School. In 1926 he graduated from Boston University’s College of Business Administration.

== Early career ==
From 1929 to 1934, Amidon owned and operated a store in Barnet, Vermont, with his brothers, Perley and Theodore. In the late 1930s, he moved to Montpelier, where he served as a field auditor, first in the office of the Auditor of Accounts of Vermont, Benjamin Gates, from 1938 to 1940, and after that for the National Life Insurance Company (later part of the National Life Group). He was appointed Deputy State Treasurer on April 6, 1943, by State Treasurer Levi R. Kelley. In February 1945, Governor Mortimer R. Proctor appointed him to serve as Vermont's Commissioner of Taxes and he was reappointed by Governor Ernest W. Gibson, Jr. in 1947 and 1949.

== State treasurer ==
In September 1949, incumbent treasurer Levi R. Kelley resigned to become treasurer and business manager for the University of Vermont, and Gibson appointed Amidon to complete Kelley's term. Amidon was elected to a full term as a Republican in 1950, and he was reelected every two years until 1964, when he lost his race for reelection. During this time period, the state treasurer managed the state's investments personally and Amidon's work enabled Vermont to maintain its AAA bond rating.

In 1964, Democrat Peter J. Hincks defeated Amidon for State Treasurer, winning as part of the Democratic wave brought in by the landslide victory of Lyndon B. Johnson. Hinck's victory marked the first time Republicans had lost control of the office. The Republican Party had won every statewide election in Vermont for more than 100 years after the party's founding in 1855. As part of a concerted effort to make the Democratic party more viable by running legitimate candidates for all statewide offices, Hincks had run unsuccessfully every two years from 1938 to 1946, and again in 1950 and 1962. After the election, he admitted that he was surprised to have won, and effusively praised Amidon's tenure. Amidon served as a consultant to Hincks for six months after the end of his term in order to help with the transition.

== Later career ==
Amidon served as a trustee of Vermont Junior College (later the Vermont College of Fine Arts) beginning in 1955, and in 1956 he was elected to the board of directors of the Montpelier National Bank and Chairman of the Board of Trustees of Montpelier's Bethany Congregational Church. He also served as treasurer of the Vermont Division of the American Cancer Society and of the Calvin Coolidge Memorial Foundation. In addition he was a vice president and director of the Vermont Mutual Insurance Company, and a director of Vermont–New Hampshire Blue Cross and Blue Shield.

After leaving office, Amidon served as senior vice president and trust officer of the Montpelier National Bank. In 1965, he was elected treasurer of the Vermont Republican State Committee. Despite an effort by the Republican party to persuade him to run, in 1966 he declined to be a candidate for Lieutenant Governor of Vermont.

== Death and burial ==
Amidon died at the hospital in Berlin, Vermont, on November 28, 1976, after suffering a heart attack at his home in Montpelier. He was buried at McIndoe Falls Cemetery in Barnet, Vermont.

== Family ==
Amidon married Theresa Jean Liddle in Barnet in 1929. They were the parents of two children, Thomas and Janet.

Party political offices
Preceded by Levi R. Kelley	Republican nominee for Vermont State Treasurer; 1950, 1952, 1954, 1956, 1958, 1960, 1962, 1964	Succeeded by John R. Perry
Political offices
Preceded by Levi R. Kelley	Vermont State Treasurer; 1949–1965	Succeeded by Peter J. Hincks
