= John A. Page =

American politician and banker (1814-1891)

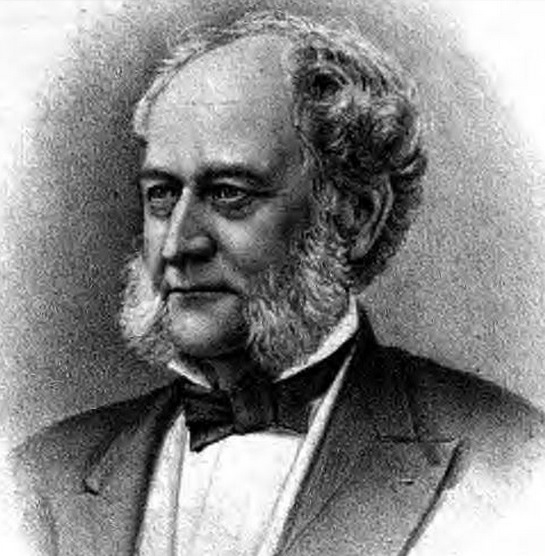

13th Vermont State Treasurer
- In office October, 1866 – October, 1882
- Governor: Paul Dillingham; John B. Page; Peter T. Washburn; George W. Hendee; John W. Stewart; Julius Converse; Asahel Peck; Horace Fairbanks; Redfield Proctor; Roswell Farnham
- Preceded by: John B. Page
- Succeeded by: William H. Dubois

10th Vermont State Treasurer
- In office October, 1853 – October 1854
- Governor: John S. Robinson
- Preceded by: George Howes
- Succeeded by: Henry M. Bates

Member of the Vermont House of Representatives from Danville
- In office 1848–1849
- Preceded by: Asa Morrill
- Succeeded by: Harvey T. Moore

Personal details
- Born: June 17, 1814 Haverhill, New Hampshire
- Died: August 23, 1891 (aged 77) Montpelier, Vermont
- Resting place: Green Mount Cemetery, Montpelier, Vermont
- Party: Democratic (to 1855); Republican (after 1855)
- Spouse: Martha Ward
- Relations: John Page (father)
- Children: 1
- Education: Haverhill Academy
- Profession: Businessman; Banker

John A. Page (June 17, 1814 – August 23, 1891) was a Vermont banker and political figure who served as Vermont State Treasurer.

== Early life ==
John Alfred Page was born in Haverhill, New Hampshire on June 17, 1814. He was the son of John Page and Hannah Merrill. John Page served in the United States Senate and as Governor of New Hampshire.

The younger Page was educated in Haverhill and graduated from Haverhill Academy. He trained to be a merchant, working as a clerk at dry goods stores in Portland, Maine and Haverhill. The Haverhill store in which he worked closed during the Panic of 1837, and Page began a career in banking as cashier of the Grafton Bank.

In 1848 Page moved to Danville, Vermont to accept the position of Cashier at the Caledonia Bank. A Democrat in politics, he served in the Vermont House of Representatives from 1848 to 1849.

Page became associated with Erastus Fairbanks in 1849 as Financial Agent for the Passumpsic and Connecticut Rivers Railroad, and relocated to Newbury.

== Later career ==
Later in 1849, Page was appointed cashier of the Vermont Bank and moved to Montpelier, where he lived for the rest of his life. In 1852, he ran for Vermont State Treasurer, and was defeated by George Howes.

From 1853 to 1854, Page served as Vermont State Treasurer, succeeding George Howes. He finished second in the balloting, and was chosen by the Vermont General Assembly after a multi-candidate election in which no candidate received the majority required by the Vermont Constitution. In 1854 he was defeated for another term by Henry M. Bates. He also lost an 1855 rematch to Bates.

The First National Bank of Vermont was organized in 1865, and Page was elected a member of the board of directors and appointed as the bank’s President.

By then a Republican, in 1866 Page was again elected State Treasurer, succeeding John B. Page. He served until 1882, and was succeeded by William H. Dubois.

== Death ==
Page retired from most of his business interests in 1882, but continued to serve as President of the First National Bank until January, 1891. He died in Montpelier on August 23, 1891. Page was buried at Green Mount Cemetery in Montpelier.

== Family ==
John A. Page was married to Martha Ward of Haverhill. They had one son, John W. Page (1847-1930), who worked with his father in Montpelier and later moved to Nebraska to raise cattle and Louisiana to operate a rice plantation.

Party political offices
Preceded by E. C. Redington	Democratic nominee for Vermont State Treasurer; 1852, 1853, 1854, 1855	Succeeded by James T. Thurston
Preceded by John B. Page	Republican nominee for Vermont State Treasurer; 1866, 1867, 1868, 1869, 1870, 1872, 1874, 1876, 1878, 1880	Succeeded by William H. Dubois
Political offices
Preceded by George Howes	Vermont State Treasurer; 1853–1854	Succeeded by Henry M. Bates
Preceded by John B. Page	Vermont State Treasurer; 1866–1882	Succeeded by William H. Dubois
