= Henry M. Bates =

American politician (1808–1865)

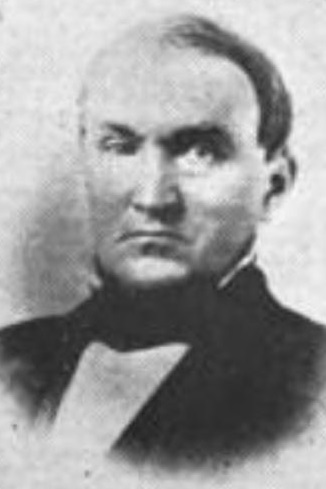
Henry Miner Bates, Vermont State Treasurer.

Henry Miner Bates (July 4, 1808—August 20, 1865) was an American banker and politician who served as Vermont State Treasurer for six years.

== Early life ==
Henry Miner Bates was born in Hartland, Vermont on July 4, 1808, the son of Jacob and Charity (Paddock) Bates. He studied law in preparation for a career as an attorney, and in 1839 accepted an appointment as clerk of the courts in Orleans County, Vermont, a position in which he served until 1849.

== Early career ==
Bates was elected town clerk of Irasburg in 1841, and served until 1850. In addition, he served in other local offices, including justice of the peace.

Bates was active in the Episcopal church. He also advocated restrictions on the consumption of alcoholic beverages as an officer of the Vermont Temperance Society, and served as secretary of the Orleans County Agricultural Society.

From 1846 to 1849 he was a Whig member of the Vermont House of Representatives, and in 1850 and 1851 he was a member of the Vermont Senate.

In 1850 Bates was appointed cashier of the Bank of Orleans, and he held this position until 1854, when he moved to Northfield, Washington County to become cashier of the Northfield Bank.

Bates was also involved in several local businesses in Northfield, including the Northfield Slate Company and the Northfield Gas Light Company.

== State Treasurer ==
In 1854 he was elected Vermont State Treasurer as a Republican, and he served until 1860. After he left office, an audit determined that his state accounts were in arrears, and a subsequent investigation determined that Bates' defalcation amounted to at least $50,000 (about $1.3 million in 2016).

Bates had been empowered to borrow money on the state's behalf; he had taken out several loans of which he made no record, and used the money on speculative investments, including marble and soapstone businesses and the Van Ness farm, now known as the Ethan Allen Homestead. His misconduct came to light when one of the banks which had made such a loan contacted Bates' successor, who could find no record of it. Thus exposed, Bates indicated that he had intended to repay the money, but the investments had failed.

He temporarily fled Vermont, but returned to Northfield about two months later, after the Vermont General Assembly passed a law indicating that Bates would not be subject to arrest provided that he met with commissioners to negotiate a settlement. Bates and the commissioners agreed to have the state accept real estate and other items of value from Bates to satisfy the majority of his debt, while the individuals who had posted surety bonds to guarantee Bates' performance as treasurer, mostly businessmen in Northfield, were required to pay amounts ranging from one to 600 dollars.

== Death ==
Bates died in Northfield on August 20, 1865, and was buried in Northfield.

== Family ==
In 1832 Bates married Nancy Farrar Chapman. They were the parents of three children: Caroline, Harriette, and George C.

Party political offices
First	Republican nominee for Vermont State Treasurer; 1854, 1855, 1856, 1857, 1858, 1859	Succeeded by John B. Page
Political offices
Preceded by John A. Page	Vermont State Treasurer; 1854–1860	Succeeded by John B. Page
