= Peter J. Hincks =

Banker and public official

Peter J. Hincks (July 3, 1883 – July 7, 1968) was a Vermont banker and public official. He was notable for his service as Vermont State Treasurer from 1965 until his death, the first Democrat to hold the office since the founding of the Republican Party in the 1850s.

== Biography ==
Peter Joseph Hincks was born in West Rutland, Vermont on July 3, 1883. He attended the schools of Proctor and Rutland Business College, and then began a banking career with the National Bank of Middlebury. Hincks remained with the bank for more than 50 years, and eventually became its vice president and treasurer and a member of its board of directors.

Hincks served in local office including village trustee, and was active in civic and charitable organizations, including the Knights of Columbus. Vermont Republicans won every statewide election for more than 100 years beginning with the founding of the party in the mid-1850s. Hincks was a Democrat, and as part of a concerted effort to make the party more viable in Vermont by running legitimate candidates for all statewide races, he ran for state treasurer every two years from 1938 to 1946, and again in 1950 and 1962.

In 1964 ran for State Treasurer again. He won as part of the Democratic wave brought in by the landslide victory of Lyndon B. Johnson, defeating longtime incumbent George H. Amidon. Hincks won reelection in 1966, and served from January, 1965 until his death.

== Death and burial ==
He was planning to run for reelection in 1968, but collapsed while attending mass on July 7, 1968, and died at Middlebury's Porter Hospital. He was buried at Saint Marys Cemetery in Middlebury.

== Family ==
On October 15, 1912, Hincks married Elizabeth Honoria Creegan in Beacon, New York. Their children included daughters Mary, Katherine, and Alice, and son Philip.

Party political offices
Preceded by B. P. O'Connor	Democratic nominee for Vermont State Treasurer; 1938, 1940, 1942, 1944, 1946	Succeeded by John Edward Moran
Preceded by John Edward Moran	Democratic nominee for Vermont State Treasurer; 1952	Succeeded by Charles P. McDevitt
Preceded by Raymond H. Moore	Democratic nominee for Vermont State Treasurer; 1962, 1964, 1966	Succeeded by Madelyn Davidson
Political offices
Preceded by George H. Amidon	Vermont State Treasurer; 1965–1968	Succeeded by Madelyn Davidson
