= Vermont State Treasurer =

Treasurer of the US state of Vermont

State Treasurer of Vermont
- Seal of the State Treasurer of Vermont

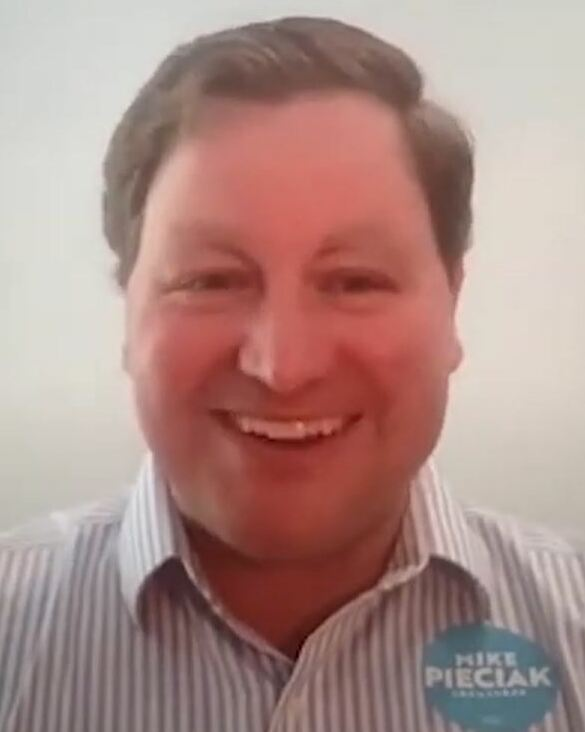
- Incumbent; Mike Pieciak since January 5, 2023
- Style: The Honorable
- Term length: Two years, no term limit
- Inaugural holder: Ira Allen; 1778
- Formation: Constitution of Vermont
- Website: State Treasurer's Office

The State Treasurer's Office is responsible for several administrative and service duties, in accordance with Vermont Statutes. These include: investing state funds; issuing state bonds; serving as the central bank for state agencies; managing the state's cash balances, check processing and reconciliation; safeguarding and returning unclaimed or abandoned financial property; and administering three major pension plans for public employees. The treasurer is fifth (behind the lieutenant governor, speaker of the House of Representatives, president pro tempore of the Senate, and secretary of state, respectively) in the line of succession to the office of Governor of Vermont.

The incumbent is Mike Pieciak who assumed in the office in January 2023. He succeeded Beth Pearce, who was appointed to the office in January, 2011 when Jeb Spaulding resigned to become Secretary of Administration in the cabinet of Governor Peter Shumlin, and was subsequently elected and re-elected. Pearce had been Spaulding's deputy.

== List of Vermont state treasurers (1778–present) ==
| Image | Name | Term of office | Political party |
|---|---|---|---|
| | Ira Allen | 1778–1786 | No party affiliation |
| | Samuel Mattocks | 1786–1800 | No party affiliation |
| | Benjamin Swan | 1800–1833 | Federalist, Independent |
| | Augustine Clarke | 1833–1837 | Anti-Masonic |
| | Allen Wardner | 1837–1838 | Whig |
| | Henry Fisk Janes | 1838–1841 | Whig |
| | John Spaulding | 1841–1846 | Whig |
| | Elisha P. Jewett | 1846–1847 | Whig |
| | George Howes | 1847–1853 | Whig |
| | John A. Page | 1853–1854 | Democratic |
| | Henry M. Bates | 1854–1860 | Republican |
| | John B. Page | 1860–1866 | Republican |
| | John A. Page | 1866–1882 | Republican |
| | William H. Dubois | 1882–1890 | Republican |
| | Henry F. Field | 1890–1898 | Republican |
| | John L. Bacon | 1898–1906 | Republican |
| | Edward H. Deavitt | 1906–1915 | Republican |
| | Walter F. Scott | 1915–1923 | Republican |
| | Thomas H. Cave | 1923–1943 | Republican |
| | Levi R. Kelley | 1943–1949 | Republican |
| | George H. Amidon | 1949–1965 | Republican |
| | Peter J. Hincks | 1965–1968 | Democratic |
| | Madelyn Davidson | 1968–1969 | Democratic |
| | Frank H. Davis | 1969–1975 | Republican |
| | Stella B. Hackel | 1975–1977 | Democratic |
| | Emory A. Hebard | 1977–1989 | Republican |
| | Paul W. Ruse Jr. | 1989–1995 | Democratic |
| | James H. Douglas | 1995–2003 | Republican |
| | George B. "Jeb" Spaulding | 2003–2011 | Democratic |
| | Beth Pearce | 2011–2023 | Democratic |
| | Mike Pieciak | 2023–present | Democratic |
