= Edward H. Deavitt =

American politician (1871–1946)

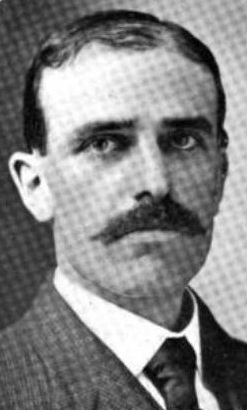
- Deavitt in 1906

17th Vermont State Treasurer
- In office 1906–1915
- Governor: Fletcher D. Proctor; George H. Prouty; John A. Mead; Allen M. Fletcher
- Preceded by: John L. Bacon
- Succeeded by: Walter F. Scott

Speaker of the Vermont House of Representatives
- In office 1931–1933
- Preceded by: Benjamin Williams
- Succeeded by: George Aiken

Personal details
- Born: Edward Harrington Deavitt; December 1, 1871 Moretown, Vermont, U.S.
- Died: October 2, 1946 (aged 74) Montpelier, Vermont, U.S.
- Party: Republican
- Education: University of Vermont, Harvard Law School
- Occupation: Politician, banker, attorney

Edward Harrington Deavitt (December 1, 1871 – October 2, 1946) was an American politician, attorney and businessman who served as Vermont State Treasurer and Speaker of the Vermont House of Representatives.

== Biography ==
Deavitt was born in Moretown, Vermont on December 1, 1871. He was raised in Montpelier, graduated from the University of Vermont in 1893, received a law degree from Harvard Law School in 1896 and became an attorney, first in Boston, and later in Montpelier.

In addition to practicing law Deavitt was involved in several businesses, including serving on the boards of directors of several banks and local utilities and an executive of a Montpelier granite manufacturing company.

A Republican, Deavitt served as a member of the state board of bar examiners and a bankruptcy referee in the late 1890s and early 1900s. In 1906, Deavitt was the successful candidate for State Treasurer, and served until 1915.

In the mid-1920s Deavitt served as an aide to Governor Franklin S. Billings before resigning to become the state Commissioner of Finance.

Deavitt served as a member of Montpelier's City Council from 1923 to 1926, and Mayor of Montpelier from 1926 to 1930.

In 1928, Deavitt ran unsuccessfully in the Republican primary election for Governor of Vermont. Incumbent John E. Weeks ran successfully for reelection, arguing that the Vermont Republican party's "Mountain Rule" limiting governors to two years in office should not apply because Weeks was best able to lead the state's recovery from the great flood of 1927. Political observers regarded Deavitt's challenge to Weeks as a half-hearted effort to maintain the Mountain Rule.

In 1930, Deavitt was elected to the Vermont House of Representatives. He was chosen Speaker and served from 1931 to 1933.

After leaving the legislature Deavitt resumed his business interests, including serving as President of the Green Mountain Mutual Fire Insurance Company.

Deavitt died in Montpelier on October 2, 1946.

Party political offices
| Preceded by John Lement Bacon | Republican nominee for Vermont State Treasurer; 1906, 1908, 1910, 1912 | Succeeded by Walter F. Scott |
Political offices
| Preceded by John L. Bacon | Vermont State Treasurer; 1906–1915 | Succeeded by Walter F. Scott |
| Preceded by Benjamin Williams | Speaker of the Vermont House of Representatives; 1931–1933 | Succeeded by George Aiken |
