= Madelyn Davidson =

American banker, politician, and government official

Madelyn Davidson (August 26, 1913—February 5, 1998) was a Vermont banker, political figure, and government official. She was notable for her service as Vermont State Treasurer following an appointment to fill a vacancy, the first woman to hold the position. Davidson lost election for a full term in her own right, and later served as Vermont's Commissioner of Employment Security.

== Early life ==
Davidson was born Madelyn Helen Suitor in the hamlet of Websterville, Barre Town, Vermont on August 26, 1913. She attended the schools of Barre Town and in 1931 she graduated from Spaulding High School in Barre City. Davidson attended Simmons College, but left before graduating because of financial hardships caused by the Great Depression.

After leaving college, Davidson worked in a variety of positions with the Vermont Emergency Relief Administration, the agency created to plan and oversee completion of Federal Emergency Relief Administration projects and programs in Vermont. During World War II, Davidson was employed in Vermont by the federal Office of Price Administration.

== Banking career ==
In the early 1950s, Davidson resided in Montpelier and began a career with the Montpelier National Bank. She became the bank's clerk in 1954, secretary and assistant trust officer in 1956, assistant vice president in 1958, and vice president in 1960. Davidson was also active in several local civic and business organizations, including serving as president of the Montpelier Chamber of Commerce and the Greater Vermont Association (Vermont Chamber of Commerce). She was also a member of the state and national advisory councils for the Small Business Administration. In addition, Davidson was treasurer of the Central Vermont Community Action Council, an associate trustee of Saint Michael's College, and a member of Vermont's Judicial Selection Committee.

Davidson was also active in politics as a Democrat. She served as a member of the Vermont Democratic State Committee for several years, including terms as the party treasurer. In 1962 she was the unsuccessful Democratic nominee for Vermont Secretary of State.

== State treasurer ==
On July 7, 1968, incumbent state treasurer Peter J. Hincks died. On July 29, Governor Philip H. Hoff appointed Davidson to fill the vacancy. Davidson was the first woman to hold the post, and was the Democratic nominee for a full term in the November, 1968 election. She lost her bid for a two-year term to Republican Frank H. Davis, a member of the Vermont House of Representatives from Burlington.

== Later career ==
After losing the race for state treasurer, Davidson resumed her career with the Montpelier National Bank. In February, 1973, Thomas P. Salmon, who had recently begun his term as Governor of Vermont, named Davidson to serve as state Commissioner of Employment Security. Davidson served as commissioner until retiring in January, 1977, at the start of Richard A. Snelling's administration.

== Retirement and death ==
In retirement, Davidson resided in the Barre Town hamlet of South Barre. She later lived at an elder care facility in Morristown, where she died on February 5, 1998. Davidson was buried at Wilson Cemetery in Barre Town.

== Family ==
Davidson was the daughter of George Suitor and Rose (Olsen) Suitor).

In 1931, she married Theodore R. Davidson. They were the parents of a daughter named Sylvia, and later divorced.

Davidson's uncle, Fred W. Suitor, was active in politics as a socialist, and served as mayor of Barre City from 1929 to 1931.

Party political offices
Preceded by James N. Kennedy	Democratic nominee for Secretary of State of Vermont; 1962	Succeeded by Harry H. Cooley
Preceded by Peter J. Hincks	Democratic nominee for Vermont State Treasurer; 1968	Succeeded by George J. Kingston, Jr.
Political offices
Preceded by Peter J. Hincks	Vermont State Treasurer; 1968–1969	Succeeded by Frank H. Davis
