= Levi R. Kelley =

American businessman & politician (1899–1967)

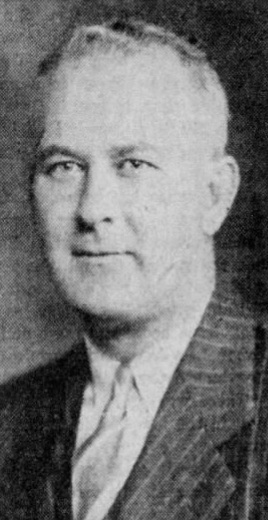
- Montpelier Evening Argus, 9 September 1942

20th Vermont State Treasurer
- In office January 7, 1943 – August 31, 1949
- Preceded by: Thomas H. Cave
- Succeeded by: George H. Amidon

Personal details
- Born: January 26, 1899 Malone, New York, U.S.
- Died: February 14, 1967 (aged 68) Waterbury, Vermont, U.S.
- Resting place: Green Mount Cemetery, Montpelier, Vermont, U.S.
- Party: Republican
- Spouse: Ruth Emery (m. 1919)
- Children: 5
- Education: Montpelier High School, Montpelier, Vermont, U.S.
- Profession: Business manager and treasurer

Military service
- Allegiance: United States
- Service: United States Army
- Years of service: 1917–1918
- Rank: Sergeant
- Unit: Officer Training School, Camp Gordon, Georgia, U.S.
- Wars: World War I

Levi R. Kelley (January 26, 1899 – February 14, 1967) was a Vermont political figure. A Republican, he served as Vermont State Treasurer and later as treasurer of the University of Vermont.

== Biography ==
Levi Ray Kelley was born in Malone, New York on January 26, 1899, a son of Michael Kelley and Ella (Duke) Kelley, and his family moved to Montpelier, Vermont in 1902. Kelley attended the public schools of Montpelier, and graduated from Montpelier High School in 1917.

On June 23, 1917, Kelley joined the United States Army for World War I. He completed quartermaster training at Camp Jackson, South Carolina, and was promoted through the ranks to the grade of sergeant. He began officer training school at Camp Gordon, Georgia, but was discharged on November 30, 1918, shortly after the end of the war.

After his military service, Kelley began a business career, and became billing clerk and cashier for the Montpelier and Wells River Railroad.

In 1919 Kelley married Ruth Emery in Belmont, Massachusetts. They were the parents of five children: Jerome; Frank; David; Lee; and Nancy.

In 1924 Kelley began to work in the office of the Vermont State Treasurer. In 1926 he was appointed Assistant State Treasurer. In 1931 he was appointed Deputy State Treasurer.

Kelley was elected Vermont State Treasurer in 1942. He served from 1943 to 1949, when he resigned.

He resigned as state treasurer in August, 1949 in order to accept appointment as treasurer and business manager of the University of Vermont. He worked for UVM until retiring in 1959.

Kelley died in Waterbury, Vermont on February 14, 1967. He was buried at Green Mount Cemetery in Montpelier.

Party political offices
Preceded by Thomas H. Cave	Republican nominee for Vermont State Treasurer; 1942, 1944, 1946, 1948	Succeeded by George H. Amidon
Political offices
Preceded by Thomas H. Cave	Vermont State Treasurer; 1943–1949	Succeeded by George H. Amidon
