= Henry F. Field =

American banker and politician from Vermont

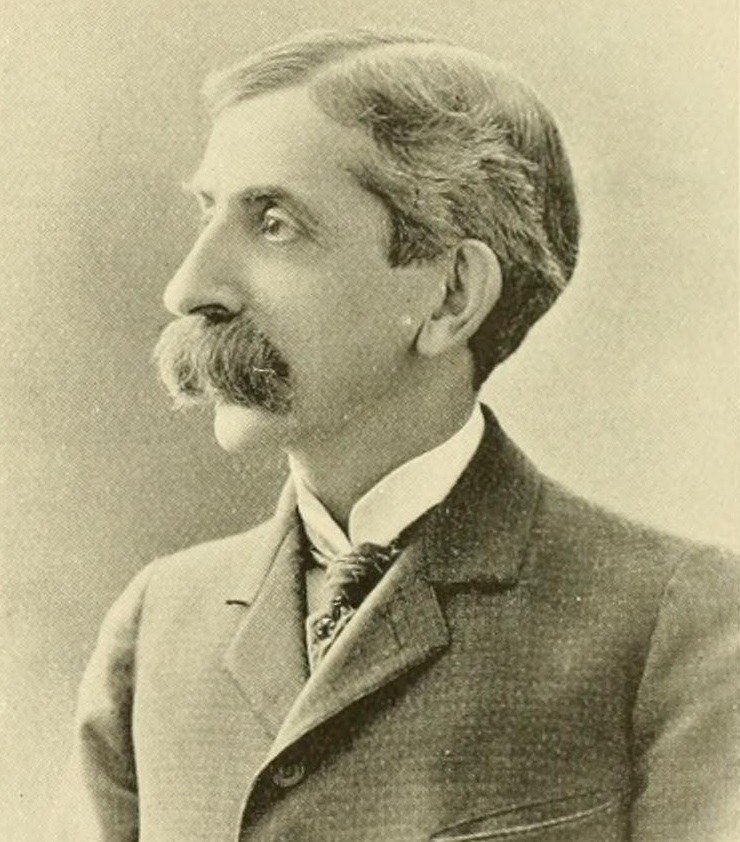

15th Vermont State Treasurer
- In office October, 1890 – October 1898
- Governor: Caroll S. Page; Levi K. Fuller; Urban A. Woodbury; Josiah Grout
- Preceded by: William H. Dubois
- Succeeded by: John Lement Bacon

Member of the Vermont House of Representatives from Rutland
- In office 1888–1890
- Preceded by: James F. Hogan
- Succeeded by: Thomas W. Moloney

Member of the Vermont Senate from Rutland County
- In office 1884–1886 Serving with Leonard Johnson, Edwin Horton, Ansel Leroy Hill
- Preceded by: Aldace F. Walker, Walter E. Howard, Charles D. Childs, Charles S. Colburn
- Succeeded by: Joel C. Baker, Henry L. Clark, Phillips E. Chase, Albert Y. Gray

Personal details
- Born: October 8, 1843 Brandon, Vermont
- Died: March 9, 1932 (aged 88) Rutland, Vermont
- Resting place: Pine Hill Cemetery, Brandon, Vermont
- Party: Republican
- Spouses: Annie Louisa Howe; (1865-1913)
- Children: 2
- Parents: William M. Field (father); Minerva Field (mother)
- Relatives: Fred A. Field (brother)
- Education: Brandon Seminary, Brandon, Vermont
- Occupation: Banker

Henry Francis Field (October 8, 1843 March 9, 1932) was a Vermont banker and political figure who served as Vermont State Treasurer for eight years in the late 1800s.

== Early life ==
Henry Francis Field was born in Brandon, Vermont on October 8, 1843, the son of Minerva (Davenport) Field and William M. Field, who served as sheriff of Rutland County, president of the Rutland Savings Bank, and a member of the Vermont Senate. He attended the schools of Brandon, and graduated from Brandon Seminary. In 1858 and 1859 he was an assistant doorkeeper of the Vermont Senate. At age 17 he began a banking career as a clerk at the Brandon Bank. A year later he moved to Rutland to become a clerk for John B. Page, who was then serving as state treasurer. In 1861 he also served for a brief time as Vermont's deputy secretary of state.

== Start of career ==
In 1864 Field became a teller at the Bank of Rutland (later the Rutland National Bank). After three years he left this position to become cashier of the Rutland County National Bank, whose other officers included Page, William Y. W. Ripley, and Edward H. Ripley. Field was subsequently appointed to the bank's board of directors.

== Political career ==
Field served as treasurer for the town of Rutland from 1876 to 1886, and before the village of Rutland was incorporated as a city he served as village treasurer. In 1877 he became treasurer of Rutland County, and he served until his death.

A Republican, in 1884 Field served in the Vermont Senate, and was chairman of its banking committee. In 1888 he served in the Vermont House of Representatives, and was chairman of that chamber's banking committee.

In 1890 Field was elected Vermont State Treasurer. He was reelected three times, and served until 1898.

In 1894 Field received the honorary degree of Master of Arts from the University of Vermont.

== Later life ==
In 1906 Field became president of the Rutland County National Bank.

Field was long active in Rutland's Congregational church, and frequently served as superintendent or a teacher in its Sunday school.

In the early 1900s Field was one of the incorporators of the Rutland YMCA.

Fields was also active in the American Bankers Association, including serving as its vice president for Vermont.

== Death and burial ==
Field died in Rutland on March 9, 1932. He was buried at Pine Hill Cemetery in Brandon.

== Family ==
In 1865 Field married Annie Louisa Howe (1843-1913), whose father was prominent as the founder of the Howe Scale Company. They were the parents of two sons, John Howe Field (1871-1940) and William Henry Field (1877-1935).

William Henry Field was the husband of Ethel S. Clement, and the son-in-law of Percival W. Clement, who served as Governor of Vermont from 1919 to 1921.

Field's siblings included Fred A. Field, who served as United States Marshal for the District of Vermont from 1898 to 1903.

Party political offices
Preceded by William H. Dubois	Republican nominee for Vermont State Treasurer; 1890, 1892, 1894, 1896	Succeeded by John Lement Bacon
Political offices
Preceded by William H. Dubois	Vermont State Treasurer; 1890–1898	Succeeded by John L. Bacon
