= Walter F. Scott =

American banker and politician from Vermont

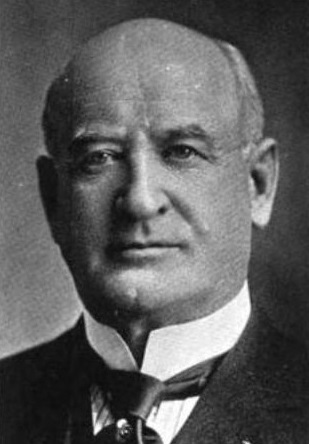

18th Vermont State Treasurer
- In office 1915–1923
- Governor: Charles W. Gates; Horace F. Graham; Percival W. Clement; James Hartness
- Preceded by: Edward H. Deavitt
- Succeeded by: Thomas H. Cave

Member of the Vermont Senate from Rutland County
- In office 1908–1909 Serving with Eugene McIntyre; William Franklin Walker; Fred M. Butler
- Preceded by: Henry Otis Carpenter; Dan Demin Burditt; John Emory Buxton; William H. Rowland
- Succeeded by: Henry B. Barden; Henry L. Clark; Samuel R. Hitchcock; Egbert Clayton Tuttle

Member of the Vermont House of Representatives from Brandon
- In office 1906–1907
- Preceded by: Lewis J. Fortier
- Succeeded by: Tom W. Ray

Personal details
- Born: December 5, 1856 Barre, Vermont, US
- Died: February 15, 1938 (aged 81) Brandon, Vermont, US
- Resting place: Greenwood Cemetery, St. Albans, Vermont
- Party: Republican
- Spouse: Lucretia Ballard (m. 1920)
- Education: Goddard Seminary
- Occupation: Banker; Farmer

Walter F. Scott (December 5, 1856 – February 15, 1938) was an American banker and politician from Brandon, Vermont. A Republican, he served in the Vermont House of Representatives and Vermont Senate, and as Vermont State Treasurer.

== Biography ==
Scott was born in Barre, Vermont on December 5, 1856. He was educated at Goddard Seminary in Barre. In 1873 he became a resident of Brandon.

== Banking career ==
He worked as a clerk for the Central Vermont Railway. In 1880 he began a banking career as a teller at the Brandon National Bank. Scott became the bank's cashier in 1883.

Scott also operated a farm, which included breeding Ayrshire cattle.

== Political career ==
A Republican, he served as Brandon's town treasurer and a justice of the peace for many years. He represented Brandon in the Vermont House of Representatives in 1906. In 1908 he served in the Vermont Senate.

== State treasurer ==
In 1914 Scott was the successful Republican nominee for state treasurer. He was reelected in 1916, 1918, and 1920, and served from 1915 to 1923.

== Later career ==
Scott became president of the Brandon National Bank, and remained active until his death.

== Fraternal memberships ==
In addition to being active in Brandon's Masonic lodge, Scott was active in both Royal Arch Masonry and the Knights Templar.

== Family ==
Having remained a bachelor until he was over 60, in 1920 Scott married Lucretia Ballard, the divorced mother of a son who was born in 1920.

== Death and burial ==
Scott died in Brandon on February 15, 1938. He was buried at Greenwood Cemetery in St. Albans, Vermont.

Party political offices
Preceded by Edward H. Deavitt	Republican nominee for Vermont State Treasurer; 1914, 1916, 1918, 1920	Succeeded by Thomas H. Cave
Political offices
Preceded by Edward H. Deavitt	Vermont State Treasurer; 1915–1923	Succeeded by Thomas H. Cave
