= Thomas H. Cave =

American politician

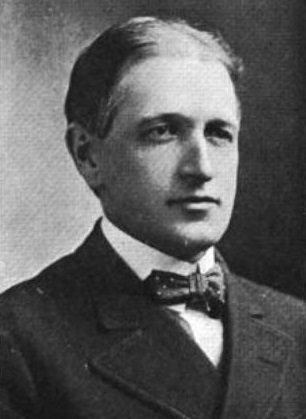

19th Vermont State Treasurer
- In office 1923–1943
- Governor: Redfield Proctor Jr.; Franklin S. Billings; John E. Weeks; Stanley C. Wilson; Charles M. Smith; George David Aiken; William H. Wills
- Preceded by: Walter F. Scott
- Succeeded by: Levi R. Kelley

Member of the Vermont House of Representatives from Barre City
- In office 1910–1912
- Preceded by: George N. Tilden
- Succeeded by: Richard Grigg

Personal details
- Born: July 16, 1870 Berlin, Vermont, U.S.
- Died: October 20, 1958 (aged 88) Barre City, Vermont, U.S.
- Resting place: Hope Cemetery, Barre City, Vermont, U.S.
- Party: Republican
- Spouse: Kate C. Humphrey Eastman (m. 1906)
- Occupation: Accountant; Banker

Thomas H. Cave (July 16, 1870 – October 20, 1958) was a Vermont political figure who served as State Treasurer.

== Early life ==
Thomas H. Cave, Jr. was born in Berlin, Vermont on July 16, 1870. He was educated in Montpelier, Vermont and worked briefly as an insurance agent before becoming Secretary of the Granite Manufacturers' Association in Barre. In 1902 he began work at the National Bank of Barre, where he rose to the position of Cashier.

Cave also received his qualification as a Certified Public Accountant.

A Republican, he was elected to the Vermont House of Representatives in 1910 and served one term.

== State Treasurer ==
In 1912 Cave was appointed Deputy State Treasurer. He served in this post until taking office as State Treasurer.

In 1922 Cave was the successful Republican nominee for Treasurer. He served 10 terms, from 1923 to 1943. Cave's 20 years as Treasurer make his tenure the second-longest in Vermont history, behind only Benjamin Swan, who served from 1800 to 1833.

== Later career ==
While serving as Treasurer Cave was also Vice President of Montpelier's Capital Savings Bank and Trust Company. After retiring as Treasurer he continued at the bank with the title of Vice President and Trust Officer.

== Retirement, death and burial ==
In retirement, Cave continued to reside in Barre. He died in Barre on October 20, 1958. He was buried in Barre's Hope Cemetery.

== Family ==
On 18 December 1906, Cave married Kate C. Humphrey Eastman, the widow of William H. Eastman. She was the mother of daughters Corinne Eastman and Doris Eastman. Corinne Eastman (1901–1951) was the wife of Deane C. Davis, who served as governor of Vermont from 1969 to 1973.

Party political offices
Preceded by Walter F. Scott	Republican nominee for Vermont State Treasurer; 1922, 1924, 1926, 1928, 1930, 1932, 1934, 1936, 1938, 1940	Succeeded by Levi R. Kelley
Political offices
Preceded by Walter F. Scott	Vermont State Treasurer; 1923–1943	Succeeded by Levi R. Kelley
