= John B. Page =

American businessman and politician (1826–1885)

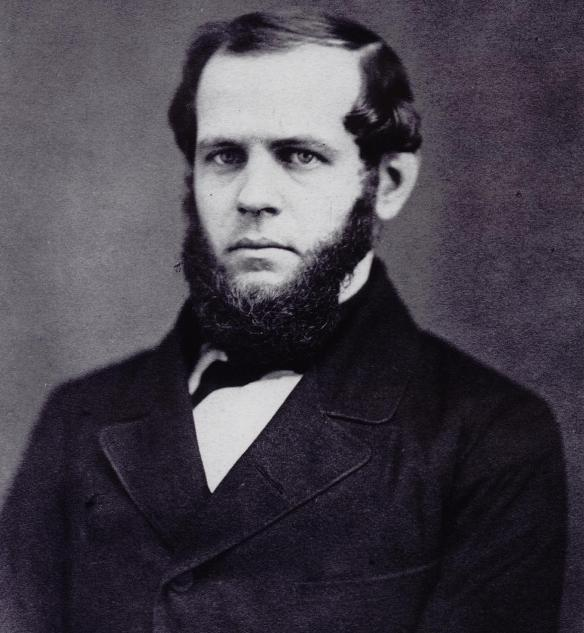

30th Governor of Vermont
- In office October 13, 1867 – October 15, 1869
- Lieutenant: Stephen Thomas
- Preceded by: Paul Dillingham
- Succeeded by: Peter T. Washburn

Vermont State Treasurer
- In office October 13, 1860 – October 18, 1866
- Governor: Erastus Fairbanks; Frederick Holbrook; J. Gregory Smith; Paul Dillingham
- Preceded by: Henry M. Bates
- Succeeded by: John A. Page

Member of the Vermont House of Representatives from Rutland Town
- In office 1880–1882
- Preceded by: Lyman W. Redington
- Succeeded by: W. C. Landon
- In office 1852–1855
- Preceded by: Martin G. Everts
- Succeeded by: William F. Barnes

Personal details
- Born: February 25, 1826 Rutland Town, Vermont, US
- Died: October 24, 1885 (aged 59) Rutland Town, Vermont, US
- Resting place: Evergreen Cemetery, Rutland, Vermont
- Party: Whig (before 1855); Republican (from 1855)
- Spouse(s): Mary Ann Reynolds (m. 1848-1872, her death); Harriett Ellen Smith (m. 1875-1885, his death)
- Children: 8
- Education: Burr Seminary, Manchester, Vermont
- Profession: Businessman

John Boardman Page (February 25, 1826 – October 24, 1885) was an American businessman and politician from Vermont. He served as Vermont State Treasurer from 1860 to 1866 and was the 30th governor of Vermont from 1867 to 1869.

== Biography ==
Page was born in Rutland City, Vermont (then a village in Rutland Town), on February 25, 1826, a son of William Page and Cynthia Amanda (Hickok) Page. He was educated in the public schools of Rutland and attended Burr Seminary in Manchester, Vermont (now Burr and Burton Academy).

== Business career ==
Page's father was cashier of the Bank of Rutland, and after completing his seminary education at age 16 or 17, Page joined his father at the bank. He worked as a clerk and teller, then became the bank's cashier in 1849, when his father was appointed the bank's president. Page served as cashier until 1866, when he succeeded his father as president. He continued to serve as president until retiring in 1884. Page was also a partner in the Brandon Manufacturing Company (producer of Howe Scales). In addition, he was a partner in the Sutherland Falls Marble Company, which was later acquired by the Vermont Marble Company. Page was also involved in the insurance business and was an incorporator of the New England Fire Insurance Company.

In addition to his career at the Bank of Rutland, in 1852 Page was an original incorporator of the Rutland Savings Bank, and was appointed as its treasurer. He was also president of the Rutland Railroad, vice president of the Central Vermont Railroad, and a shareholder or director of the Bennington and Rutland, West Shore, Vermont Valley, Montreal and Plattsburgh, and Plattsburgh and Whitehall Railroads, as well as several other local and regional rail lines. In addition, he was involved in shipping as a director of the Lake Champlain Transportation Company and the Caughnawaga Ship Canal project that was intended to link Upstate New York, Vermont, and Canada.

== Civic activism and philanthropy ==
Page was a promoter of education, and worked to consolidate and modernize the Rutland school system. In addition, he was a trustee of Middlebury College and a member of the Burr and Burton Academy board of trustees. He was also an organizer and member of Rutland's volunteer fire department, and led the committee that created the city's first municipal water supply.

A Congregationalist, Page was a devoted member of Rutland's Grace Church and served as Sunday school superintendent and deacon. He was also the head of the building committee which oversaw construction of a new building for the church in 1860 as well as subsequent improvements and additions. Page was active with the American Board of Commissioners for Foreign Missions and earned national headlines in 1876 when he volunteered to raise money to pay off the organization's debt. He raised more than $40,000 in just a few hours, including his own $5,000 contribution, ensuring the organization could balance future budgets and continue its work.

== Political career ==
=== State legislator ===
Page represented Rutland in the Vermont House of Representatives from 1852 to 1855. Originally a Whig, he became a Republican when the party was founded in the mid-1850s.

=== State treasurer ===
In 1860, Page was elected Vermont State Treasurer. he was reelected annually until 1865 and served from 1860 to 1866. During the American Civil War, Page was appointed by President Abraham Lincoln as a federal allotment commissioner, responsible for visiting Vermont soldiers in the field, collecting money from their pay, and distributing it to their families in Vermont. He was also responsible for the financing of Vermont's pro-Union efforts during the war, including recruiting, training, equipping, and paying soldiers. The state's efforts included bond issues and other financial instruments designed to raise money and repay it over time, and Page was commended for his successful management of the wartime enterprise.

=== Governor ===
Page was elected Governor of Vermont in 1867. He was reelected in 1868, and served from October 1867 to October 1869. As governor, Page ensured that the state government completed its process of auditing Vermont's wartime finances and accounting for funds raised and spent during the Civil War. He also implemented plans for increased state aid to local school systems and proposed legislation that would have exempted new manufacturing businesses from state taxes for up to five years. In keeping with the Republican Party's Mountain Rule, Page was not a candidate for reelection in 1869.

== Later life ==
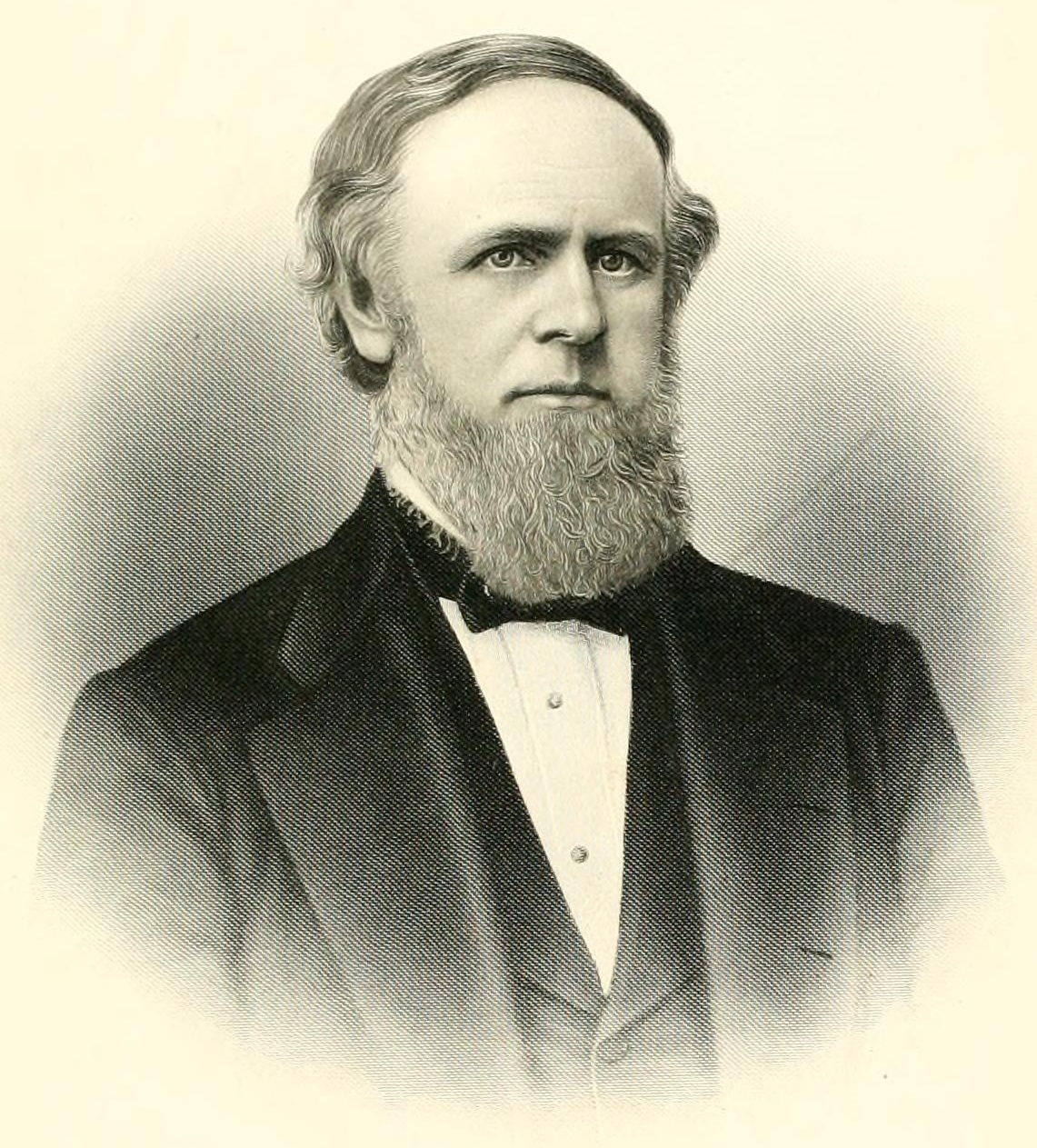
Page in his later years. From 1886's History of Rutland County, Vermont.

After leaving the governorship, Page returned to his banking and business pursuits. He declined most requests to resume participation in politics, but did agree to serve a term in the Vermont House of Representatives again from 1880 to 1882 and as moderator of Rutland's village meeting in 1884.

Page was the defendant in a nationally publicized 1885 lawsuit brought by the family of Percival W. Clement, which had bought a majority stake in the Rutland Railroad and attempted to recover $125,000 ($4 million in 2008) which it said Page had defrauded the company of while he was its president. The Bank of Rutland was liquidated to cover the losses, and Howe Scales was placed into receivership. Page blamed an employee of the bank and said he had also lost personal funds in the fraud. Though he initially was the subject of unfavorable public opinion, sentiment turned to Page's favor as evidence was presented in a trial that lasted more than four months. The proceedings ended in May with Page's vindication; he was found not liable for the losses. In addition, the new owners of the railroad were found to have damaged Page's reputation, for which he was awarded $1 as token compensation.

== Death and burial ==
Page died in Rutland on October 24, 1885. His funeral took place at Grace Church, and pallbearers included Redfield Proctor and William Y. W. Ripley. Page was interred at Evergreen Cemetery in Rutland.

== Family ==
In 1848, Page married Mary Ann Reynolds with whom he had four children—Susan, William, Edward, and Helen. With his second wife, Harriett Ellen Smith, whom he married in 1875, Page had four children—Katherine, John, Henrietta, and Margaret.

== Sources ==
=== Books ===
- Capace, Nancy (2000). Encyclopedia of Vermont. Santa Barbara, CA: Somerset Publishers. ISBN 978-0-4030-9602-2 – via Google Books.
- Carleton, Hiram (1903). Genealogical and Family History of the State of Vermont. Vol. I. New York, NY: Lewis Publishing Company – via Internet Archive.
- Smith, Henry Perry (1886). History of Rutland County, Vermont. Syracuse, NY: D. Mason & Co. – via Internet Archive.

=== Newspapers ===
- "Returns of the Election: Representatives". Middlebury Register. Middlebury, VT. September 8, 1852 – via Newspapers.com.
- "District Convention". Rutland Herald. Rutland, VT. September 5, 1856 – via Newspapers.com.
- "The Verdict at Rutland". Argus and Patriot. Montpelier, VT. May 20, 1885 – via Newspapers.com.
- "Gov. Page's Funeral". Rutland Herald. Rutland, VT. October 28, 1885 – via Newspapers.com.
- "The Mountain Rule in Vermont" (PDF). The New York Times. New York, NY. February 12, 1895 – via Wayback Machine.

=== Magazines ===
- Hand, Samuel B. (Summer–Fall 2003). "Mountain Rule Revisited" (PDF). Vermont History. Montpelier, VT: Vermont Historical Society.

Party political offices
Preceded by Henry M. Bates	Republican nominee for Vermont State Treasurer; 1860, 1861, 1862, 1863, 1864, 1865	Succeeded by John A. Page
Preceded by Paul Dillingham	Republican nominee for Governor of Vermont; 1867, 1868	Succeeded by Peter T. Washburn
Political offices
Preceded by Henry M. Bates	Treasurer of Vermont; 1860–1866	Succeeded by John A. Page
Preceded by Paul Dillingham	Governor of Vermont; 1867–1869	Succeeded by Peter T. Washburn
