= William H. Dubois =

American businessman and politician (1835–1907)

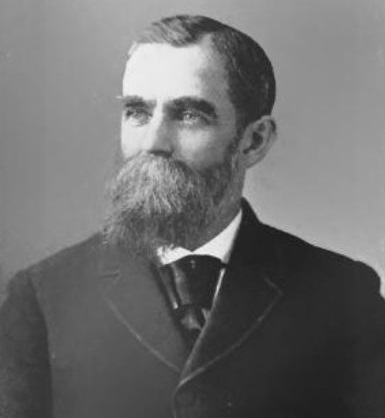
- From 1894's Men of Vermont Illustrated

14th Vermont State Treasurer
- In office October, 1882 – October 1890
- Governor: John L. Barstow; Samuel E. Pingree; Ebenezer J. Ormsbee; William P. Dillingham
- Preceded by: John A. Page
- Succeeded by: Henry F. Field

Member of the Vermont Senate from Orange County
- In office 1892–1894 Serving with John H. Watson
- Preceded by: Erastus C. Camp, Roney M. Harvey
- Succeeded by: Horace W. Bailey, Joseph K. Darling

Member of the Vermont House of Representatives from Randolph
- In office 1876–1878
- Preceded by: Bailey F. Adams
- Succeeded by: John Buswell

Personal details
- Born: William Henry Dubois; March 24, 1835 Randolph, Vermont, US
- Died: May 14, 1907 (aged 72) Randolph, Vermont, US
- Resting place: South View Cemetery, Randolph, Vermont
- Party: Republican
- Spouses: Anne Eliza Gilbert (m. 1862; died 1887) Adaline Moulton (m. 1888)
- Children: 9
- Education: West Randolph Academy, Randolph, Vermont
- Occupation: Banker; Insurance broker

William Henry Dubois (March 24, 1835 – May 14, 1907) was a Vermont businessman and political figure who served for eight years as Vermont State Treasurer.

== Early life ==
William Henry Dubois was born in Randolph, Vermont, on Match 24, 1835, the son of Earl C. and Anna (née Lamson) Dubois. He attended the schools of Randolph and the West Randolph Academy, and began to train for a business career by working in his brother's store.

== Start of career ==
At age 18, Dubois moved to Boston, Massachusetts, to become the bookkeeper in the wholesale footwear business of his uncle, Wales Tucker. A year or two later, Dubois became a partner in the Boston wholesale footwear firm of James Tucker & Co., where he remained until 1864.

Dubois was in ill health from overwork when he left Boston. After two years recuperating in Randolph, he moved to New York City to become a partner in a new shoe and boot wholesaler, Dubois, Magovern & Co. He remained with this firm until 1872, when he returned to Randolph.

== Later career ==
Dubois was involved in several local businesses and civic causes. He was active in West Randolph's First Baptist Church. He was a founder of the Bank of Randolph (later Randolph National Bank), and was appointed its president. He was a founder of the West Randolph Graded School, served on its board of directors, and was the school's treasurer. When West Randolph was incorporated as a village in 1876, Dubois was elected treasurer, and he served in this position until shortly before his death. In addition, he served on the villages's board of water commissioners, and was one of the auditors for the town of Randolph.

Dubois later became active in the insurance business, and was also involved in railroads, including serving on the board of directors for the Central Vermont Railway.

== Political career ==
A Republican, in 1876 Dubois represented Randolph in the Vermont House of Representatives. That same year he was appointed state inspector of finance by Governor Horace Fairbanks, responsible for reviewing the accounts and records of the state treasurer and auditor and providing an annual report to the governor and the Vermont General Assembly. Dubois served in this position for six years.

In 1882 Dubois ran successfully for state treasurer, and he served until 1890. After leaving the treasurer's post, Dubois was again appointed inspector of finance, and he served until 1894. In 1892 he ran successfully for the Vermont Senate, and he represented Orange County for one term. In addition, he served on the state board of library commissioners in the early 1900s.

== Death and burial ==
Dubois died in Randolph on May 14, 1907. He was buried at South View Cemetery in Randolph.

== Family ==
In 1862 Dubois married Anne Eliza Gilbert of Brandon, Vermont. They were the parents of nine children, of whom five lived to adulthood: Mary, Charles, Clara, Anne and John.

His first wife died in 1887, and in 1888 Dubois married Adaline Moulton of Randolph.

Party political offices
Preceded by John A. Page	Republican nominee for Vermont State Treasurer; 1882, 1884, 1886, 1888	Succeeded by Henry F. Field
Political offices
Preceded by John A. Page	Vermont State Treasurer; 1882–1890	Succeeded by Henry F. Field
