= Politics of Vermont =

Politics of a U.S. state

The politics of Vermont encompass the acts of the elected legislative bodies of the US state, the actions of its governors, as overseen by the Vermont courts, and the acts of the political parties that vie for elective power within the state. The state's politics include local Democratic and Republican political parties, as well as several smaller parties.

Vermont's constitution, which was drafted in 1777 when Vermont became an independent republic, reflects the concerns of a sovereign state; it prohibited adult slavery except in certain limited circumstances and provided for universal male suffrage and public schools. These provisions were carried over to the state Constitution when Vermont joined the Union in 1791. Vermont has been a pioneer in legislation pertaining to land use, gay rights, and school funding. Between 1854 and 1962, the state always voted Republican for Governor, thereafter, the governor's office alternated between the Democratic and Republican parties. The legislature has been primarily Democratic since the mid-1980s.

In 1854, the Vermont delegation, consisting of three congressmen and two senators, vigorously, but unsuccessfully opposed the repeal of the Missouri Compromise in the U.S. Congress. The replacement act appeared to extend slavery.

From the founding of the Republican Party in the 1850s until the 1960s, only Republicans won general elections for Vermont's statewide offices. One method that made this possible was imposition of the "Mountain Rule." Under the provisions of the Mountain Rule, one U.S. Senator was a resident of the east side of the Green Mountains and one resided on the west side, and the governorship and lieutenant governorship alternated between residents of the east and west side. Nominees for Governor and Lieutenant Governor were allowed two one-year terms and, later, one two-year term. For nearly 100 years, likely Republican candidates for office in Vermont agreed to abide by the Mountain Rule in the interests of party unity. Several factors led to the eventual weakening of the Mountain Rule, including: the long time political dispute between the Proctor (conservative) and Aiken–Gibson (liberal) wings of the party; primaries rather than conventions to select nominees; the direct election of U.S. Senators; and several active third parties, including the Progressives, the Prohibition Party, and the Local Option movement. In the 1960s, the rise of the Vermont Democratic Party and the construction of Interstate 89 also contributed to the end of the Mountain Rule. Though I-89 is a north–south route, it traverses Vermont from east to west and changed the way Vermonters viewed how the state was divided.

== History ==
=== Pre-Civil War ===
In 1798, the Federalist controlled Vermont General Assembly declined to reelect Democratic-Republican Party judicial officials, including Chief Justice Israel Smith, which was later referred to as the Vergennes Slaughter. The Democratic-Republicans gained control over the governorship for the first time following Smith's victory in the 1807 election. However, opposition to the Embargo Act of 1807 resulted in the Federalists regaining control over the governorship and three of Vermont's four seats in the United States House of Representatives in 1808, although the Democratic-Republicans retained control over the state legislature.

In 1810, a new county was created by the legislature and was named after Thomas Jefferson by the Democratic-Republican controlled legislature, but renamed after George Washington by the Federalists in 1814.

Federalist U.S. Representative Martin Chittenden was the only member of Vermont's congressional delegation to oppose the United States declaration of war on the United Kingdom starting the War of 1812. Chittenden defeated Jonas Galusha in the 1813 gubernatorial election as the legislature voted 112–111 to select him as governor despite losing the popular vote. Chittenden attempted to withdraw the third brigade of Vermont's militia from the war on November 10, 1813, but it refused to follow his commands.

Chittenden won a plurality in the 1814 gubernatorial election and was selected by the legislature. The congressional election laws of Vermont was altered by the Democratic-Republicans in 1812 to be statewide in the hope that it would increase their amount of seats, but the Federalists won all six seats in 1814, and Isaac Tichenor was appointed to the United States Senate. The Federalists removed Chief Justice Royall Tyler from the supreme court and replaced him with Nathaniel Chipman.

The Vermont Federalists declined to participate in the Hartford Convention. The Federalists lost the governorship and legislature in 1815, and ran their last gubernatorial candidate in the 1817 election.

Vermont supported John Quincy Adams during the 1824 and 1828 presidential elections, with Andrew Jackson failing to win any counties in the 1828 election. The Anti-Masonic Party gained the governorship in the 1831 election and its presidential candidate William Wirt won Vermont in the 1832 election.

None of the candidates in the 1835 gubernatorial election received a majority of the popular vote and the legislature was unable to select a winner after thirty-five ballots. Lieutenant Governor Silas H. Jennison was instead selected to serve as acting governor. A constitutional amendment was passed in 1836, which abolished the Governor's Council and established the Vermont Senate.

Eight of the gubernatorial elections between 1836 and 1853 were decided by the legislature. From 1835 to 1855, the Whig Party won every gubernatorial election except for the Democratic victory in the 1853 election. The legislature elected Democratic nominee John S. Robinson was elected in 1853 after 20 ballots and a speaker after 31 ballots, but was unable to select an U.S. Senator.

The prohibition of alcohol was instituted through a referendum in 1852.

==== Slavery ====
The legislature voiced its opposition to the Missouri Compromise in 1818, stating that "the right to introduce and establish slavery in a free government does not exist". The legislature passed a resolution in opposition of the annexation of Texas. Vermont's entire congressional delegation voted against the Kansas–Nebraska Act.

The Vermont Whigs adopted anti-slavery positions in 1842 to prevent themselves from losing more votes to the Liberty Party. William Slade, one of the leaders of the anti-slavery faction, was elected to the governorship in 1844. Slade left the Whigs in protest of the presidential nomination of Zachary Taylor, a slave-owner, and joined the Free Soil Party.

=== Post-Civil War ===
The Vermont Republican Party was founded in 1854, and dominated politics in Vermont until the mid-20th century. An informal governing rule, the mountain rule, resulted in offices being shared between residents of eastern and western Vermont.

Term limits for statewide offices and the legislature were increased from one year to two years by a constitutional convention in 1870, and this convention also abolished the Council of Censors, who were responsible for amending the constitution, giving its powers to the legislature. The constitution was amended in 1913 to alter election dates to November.

U.S. Representative Luke P. Poland chaired the committee that investigated the Crédit Mobilier scandal. U.S. Senator George F. Edmunds proposed the creation of the Electoral Commission to mediate the results of the 1876 presidential election.

Redfield Proctor, the founder of the Vermont Marble Company, established his family's control over Vermont politics. Four members of the Proctor family served as governor (Redfield, Fletcher D. Proctor, Redfield Proctor Jr., and Mortimer R. Proctor) and members of the family's company were active in state politics. Allen M. Fletcher, a relative of the Proctor family, also served as governor. The Proctor family's power ended with the defeat of Mortimer by Ernest W. Gibson Jr. in the 1946 Republican gubernatorial primary. The family later sold their company to a Swiss organization.

A primary system was created by the legislature in 1915, ending the previous method of selecting candidates through convention votes. Percival W. Clement unsuccessfully ran for governor in 1902 and 1906 Vermont gubernatorial election under the convention system, but won the Republican primary and general election in 1918.

Edna Beard became the first woman to serve in the legislature with her election in 1920. John E. Weeks was the first governor to win reelection following the 1870 amendments to the constitution with his victory in the 1928 election.

The State Board of Health was organized in 1886. A gasoline tax was introduced in 1923, and an income tax was passed in 1931, to pay for the creation of a state highway system. The Vermont State Guard was created in 1941.

=== Modern ===
The population of Vermont grew slowly during the first half of the 20th century, but grew rapidly in the 1960s and 1970s. The 1970 census reported that one-fourth of the state's population was born outside of it. The U.S. Supreme Court case Reynolds v. Sims forced Vermont to alter its districting in 1965, which benefitted the Democrats.

William H. Meyer's election to the U.S. House of Representatives in the 1958 election was the first time that a Democrat won a statewide election in Vermont since 1853. Democratic nominee Philip H. Hoff won the 1962 gubernatorial election, the first defeat for the Republican in the gubernatorial race, with the support of the Independent Party, an organization formed by dissident Republicans. Lyndon B. Johnson's victory in the 1964 election made him the first Democrat to win the state in a presidential election. The Democrats also won the positions of lieutenant governor, secretary of state, attorney general, treasurer, and auditor in 1964. Timothy J. O'Connor was selected as Speaker of the House in 1975, and the Democrats gained a majority in the state house in 1976, and state senate in 1984.

Hoff was the first Democratic governor to endorse an opponent to Johnson, Robert F. Kennedy, during the 1968 Democratic presidential primaries. A primary system was instituted for the presidential selection in 1976.

A 3% sales tax was introduced under Governor Deane C. Davis in 1969 to pay for welfare programs.

Consuelo N. Bailey's election in 1954 made her the first woman to serve in as lieutenant governor in the United States. Madeleine Kunin's victory in the 1984 election made her Vermont's first female governor.

The 1986 gubernatorial election was the first time since 1912 that none of the candidates received a majority of the vote.

Bernie Sanders' election to the U.S. House of Representatives in the 1990 election made him the first independent elected to statewide office in Vermont.

In 1985, the Vermont legislature passed and in 1986 voters narrowly defeated an equal rights amendment to the Vermont constitution. However, in 2007 Governor Jim Douglas signed a landmark civil rights bill banning discrimination on the basis of gender identity by employers, financial institutions, housing, public accommodations, and other contexts, after it had passed both chambers of the legislature by a veto-proof majority. Douglas previously had vetoed a similar bill in 2006.

Upon his entry into office with the death of his predecessor, Republican Richard A. Snelling in 1991, Governor Howard Dean faced a national economic recession and a $60 million state budget deficit. Facing some opposition in his own Democratic Party, he advocated for and received from the legislature a balanced budget. This set a precedent of fiscal restraint, which has continued in Vermont through 2011. In 1999, five moderate Democratic legislators, called "Blue Dogs", joined with Republicans to pass Democratic, but fiscally conservative, governor Howard Dean's plans for an income tax cut.

In 2009 Governor Douglas vetoed a bill allowing marriage for same sex couples in Vermont. The Vermont House and Senate overrode the veto the next day. Also 2009, Governor Douglas vetoed a budget bill—a first in Vermont history. The Democratically controlled legislature returned to special session and overturned the veto.

=== Rise and fall of Republican Party dominance ===
From the founding of the Republican party in the mid-1850s until the 1958 election of William H. Meyer to the United States House of Representatives, Vermont elected only Republicans to statewide office. For over a century, Vermont was the most reliably Republican state in the nation. From the party's founding in 1854 until the mid-20th century, Republicans dominated Vermont's political landscape at every level. However, a combination of demographic, economic, and political changes led to a dramatic reversal in the 1960s, transforming Vermont into one of the most progressive and Democratic-leaning states in the country.

The Vermont Republican Party was founded in 1854, absorbing the remnants of the Whig Party and quickly establishing itself as the dominant political force in the state. From 1854 to 1958, Republicans won every statewide election and every presidential contest in Vermont, making it the only state never to vote for a Democratic presidential candidate during this period. The party's dominance was so complete that the Vermont legislature and most local offices were almost exclusively Republican, with Democrats and other parties rarely posing a serious challenge. A key to Republican control was the “Mountain Rule,” an informal agreement that alternated gubernatorial and U.S. Senate nominations between residents of eastern and western Vermont, with strict term limits. This arrangement ensured party unity, minimized factionalism, and kept powerful families—most notably the Proctors—at the center of Vermont politics. At a deeper level, Vermont's Republicanism was rooted in the state's rural, Protestant, and Yankee traditions. The party was seen as a guardian of order, thrift, and moral rectitude, and its dominance was rarely questioned. The rival Democrats were increasingly based among urban Catholics--Irish and French--who were industrial workers favoring labor unions.

=== Democratic dominance (1962–present) ===
The demographics of the state changed. In 1960, 25% of the population was born outside the state. Most of these immigrants were from Democratic states and brought their voting inclinations with them. Anticipating this change, the Republicans conducted a massive free-for-all in 1958, the last good chance many of them saw to capture a congressional seat. They were wrong. Democrat William H. Meyer won, the first from his party in 102 years. In 1962, Philip Hoff was elected Governor, the first Democrat since before the Civil War. As of 2023, Democrats held supermajorities in both chambers of the Vermont General Assembly, and had controlled both chambers since 2005. Moderate Republican governor, Phil Scott, was re-elected in 2022 with 70% of the vote, despite the strong Democratic showing in other offices.

== Constitution ==
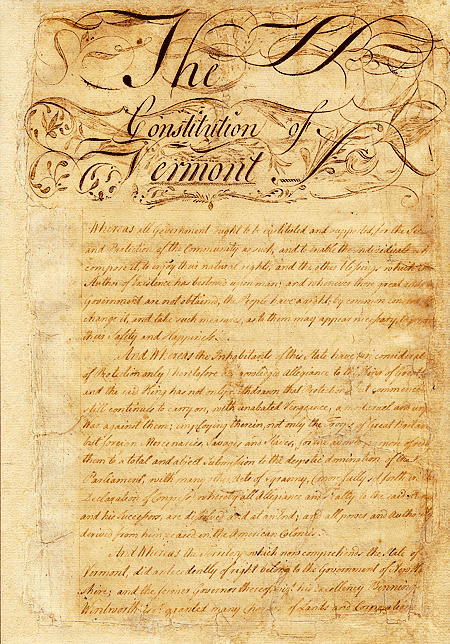
Vellum manuscript of the Constitution of Vermont, 1777 – this constitution was amended in 1786 and replaced in 1793 following Vermont's admission to the federal union in 1791

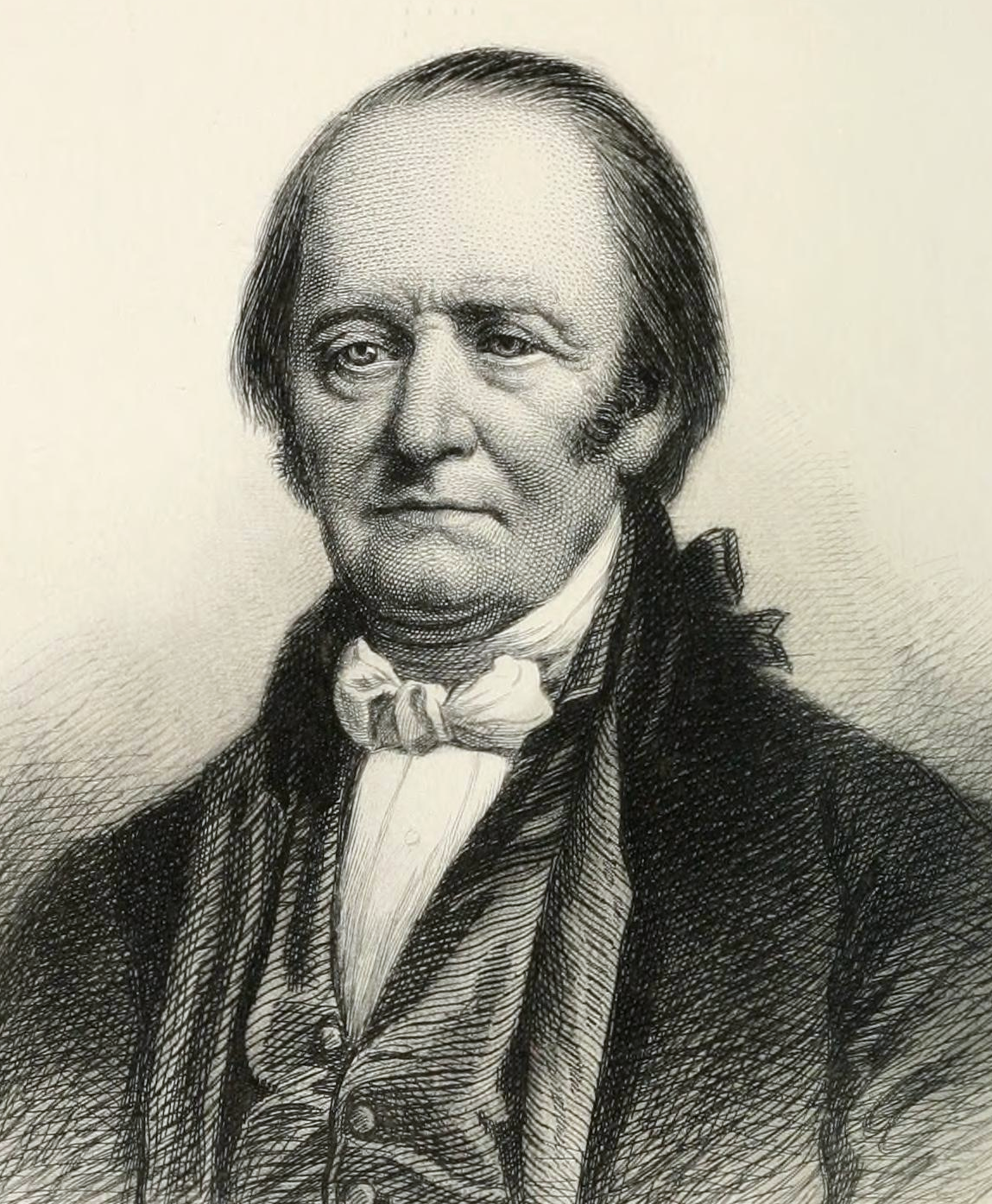
Engraving of Thomas Chittenden (presumed likeness) – first and third governor of the Vermont Republic and first governor of the State of Vermont (March 4, 1791 – August 25, 1797)

Vermont is one of four states that once was an independent nation, as the Republic of Vermont. The other states that used to be independent are Texas as the Republic of Texas, California as the California Republic, and Hawaii as the Kingdom and later Republic of Hawaii.

The Constitution of Vermont is organized into two sections, one declaring the rights of inhabitants and the other defining the governing power. In 21 articles, the rights of the inhabitants enumerated by the Vermont constitution address, among other things, the prohibition of slavery, compensation for use of property, freedom of worship, "free and pure" elections, freedoms regarding search and seizure, freedom of speech and press, trial by jury, the right to bear arms, and the right to assemble. In 76 sections the governing powers enumerated by the Vermont constitution address, among other things, the composition of the legislative, executive, and judicial bodies and their powers, the conduct of elections, and general administrative powers of government.

=== Notable constitutional provisions ===
The Vermont constitution and the courts support the right of a person to walk (fish and hunt) on any unposted, unfenced, land. That is, trespass must be proven by the owner; it is not automatically presumed.

Vermont is the only state in the union without a balanced budget requirement. Nevertheless, from 1991 and as of 2011, it had balanced its budget.

== Legislation by statute ==
Vermont legislators sometimes have addressed the character of the state and the rights of Vermonters with landmark legislation, organized here according to the pertinent title in the Vermont Statutes Annotated, which is the official codification of the laws enacted by the General Assembly.

=== Alcoholic beverages—Title 7 ===
Vermont is an alcoholic beverage control state. Alcoholic beverages may be sold in local grocery stores unless the town in which the store located has voted "dry" at their town meeting. Only state-licensed establishments may sell stronger alcoholic beverages in bottles. The number of these stores is limited. Prices are set by the state. The state directly controls the licensing of establishments that sell alcoholic beverages by the drink. In 2007, through the Vermont Department of Liquor Control, the state took in more than $14 million from the sale and distribution of liquor. There are 75 State Liquor Stores and 1,350 taverns in the state.

=== Conservation and development—Title 10 ===
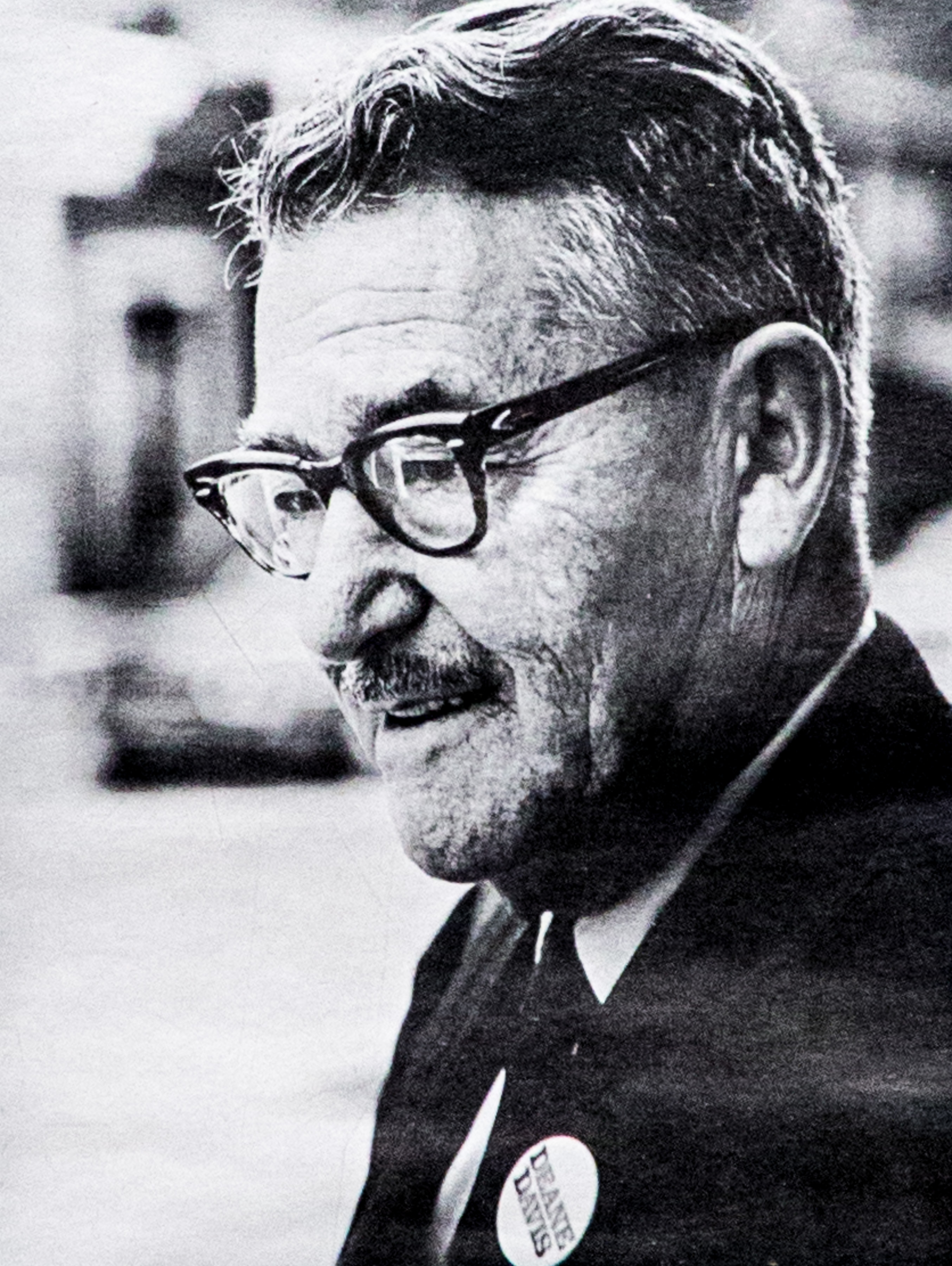
Governor Deane C. Davis (January 9, 1969 – January 4, 1973) – signed into law Vermont's Act 250 development legislation

After passage of the billboard-regulating Highway Beautification Act of 1965, Vermont moved to ban off-site billboards in 1968. All roadside billboards were gone from Vermont by 1974. Vermont is one of four states, along with Alaska, Hawaii, and Maine, to have prohibited by law all billboards from view of highway rights-of-way, except for signs on the contiguous property of the business location.

After the legislature was redistricted under one-person, one-vote, it passed legislation to accommodate American emigrants from New York, which earlier legislatures had ignored. The new legislation was the Land Use and Development Law (Act 250) in 1970. The law, which was the first of its kind in the nation, created nine district environmental commissions consisting of private citizens, appointed by the governor, who must approve land development and subdivision plans that would have a significant impact on the state's environment and many small communities. As a result of Act 250, Vermont was the last state to get a Wal-Mart. As a result of Act 250, there is only one trash disposal site in the state, located in Coventry near Lake Memphremagog.

Act 148 effectively requires the towns to recycle glass and plastic in 2015, and food waste by 2020. Landfills will no longer accept these wastes after those dates.

=== Crimes and criminal procedure—Title 13 ===
After executing 26 people, Vermont put its last convict to death in 1954. The first 21 were executed by hanging, the last five by the electric chair. Vermont abolished the death penalty in 1965. As of 2015, Vermont is one of eight states along with Alaska, Arizona, Arkansas, Kansas, Maine, West Virginia, and Wyoming in the Union to allow any adult to carry a concealed firearm without any sort of permit. There is no statute barring public nudity in Vermont unless it constitutes "open and gross lewdness and lascivious behavior", however local ordinances may bar disrobing in public. In 2010, the state enacted a law requiring that a DNA sample be taken from everyone arraigned on a felony, which is entered into a database controlled by the FBI. The age of consent in Vermont is 16.

=== Domestic relations—Title 15 ===
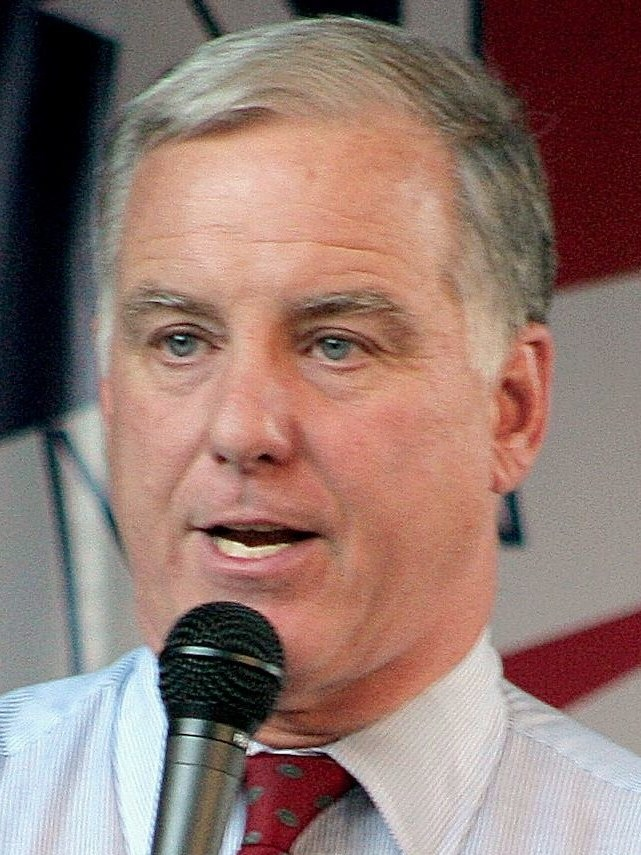
Governor Howard Dean (August 14, 1991 – January 9, 2003) – signed into law the Vermont civil unions and educational funding laws

In Baker v. Vermont (1999), the Vermont Supreme Court ruled that, under the Constitution of Vermont, the state must either allow same-sex marriage or provide a separate but equal institution for same-sex couples. The state legislature chose the second option by creating the institution of civil union. The 2000 bill was passed by the legislature and signed into law by Governor Howard Dean. It granted same-sex couples nearly all the rights and privileges of marriage. Passage of this law engendered a backlash against this and other perceived changes to Vermont culture, which became manifest in the Take Back Vermont movement in the same year.

In 2009 however, the state legislature passed a same-sex marriage bill that was vetoed by Governor Jim Douglas. The legislature overrode the veto, making Vermont the first state to recognize same-sex marriage as the result of a bill passed in the legislature and not due to a judicial ruling.

=== Education—Title 16 ===
Vermont's Act 60, known as "The Equal Educational Opportunity Act", was a law enacted in June 1997 by the Vermont legislature to achieve a fair balance of educational spending across school districts, independent of the degree of prosperity within each district. The law was in response to a Vermont Supreme Court decision in the Brigham vs. State of Vermont case, wherein the court ruled that Vermont's then existing educational funding system was unconstitutional, because it allowed students in towns with higher total property values to receive a higher level of education funding per pupil than students in towns with lower property values. For most towns the "equalized yield" for any local taxes above the statewide level decreased property taxes and increased the funds available for their schools, however, certain ski towns that had been spending much more per pupil than most districts, experienced the opposite result. Among them was the town of Killington, which voted 3:1 to secede from Vermont and join New Hampshire due to what the locals say is an unfair tax burden. "Gold Towns", such as Killington, generally were satisfied with the resolution in 2003 contained in Act 68, which continued "equalized yield", but gave those towns latitude to spend more at home.

=== Elections—Title 17 ===
The state is one of three in the nation that does not require political candidates to disclose personal financial information. Vermont is one of two states who allow prison inmates to vote, the other being Maine.

=== Health—Title 18 ===
As a result of statutory benefits such as Dr. Dynasaur, Vermont, with 9.5% of the population with no health insurance, has the second best coverage in the country, as of 2004.

In 2007, the governor signed the "Prescription Confidentiality Law", required that records containing a doctor's prescribing practices not be sold or used for marketing purposes unless the doctor consented. This statute was struck down in 2011 by the U.S. Supreme Court in Sorrell v. IMS Health, Inc. as a violation of the First Amendment.

In 2009, Vermont passed the strictest law in the nation controlling the marketing of pharmaceutical drugs to doctors, hospitals and other health providers. In the same year, the state outlawed smoking at workplaces.

In May 2013, Vermont passed Act 39 (a.k.a. the Patient Choice and Control at End of Life Act), becoming the first state to allow assisted suicide for terminally ill patients under certain conditions. On June 6, 2013, Vermont became the 17th state to decriminalize marijuana. The statute makes possession of less than an ounce of the drug punishable by a small fine rather than arrest and possible jail time.

By 2018, the state had set a maximum level, for PFAs, of 20 parts per trillion in drinking water total for all of the PFA chemicals. In 2019, it had the strictest standard in the nation for PFOAs. The state presumes that groundwater is a state resource, and that all water found anywhere on the surface is potable (drinkable). Leachate into the Clyde River from the single dump in Vermont, in Coventry, was reported "safe" by government authorities in 2018.

=== Fire Districts - Title 20 ===
As of 2017, the establishment of fire districts included fire departments. However they were most often used to establish water systems. They may also be used to establish community sewer systems, sidewalks, and street lighting.

=== Motor Vehicles—Title 23 ===
In Vermont a driver may regard double yellow lines as "advisory," meaning that they merely are a warning not to cross over them. A motorist will not be ticketed for that as an offense by itself.

=== Municipal and County Government—Title 24 ===
Having tried to discourage suburban sprawl, the legislatures of 1998 and 2002 moved to encourage downtowns. In 2008, there were 23 designated downtowns and 78 village centers.

The state has an "open meeting" law. This requires special attention when a quorum of an elected government group is meeting anyplace, including socially.

=== Public Records Act ===
The Vermont Public Records Law states that “any agency, board, department, commission, committee, branch, instrumentality, or authority of the state or any agency, board, committee, department, branch, instrumentality, commission, or authority of any political subdivision of the state" is obligated to provide access to public records for inspection and copying unless the records are exempt by law from public access. Exemptions might include records that have been determined to be confidential by law, records that by law may only be disclosed to certain people, etc. Public records are defined as "any written or recorded information, regardless of physical form or characteristics, which is produced or acquired in the course of public agency business".

A line from the law that was especially stood out was that “[o]fficers of government are trustees and servants of the people and it is in the public interest to enable any person to review and criticize their decisions even though such examination may cause inconvenience or embarrassment”. It goes on to say that everyone has a right to privacy, especially in economic and personal pursuits, and it should be kept private unless there is a specific need of the record to scrutinize the decisions of a government official.

One can go to any public agency and inspect or make copies of any public record (beyond exemptions) during normal business hours of that agency. If access is denied by the agency, one can appeal. In that case, the agency head must respond within 5 business days to the appeal and must “include the asserted statutory basis for denial and a brief statement of the reasons and supporting facts for denial”. If the denial is reversed, the agency must make the records available to the person requesting immediately.

The format for a records request can vary in VT. (“Unless otherwise allowed by law, agencies must accept records requests in any manner or format presented by a member of the public”.) The exceptions to this are if the request will take more than 30 minutes to fulfill or the requester is asking for it to be transmitted in a nontraditional format. In those cases, the agency might ask for the request in writing. Costs associated with the requests might be costs of copying, costs of mailing the request, or, if the request will take longer than 30 minutes to complete, the agency might ask for the cost of staff time. (The Secretary of State and Secretary of Administration will be the ones to determine the actual cost of staff time in that instance.) Agencies will provide an estimate of costs to requester.

== Federal elections ==
United States presidential election results for Vermont
Year	Republican / Whig		Democratic		Third party(ies)	
Year	No.	%	No.	%	No.	%
1836	20,994	59.93%	14,037	40.07%	0	0.00%
1840	32,445	63.90%	18,009	35.47%	319	0.63%
1844	26,780	54.84%	18,049	36.96%	4,000	8.19%
1848	23,132	48.27%	10,948	22.85%	13,842	28.88%
1852	22,173	50.52%	13,044	29.72%	8,673	19.76%
1856	39,561	77.96%	10,577	20.84%	610	1.20%
1860	33,808	75.86%	8,649	19.41%	2,109	4.73%
1864	42,420	76.10%	13,322	23.90%	0	0.00%
1868	44,167	78.57%	12,045	21.43%	0	0.00%
1872	41,480	78.29%	10,926	20.62%	574	1.08%
1876	44,091	68.30%	20,254	31.38%	208	0.32%
1880	45,091	69.81%	18,182	28.15%	1,321	2.05%
1884	39,514	66.52%	17,331	29.18%	2,556	4.30%
1888	45,192	69.05%	16,788	25.65%	3,472	5.30%
1892	37,992	68.09%	16,325	29.26%	1,479	2.65%
1896	51,127	80.08%	10,640	16.66%	2,080	3.26%
1900	42,569	75.73%	12,849	22.86%	794	1.41%
1904	40,459	77.97%	9,777	18.84%	1,652	3.18%
1908	39,552	75.08%	11,496	21.82%	1,635	3.10%
1912	23,332	37.13%	15,354	24.43%	24,156	38.44%
1916	40,250	62.43%	22,708	35.22%	1,517	2.35%
1920	68,212	75.82%	20,919	23.25%	830	0.92%
1924	80,498	78.22%	16,124	15.67%	6,295	6.12%
1928	90,404	66.87%	44,440	32.87%	347	0.26%
1932	78,984	57.66%	56,266	41.08%	1,730	1.26%
1936	81,023	56.39%	62,124	43.24%	542	0.38%
1940	78,371	54.78%	64,269	44.92%	422	0.29%
1944	71,527	57.06%	53,820	42.93%	14	0.01%
1948	75,926	61.54%	45,557	36.92%	1,899	1.54%
1952	109,717	71.45%	43,355	28.23%	485	0.32%
1956	110,390	72.16%	42,549	27.81%	39	0.03%
1960	98,131	58.65%	69,186	41.35%	7	0.00%
1964	54,942	33.69%	108,127	66.30%	20	0.01%
1968	85,142	52.75%	70,255	43.53%	6,007	3.72%
1972	117,149	62.66%	68,174	36.47%	1,623	0.87%
1976	102,085	54.34%	81,044	43.14%	4,726	2.52%
1980	94,598	44.37%	81,891	38.41%	36,718	17.22%
1984	135,865	57.92%	95,730	40.81%	2,966	1.26%
1988	124,331	51.10%	115,775	47.58%	3,227	1.33%
1992	88,122	30.42%	133,592	46.11%	67,987	23.47%
1996	80,352	31.09%	137,894	53.35%	40,203	15.56%
2000	119,775	40.70%	149,022	50.63%	25,511	8.67%
2004	121,180	38.80%	184,067	58.94%	7,062	2.26%
2008	98,974	30.45%	219,262	67.46%	6,810	2.10%
2012	92,698	30.97%	199,239	66.57%	7,353	2.46%
2016	95,369	30.27%	178,573	56.68%	41,125	13.05%
2020	112,704	30.67%	242,820	66.09%	11,904	3.24%
2024	119,395	32.32%	235,791	63.83%	14,236	3.85%

Historically, Vermont was considered one of the most reliably Republican states in the country in terms of national elections. From 1856 to 1988, Vermont voted Democratic only once, in Lyndon B. Johnson's landslide victory of 1964 against Barry M. Goldwater. It was also one of only two states—the other being Maine—where Franklin D. Roosevelt was completely shut out in all four of his presidential bids. In the late 19th and early 20th centuries, Republican presidential candidates frequently won the state with over 70 percent of the vote.

In the 1980s and 1990s many people moved in from out of state. Much of this immigration included the arrival of more liberal political influences of the urban areas of New York and the rest of New England in Vermont. The brand of Republicanism in Vermont has historically been a moderate one, and combined with the newcomers from out of state, this made Vermont friendlier to Democrats as the national GOP moved to the right. As evidence of this, in 1990 Bernie Sanders, a self-described democratic socialist, was elected to Vermont's lone seat in the House as an independent. Sanders became the state's junior Senator in 2007. However, for his entire career in the House and Senate, Sanders has caucused with the Democrats and is counted as a Democrat for the purposes of committee assignments and voting for party leadership.

After narrowly supporting George H. W. Bush in 1988, it gave Democrat Bill Clinton a 16-point margin in 1992—the first time the state had gone Democratic since 1964. Vermont has voted Democratic in every presidential election since.

Since 2004, Vermont has been one of the Democrats' most loyal states. It gave John Kerry his fourth-largest margin of victory in the presidential campaign against George W. Bush; he won the state's popular vote by 20 percentage points, taking almost 59 percent of the vote. (Kerry, from neighboring Massachusetts, also became the first Northern Democrat ever to carry Vermont; Johnson was from Texas, Clinton from Arkansas and Al Gore, triumphant in the Green Mountain State in 2000, from Tennessee.) Essex County in the state's northeastern section was the only county to vote for Bush in both of his nationwide victories in 2000 and 2004. Vermont is the only state that did not receive a visit from George W. Bush during his tenure as President of the United States. Indeed, George W. Bush is the first Republican to win the White House without carrying Vermont; he lost it in 2004 as well. In 2008, Vermont gave Barack Obama his third-largest margin of victory (37 percentage points) and third-largest vote share in the nation by his winning the state 68% to 31%. Only Obama's birth state of Hawaii and Washington, D.C. were stronger Democratic victories. The same held true in 2012, when Obama carried Vermont 67% to 31%.

In 2016, Bernie Sanders (a former candidate for the Democratic nomination) received 5.68% of the vote as a write-in candidate, more than Gary Johnson's 3.14% and Jill Stein's 2.11% combined. Sanders received the highest write-in draft campaign percentage for a statewide presidential candidate in history. Along with that, with 30.27% of the vote, Donald Trump's performance is the weakest showing for a Republican in Vermont, setting a record low for the party since George H. W. Bush lost the state in 1992 with 30.4% of the vote. In the 2020, Vermont was the most Democratic state in the nation for the first time in the state's history.

Vermont's two Senators are Democrat Peter Welch and Independent Bernie Sanders. The state is represented by an at-large member of the House, Democrat Becca Balint.

== Court rulings ==
By a court decision from 1903, State vs Rosenthal, people have the right to carry firearms without a permit.

The Vermont Attorney General attempts to uphold bills that have passed into law, which included the 2007 "Prescription Confidentiality Law." Attempting to uphold that state statute, which was struck down by the U.S. Supreme Court in Sorrell v. IMS Health, Inc., cost the state $4,003,000.

In Randall v. Sorrell, the Supreme Court overturned the strictest campaign financing statute in the country. The state was obligated to pay the plaintiffs $1,395,000.

In 2012, the federal district court struck down the state's law giving it a say on whether Vermont Yankee nuclear plant stays open or not. The state appealed. In August 2013 Entergy announced the decommissioning of the plant in the fourth quarter of 2014. It cited economic factors, notably the low cost of electricity caused by cheap natural gas.

== Political parties ==
Vermont's political system has branches of the major national parties in the United States, as well as two local leftist parties.

=== Democratic Party ===
The Vermont Democratic Party is the affiliate of the Democratic Party in the U.S. state of Vermont.

Since the founding of the Republican Party until the 1960s, Vermont was almost exclusively a Republican state, with Republicans dominating Vermont politics, especially the governorship, from 1854 to 1960. But Democrats have since staged a resurgence in state politics, perhaps inspired by the election of John F. Kennedy as president in 1960.

It is now the dominant party in the state, controlling Vermont's at-large U.S. House seat, one of its U.S. Senate seats, and majorities in both houses of the state legislature. Vermont's other U.S. Senate seat is held by Bernie Sanders, an independent who caucuses with the Democratic Party. The only statewide offices the party does not control is the governorship, held by Republican Phil Scott, and the lieutenant governorship, held by Republican John S. Rodgers.

=== Republican Party ===
The Vermont Republican Party is the affiliate of the Republican Party in Vermont and has been active since its foundation in the 1860s. The party is the second largest in the state behind the Vermont Democratic Party, but ahead of the Vermont Progressive Party. The party historically dominated Vermont politics until the mid-20th century, but was replaced by the Vermont Democratic Party. The party currently has very weak federal electoral power in the state, controlling none of Vermont's federal elected offices. The two statewide offices that the party currently controls are the governorship, held by Phil Scott, and the lieutenant governorship, held by John S. Rodgers.

The Vermont Republican Party tends to hold more moderate views than other Republican Party state affiliates. This is because Vermont is widely regarded as one of the most liberal and progressive states in the nation. Vermont Republicans also tend to be more anti-Trumpist than Republicans in other states. Current Republican Governor Phil Scott voted for Democratic nominee Kamala Harris in the 2024 presidential election and Joe Biden in the 2020 presidential election calling both "a vote against Donald Trump" and a move to "put country over party" and acknowledged Biden's victory, repudiating false claims of election interference.

In the 2024 primaries, the Vermont primary was one of only two races that Donald Trump did not carry (the other being the District of Columbia primary).

=== Progressive Party ===
The Vermont Progressive Party, formerly the Progressive Coalition and Independent Coalition, is a political party in the United States that is active in Vermont. It is the third-largest political party in Vermont behind the Democratic and Republican parties. As of 2026, the party has one member in the Vermont Senate and three members in the Vermont House of Representatives, as well as several more affiliated legislators who caucus with the Democratic Party.

The first members aligned with the party were elected to the state legislature in 1990. Prior to this, the last time a third party had members elected to the state legislature in Vermont was in 1917, with the election of James Lawson of the Socialist Party of America.

=== Liberty Union ===
The Green Mountain Peace and Justice Party (GMPJP), formerly known as the Liberty Union Party (LUP) until 2021, is a socialist political party in Vermont, United States. LUP was formed in 1970 by progressives to contest the 1970 Senate election.

GMPJP is a self-proclaimed "non-violent socialist party". In 1995, LUP was described by The New York Times as the cradle of progressivism in Vermont.

GMPJP is the fourth-largest party in Vermont after the Democratic, Republican, and Progressive parties.

Notable past and present members include William H. Meyer, Peter Diamondstone, Bernie Sanders, Michael Parenti, and Mary Alice Herbert.

== See also ==
- Elections in Vermont
- Electoral reform in Vermont
- Government of Vermont
- List of politics by U.S. state or territory

== Works cited ==
- Doyle, William (1992). The Vermont Political Tradition: And Those Who Helped Make It. W. Doyle. ISBN 0961548614.
