= Sam Strong =

Sam Strong or Samuel Strong may refer to:

== People ==
- Sam Strong (director) (fl. 2010s), Australian theatre director
- Sam Strong (soccer) (born 1996), American soccer player
- Samuel Strong (Vermont politician) (1762–1832), Vermont politician and militia officer
- Samuel Henry Strong (1825–1909), Chief Justice of Canada and lawyer
- Sam Strong (Beneath the Trees Where Nobody Sees), fictional character in comic miniseries

== Places ==
- Gen. Samuel Strong House, located on West Main Street in Vergennes, Vermont
- Samuel Paddock Strong House, located on 94 West Main Street in Vergennes, Vermont
