= 1812 Vermont gubernatorial election =

- September 1, 1812
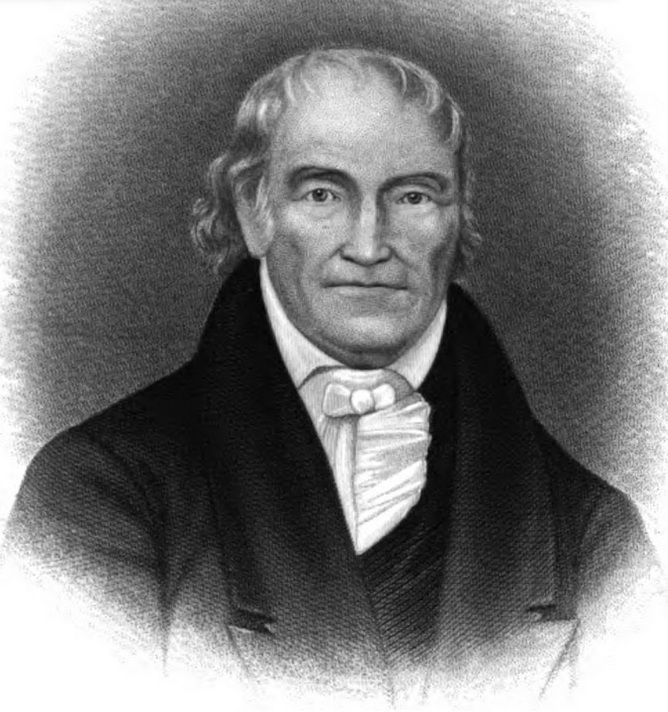

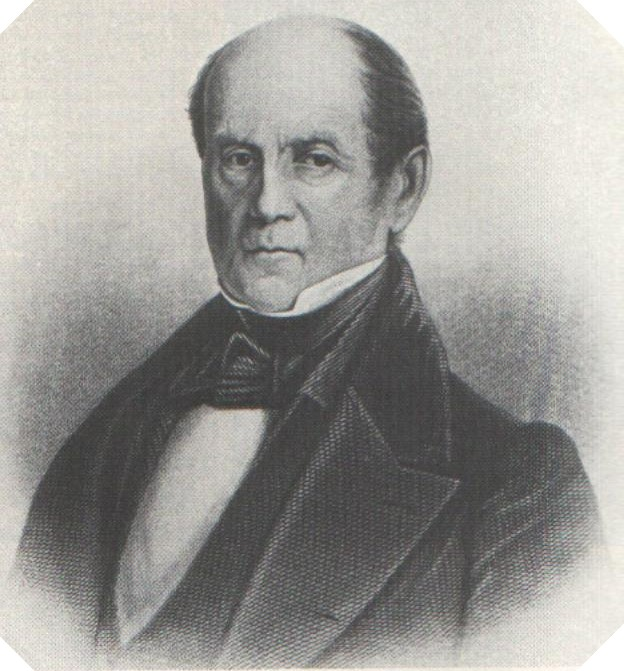
Nominee	Jonas Galusha	Martin Chittenden
Party	Democratic-Republican	Federalist
Popular vote	19,158	15,950
Percentage	53.59%	44.61%
- County results Galusha: 50–60% 60–70% Chittenden: 50–60% 60–70% Tie: 50% No Vote/Data
Governor before election
Jonas Galusha
Democratic-Republican
Elected Governor
Jonas Galusha
Democratic-Republican

The 1812 Vermont gubernatorial election took place on September 1, 1812. It resulted in the election of Jonas Galusha to a one-year term.

The Vermont General Assembly met in Montpelier on October 8. The Vermont House of Representatives appointed a committee to review the votes of the freemen of Vermont for governor, lieutenant governor, treasurer, and members of the governor's council. The committee's examination showed that Jonas Galusha defeated Martin Chittenden to win election to a fourth one-year term.

In the election for lieutenant governor, Paul Brigham defeated William Chamberlain to win his seventeenth one-year term. In this contest, one Vermont newspaper recorded the vote totals as: Brigham (Democratic-Republican), 17,887 (53.0%); Chamberlain (Federalist), 14,893 (44.2%); scattering, 952 (2.8%).

Benjamin Swan was elected to a one-year term as treasurer, his thirteenth, though the vote totals were not recorded. Swan, a Federalist was also endorsed by the Democratic-Republicans, and so was effectively unopposed for reelection.

In the race for governor, a contemporary newspaper article reported the results as follows.

== Results ==
1812 Vermont gubernatorial election
Party	Candidate	Votes	%
Democratic-Republican	Jonas Galusha (incumbent)	19,158	53.59
Federalist	Martin Chittenden	15,950	44.61
Write-in		644	1.80
Total votes		35,752	100.0
