= 1819 Vermont gubernatorial election =

- September 7, 1819
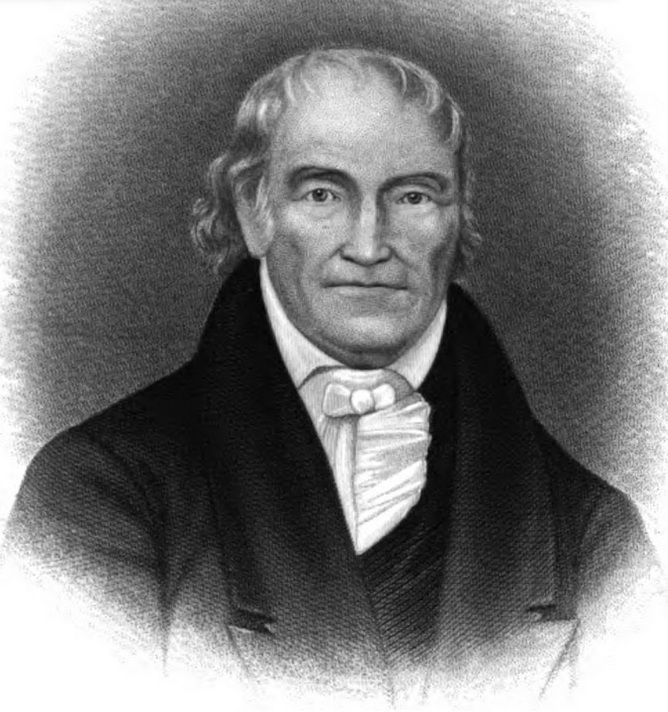

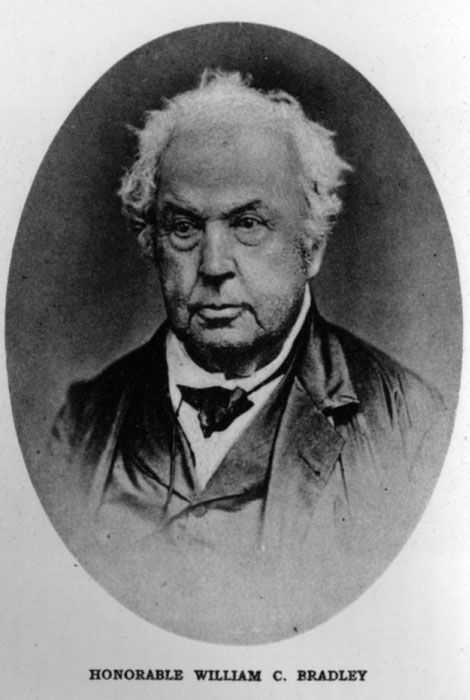
Nominee	Jonas Galusha	William Czar Bradley
Party	Democratic-Republican	Democratic-Republican
Popular vote	12,628	1,035
Percentage	81.97%	6.72%
- County results Galusha: 40–50% 50–60% 60–70% 70–80% 80–90% 90–100%
Governor before election
Jonas Galusha
Democratic-Republican
Elected Governor
Jonas Galusha
Democratic-Republican

The 1819 Vermont gubernatorial election took place on September 7, 1819. It resulted in the election of Jonas Galusha to a one-year term.

The Vermont General Assembly met in Montpelier on October 14. The Vermont House of Representatives appointed a committee to review the votes of the freemen of Vermont for governor, lieutenant governor, treasurer, and members of the governor's council. With the Federalist Party no longer a force in Vermont politics, the committee determined that incumbent Jonas Galusha had won a one-year term, defeating fellow Democratic-Republicans William Czar Bradley and Dudley Chase.

In the election for lieutenant governor, the legislature's canvassing committee determined that Paul Brigham had won election to a one-year term by defeating former lieutenant governor William Chamberlain and James D. Butler. According to a contemporary newspaper article, the vote totals were: Brigham 12,348 (85.0%); Chamberlain, 1,150 (7.9%); Butler, 265 (1.8%); scattering, 765 (5.3%).

Benjamin Swan was elected to a one-year term as treasurer, his twentieth. Nominally a Federalist, Swan was usually unopposed; in 1819 he received 11,652 votes, with no votes recorded for any other candidate.

In the race for governor, the results of the popular vote were reported as follows.

== Results ==
1819 Vermont gubernatorial election
Party	Candidate	Votes	%
Democratic-Republican	Jonas Galusha (incumbent)	12,628	81.97
Democratic-Republican	William Czar Bradley	1,035	6.72
Democratic-Republican	Dudley Chase	658	4.27
Write-in		1,085	7.04
Total votes		15,406	100.0
