= 1811 Vermont gubernatorial election =

- September 3, 1811
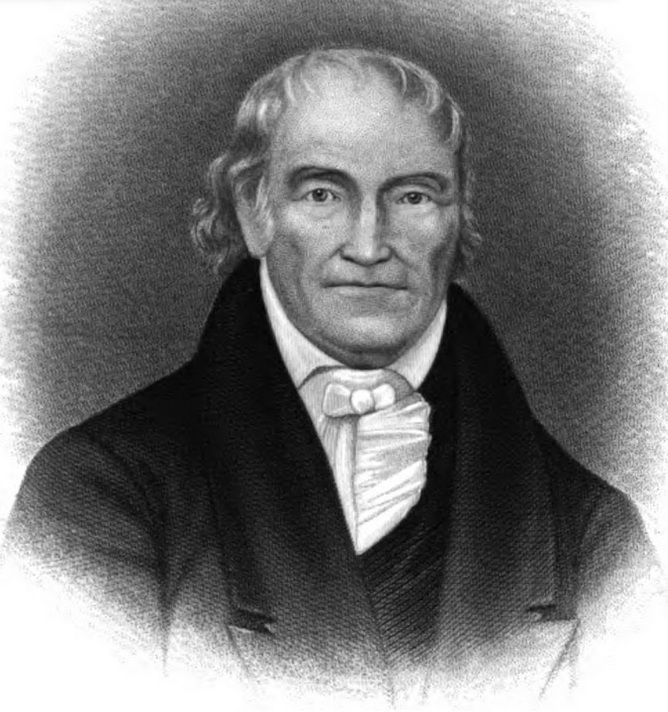

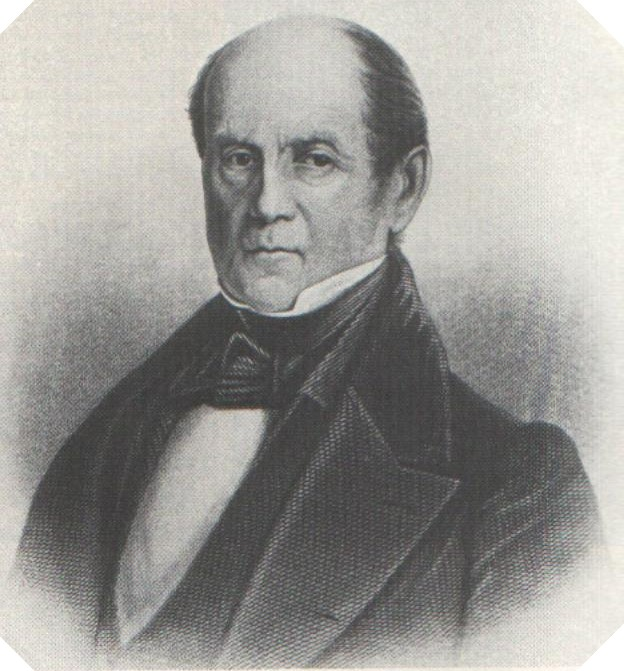
Nominee	Jonas Galusha	Martin Chittenden
Party	Democratic-Republican	Federalist
Popular vote	13,828	11,214
Percentage	55.22%	44.78%
- County results Galusha: 50–60% 60–70% Chittenden: 50–60% 60–70% No Data/Vote
Governor before election
Jonas Galusha
Democratic-Republican
Elected Governor
Jonas Galusha
Democratic-Republican

The 1811 Vermont gubernatorial election took place on September 3, 1811. It resulted in the election of Jonas Galusha to a one-year term.

The Vermont General Assembly met in Montpelier on October 10. The Vermont House of Representatives appointed a committee to review the votes of the freemen of Vermont for governor, lieutenant governor, treasurer, and members of the governor's council. The committee's examination showed that Jonas Galusha defeated Martin Chittenden to win election to a third one-year term.

In the election for lieutenant governor, Paul Brigham defeated William Chamberlain to win his sixteenth one-year term. In this contest, one Vermont newspaper recorded the vote totals as: Paul Brigham (Democratic-Republican), 11,896 (55.8%); William Chamberlain (Federalist), 9,415 (44.2%).

Benjamin Swan was elected to a one-year term as treasurer, his twelfth, though the vote totals were not recorded. According to contemporary newspaper articles, Swan, a Federalist was also endorsed by the Democratic-Republicans, and so was unopposed for reelection.

In the race for governor, a contemporary newspaper article reported the results as follows.

== Results ==
1811 Vermont gubernatorial election
Party	Candidate	Votes	%
Democratic-Republican	Jonas Galusha (incumbent)	13,828	55.22
Federalist	Martin Chittenden	11,214	44.78
Total votes		25,042	100.0
