= 1816 Vermont gubernatorial election =

- September 3, 1816
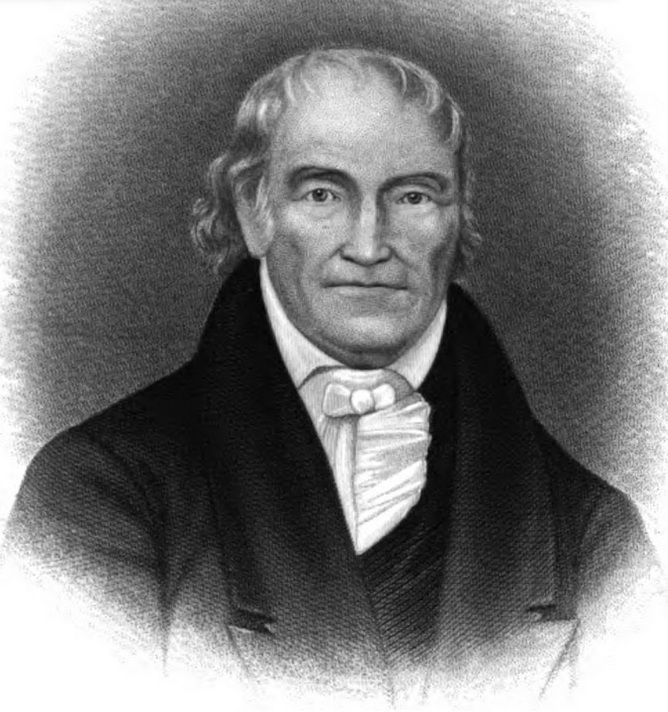

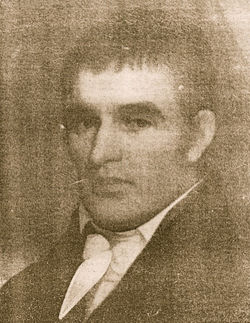
| Nominee | Jonas Galusha | Samuel Strong |
| Party | Democratic-Republican | Federalist |
| Popular vote | 17,262 | 13,888 |
| Percentage | 55.23% | 44.44% |
- County results Galusha: 50–60% 60–70% 70–80% Strong: 50–60% 60–70%
Governor before election
Jonas Galusha
Democratic-Republican
Elected Governor
Jonas Galusha
Democratic-Republican

The 1816 Vermont gubernatorial election took place on September 3, 1816. It resulted in the election of Jonas Galusha to a one-year term.

The Vermont General Assembly met in Montpelier on October 10. The Vermont House of Representatives appointed a committee to review the votes of the freemen of Vermont for governor, lieutenant governor, treasurer, and members of the governor's council. The committee determined that incumbent Jonas Galusha had defeated Samuel Strong, a major general of the state militia and a former member of the Vermont House to win a one-year term.

In the election for lieutenant governor, the legislature's canvassing committee determined that incumbent Paul Brigham had attained a majority over former lieutenant governor William Chamberlain to win election to a one-year term. According to a contemporary newspaper article, the vote totals were: Brigham, 17,124 (55.1%); Chamberlain 13,934 (44.9%).

Benjamin Swan was elected to a one-year term as treasurer, his seventeenth. Swan, a Federalist was also endorsed by the Democratic-Republicans, and so was effectively unopposed for reelection. According to a contemporary newspaper account, he received 27,248 votes (99.8%), with 44 (0.2%) scattering.

In the race for governor, the results of the popular vote were reported as follows.

== Results ==
1816 Vermont gubernatorial election
| Party | Candidate | Votes | % |
|---|---|---|---|
| Democratic-Republican | Jonas Galusha (incumbent) | 17,262 | 55.23 |
| Federalist | Samuel Strong | 13,888 | 44.44 |
| Write-in | | 102 | 0.33 |
| Total votes | | 31,252 | 100.0 |
