= Nathaniel Whiting =

Nathaniel Whiting may refer to:

- Nathaniel Whiting (mill owner) (1609–1682), American colonial settler of Dedham, Massachusetts
- Nathaniel N. Whiting (1792–1872), American Baptist preacher in New York

== See also ==
- Nathaniel White (disambiguation)
