= 1810 Vermont gubernatorial election =

- September 4, 1810
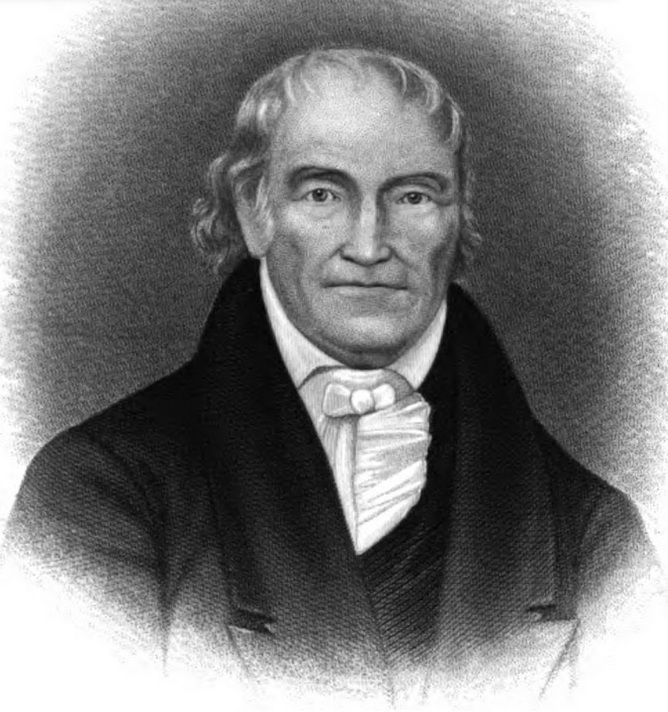

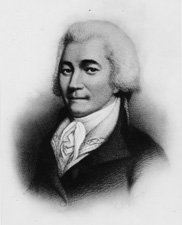
Nominee	Jonas Galusha	Isaac Tichenor
Party	Democratic-Republican	Federalist
Popular vote	13,814	9,910
Percentage	57.35%	41.15%
- County results Galusha: 50–60% 60–70% 70–80% Tichenor: 50–60% 60–70%
Governor before election
Jonas Galusha
Democratic-Republican
Elected Governor
Jonas Galusha
Democratic-Republican

The 1810 Vermont gubernatorial election took place on September 4, 1810. It resulted in the election of Jonas Galusha to a one-year term.

The Vermont General Assembly met in Montpelier on October 11. The Vermont House of Representatives appointed a committee to examine the votes of the freemen of Vermont for governor, lieutenant governor, treasurer, and members of the governor's council.

The committee's examination of the votes showed that Jonas Galusha defeated former Governor Isaac Tichenor to win election to a second one-year term. In the election for lieutenant governor, the voters selected Paul Brigham for a one-year term, his fifteenth. Benjamin Swan was elected to his eleventh one-year term as treasurer.

In the race for treasurer, the vote totals were not recorded. According to an October 1810 newspaper article, Swan was unopposed.

In the lieutenant governor's contest, one Vermont newspaper recorded the vote totals as: Paul Brigham (Democratic-Republican), 12,261 (62.6%); Lewis R. Morris (Federalist), 6,378 (32.6%); scattering, 938 (4.8%).

In the race for governor, a contemporary newspaper article reported the results as follows.

== Results ==
1810 Vermont gubernatorial election
Party	Candidate	Votes	%
Democratic-Republican	Jonas Galusha (incumbent)	13,814	57.35
Federalist	Isaac Tichenor	9,910	41.15
Write-in		361	1.50
Total votes		24,085	100.0
