= Governor Chittendon =

Governor Chittendon may refer to:

- Martin Chittenden (1763–1840), 7th Governor of Vermont, son of Thomas Chittenden.
- Thomas Chittenden (1730–1797), 1st Governor of Vermont
