= 1818 Vermont gubernatorial election =

- September 1, 1818
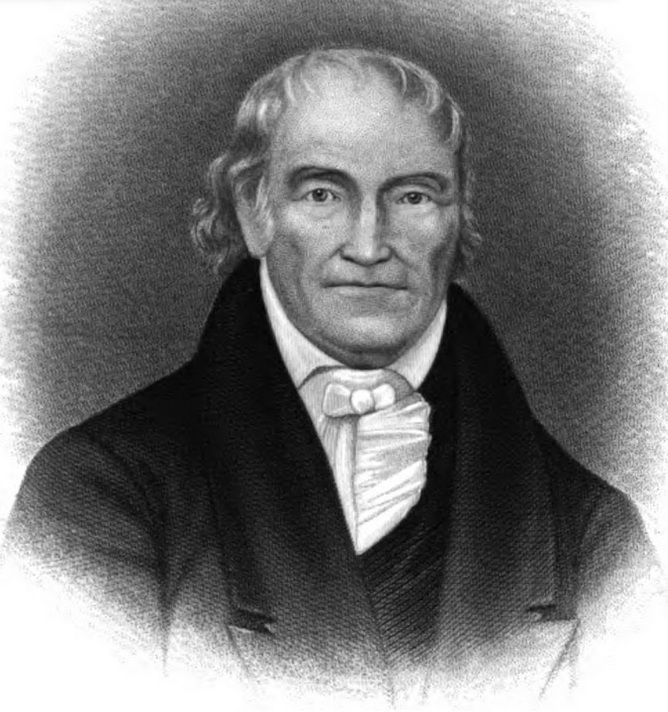
Nominee	Jonas Galusha
Party	Democratic-Republican
Popular vote	15,243
Percentage	95.32%
- County results Galusha: 80–90% 90–100%
Governor before election
Jonas Galusha
Democratic-Republican
Elected Governor
Jonas Galusha
Democratic-Republican

The 1818 Vermont gubernatorial election took place on September 1, 1818. It resulted in the election of Jonas Galusha to a one-year term.

The Vermont General Assembly met in Montpelier on October 8. The Vermont House of Representatives appointed a committee to review the votes of the freemen of Vermont for governor, lieutenant governor, treasurer, and members of the governor's council. The Federalist Party was largely defunct by 1818, and did not nominate candidates for statewide office, though a "People's Ticket" nominated incumbents Galusha, Paul Brigham, and Benjamin Swan for governor, lieutenant governor, and treasurer while endorsing a mix of Democratic-Republicans and Federalists for lesser offices. As a result of the Federalist Party's demise, the committee determined that incumbent Jonas Galusha had won a one-year term with only a scattering of votes for other candidates.

In the election for lieutenant governor, the legislature's canvassing committee determined that Brigham had also won election to a one-year term. With no Federalist opponent, Brigham won with a scattering of votes for other candidates. According to a contemporary newspaper article, the vote totals were: Brigham, 14,609 (96.3%); scattering, 563 (3.7%).

Benjamin Swan was elected to a one-year term as treasurer, his nineteenth. Though nominally a Federalist, Swan was endorsed by the Democratic-Republicans, and was unopposed for reelection. A contemporary newspaper article recorded the vote totals in the treasurer's race as 10,461 (99.9%) for Swan and 6 (.01%) scattering.

In the race for governor, the results of the popular vote were reported as follows.

== Results ==
1818 Vermont gubernatorial election
Party	Candidate	Votes	%
Democratic-Republican	Jonas Galusha (incumbent)	15,243	95.32
Write-in		749	4.68
Total votes		15,992	100.0
