= 1809 Vermont gubernatorial election =

- September 5, 1809
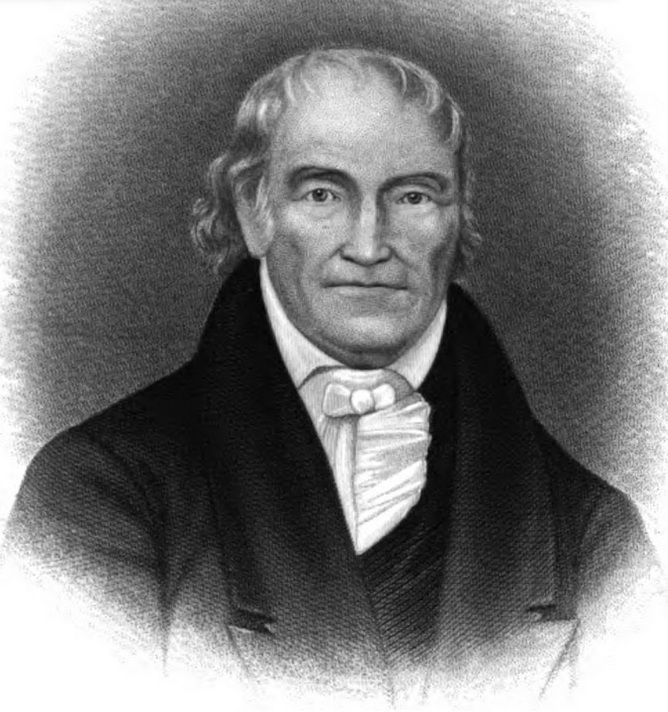

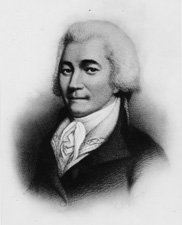
Nominee	Jonas Galusha	Isaac Tichenor
Party	Democratic-Republican	Federalist
Popular vote	14,583	13,467
Percentage	51.08%	47.17%
- County results Galusha: 50–60% 60–70% Tichenor: 40–50% 50–60% 60–70% 70–80%
Governor before election
Isaac Tichenor
Federalist
Elected Governor
Jonas Galusha
Democratic-Republican

The 1809 Vermont gubernatorial election took place on September 5, 1809. It resulted in the election of Jonas Galusha to a one-year term.

The Vermont General Assembly met in Montpelier on October 12. The Vermont House of Representatives appointed a committee to examine the votes of the freemen of Vermont for governor, lieutenant governor, treasurer, and members of the governor's council.

The committee's examination of the votes showed that Jonas Galusha had defeated incumbent Governor Isaac Tichenor for a one-year term. In the election for lieutenant governor, the voters selected Paul Brigham for a one-year term, his fourteenth. Benjamin Swan was elected to his tenth one-year term as treasurer.

In the races for lieutenant governor and treasurer, the vote totals and names of other candidates were not recorded. In the race for governor, a contemporary newspaper article reported the results as follows.

== Results ==
1809 Vermont gubernatorial election
Party	Candidate	Votes	%
Democratic-Republican	Jonas Galusha	14,583	51.08
Federalist	Isaac Tichenor (incumbent)	13,467	47.17
Write-in		498	1.75
Total votes		28,548	100.0
