= Elon Galusha =

American attorney and clergyman

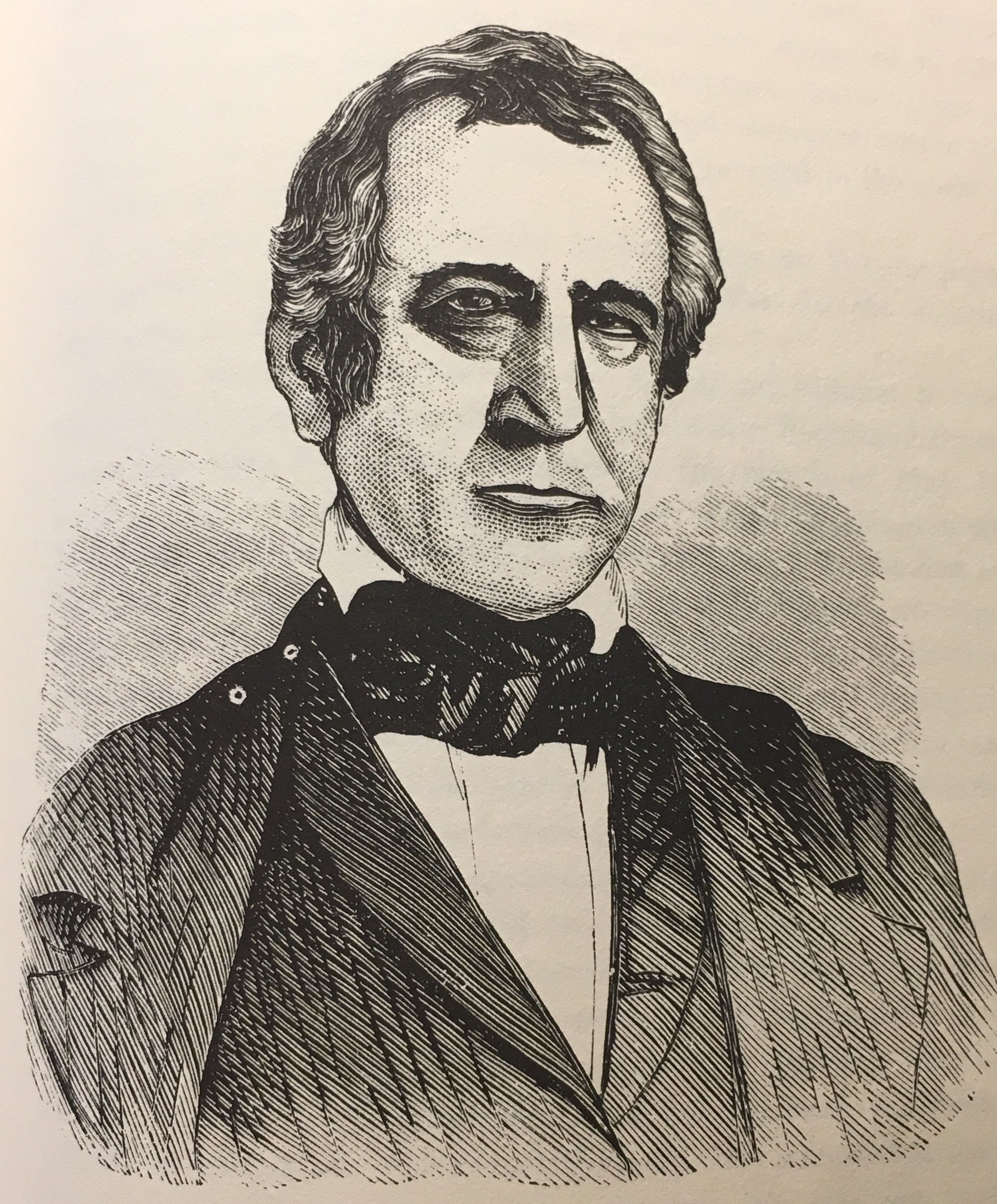
From 1874's History of the Second Advent Message and Mission, Doctrine and People

Elon Galusha (June 18, 1790 – January 6, 1856) was a lawyer and a Baptist preacher who was active in reform activities of the early 19th century in New York. He was the son of Jonas Galusha, the 6th and 8th governor of Vermont. He also adopted and promoted the teachings of William Miller.

== Biography ==
Galusha was born June 18, 1790, in Shaftsbury, Vermont. His father was Jonas Galusha, the governor of Vermont. Galusha received the honorary degree of M. A. from the University of Vermont in 1816, and an honorary M. A. from Brown University in 1820.

Galusha died January 6, 1856, in Lockport, New York.

== Abolitionist activities ==
Galusha is in the centre of the right front group third row back in this painting which shows him at the 1840 Anti-Slavery Convention. Move your cursor to identify Galusha or click icon to enlarge

Galusha took a firm stance against slavery. In 1836 he, along with other men of New York, including Obadiah N. Bush of Rochester, was named to represent New York at the third anniversary of the American Anti-Slavery Society meeting. He served as the first president of the Baptist Anti-Slavery Society. He promoted the Liberty Party and preached about the evils of slavery. Following his withdrawal from the Baptist denomination, he hosted abolitionist meetings at his church in Lockport.

== Millerite connection ==
Galusha leaned toward a premillennial understanding of Bible prophecy. After personal deliberation, and having read William Miller's Lectures, Galusha joined the Millerite movement wholeheartedly under the influence of a fellow preacher, Nathaniel N. Whiting.

Galusha served as president of the Albany Conference on April 29, 1845, following the Great Disappointment.
