= 1817 Vermont gubernatorial election =

- September 2, 1817
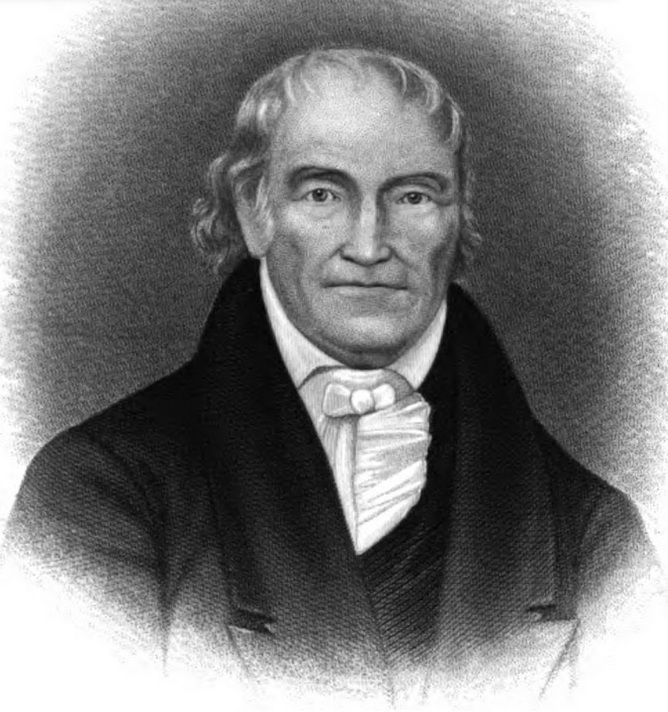

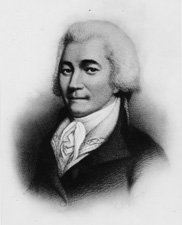
Nominee	Jonas Galusha	Isaac Tichenor
Party	Democratic-Republican	Federalist
Popular vote	13,756	7,430
Percentage	64.93%	35.07%
- County results Galusha: 50–60% 60–70% 70–80% 80–90% Tichenor: 50–60% 60–70%
Governor before election
Jonas Galusha
Democratic-Republican
Elected Governor
Jonas Galusha
Democratic-Republican

The 1817 Vermont gubernatorial election took place on September 2, 1817. It resulted in the election of Jonas Galusha to a one-year term.

The Vermont General Assembly met in Montpelier on October 9. The Vermont House of Representatives appointed a committee to review the votes of the freemen of Vermont for governor, lieutenant governor, treasurer, and members of the governor's council. The committee determined that incumbent Jonas Galusha had defeated U.S. Senator Isaac Tichenor to win a one-year term.

In the election for lieutenant governor, the legislature's canvassing committee determined that incumbent Paul Brigham had attained a majority over former lieutenant governor William Chamberlain to win the election to a one-year term. According to a contemporary newspaper article, the vote totals were: Brigham, 13,307 (63.2%); Chamberlain 7,748 (36.8%).

Benjamin Swan was elected to a one-year term as treasurer, his eighteenth. Swan, a Federalist was also endorsed by the Democratic-Republicans, and so was effectively unopposed for reelection. According to contemporary newspaper articles, Swan received 16,962 votes, and no votes were recorded for any other candidates.

In the race for governor, the results of the popular vote were reported as follows.

== Results ==
1817 Vermont gubernatorial election
Party	Candidate	Votes	%
Democratic-Republican	Jonas Galusha (incumbent)	13,756	64.93
Federalist	Isaac Tichenor	7,430	35.07
Total votes		21,186	100.0
