= 1813 Vermont gubernatorial election =

- September 7, 1813
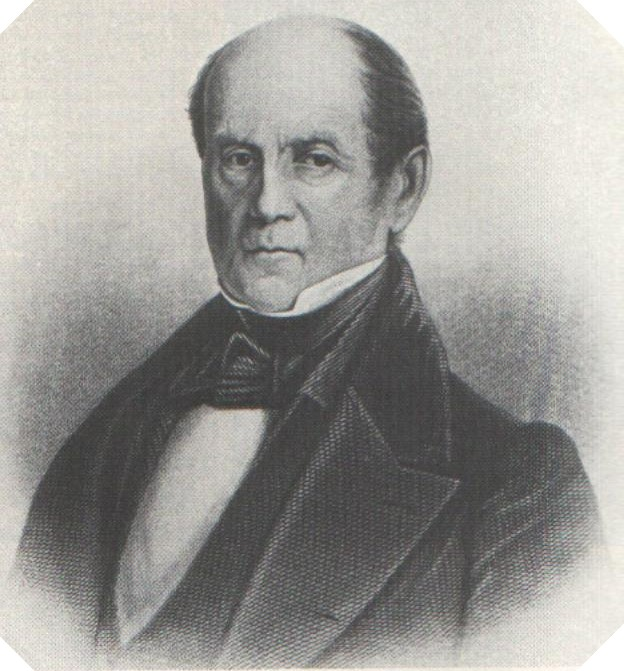

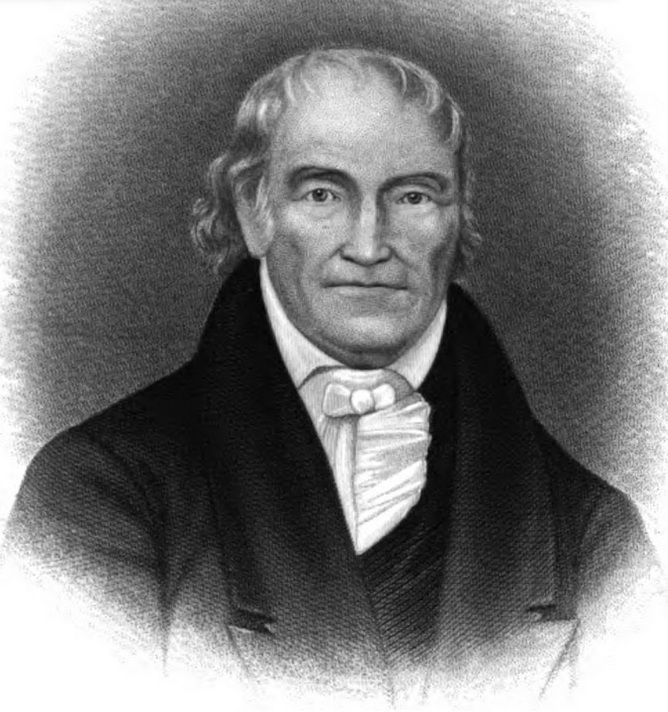
Nominee	Martin Chittenden	Jonas Galusha
Party	Federalist	Democratic-Republican
Electoral vote	112	111
Popular vote	16,532	16,838
Percentage	48.66%	49.56%
- County results Chittenden: 50–60% 60–70% 70–80% Galusha: 50–60% 60–70% No Data/Vote
Governor before election
Jonas Galusha
Democratic-Republican
Elected Governor
Martin Chittenden
Federalist

The 1813 Vermont gubernatorial election took place on September 7, 1813. It resulted in the election of Martin Chittenden to a one-year term.

The Vermont General Assembly met in Montpelier on October 14. The Vermont House of Representatives appointed a committee to review the votes of the freemen of Vermont for governor, lieutenant governor, treasurer, and members of the governor's council. The committee disallowed several hundred votes for Jonas Galusha, and the result was that neither Galusha nor Martin Chittenden attained the majority required by the Vermont Constitution. In such cases, the governor is chosen by the combined vote of the Vermont General Assembly.

On October 21, the General Assembly met to select the governor. In secret balloting, Chittenden was elected by a vote of 112 to 111. Supporters of Galusha argued that 112 members of the Assembly had voted for Galusha, which would have resulted in a tie, so a ballot must have been lost or intentionally not counted. They proposed to place all 112 Galusha supporters under oath to affirm that they had voted for Galusha. Chittenden supporters claimed that one supposed Galusha supporter (not named) had promised to withhold his vote in order to give Chittenden an advantage. While the House debated the question, Chittenden took the oath of office from Nathaniel Chipman, the chief judge of the Vermont Supreme Court, and notified the House that he was ready to deliver his inaugural speech. Chittenden was allowed to proceed, effectively ending the controversy over his election.

In the election for lieutenant governor, after the legislature's canvassing committee disallowed ballots for Brigham, contemporary newspaper articles reported the popular vote results as William Chamberlain (Federalist) 15,557 (48.8%); Paul Brigham (Democratic-Republican) 15,393 (48.2%); scattering 958 (3.0%). Because neither Chamberlain nor Brigham attained a majority, the contest was decided by the General Assembly. In the Assembly vote, Chamberlain was declared the winner by the same 112 to 111 margin by which Chittenden defeated Galusha.

Benjamin Swan was elected to a one-year term as treasurer, his fourteenth, though the vote totals were not recorded. Swan, a Federalist was also endorsed by the Democratic-Republicans, and so was effectively unopposed for reelection.

In the race for governor, a contemporary newspaper article reported the results of the popular vote as follows.

== Results ==
1813 Vermont gubernatorial election
Party	Candidate	Votes	%	±%
Federalist	Martin Chittenden	16,532	48.66	+4%
Democratic-Republican	Jonas Galusha (incumbent)	16,838	49.56	−4%
Write-in		605	1.78	0%
Total votes		33,975	100	N/A
