= 1814 Vermont gubernatorial election =

- September 6, 1814
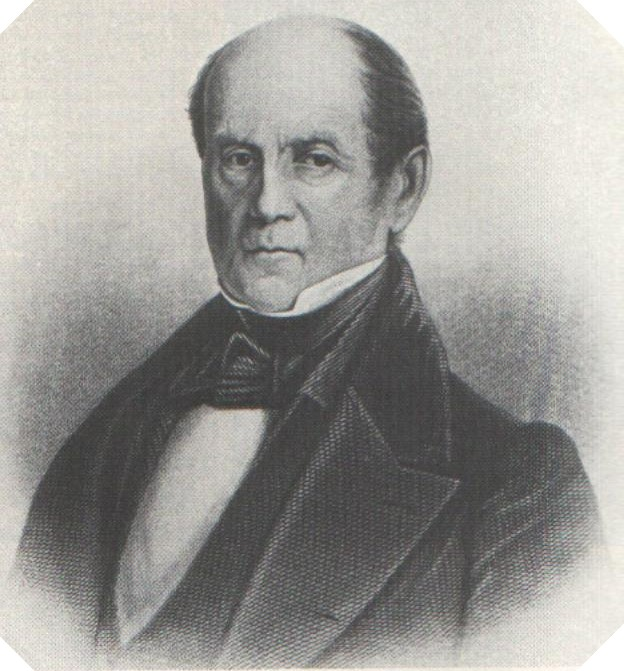

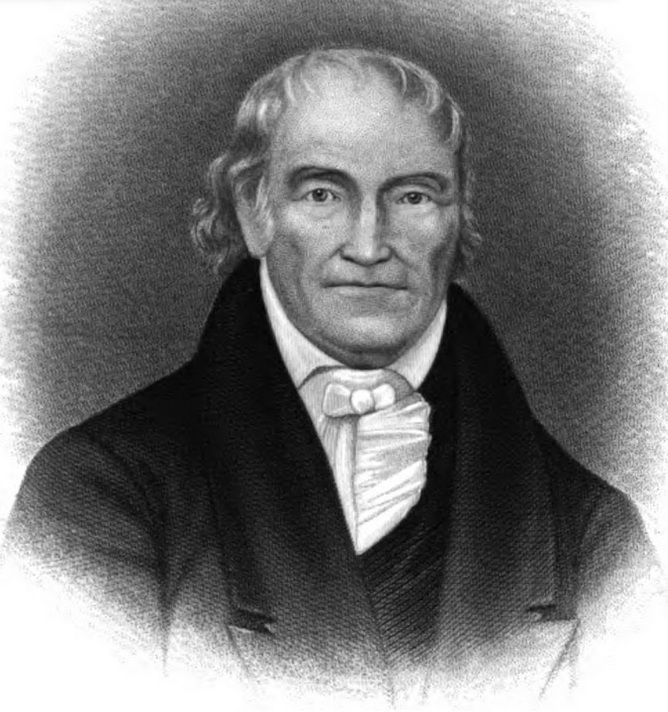
Nominee	Martin Chittenden	Jonas Galusha
Party	Federalist	Democratic-Republican
Electoral vote	123	91
Popular vote	17,466	17,411
Percentage	49.44%	49.28%
- County results Chittenden: 50–60% 60–70% 70–80% Galusha: 50–60% 60–70% No Data/Vote
Governor before election
Martin Chittenden
Federalist
Elected Governor
Martin Chittenden
Federalist

The 1814 Vermont gubernatorial election took place on September 6, 1814. It resulted in the election of Martin Chittenden to a one-year term.

The Vermont General Assembly met in Montpelier on October 13. The Vermont House of Representatives appointed a committee to review the votes of the freemen of Vermont for governor, lieutenant governor, treasurer, and members of the governor's council. The committee determined that neither Jonas Galusha nor Martin Chittenden had attained the majority required by the Vermont Constitution. In such cases, the governor is chosen by the combined vote of the Vermont General Assembly.

On October 14, the General Assembly met to select the governor. In secret balloting, Chittenden was elected to his second one-year term by a vote of 123 to 91, with one vote counted as scattering.

In the election for lieutenant governor, the legislature's canvassing committee determined that neither William Chamberlain nor Paul Brigham had attained a majority. According to contemporary newspaper articles, the vote totals were: Chamberlain, 16,648 (49.1%); Brigham, 16,598 (49.0%); scattering, 655 (1.9%). The contest was decided by the General Assembly, which elected Chamberlain to a second one-year term by a vote of 118 to 91.

Benjamin Swan was elected to a one-year term as treasurer, his fifteenth, though the vote totals were not recorded. Swan, a Federalist was also endorsed by the Democratic-Republicans, and so was effectively unopposed for reelection.

In the race for governor, the results of the popular vote were reported as follows.

== Results ==
1814 Vermont gubernatorial election
Party	Candidate	Votes	%
Federalist	Martin Chittenden (incumbent)	17,466	49.44
Democratic-Republican	Jonas Galusha	17,411	49.28
Write-in		451	1.28
Total votes		35,328	100
