= 1815 Vermont gubernatorial election =

- September 5, 1815
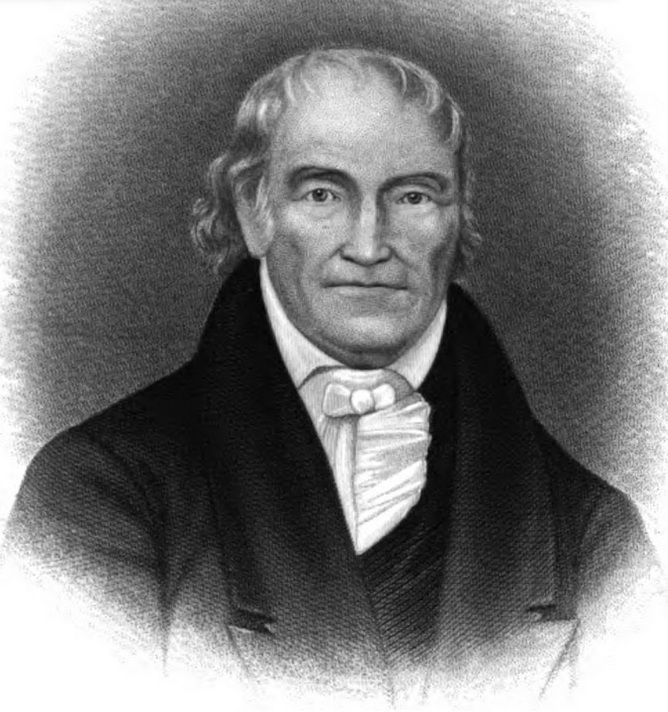

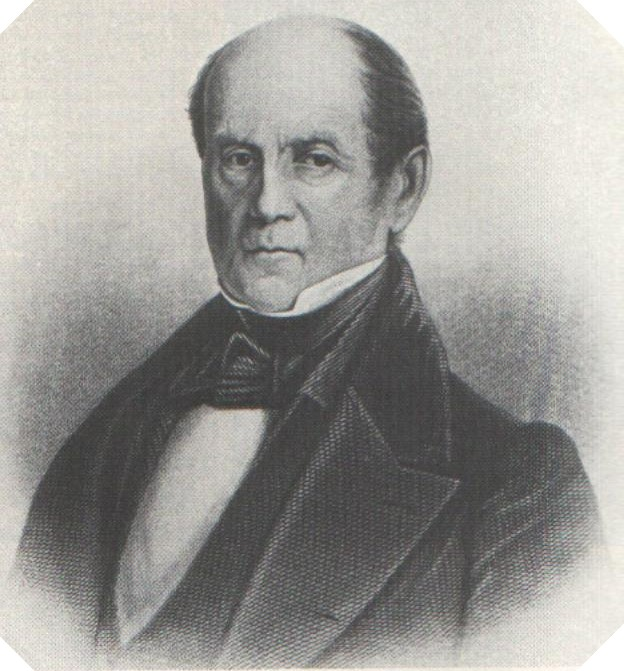
Nominee	Jonas Galusha	Martin Chittenden
Party	Democratic-Republican	Federalist
Popular vote	18,055	16,632
Percentage	51.21%	47.17%
- County results Galusha: 40–50% 50–60% 60–70% Chittenden: 50–60% 60–70%
Governor before election
Martin Chittenden
Federalist
Elected Governor
Jonas Galusha
Democratic-Republican

The 1815 Vermont gubernatorial election took place on September 5, 1815. It resulted in the election of Jonas Galusha to a one-year term.

The Vermont General Assembly met in Montpelier on October 12. The Vermont House of Representatives appointed a committee to review the votes of the freemen of Vermont for governor, lieutenant governor, treasurer, and members of the governor's council. The committee determined that former governor Jonas Galusha had defeated incumbent Martin Chittenden to win a one-year term.

In the election for lieutenant governor, the legislature's canvassing committee determined that former lieutenant governor Paul Brigham had attained a majority over incumbent William Chamberlain to win election to a one-year term. According to a contemporary newspaper article, the vote totals were: Brigham, 16,942 (50.4%); Chamberlain 15,841 (47.2%); scattering, 807 (2.4%).

Benjamin Swan was elected to a one-year term as treasurer, his sixteenth, though the vote totals were not recorded. Swan, a Federalist was also endorsed by the Democratic-Republicans, and so was effectively unopposed for reelection.

In the race for governor, the results of the popular vote were reported as follows.

== Results ==
1815 Vermont gubernatorial election
Party	Candidate	Votes	%
Democratic-Republican	Jonas Galusha	18,055	51.21
Federalist	Martin Chittenden (incumbent)	16,632	47.17
Write-in		571	1.62
Total votes		35,258	100.0
