= Nathaniel White (disambiguation) =

Nathaniel White (born 1960) is an American serial killer.

Nathaniel White may also refer to:

- Nathaniel White (businessman) (1811–1880), American businessman
- Nathaniel Whitworth White (1837–1916), Canadian lawyer and politician
- Nate White (Nathaniel Ridgway White, 1910–1984), American journalist

== See also ==
- Nat Harper (Nathaniel White Harper, 1865–1954), Australian politician
- Nathaniel N. Whiting (1792–1872), Baptist minister
- Nathaniel Whiting (mill owner) (1609-c. 1682), Massachusetts settler
