= Samuel Paddock Strong House =

Historic house in Vermont, United States

- U.S. National Register of Historic Places
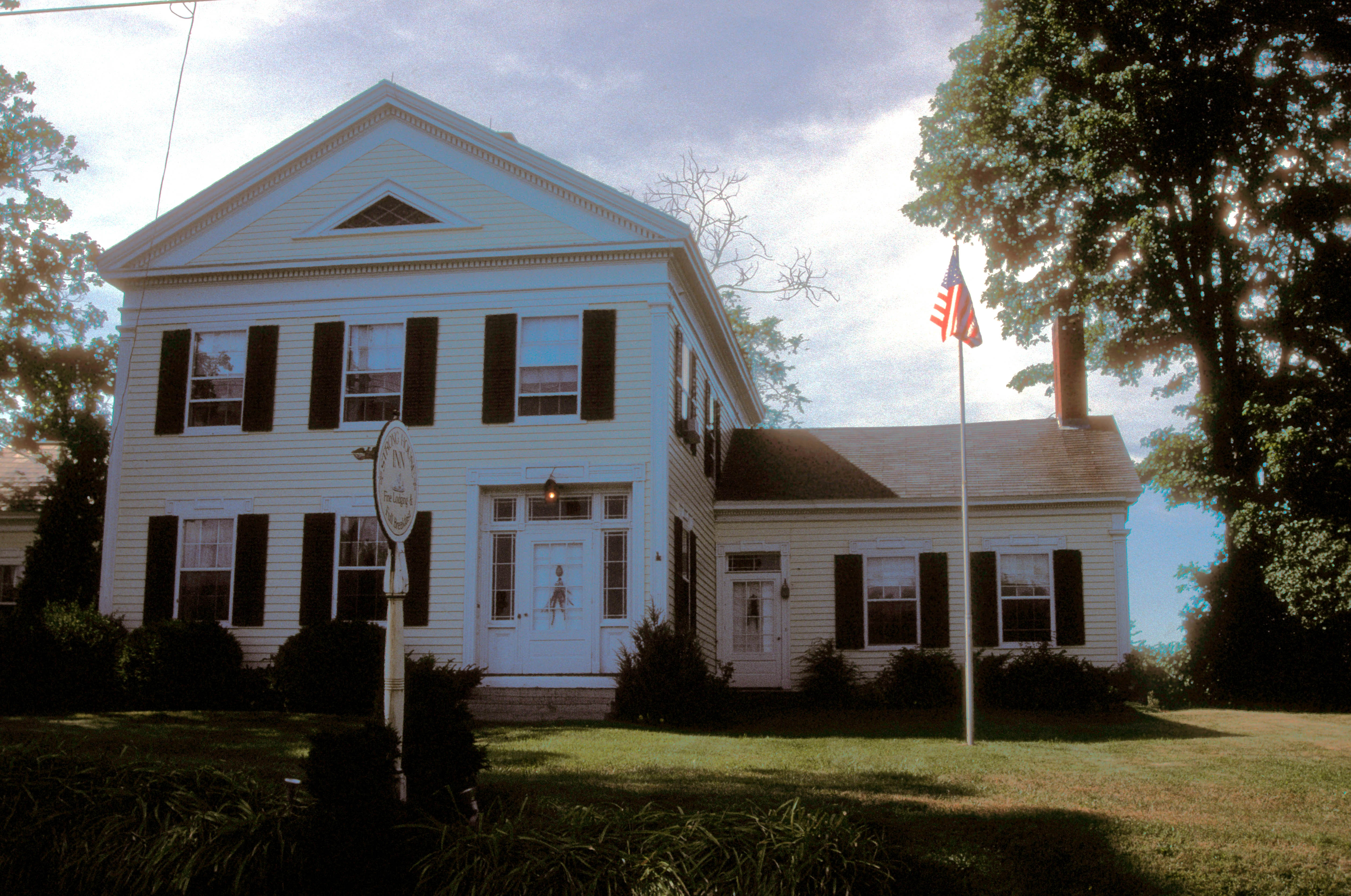

- Location within Vermont Location within the United States
- Location: 94 W. Main St., Vergennes, Vermont
- Coordinates: 44°9′41″N 73°15′41″W
- Area: 2 acres (0.81 ha)
- Built: 1839
- Architectural style: Greek Revival
- NRHP reference No.: 79000216
- Added to NRHP: August 15, 1979

The Samuel Paddock Strong House is a historic house at 94 West Main Street in Vergennes, Vermont. Built in the 1830s for a prominent local businessman, it is a well-preserved example of Greek Revival architecture. It was listed on the National Register of Historic Places in 1979. It now houses the Strong House Inn.

== Description and history ==
The Strong House is located southwest of downtown Vergennes, on the northwest side of West Main Street (Vermont Route 22A). It consists of a 2 1/2-story main block, covered by a front-facing gabled roof, with integral flanking side-gable single-story ells. It is a wood-frame structure, with clapboard siding and a stone foundation. The building corners are pilastered, with a dentillated entablature encircling the main block, and a pedimented gable with triangular fan window at its center. The main entrance is in the rightmost bay of the 3-bay facade, recessed with sidelight and transom windows in an opening framed by pilasters and an entablature. The interior has largely been modernized, but three original fireplaces surviving, including one of locally quarried black marble.

Samuel Paddock Strong, the son of Samuel Strong, purchased the land for this house in 1832, and probably built the house not long afterward. Its designs are based in part on the published patterns of Asher Benjamin. Strong was the grandson of one of the area's early settlers, and achieved prominence in the community as president of the Bank of Vergennes and of the Rutland and Burlington Railroad.

== See also ==
- National Register of Historic Places listings in Addison County, Vermont
