= Gen. Samuel Strong House =

Historic house in Vermont, United States

- U.S. National Register of Historic Places
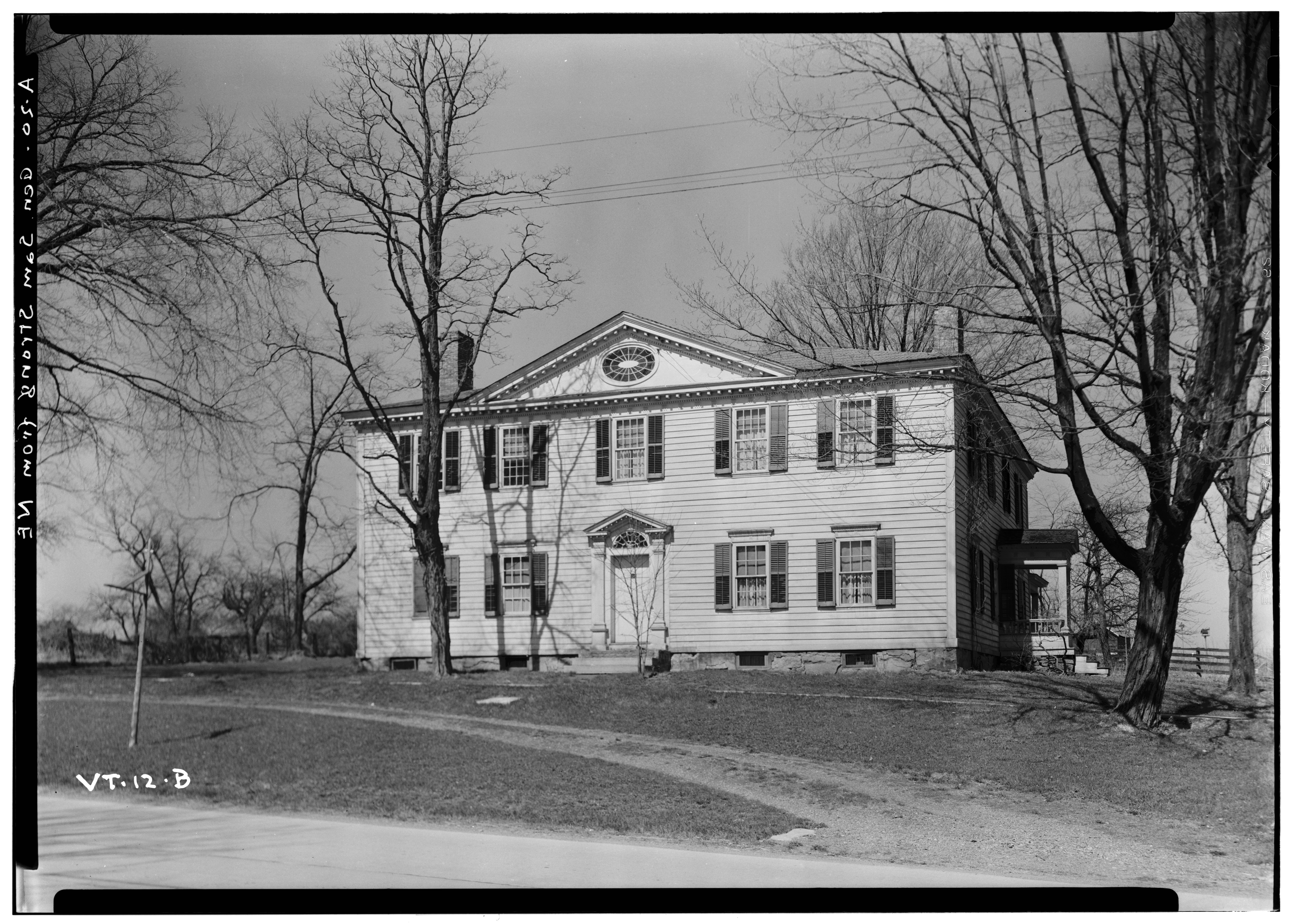
- c. 1937 HABS photo

- Location within Vermont Location within the United States
- Location: 64? W. Main St., Vergennes, Vermont
- Coordinates: 44°9′50″N 73°15′30″W
- Area: 2.5 acres (1.0 ha)
- Built: 1796
- Architectural style: Early Republic, Georgian, Adamesque
- NRHP reference No.: 73000182
- Added to NRHP: April 11, 1973

The Gen. Samuel Strong House is a historic house on West Main Street in Vergennes, Vermont. Built in 1796, it is one of Vermont's finest examples late Georgian/early Federal period architecture. It was listed on the National Register of Historic Places in 1973.

== Description and history ==
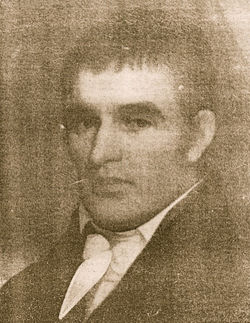
Major General Samuel Strong

The General Samuel Strong House stands on the north side of West Main Street, west of downtown Vergennes and just north of the road's junction with Panton Road. It is fronted by a shallow semicircular drive, and is screened from the road by trees. It is a two-story L-shaped wood-frame structure, with a hip roof and clapboard siding. The street-facing southern main facade is five bays wide, with a center entrance flanked by pilasters and topped by a half-round transom window and gabled pediment. A low gable rises from the roof above the center three bays, with an oval window at its center. The eaves of the gable and roof are dentillated. The east-facing secondary facade is less elaborate than the main one, with its entrance sheltered by a gabled porch.

The house was built about 1796, supposedly by Samuel Strong himself as his residence. Strong was a local militia leader during the War of 1812 who was instrumental in organizing local forces for the Battle of Plattsburgh near the end of that war.

== See also ==
- National Register of Historic Places listings in Addison County, Vermont
