= Samuel Strong (Vermont politician) =

American militia officer and politician

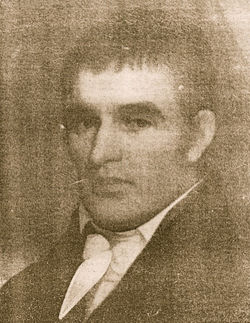
- Strong circa 1815. From the web site of the Daughters of the American Revolution John Strong Mansion Museum

Assistant Judge of Addison County, Vermont
- In office 1813–1815 Serving with Ezra Hoyt
- Preceded by: Samuel Shepard
- Succeeded by: Charles Rich
- In office 1805–1808 Serving with Charles Rich
- Preceded by: Abraham Dibble
- Succeeded by: Henry Olin

Mayor of Vergennes, Vermont
- In office 1811–1815
- Preceded by: Josias Smith
- Succeeded by: Smith Booth

Member of the Vermont House of Representatives from Vergennes
- In office 1804–1806
- Preceded by: Amos Marsh
- Succeeded by: Thomas Byrd

Sheriff of Addison County, Vermont
- In office 1787–1789
- Preceded by: Gamaliel Painter
- Succeeded by: John Chipman

Personal details
- Born: July 17, 1762 Addison, Vermont, U.S.
- Died: December 5, 1832 (aged 70) Vergennes, Vermont, U.S.
- Resting place: Vergennes Burying Ground, Vergennes, Vermont
- Party: Federalist
- Spouse: Mercy Bloomer (m. 1787-1832, his death)
- Relations: John Strong (father); Frederick E. Woodbridge (grandson); Moses M. Strong (nephew)
- Children: 5
- Profession: Farmer; Businessman

Samuel Strong (July 17, 1762 - December 5, 1832) was an American businessman, farmer, militia officer, and politician from Vermont. He attained the rank of major general, and was most notable for his leadership of a contingent of Vermont militia soldiers during the War of 1812's Battle of Plattsburgh.

== Early life ==
Samuel Strong was born in Salisbury, Connecticut on July 17, 1762, the son of John Strong (1738-1816) and Agnes (McCure) Strong (1740-1829). His parents moved to Addison, Vermont in 1766, and were among the town's first white settlers. Samuel Strong was raised and educated in Addison and became a farmer. In 1787, he was elected Sheriff of Addison County, and he served a two-year term.

== Move to Vergennes ==
In 1793, Strong moved to Vergennes, where he farmed and became involved in several business ventures. Strong's enterprises included timberlands, a sawmill, and a wool carding factory, where he was among the first in New England to make use of mechanical carding machines rather than disentangling, cleaning, and intermixing fibers by hand.

In addition to his farming and business interests, Strong was active in local politics and government. He was elected to the board of aldermen soon after his move to Vergennes. He represented Vergennes in the Vermont House of Representatives in 1804 and 1805. From 1805 to 1807 and 1813 to 1815 he served as assistant judge of the Addison County Court. From 1811 to 1815 he served as mayor of Vergennes.

== Military career ==
Strong was a longtime member of the Vermont Militia, and advanced through the ranks to earn promotion to brigadier general as commander of 1st Brigade, 3rd Division in 1797. He was promoted to major general in 1804 and appointed as commander of the 3rd Division. He served in this position until 1810, when he resigned.

In the summer of 1814, Strong received word that volunteers were needed to counter the advance of the British Army near Plattsburgh, New York. Strong immediately traveled to Burlington, Vermont, where he was unanimously chosen to take the command of the Vermonters who had volunteered. During the September Battle of Plattsburgh, Strong's militia contingent took part in the successful American defense, which caused the British to retreat to Canada. After the battle, Strong was commended by Governor Martin Chittenden and the Vermont General Assembly.

Strong was the 1816 Federalist nominee for governor, and lost to Jonas Galusha. In 1818, the New York State Legislature presented Strong a commemorative sword as a token of their appreciation for his War of 1812 service.

== Later life ==
In 1816, Strong traveled to Georgia in search of a warmer climate that would enable him to regain his health, which had been impaired as the result of wartime service. He remained for only a few months before deciding to return to Vergennes. Strong remained active in several business ventures, including a Lake Champlain ferry from Ferrisburgh, Vermont to Essex, New York. He also constructed and managed a turnpike from Middlebury to Vergennes, and from Vergennes to Adams Ferry in Panton, Vermont. In 1827, he was one of the original incorporators of the Vergennes Bank, He was selected as the bank's first president, and served in this position until his death.

Strong died in Vergennes on December 5, 1832. He was buried at Vergennes Burying Ground in Vergennes. His home, the Gen. Samuel Strong House, still stands in Vergennes and was added to the National Register of Historic Places in 1973.

== Family ==
In 1787, Strong married Mercy Bloomer (1763-1852) of Dorset, Vermont. They were the parents of five children who lived to adulthood.

- Mary, who was the wife of Roswell D. Hopkins and daughter-in-law of Roswell Hopkins.
- Clarissa, the wife of Enoch D. Woodbridge, daughter-in-law of Enoch Woodbridge, and mother of Frederick E. Woodbridge.
- Susan, who never married and lived with her mother in Vergennes.
- Samuel Paddock, who took over management of his father's business interests and also served as a general in the state militia.
- Electa, who was the wife of William Hunter Smith.

Strong's siblings included attorney Moses Strong (1772-1842), who was the father of Wisconsin politician Moses M. Strong.

Party political offices
Preceded by Martin Chittenden	Federalist nominee for Governor of Vermont; 1816	Succeeded by Isaac Tichenor
