= Killington, Vermont secession movement =

Legal battle over the voted defection of a Vermont town to New Hampshire

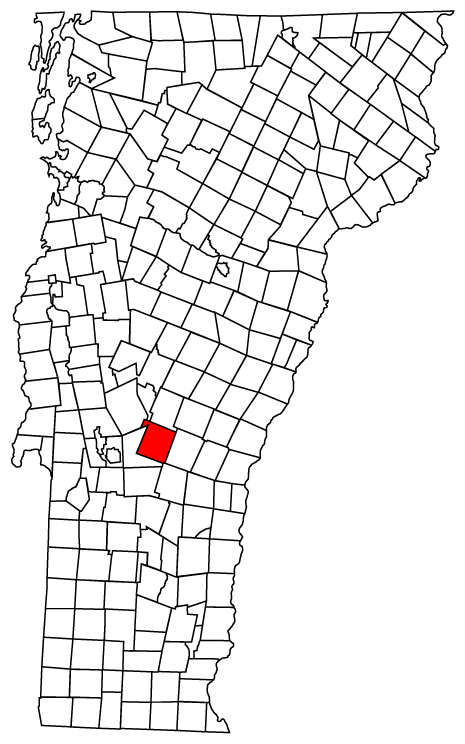
- Location of Killington, Vermont
- Formation: 2004
- Dissolved: 2005
- Type: Secession movement
- Purpose: Pursuing secession from Vermont
- Location: Killington, Vermont, United States

At the 2004 and 2005 town meetings, the citizens of the ski resort community of Killington, Vermont, voted in favor of pursuing secession from Vermont and admission into the state of New Hampshire, which lies 25 miles (40 km) to the east.

== Adherents' claims ==
Supporters claim that the townspeople pay the state $10 million per year in property taxes and $10 million a year in sales taxes (as well as income and other taxes), but receive only $1 million a year to help fund their school system. In the words of Town Selectman Butch Findeisen, "There is a point where sharing turns to looting."

An economic study commissioned by the town determined Killington would save a minimum of $7 million per year, excluding individual state income tax savings.

The town states that it has suffered long term economic problems with restrained development under the state's Act 250 environmental law. This statute controlled growth by establishing environmental review boards, where those affected by the planned development can challenge a proposed development plan. Supporters claim the expense of dealing with this has led Killington Ski Resort to have the highest lift ticket prices in the country. Supporters further claim that the state of Vermont has steadfastly refused to redress the grievances of the town and its people, and that their own state legislator, who represents Killington and Mendon, Vermont, refuses to stand up for the town's interests.

On March 2, 2004, 200–300 residents voted, by voice vote, for the secession proposal, passing it by a wide margin. On March 1, 2005, the measure was passed again, this time by ballot, with nearly 2/3 voting in favor.

== Arguments in opposition to secession ==
Others dispute many of the town's claims:

The town manager would love to tell you how many millions of dollars Killington sent to the state. Well many of those millions of dollars are sales and rooms and meals taxes. Those weren’t sent from Killington to the state. They were sent from tourists and others that were in Killington and were required to pay taxes levied by the state of Vermont. —Rep. Mark Young (R-Orwell)

New Hampshire lacks a general sales tax, but it does have a rooms and meals tax. New Hampshire also has what amounts to a statewide property tax, like Vermont's. Like all other states, both Vermont and New Hampshire levy high taxes on gasoline and tobacco. Like Vermont (but unlike some other states), New Hampshire does not guarantee that a given municipality will get any minimum percentage of tax revenues back as state aid. State aid in both states is allocated according to population and other factors not directly related to tax revenues.

=== Support of education ===
School funding has long been a matter of contention in Vermont, primarily centering on the substantial disparity in ability to fund schools through property taxes, between towns with large grand lists and those with small ones. In 1997, the Vermont Supreme Court, in the case of Brigham v. State, decided that the disparity was such as to unconstitutionally deprive children in poorer towns of equal opportunity to an education. The court left it to the legislature to come up with a remedy. The legislature responded by passing a highly controversial law known as Act 60. This law provided for a statewide school property tax, per-pupil block grants, and sharing of tax revenue from property wealthy towns to property poor towns. Act 60 was revised in 2003 by Act 68, but retains the statewide property tax. It is as a result of these pieces of legislation that Killington pays more property tax to the state than it receives in the form of block grants. The extent to which a town such as Killington may receive benefits in addition to the block grant, such as possibly lower social welfare costs and higher worker productivity as a result of a better educated population in the state, as well as from general state services (such as highway maintenance, tourism promotion, etc.), is less easily quantified.

== Disposition of the secession request ==
The legal decision will be made by the states of Vermont and New Hampshire and the United States Congress. Article IV of the U.S. Constitution requires that when the boundaries of existing states are altered, the action needs the consent of the legislatures of all states involved, as well as of Congress. The New Hampshire state legislature passed a law in 2005 authorizing a commission which would negotiate with the State of Vermont, if Vermont ever chooses to establish a corresponding commission. The Vermont legislature is generally expected to reject the idea of ceding Killington to New Hampshire. Even if Vermont votes in favor of Killington's secession, the New Hampshire bill does not obligate the Granite State to accept Killington: the bill merely authorizes the beginnings of negotiations. If no deal can be reached, Killington would remain part of Vermont.

Supporters have threatened a federal court battle, but the legal grounds for such a lawsuit remain unclear, since the U.S. Constitution provides no mechanism for redrawing state lines without the consent of the legislatures of the states concerned and the US Congress.

In 2005, Vermont state Reps. Mark Young (R-Orwell), Richard Marron (R-Stowe) and Kathleen Keenan (D-St. Albans City) introduced House Bill 426 that would have required Killington to pay "exit fees" to reimburse the state for "stranded assets of the state, including those relating to education, transportation, and public service". The legislation would also have stripped Killington residents of all benefits of Vermont resident status, including instate tuition and tuition assistance. The bill was not acted upon by the House, and effectively died with the adjournment of the 2005–2006 Legislative session on June 1, 2006.
