= Jonas Galusha =

American judge and governor of Vermont (1753-1834)

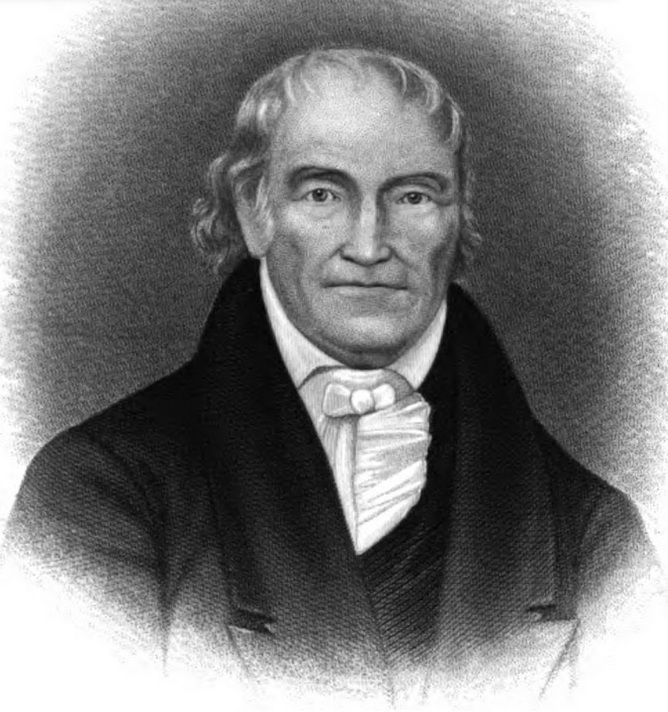
- Frontispiece of Volume V of Records of the Governor and Council of the State of Vermont. 1877.

6th and 8th Governor of Vermont
- In office October 14, 1815 – October 23, 1820
- Lieutenant: Paul Brigham
- Preceded by: Martin Chittenden
- Succeeded by: Richard Skinner
- In office October 14, 1809 – October 23, 1813
- Lieutenant: Paul Brigham
- Preceded by: Isaac Tichenor
- Succeeded by: Martin Chittenden

Associate Judge of the Vermont Supreme Court
- In office 1807–1808 Serving with Royall Tyler, Theophilus Harrington
- Preceded by: Jonathan Robinson
- Succeeded by: David Fay

Member of the Vermont Governor's Council
- In office 1801–1807
- Preceded by: John Bridgman
- Succeeded by: Chauncey Langdon
- In office 1793–1799
- Preceded by: Timothy Brownson
- Succeeded by: John Bridgman

Member of the Vermont House of Representatives from Shaftsbury
- In office 1800–1801
- Preceded by: Gideon Olin
- Succeeded by: Jacob Galusha

Assistant Judge of Bennington County, Vermont
- In office 1800–1806
- Preceded by: Christopher Roberts
- Succeeded by: David Sheldon
- In office 1795–1797
- Preceded by: Gideon Brownson
- Succeeded by: Christopher Roberts

Sheriff of Bennington County, Vermont
- In office 1781–1787
- Preceded by: Benjamin Fay
- Succeeded by: David Robinson

Personal details
- Born: February 11, 1753 Norwich, Colony of Connecticut, British America
- Died: September 24, 1834 (aged 81) Shaftsbury, Vermont, U.S.
- Party: Democratic-Republican
- Spouse(s): Mary Chittenden; Martha "Patty" Sammons; Abigail Ward; Abigail "Nabby" Atwater Beach
- Children: 9, including Elon Galusha
- Occupation: Farmer; Innkeeper

Jonas Galusha (February 11, 1753 – September 24, 1834) was an American farmer and innkeeper. A militia veteran of the American Revolutionary War, he became active in politics as a Democratic-Republican and served as governor of Vermont from 1809 to 1813 and 1815 to 1820.

A native of Norwich, Connecticut, his family moved to Salisbury in 1769. In 1775, they moved to Shaftsbury, Vermont. Galusha became a farmer and innkeeper in Shaftsbury. Active in the militia, he commanded a company as a captain during the American Revolutionary War's Battle of Bennington in 1777.

After the war, Galusha became active in local government. After Vermont joined the Union in 1791, he joined the Democratic–Republican Party. Among the offices he held were sheriff of Bennington County (1781–1787), member of the governor's council (1793–1798 and 1801–1805), and assistant judge of the county court (1795–1797 and 1800–1806). Galusha also served in the Vermont House of Representatives from 1800 to 1801 and a judge of the Vermont Supreme Court from 1807 to 1808.

Galusha was elected governor in 1809 and won reelection each year until 1813. Most Democratic–Republican politicians supported US participation in the War of 1812; most Vermonters were opposed because of their lucrative trade with Canada. In 1813, Martin Chittenden, a Federalist and opponent of the war, won a narrow election for governor. In 1814, Chittenden again defeated Galusha in a close contest. By 1815, public opinion in Vermont had shifted, and Galusha was returned to the governorship. He continued to win reelection each year until 1819 and was not a candidate for another term in 1820.

After leaving office, Galusha resumed his farming and business pursuits. He died in Shaftsbury and was buried at Center Shaftsbury Cemetery.

== Biography ==
Galusha, born in Norwich in the Colony of Connecticut, moved with his siblings and his parents, Jacob and Lydia Huntington Galusha, to Salisbury in 1769. In 1775, his family then moved to Shaftsbury, Vermont.

Galusha's father, Jacob, was a farmer and a blacksmith. Though their educations were limited and from the common schools, he and his brothers were leading men in the town and to some extent in the state.

During the American Revolution his brother David was a colonel in the Green Mountain Boys, and Galusha was a captain, fighting in the Battle of Bennington on August 16, 1777.

In 1778, Galusha married Mary Chittenden, daughter of Thomas Chittenden, Governor of the independent Republic of Vermont. The couple had nine children. Their son, Truman Galusha (The Truman Galusha House), also married into the Chittenden family, and moved his family to Jericho, near Burlington. His home there is also listed on the National Register. Another son, Elon Galusha was a well-known Baptist clergyman, and famous abolitionist.

== Career ==
A farmer and an innkeeper, Galusha was elected Sheriff of Bennington County, and served in that capacity through annual elections from 1781 to 1787. In 1792 he was a member of the first Council of Censors after admission to the Union. (The Council of Censors met every seven years to review statutes passed by the Vermont General Assembly and ensure their constitutionality.) From 1793 to 1798 through successive elections, he was a member of the Governor's Council (a group of 12 men with powers which made it nearly equivalent to a co-ordinate branch of the legislature. During that time, his wife, Mary, died in 1794; and he subsequently married Martha "Patty" Sammons, who died in 1797. His third wife was Abigail Ward, who died in 1809. He was a 6-time candidate for Vermont's 1st congressional district: in 1796, 1802, 1804, 1806, and the regular and special elections in 1808.

Galusha was a county assistant judge from 1795 to 1798 and 1800 to 1806. He was a Judge of the Vermont Supreme Court in 1807 and in 1808. He married Abigail Ward in June 1808 and she died the following year. In 1808, he served as a presidential elector for the Democratic-Republican candidacy of James Madison.

The following year, Galusha was elected Governor of Vermont, serving until 1813. He was both the predecessor and the successor of the Federalist Martin Chittenden, brother of Galusha's first wife, Mary Chittenden. During his governorship, he encouraged war with the United Kingdom in 1812. In 1814 he was a delegate to the Constitutional Convention. Galusha served another term as Governor of Vermont, elected year by year from 1815 to 1820. He was a presidential elector in 1820, 1824, and 1828 elections.

Jonas Galusha was the namesake of Galusha Aaron Grow, a Congressman from Pennsylvania who served as Speaker of the United States House of Representatives. Grow's aunt, who resided in Vermont, was asked to choose his name at his birth, and she selected "Galusha" because she admired Jonas Galusha, and "Aaron" because it was the name of her husband.

== Death ==
Galusha's fourth wife, Abigail "Nabby" Atwater Beach Galusha died in 1831. He died in Shaftsbury in 1834. He was active in the Baptist Church. He is interred at the Center Shaftsbury Cemetery, Shaftsbury, Center Shaftsbury, Bennington County, Vermont.

== The Gov. Galusha Homestead ==
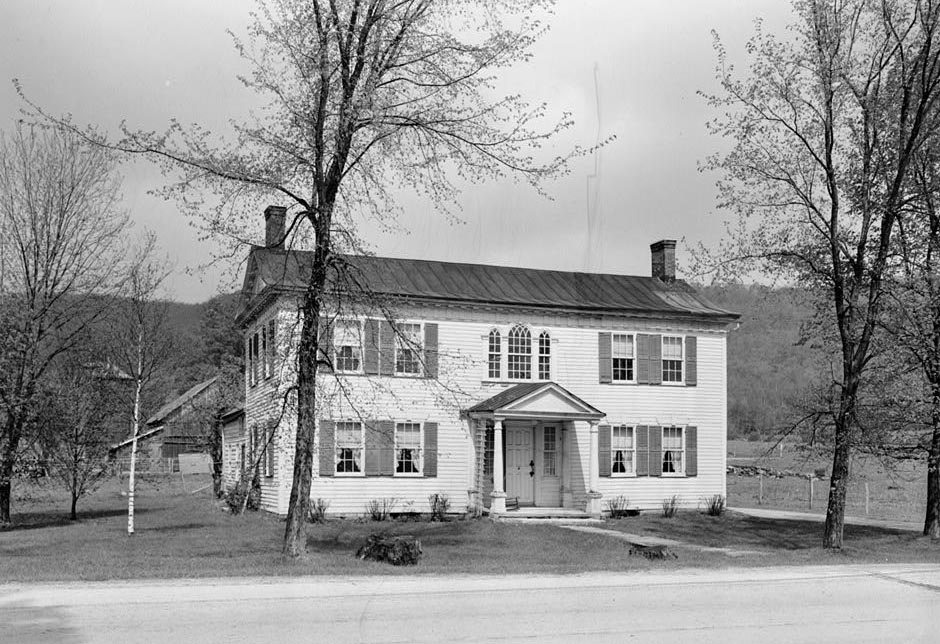
The Gov. Galusha Homestead

The imposing home known as The Gov. Galusha Homestead on Rt.7A in Center Shaftsbury, Vermont, is famous as one of Vermont's architectural treasures. It is listed on the National Register of Historic Places. The magnificent Palladian window over the front entrance, and many other details are the result of design by Lavius Fillmore, the famous colonial architect from Connecticut who also designed some of Vermont's finest churches in Bennington and Middlebury. The house is also well known for several beautifully-preserved early wall paintings, rare examples of the colonial practice of using murals to imitate wallpaper, which was often unavailable in early Vermont. They are featured in a book called Early Vermont Wall Paintings by R. L. McGrath:

Probably the earliest example in Vermont of the technique of painting on plaster in "distemper" (i.e. tempera) occurs in the Gov. Galusha House in Center Shaftsbury. The house was completed in 1809. The Galusha House overmantel ... is the work of a highly skilled artist whose bold floral designs fill the entire surface of the chimney breast and extend as well to the adjoining walls of the room. The elegant floral pattern is executed free hand in dark outline against a dull green background.

In 2010, the homestead and its farmland were protected by covenants between Galusha descendants and the Vermont Land Trust.

Party political offices
Preceded by Israel Smith	Democratic-Republican nominee for Governor of Vermont; 1809, 1810, 1811, 1812, 1813, 1814, 1815, 1816, 1817, 1818, 1819	Succeeded by Richard Skinner
Political offices
Preceded by Isaac Tichenor	Governor of Vermont; 1809–1813	Succeeded by Martin Chittenden
Preceded by Martin Chittenden	Governor of Vermont; 1815–1820	Succeeded by Richard Skinner
