= Martin Chittenden =

American politician

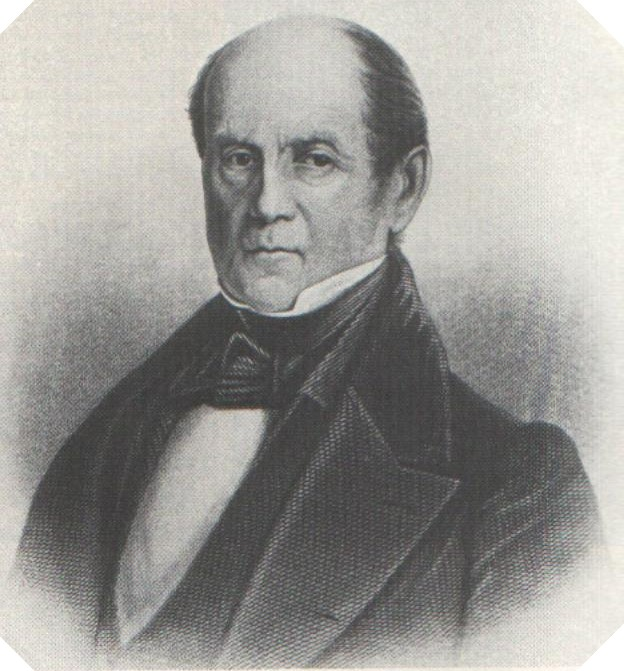

7th Governor of Vermont
- In office October 23, 1813 – October 14, 1815
- Preceded by: Jonas Galusha
- Succeeded by: Jonas Galusha

Member of the U.S. House of Representatives from Vermont's 4th district
- In office March 4, 1803 – March 3, 1813
- Preceded by: District established
- Succeeded by: District abolished

Member of the Vermont House of Representatives
- In office 1790–1796

Personal details
- Born: March 12, 1763 Salisbury, Colony of Connecticut, British America
- Died: September 5, 1840 (aged 77) Williston, Vermont, U.S.
- Party: Federalist
- Spouse: Anna Bentley
- Children: 12
- Education: Dartmouth College

Martin Chittenden (March 12, 1763 – September 5, 1840) was an American politician from Vermont. He served as a United States representative from 1803 to 1813 and as the seventh governor of Vermont from 1813 to 1815, during a crucial portion of the War of 1812.

== Biography ==
Chittenden was born in Salisbury in the Colony of Connecticut to Thomas Chittenden and Elizabeth Meigs Chittenden. He moved to Vermont in 1776 in the wake of the founding of the town of Williston by his father Thomas Chittenden. Martin Chittenden attended Mares School and, in 1789, graduated from Dartmouth College in Hanover, New Hampshire.

After graduating from Dartmouth College, Chittenden moved to Jericho, Vermont, and was involved in agricultural and mercantile pursuits. He was appointed Justice of the Peace in October 1789, and in 1791 he served as a delegate to the state convention that ratified the United States Constitution. He served as aide-de-camp to Lieutenant Governor Peter Olcott in 1790, and from 1790 until 1793 he served as clerk of the county court of Chittenden County, Vermont.

Chittenden served as a member of the Vermont House of Representatives from 1790 until 1796. He was judge of the Chittenden County Court from 1793 until 1795, and served as chief justice of the Chittenden County Court from 1796 until 1813. He was the first census collector for Chittenden County.

He was appointed a captain in the Vermont Militia's 1st Regiment, 7th Division in 1793, and promoted to lieutenant colonel and regimental commander in 1794. In 1799 he was promoted to brigadier general (later major general) and commander of the 3rd Division, a post he held until 1803.

Chittenden was elected as a Federalist candidate to the Eighth Congress and was reelected to the Ninth Congress, Tenth Congress, Eleventh Congress and Twelfth Congress, serving from March 4, 1803, until March 3, 1813.

He was elected Governor of Vermont in 1813, replacing his brother-in-law, Jonas Galusha, who was also his successor in the post. Chittenden served as governor from October 23, 1813, until October 14, 1815. He was the last Federalist governor of Vermont. During his term as governor, fighting between American and British forces was fierce on the current United States–Canada border. In November 1813, conscious of the British encroachment on Plattsburgh, New York, members of the Vermont militia asked Chittenden to let them intervene. Chittenden declined, though the militia leaders claimed that this was the result of pressure from his advisers.

After his retirement from elected office, Chittenden served as town representative of Williston and as a probate judge from 1821 until 1823.

== Family life ==
Chittenden's father, Thomas Chittenden, was the first governor of Vermont.

He was the brother in law of Matthew Lyon and Jonas Galusha. Lyon married Martin Chittenden's sister Beulah (1764–1824), and Jonas Galusha's four wives (all of whom predeceased him) included Chittenden's sister Mary (1758–1794).

Martin Chittenden was the uncle of Matthew Lyons' son Chittenden Lyon, a United States Representative from Kentucky.

== Death and burial ==
Chittenden died on September 5, 1840, in Williston, Vermont, in 1840. He is interred at the Thomas Chittenden Cemetery in Williston.

Party political offices
Preceded by Isaac Tichenor	Federalist nominee for Governor of Vermont; 1811, 1812, 1813, 1814, 1815	Succeeded by Samuel Strong
U.S. House of Representatives
Preceded by none (first)	U.S. Representative from Vermont's 4th district 1803–1813	Succeeded by Charles Rich
Political offices
Preceded by Jonas Galusha	Governor of Vermont; October 23, 1813 – October 14, 1815	Succeeded by Jonas Galusha
