= Nathaniel N. Whiting =

Nathaniel N. Whiting (June 19, 1792 – June 18, 1872) was a Baptist Preacher in New York. He was a professor of Biblical Languages at Lexington College and worked on Bible translation. He supported the work of William Miller, but shied away from fixing a particular date for Christ's return. For a time he was editor of The Williamsburg Daily Gazette. It is said that he was the first man who ever reported a sermon for a newspaper.

== Works ==
- The Good News of Our Lord Jesus, the Anointed, from the Critical Greek of Tittmann (1849)
- Origin, Nature, and Influence of Neology
