= William Chamberlain (politician) =

American politician (1755-1828)

Member of the U.S. House of Representatives from Vermont's 3rd district
- In office March 4, 1803 – March 3, 1805
- Preceded by: District established
- Succeeded by: James Fisk
- In office March 4, 1809 – March 3, 1811
- Preceded by: James Fisk
- Succeeded by: James Fisk

4th Lieutenant Governor of Vermont
- In office October 23, 1813 – October 14, 1815
- Governor: Martin Chittenden
- Preceded by: Paul Brigham
- Succeeded by: Paul Brigham

Member of the Vermont House of Representatives
- In office 1785; 1787–1796; 1805; 1808

Personal details
- Born: April 27, 1755 Hopkinton, Province of Massachusetts Bay, British America
- Died: September 27, 1828 (aged 73) Peacham, Vermont, U.S.
- Party: Federalist Party (United States)
- Spouse: Jame E."Jenny" Eastman
- Children: 8
- Profession: Politician, Teacher, Farmer

William Chamberlain (April 27, 1755 – September 27, 1828) was an American politician from Vermont. He served as a United States representative and as the fourth lieutenant governor of Vermont.

== Biography ==
Chamberlain was born in Hopkinton in the Province of Massachusetts Bay to Samuel and Martha Mellen Chamberlain. He attended the common schools and worked as a school teacher in Hopkinton until he moved with his father to Loudon in the Province of New Hampshire in 1774. He served as a sergeant during the American Revolutionary War and took part in the Battles of Lexington and Concord and the invasion of Canada. He later engaged in land surveying and farming. He moved to Peacham, Vermont, in 1780. Engaging in politics, he was the clerk of the proprietors of the town the same year. He was town clerk from 1785 to 1797.

Chamberlain served as a member of the Vermont House of Representatives in 1785, from 1787 to 1796, in 1805 and in 1808. He also served as a Justice of the Peace from 1786 to 1796 and as a delegate to the state constitutional convention in 1791. He was a member of the Vermont's Governor's Council from 1796 until 1803. He was a brigadier general of the Vermont militia in 1794 and was promoted to major general in 1799.

He was the assistant judge of orange County in 1795 and chief judge of Caledonia County from 1796 until 1803. He served as secretary of the board of trustees of the Caledonia County Grammar School from 1795 until 1812, and as president of the board of trustees from 1813 until 1828.

In 1801, Chamberlain was the Federalist nominee to fill the vacancy in the U.S. Senate caused by the resignation of Elijah Paine; he lost to Stephen R. Bradley. He was later elected to the Eighth Congress, serving from March 4, 1803, until March 3, 1805, and to the Eleventh Congress, serving from March 4, 1809, until March 3, 1811.

After serving in Congress, he served as the Lieutenant Governor of Vermont from 1813 until 1815. He was a delegate to the state constitutional convention in 1814.

== Personal life ==
Chamberlain married Jane E. "Jenny" Eastman on March 15, 1781. They had seven children together.

Chamberlain died on September 27, 1828, in Peacham, Caledonia County, Vermont. He is interred at Peacham Village Cemetery in Peacham.

== Spelling of name ==
He signed his name "Chamberlin" and his name appears that way in some official records and other documents.

Party political offices
First	Federalist nominee for Lieutenant Governor of Vermont; 1813, 1814, 1815, 1816, 1817, 1818, 1819	Succeeded by None
U.S. House of Representatives
Preceded by District created	Member of the U.S. House of Representatives from Vermont's 3rd congressional district 1803-1805	Succeeded by James Fisk
Preceded by James Fisk	Member of the U.S. House of Representatives from Vermont's 3rd congressional district 1809-1811	Succeeded by James Fisk
Political offices
Preceded by James Fisk	Lieutenant Governor of Vermont; 1813–1815	Succeeded by James Fisk
