= Benjamin Swan (Vermont politician) =

Vermont State Treasurer (1762–1839)

Vermont State Treasurer
- In office 1800–1833
- Preceded by: Samuel Mattocks
- Succeeded by: Augustine Clarke

Personal details
- Born: November 12, 1762 Worcester, Massachusetts, U.S.
- Died: August 11, 1839 (aged 76) Woodstock, Vermont, U.S.
- Resting place: River Street Cemetery, Woodstock, Vermont, U.S.
- Spouse: Lucy Gay Swan
- Relations: John Webster; Timothy Swan; Lewis R. Morris; Jonathan Hunt; Jonathan Hunt
- Children: Benjamin Swan; William Swan; Lucy Swan; William Swan; Eleanor Swan; Mary Swan
- Parent(s): William Swan; Lavina (Keyes) Swan
- Profession: Merchant; Banker; Politician
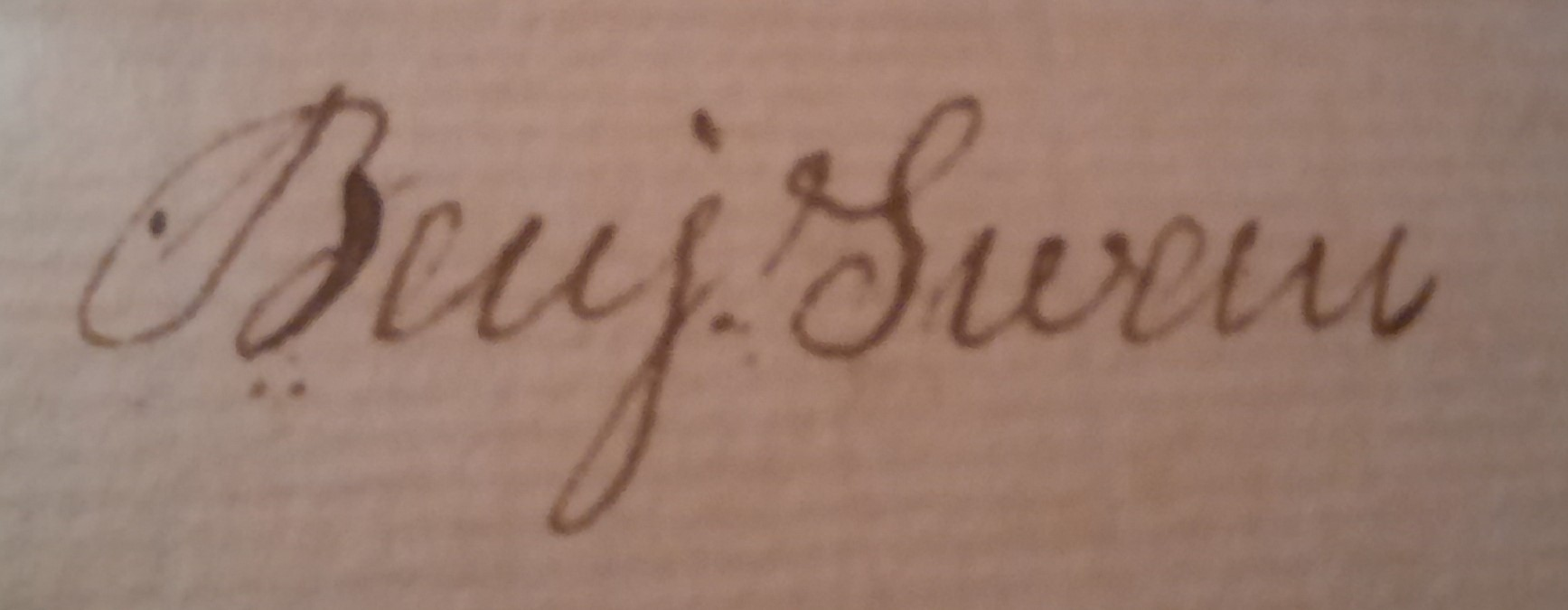
- Signature

Benjamin Swan (November 12, 1762 – April 11, 1839) was an American merchant, banker and politician. He was an important political figure in Vermont and served as state treasurer.

== Early life ==
Swan was born in Worcester, Massachusetts, on November 12, 1762, the son of William Swan and Lavina (Keyes) Swan. He trained as a merchant in Worcester, Boston, and Montreal before moving to Woodstock, Vermont, in 1791.

== Business career ==
Swan continued his mercantile career and was also successful as a banker, including serving on the board of directors of the Vermont State Bank. He was also an owner or partner in several ventures, including a pearl ash factory.

== Political career ==
A Federalist, Swan served in local offices including postmaster. He served as Justice of the Peace when holders of that office still heard court cases. He was also active in the militia, and achieved the rank of major.

In 1796, Swan was appointed county clerk, an office in which he served until his death. Swan was elected Vermont state treasurer in 1800. He served until 1833, and is the state's longest-tenured treasurer.

After years of running virtually unopposed, even after the demise of the Federalist Party, in 1833 Swan narrowly lost his bid for reelection to Augustine Clarke, 19,661 (50.8%) to 19,056 (49.2%). Swan was a Mason, and Clarke was the candidate of the Anti-Masonic Party, so his win demonstrated the strength of that third party movement.

== Death and burial ==
Swan died in Woodstock on April 11, 1839. He is buried at River Street Cemetery in Woodstock.

== House ==
The Major Benjamin Swan home at 37 Elm St. in Woodstock was constructed in the mid-1790s. It is a local landmark, and is a privately owned residence.

== Family ==
In 1804 Swan married Lucy Gay. Their children included: Benjamin (1805–1852); William (1807–1811); Lucy (1810–1892); William (died 1816); Eleanor (died 1817); and Mary (1813–1867).

Swan's brother Timothy Swan was an eccentric composer and poet who lived at Suffield, Connecticut. Swan's sister Lavina married Vermont Lieutenant Governor Jonathan Hunt of the prominent Hunt family of Vermont. Swan's nephew was U.S. Congressman Jonathan Hunt.

Political offices
Preceded by Samuel Mattocks	Vermont State Treasurer; 1800–1833	Succeeded by Augustine Clarke
