= Senator Bloomer =

Senator Bloomer may refer to:

- Asa S. Bloomer (1891–1963), Vermont State Senate
- John H. Bloomer (1930–1995), Vermont State Senate
- Robert A. Bloomer (1921–1999), Vermont State Senate
