= 1926 Vermont gubernatorial election =

- November 2, 1926
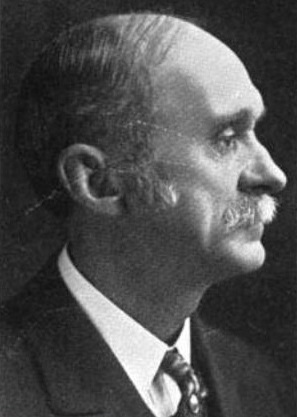

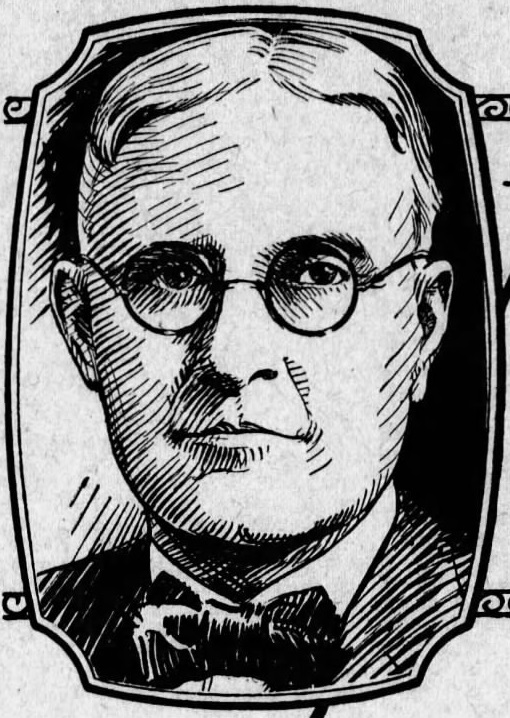
Nominee	John E. Weeks	Herbert C. Comings
Party	Republican	Democratic
Popular vote	44,564	28,659
Percentage	60.85%	39.13%
- Weeks: 50–60% 60–70% 70–80% 80–90% 90-100% Comings: 40–50% 50–60% 60–70% 70–80% No Vote/Data
Governor before election
Franklin S. Billings
Republican
Elected Governor
John E. Weeks
Republican

The 1926 Vermont gubernatorial election took place on November 2, 1926. Incumbent Republican Franklin S. Billings, per the "Mountain Rule", did not run for re-election to a second term as Governor of Vermont. Republican candidate John E. Weeks defeated Democratic candidate Herbert C. Comings to succeed him.

== Republican primary ==
=== Results ===
Republican primary results
Party	Candidate	Votes	%	±%
Republican	John E. Weeks	24,160	48.0	
Republican	Max L. Powell	14,946	29.7	
Republican	Walter K. Farnsworth	11,185	22.2	
Republican	Other	10	0.0	
Total votes		50,301	100	

== Democratic primary ==
=== Results ===
Democratic primary results
Party	Candidate	Votes	%	±%
Democratic	Herbert C. Comings	2,209	99.2	
Democratic	Other	18	0.8	
Total votes		2,227	100	

== General election ==
=== Candidates ===
- John E. Weeks, Vermont Commissioner of Public Welfare
- Herbert C. Comings, former Vermont Commissioner of Finance

=== Results ===
1926 Vermont gubernatorial election
Party	Candidate	Votes	%	±%
Republican	John E. Weeks	44,564	60.85	
Democratic	Herbert C. Comings	26,373	36.01	
Prohibition	Herbert C. Comings	1,282	1.75	
Citizens	Herbert C. Comings	981	1.34	
Republican	Herbert C. Comings	15	0.02	
Other	Herbert C. Comings	8	0.01	
Total	Herbert C. Comings	28,659	39.13	
N/A	Other	13	0.02	
Total votes		73,236	100	
