= Evergreen Cemetery (Rutland, Vermont) =

Cemetery in Rutland County, Vermont

Coordinates: 43°36′15″N 73°00′25″W

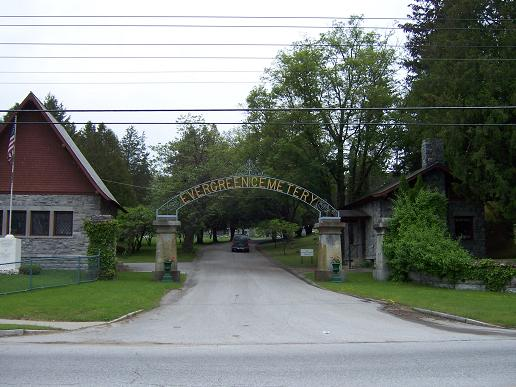
- Main gate of Evergreen Cemetery in Rutland, Vermont
- Interactive map of Evergreen Cemetery

Details
- Established: October 16, 1861
- Location: 465 West Street, Rutland, Vermont, US

Evergreen Cemetery is a burial ground located in Rutland City, Vermont, United States. It is managed by the Rutland Evergreen Cemetery Association. Evergreen was founded as Pine Hill Cemetery in 1861, and the name was subsequently changed.

== History ==
Pine Hill Cemetery was dedicated on 16 October 1861, with William A. Burnett as the first superintendent. The site took its name from the location where it was constructed, Rutland's Pine Hill, and was later changed to Evergreen Cemetery. Initial construction included walkways, a vault, a front wall, and a gateway of marble. In addition, early construction included seven fountains, one of which (in Section C) is still working.

== Description ==
Evergreen Cemetery was constructed on a 45-acre site, and has been expanded by purchase and donation. Its entrance is located at 465 West Street in Rutland City, near the border with Rutland town and across the street from the Rutland Town Hall. designed in the rural cemetery tradition, the location was originally a pine forest and retains many aspects of a wood or grove. It is enclosed by walls of varying heights, many of which are made of local marble, and numerous vines and flowering shrubs enhance the cemetery's appearance. Winding paths and roads traverse the location as they climb a series of knolls.

== Notable burials ==
Several individuals prominent in business, politics, the arts, and other fields are buried at Evergreen Cemetery. These include:

Benjamin Alvord, Union Army Brigadier General
James Barrett, associate justice of the Vermont Supreme Court
Horace Henry Baxter, businessman and adjutant general of the Vermont Militia
Hilda Belcher, painter
Asa S. Bloomer, Speaker of the Vermont House of Representatives and President pro tempore of the Vermont Senate
John H. Bloomer, president pro tempore of the Vermont Senate
Robert A. Bloomer, president pro tempore of the Vermont Senate
Fred M. Butler, associate justice of the Vermont Supreme Court
Frank H. Chapman, U.S. Marshal for the District of Vermont
Percival W. Clement, governor of Vermont
John J. Daley, Lieutenant governor of Vermont
Julia C. R. Dorr, poet
Seneca M. Dorr, president pro tempore of the Vermont Senate
Edith Kellogg Dunton, novelist
Walter C. Dunton, associate justice of the Vermont Supreme Court
Fred A. Field, United States Marshal for the District of Vermont
Solomon Foot, U.S. Senator
John A. M. Hinsman, president pro tempore of the Vermont Senate
George T. Hodges, U.S. Congressman
Silas H. Hodges, commissioner of the U.S. Patent Office
Frederic Williams Hopkins, adjutant general of the Vermont Militia
Lawrence C. Jones, Vermont Attorney General
Charles Herbert Joyce, U.S. Congressman
Harvey R. Kingsley, president pro tempore of the Vermont Senate
John A. Mead, governor of Vermont
William T. Nichols, Union Army officer and businessman
John B. Page, governor of Vermont
Robert Pierpoint, Lieutenant governor of Vermont
John Prout, associate justice of the Vermont Supreme Court
Edward H. Ripley, Union Army officer
William Y. W. Ripley, Civil War Medal of Honor Recipient
Charles Manley Smith, governor of Vermont
Ellen M. Cyr Smith, author and educator
Milford K. Smith, associate justice of the Vermont Supreme Court
Bert L. Stafford, mayor of Rutland
Robert Stafford, governor of Vermont and U.S. Senator
Charles A. Thompson, Civil War Medal of Honor Recipient
Charles K. Williams. governor of Vermont
Leonard F. Wing, U.S. Army major general
