= Carroll L. Coburn =

American politician

President pro tempore of the Vermont State Senate
- In office 1947–1949
- Preceded by: John A. M. Hinsman
- Succeeded by: Asa S. Bloomer

Member of the Vermont Senate
- In office 1943–1949 Serving with Raymond B. Daniels, Ralph W. Putnam (1943); Thomas H. Cave, J. Willsie Brisbin (1945); J. Willsie Brisbin, Mildred Hayden (1947)
- Preceded by: Raymond B. Daniels, Ralph W. Putnam, Joseph H. Denny
- Succeeded by: Mildred Hayden, Merrill W. Harris, Donald W. Smith
- Constituency: Washington County

Member of the Vermont House of Representatives
- In office 1949–1951
- Preceded by: Andrew Christiansen
- Succeeded by: George Sibley
- Constituency: East Montpelier
- In office 1939–1943
- Preceded by: Roy H. Sibley
- Succeeded by: Ralph H. Paine
- Constituency: East Montpelier

Personal details
- Born: February 23, 1902 East Montpelier, U.S.
- Died: April 10, 1975 (aged 68) Berlin, Vermont, U.S.
- Resting place: Poplar Hill Cemetery, North Montpelier, Vermont, U.S.
- Party: Republican
- Spouse: Edith Lillian Ellis (m. 1932)
- Children: 3
- Education: Tufts University (B.S., 1930)
- Occupation: Farmer; Staff, Vermont Employment Security Department; President, Vermont State Employees Association

Carroll L. Coburn (February 23, 1907 – April 10, 1975) was a Vermont farmer and politician who served as President of the Vermont State Senate.

== Biography ==
Carroll Leander Coburn was born in East Montpelier, Vermont on February 23, 1907. He was educated at Plainfield High School and Goddard Seminary, and received a Bachelor of Science degree from Tufts University in 1930.

A Republican, Coburn owned and operated Twin Elms Farm in East Montpelier and served in local offices, including school board member.

Coburn served in the Vermont House of Representatives from 1939 to 1943.

In 1942 Coburn was elected to the Vermont Senate. He served three terms, 1943 to 1949, and was Senate President from 1947 to 1949.

Coburn was again elected to the Vermont House in 1948, and served one term, 1949 to 1951.

In 1949 Coburn sold his farm and joined the staff of the Vermont Employment Security Department, where he remained until his 1971 retirement. During his tenure with VESD Coburn served as President of the Vermont State Employees Association.

Coburn died in Berlin, Vermont on April 10, 1975. He was buried at Poplar Hill Cemetery, North Montpelier.

Political offices
Preceded by John A. M. Hinsman	President pro tempore of the Vermont State Senate; 1947–1949	Succeeded by Asa S. Bloomer
