= Dwinell =

Dwinell is a surname. Notable people with the surname include:

- Frank A. Dwinell (1848–1928), American businessman and politician
- Justin Dwinell (1785–1850), American lawyer and politician
- Lane Dwinell (1906–1997), American politician
