= Senator Weston =

Senator Weston may refer to:

- Byron Weston (1832–1898), Massachusetts State Senate
- Carol Weston (politician) (fl. 2000s–2010s), Maine State Senate
- Kent Weston (fl. 2020s), North Dakota State Senate
- William Weston (Vermont politician) (1803–1875), Vermont State Senate
