= Senator Wilkerson =

Senator Wilkerson may refer to:

- Dianne Wilkerson (born 1955), Massachusetts State Senate
- Dick Wilkerson (born 1943), Oklahoma State Senate

== See also ==
- Senator Wilkinson (disambiguation)
