= Senator Dwinell =

Senator Dwinell may refer to:

- Frank A. Dwinell (1848–1928), Vermont State Senate
- Lane Dwinell (1906–1997), New Hampshire State Senate
- William S. Dwinnell (1862–1930), Minnesota State Senate
