= Senator Vilas =

Senator Vilas may refer to:

== Members of the United States Senate ==
- William Freeman Vilas (1840–1908), U.S. Senator from Wisconsin from 1891 to 1897

== United States state senate members ==
- Joseph Vilas (1832–1905), Wisconsin State Senate
- Levi Baker Vilas (1811–1879), Vermont State Senate
- Martin S. Vilas (1870–1953), Vermont State Senate
