= Senator Edgerton =

Senator Edgarton may refer to:

- Alfred Peck Edgerton (1813–1897), Ohio State Senate
- Alonzo J. Edgerton (1827–1896), U.S. Senator from Minnesota
- Edward H. Edgerton (1863–1934), Vermont State Senate
