= Bristol Bill =

American criminal (c. 1802 –1882)

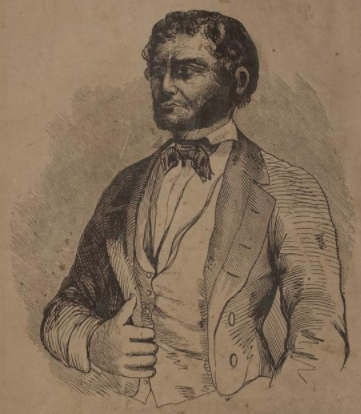
Bristol Bill from the cover of his 1850 biography

Bristol Bill (c. 1802 –1882) was an Anglo-American burglar and counterfeiter. His most well known crimes include the 1845 Poughkeepsie Barge Robbery, involvement in the 1849 Drury Torpedo Case, and the 1850 stabbing of Vermont State's Attorney Bliss N. Davis at a sentencing hearing on counterfeiting charges.

== Early life ==
Early details of Bill's life are sketchy. In 1850, George Thompson published a pamphlet titled "Life and Exploits of Bristol Bill", which traces his youth and career up to that point. From the 1850 Thompson account, Bill was born in about 1802 and his early life was spent in Liverpool, London, Bristol (from where Bill got his moniker) and other large cities in the United Kingdom. Bill's real name is not revealed, and his father is supposed to have one time been a member of the British Parliament. Bill himself, Thompson writes, attended Eton College. Thompson reports that he later spent several years in the UK involved in petty crime before he was arrested and sentenced to transportation to Botany Bay. After five years, Thompson writes, he escaped Australia by swimming to a boat off shore. He arrived in New York, and continued his previous career of crime.

== Name and nicknames ==
A number of criminals took the moniker Bristol Bill or English Bill. It is unclear if there is any connection between these individuals. In 1931, a man called Bristol Bill was convicted of highway robbery under the name of George Wesson in Winchester, UK. In 1845, a man called English Bill was arrested in New York for robbery under the name John Miller. In 1849, a man called English Bill was arrested in Baltimore for escaping the Moyamensing prison in Philadelphia under the name William Barry. The most common aliases of Bills were William Warburton and William Darlington. William's companion, Margaret O'Connor, claimed in 1851 that Bill's true name was William Eady.

== Early career in America ==
Bill soon came to know some of the leading criminals in New York, including Joseph C. Ashley, Samuel Drury, Catherine Davenport, Jim "Cupid" Downer, William Parkinson, James Honeyman, Dick Collard, James Arlington Bennet, and William "One-Eyed" Thompson. With some in this group, Bill became involved in the 1845 Poughkeepsie Barge robbery led by Honeyman, who was already famous for his part in the 1831 City Bank of New York theft. In 1847, Bill was again a perpetrator of a famous burglary, this time of the jewelry stores of Currier & Trott and of Widdefield & Company.in Boston. In 1847, Bill began his connection with counterfeiter, Margaret O'Connor, and pimp, James Edgerton, and Bill was staying with Edgerton when he was arrested, although he was soon released. O'Connor may have been the same person as another noted counterfeiter, Ann Nugent. In 1848, under the name William Darlington, Bill was arrested along with Charles Garret, Joseph Murray, and John Clark in 1948.

== Drury torpedo affair ==
In 1849, Samuel Drury and Lawyer Thomas Warner were involved in a dispute, and Drury sent a bomb to Warner, which did not succeed in killing the man. New York Police Gazette editor George Wilkes decided he wanted to solve the case and hired Bill and One-Eyed Thompson, whom Drury trusted, to trick Drury into confession. In order to get close to Drury, Thompson engaged with Drury's son in counterfeiting. While this was successful, once in jail, Drury sought revenge on Thompson by getting him arrested on counterfeiting charges. Among those who took the stand was an old friend of Bill's, Catherine Davenport. On the stand, Davenport claimed that she had two children by Bill. Many other people testified, including O'Connor and eventual Bristol Bill associate Christian Meadows, and ultimately Thompson was acquitted.

== Arrest and assault on Davis ==
Bill was reported to have moved to California, but ended up in Vermont. In the fall of 1849, he moved to Groton, Vermont to the farm of Ephram Law with a woman many then believed to be his wife, Margaret O'Connor. There he, O'Connor, and Christian Meadows set about planning more counterfeiting and bank robberies. However, Thompson discovered their whereabouts and traded this information to the police. Under the name William H. Warburton, Bill was arrested in Groton for burglary and owning materials which can be used to counterfeit bank bills. Along with Bill were arrested Margaret O'Conner, Christian and Isabells Meadows, Law, and two others. Soon after, Law died in custody. At the trial, the two other accomplices turned state's evidence and Bill and Christian Meadows were convicted.

During his sentencing in the St. Johnsbury courtroom, he stabbed the prosecuting attorney, Bliss N. Davis, with a knife he had smuggled from dinner. Davis later recovered. In August, Bill made a failed attempt to escape jail. That same month, O'Conner escaped from the New York City Prison, but was recaptured on board a ship at dock shortly before it set sail for Liverpool, UK. Later that year, Bill claimed that he was being whipped in prison, but this claim was denied. O'Connor died of dysentery on September 15, 1851. Meadows was pardoned out of prison in 1853. In 1855, it was reported that Bill tried again to escape prison, but this report was denied. It was also reported that year that Bill was pardoned, but this was denied as well. In January 1856, Bill's sentence for counterfeiting was up and he was sentenced to seven more years for his assault of Davis. In 1859 it was again reported that Bill escaped, and in this occasion was shot and killed while fleeing, but this was again denied. In December of that year he was pardoned by Vermont Governor Hiland Hall.

== Freedom ==
Out of jail, Bill was arrested in January 1860 in Providence, Rhode Island for breaking into a grocery store and stealing a barrel of flour. Bill jumped bail and was arrested in August in Boston and returned to Rhode Island. He was again arrested for robbing a house in Providence in April 1861.

At one point during this period, going by the name William H. Warburton, Bill was in Providence staying with James Edgeton, who himself had a history of bank robbing. The pair decided to rob the Westminster Bank. On the night of the planned heist, before it began, Bill was arrested as a suspect for a grocery robbery in the possession of burglar's tools. Bill was later released in exchange for cooperation with the Boston Police.

== Later career and rumors of death ==
In February 1865, he was reported again arrested on suspicion of burglary and in possession of the tools of the crime, then in Marietta, Ohio. It is unclear if crimes ascribed to Bill after this point were committed by the same person, as in response to these reports, newspapers reported that the original Bristol Bill had died years before. In 1866, the Gore Bank of Galt in Ontario was robbed by a man claiming going by the name Henry Parker and thought to be Bristol Bill. At the time, this crime was connected with the Fenian crisis.

Multiple dates for Bill's death are given. In 1865, the St Johnsbury Caledonian, newspaper from near his former home in Groton, Vermont, reported Bill was already dead. An 1889 History of the police force in Providence reported that Bill died at the age of 80, which would have been around 1882.

== Legacy ==
Bill was memorialized as a character in the 1872 play, "Escaped from Sing Sing" and again in the 1875 play, "Broke Jail". Bill's tools and an image of Bill were a central feature at the 1873 opening of the New York City "Detective's Museum" at 600 Broadway.
