= Senator Howe (disambiguation) =

Timothy O. Howe (1816–1883) was a U.S. Senator from Wisconsin from 1861 to 1879. Senator Howe may also refer to:

- Carleton G. Howe (1898–1993), Vermont State Senate
- George Howe (attorney) (1824–1888), Vermont State Senate
- Jeff Howe (born 1959), Minnesota State Senate
- John Howe (Minnesota politician) (born 1963), Minnesota State Senate
- Richard C. Howe (born 1924), Utah State Senate
