= Max L. Powell =

American attorney & politician (1869–1941)

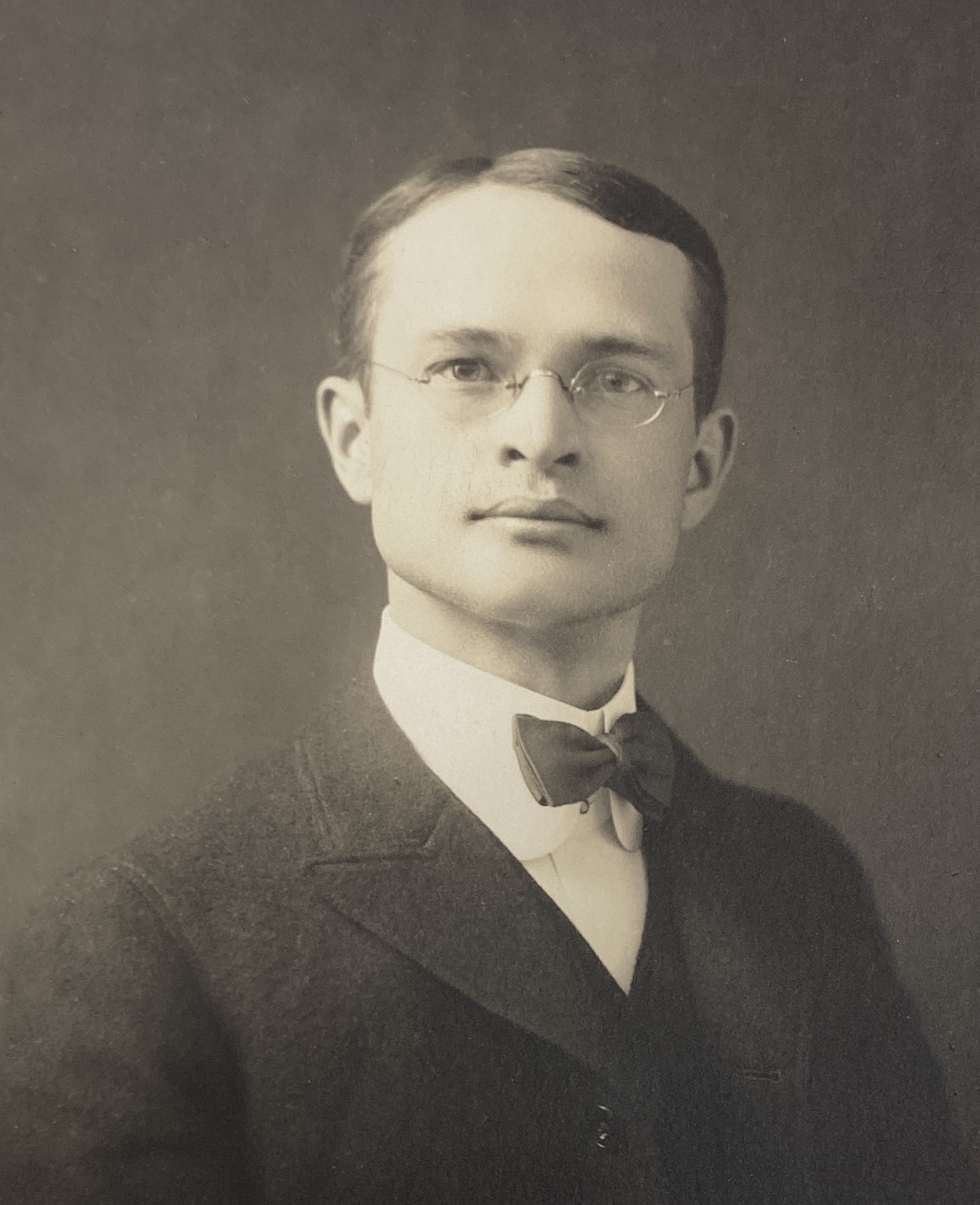
- Powell in 1900

President of the Vermont Senate
- In office 1915–1917
- Preceded by: Frederick H. Babbitt
- Succeeded by: William R. Fairchild
- In office 1910–1912
- Preceded by: Ernest Willard Gibson
- Succeeded by: Frederick H. Babbitt

Member of the Vermont Senate from Chittenden County
- In office 1915–1919 Serving with Henry B. Shaw, Frank E. Blake, Elon O. Martin
- Preceded by: F. E. Bigwood, E. W. Henry, E. C. Mower, J. J. Quinlan
- Succeeded by: Frank S. Jackson, Sherman R. Moulton (resigned, February 1919), Henry W. Tracy, Martin S. Vilas
- In office 1910–1912 Serving with George M. Norton, John A. Smith
- Preceded by: Albert L. Bingham, James E. Kennedy, Irving T. Hobart
- Succeeded by: F. E. Bigwood, E. W. Henry, E. C. Mower, J. J. Quinlan

Secretary of the Vermont Senate
- In office 1896–1902
- Preceded by: George M. Powers
- Succeeded by: Walter K. Farnsworth

Vermont Secretary of Civil and Military Affairs
- In office 1894–1896
- Governor: Urban A. Woodbury
- Preceded by: Joseph H. Goulding
- Succeeded by: Joseph W. Sault

Personal details
- Born: April 26, 1869 Richford, Vermont, U.S.
- Died: March 2, 1941 (aged 71) Burlington, Vermont, U.S.
- Resting place: Lakeview Cemetery, Burlington, Vermont
- Party: Republican
- Spouse: Lois (McBride) Powell (m. 1980-1941, his death)
- Relations: E. Henry Powell (father)
- Children: 2
- Education: University of Vermont (AB, MA); University of Geneva (attended)
- Profession: Lawyer

Max L. Powell (April 26, 1869 – March 2, 1941) was a Vermont politician who served as President of the Vermont Senate.

== Biography ==
Max Leon Powell, the son of E. Henry Powell was born in Richford, Vermont on April 26, 1869. He graduated from the University of Vermont in 1889 and studied law. Powell also studied at the University of Geneva, and received a Master of Arts degree from the University of Vermont in 1907.

Powell began to practice law in Burlington in 1892. In addition, he became involved in several local businesses, including owning and operating the Van Ness House and the Hotel Vermont hotels. He was also active in the insurance business as a principal of Powell & Marks in Burlington. Powell also served in the Vermont National Guard, attaining the rank of Captain on the headquarters staff of the 1st Vermont Infantry Regiment, the state's main post-Civil War troop organization.

A Republican, Powell served as Deputy Auditor of Accounts during his father's term as Vermont Auditor of Accounts. He was Assistant Clerk of the Vermont House of Representatives from 1892 to 1893. From 1894 to 1896 he was Secretary of Civil and Military Affairs (chief assistant) to Governor Urban A. Woodbury.

Powell served as Secretary of the Vermont State Senate from 1896 to 1902. In 1902 he was an unsuccessful candidate for the Republican nomination for State Auditor.

In 1910 he was elected to the State Senate, and chosen by his peers to serve as Senate President pro tempore. In 1914 he was again elected to the State Senate, and again selected to serve as Senate President.

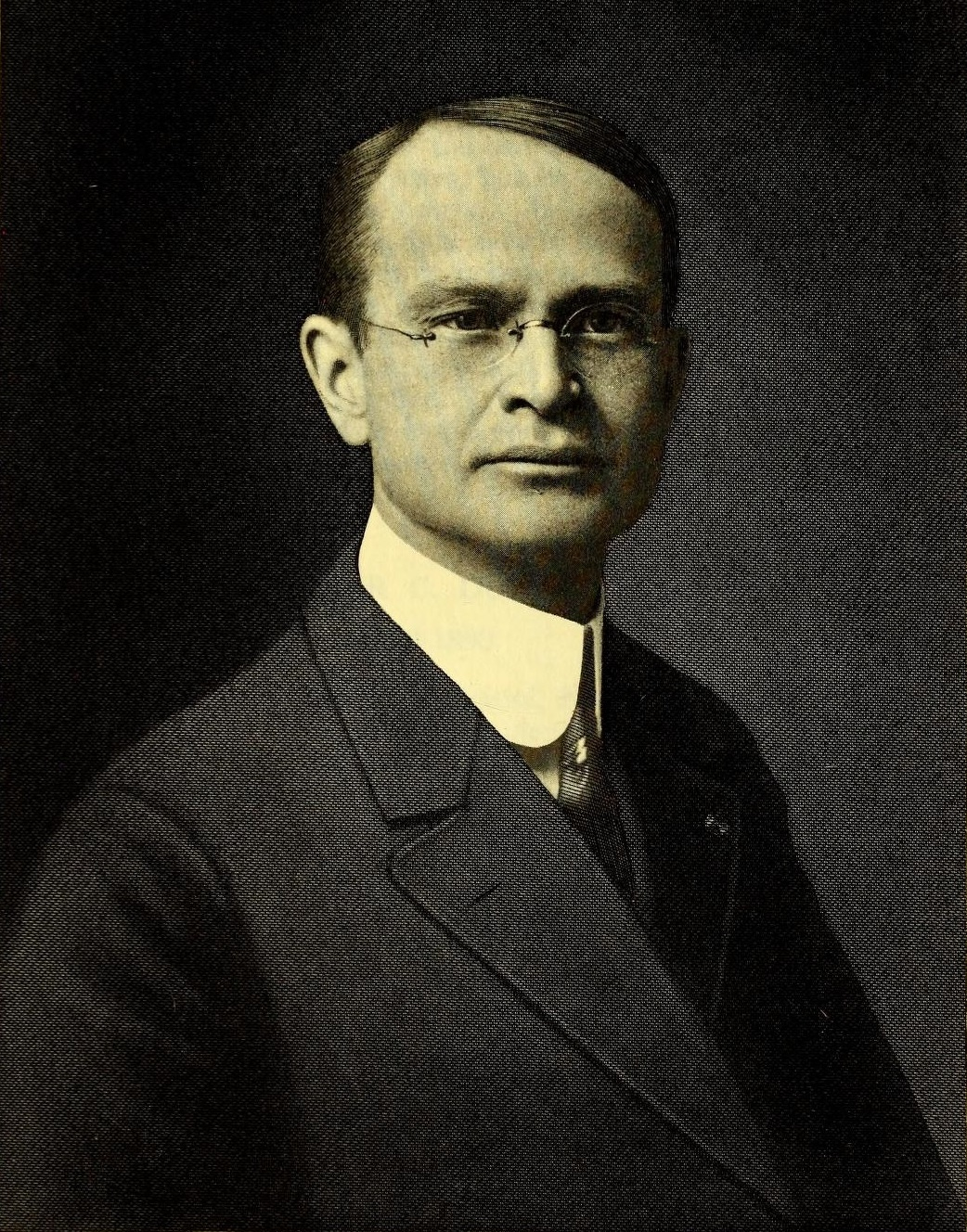
Powell in Volume V (1923) of Vermont, The Green Mountain State

In 1914 and 1926 Powell was an unsuccessful candidate for the Republican nomination for Governor.

Max Powell died in Burlington, Vermont on March 2, 1941. He was buried in Burlington's Lakeview Cemetery.

Political offices
Preceded by Ernest W. Gibson Sr.	President pro tempore of the Vermont State Senate; 1910 – 1911	Succeeded by Frederick H. Babbitt
Preceded by Frederick H. Babbitt	President pro tempore of the Vermont State Senate; 1915 – 1916	Succeeded by William R. Fairchild
