= Senator Babbitt =

Senator Babbitt may refer to:

- Elijah Babbitt (1795–1887), Pennsylvania State Senate
- Frederick H. Babbitt (1859–1931), Vermont State Senate
