= Governor Mead =

Governor Mead may refer to:

- Albert E. Mead (1861–1913), 5th Governor of Washington
- John A. Mead (1841–1920), 53rd Governor of Vermont
- Matt Mead (born 1962), 32nd Governor of Wyoming
