= Senator Wilkins =

Senator Wilkins may refer to:

- Beriah Wilkins (1846–1905), Ohio State Senate
- Edness Kimball Wilkins (1896−1980), Wyoming State Senate
- George Wilkins (Vermont politician) (1817–1902), Vermont State Senate
- Hank Wilkins (born 1954), Arkansas State Senate
- William Wilkins (American politician) (1779–1865), U.S. Senator from Pennsylvania

== See also ==
- James W. Wilkin (1762–1845), New York State Senate
- Senator Wilkinson (disambiguation)
