= Alfred A. Hall =

American politician

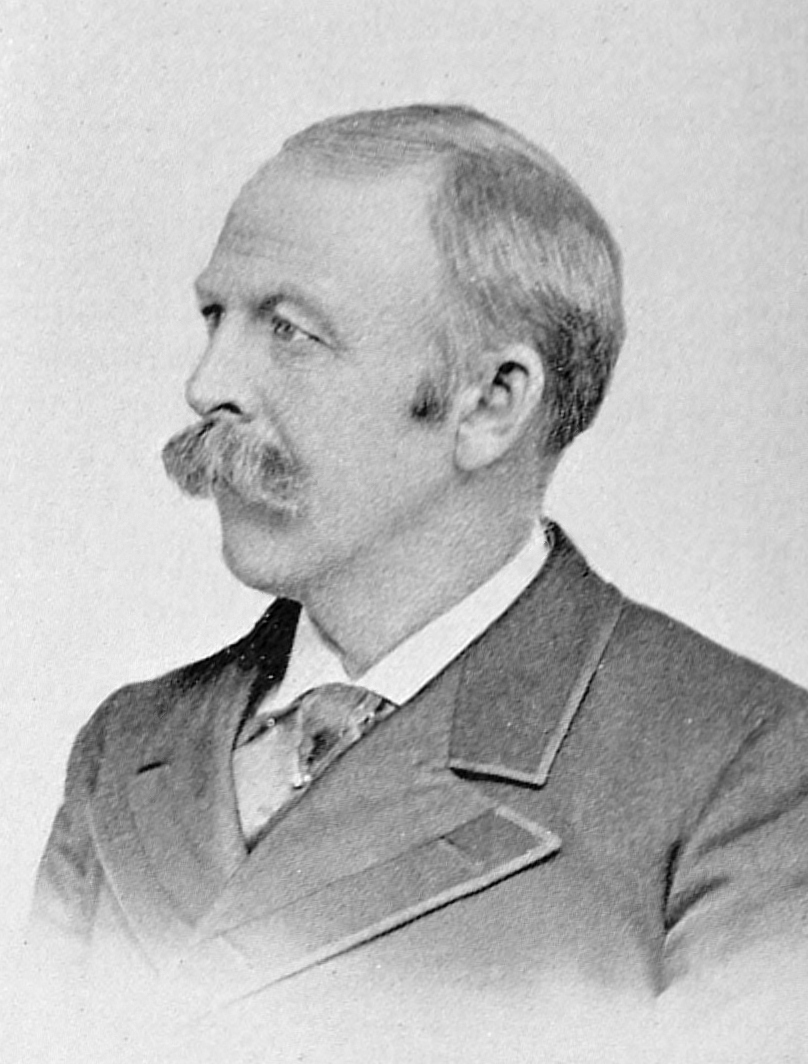

Judge of the Vermont Superior Court
- In office 1906–1912
- Preceded by: None (Court reorganized)
- Succeeded by: Frank L. Fish

President pro tempore of the Vermont Senate
- In office 1892–1894
- Preceded by: Frank A. Dwinell
- Succeeded by: Frank Plumley

Member of the Vermont Senate
- In office 1892–1894 Serving with Olin Merrill
- Preceded by: William R. Fairchild, Henry M. Stevens, Edward P. Adams
- Succeeded by: William Henry Hunt, Leander Cushman Leavens
- Constituency: Franklin County

State's Attorney of Franklin County, Vermont
- In office 1882–1884
- Preceded by: Harry E. Rustedt
- Succeeded by: George W. Burleson

Personal details
- Born: December 31, 1848 Athens, Vermont, U.S.
- Died: January 21, 1912 (aged 63) St. Albans City, Vermont, U.S.
- Resting place: Saxtons River Cemetery, Saxtons River, Vermont, U.S.
- Party: Republican
- Profession: Attorney

Alfred A. Hall (December 31, 1848 – January 21, 1912) was a Vermont attorney, politician and judge who served as President of the Vermont State Senate.

== Biography ==
Alfred Allen Hall was born in Athens, Vermont, on December 31, 1848. He was educated at Townshend's Leland and Gray Seminary, studied law, and began a practice in St. Albans in 1873. Among the prospective attorneys who studied in his office was Lee Stephen Tillotson.

A Republican, Hall served in local offices, including town meeting moderator, village president and school board member. From 1882 to 1884 he was Franklin County State's Attorney.

Hall was a longtime member of the Vermont National Guard, enlisting as a private and attaining the rank of colonel on the staff of Governor Samuel Pingree.

An active Mason, in 1887 Hall laid the cornerstone at the dedication of the Bennington Battle Monument.

In 1892 Hall was elected to the Vermont Senate. He served one term and was the Senate's President Pro Tem. Hall was named a judge of the Vermont Superior Court in 1906. He served until his death, and was succeeded by Frank L. Fish.

Judge Hall died in St. Albans on January 21, 1912.

Political offices
Preceded by Frank A. Dwinell	President pro tempore of the Vermont Senate; 1892 – 1894	Succeeded by Frank Plumley
