= John Kimball =

John Kimball may refer to:

- John Kimball (politician, born 1796) (1796–1884), American attorney and politician in New Hampshire and Vermont
- John Kimball (politician, born 1821) (1821–1912), American engineer and politician in New Hampshire
- John W. Kimball, American soldier and politician in Massachusetts

== See also ==
- John Kimble, the lead character in the film Kindergarten Cop
