= George Wilkins (disambiguation) =

George Wilkins (died 1618) was an English dramatist and pamphleteer.

George Wilkins may also refer to:

- George Wilkins (priest) (1785–1865), English Anglican priest
- George Wilkins (footballer) (1919–1999), English footballer
  - George Wilkins family, his 4 sons who played professional football, including Ray Wilkins
- George Wilkins (Vermont politician) (1817–1902), Vermont attorney and politician
- Sir (George) Hubert Wilkins (1888–1958), Australian polar explorer, pilot, soldier, geographer and photographer
- George Wilkins (composer) (1934–2024), American music composer and arranger
