= 1910 Vermont gubernatorial election =

- September 6, 1910
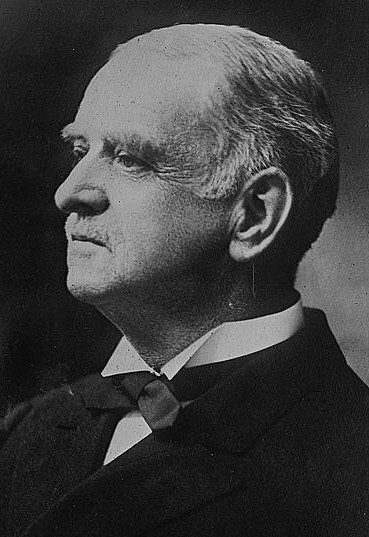

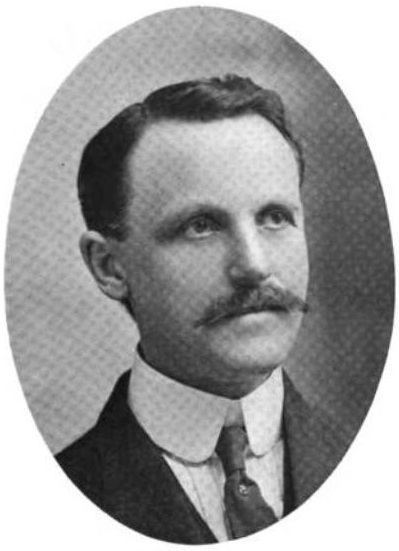
Nominee	John A. Mead	Charles D. Watson
Party	Republican	Democratic
Popular vote	35,263	17,425
Percentage	64.20%	31.72%
- Mead: 40–50% 50–60% 60–70% 70–80% 80–90% 90-100% Watson: 40–50% 50–60% 60–70% No Vote/Data
Governor before election
George H. Prouty
Republican
Elected Governor
John A. Mead
Republican

The 1910 Vermont gubernatorial election took place on September 6, 1910. Incumbent Republican George H. Prouty, per the "Mountain Rule", did not run for re-election to a second term as Governor of Vermont. Republican candidate John A. Mead defeated Democratic candidate Charles D. Watson to succeed him.

Marshall J. Hapgood, who ran a quixotic campaign for the Republican gubernatorial nomination, filed Vermont's first-ever campaign finance report, which indicated that he spent $103.76 (equivalent to $3,585 in 2025).

== Results ==
1910 Vermont gubernatorial election
Party	Candidate	Votes	%	±%
Republican	John A. Mead	35,263	64.20	
Democratic	Charles D. Watson	17,425	31.72	
Prohibition	Edwin R. Towle	1,044	1.92	
Socialist	Chester E. Ordway	1,055	1.90	
N/A	Other	141	0.26	
Total votes		54,928	100.0	
