= Harvey R. Kingsley =

American politician

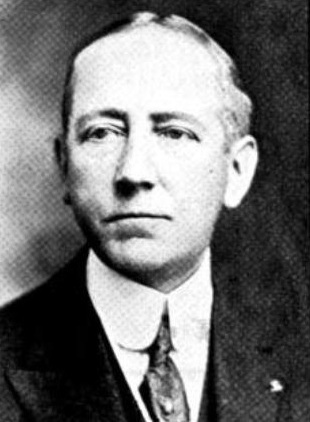

Harvey R. Kingsley (January 8, 1871 – January 2, 1936) was a Vermont politician, judge and attorney who served as President of the Vermont State Senate.

== Biography ==
Harvey Roberts Kingsley was born in Rutland, Vermont on January 8, 1871. He graduated from Columbia University in 1893 and received his law degree from Columbia University Law School in 1896, and was a member of the Psi Upsilon fraternity and the Philolexian Society. Kingsley practiced law in Rutland and was also involved in civic projects and programs, including serving as the volunteer coach of the Rutland High School track and field team.

A Republican, Kingsley served as chairman of Rutland's Republican Committee, and held local offices including grand juror and school board member.

Kingsley was a member of the Vermont National Guard, and attained the rank of Major.

From 1910 to 1912 Kingsley served as Secretary of Civil and Military Affairs (chief assistant) to Governor John A. Mead.

In 1918 Kingsley was elected to the Vermont Senate. He served two terms, 1919 to 1923 and was Senate President Pro Tem in his second term. Kingsley was elected to the Vermont House of Representatives in 1922 and served one term, 1923 to 1925.

From 1921 until his death Kingsley served as Rutland County Probate Judge.

Judge Kingsley died in Rutland on January 2, 1936.

Political offices
Preceded by Martin S. Vilas	President pro tempore of the Vermont State Senate; 1921 – 1923	Succeeded by Walter K. Farnsworth
