= Edward Seymour (Vermont politician) =

American politician (1810–1883)

Member of the Vermont House of Representatives
- In office 1860–1861
- In office 1847–1848

9th President pro tempore of the Vermont Senate
- In office 1852
- Preceded by: Asa Wentworth Jr.
- Succeeded by: Orlando Stevens

Member of the Vermont Senate
- In office 1850–1852

Personal details
- Born: October 26, 1810 Vergennes, Vermont, U.S.
- Died: June 15, 1883 (aged 72) Vergennes, Vermont, U.S.
- Party: Republican
- Other political affiliations: Whig
- Education: University of Vermont (MA)
- Occupation: Politician, farmer, businessman
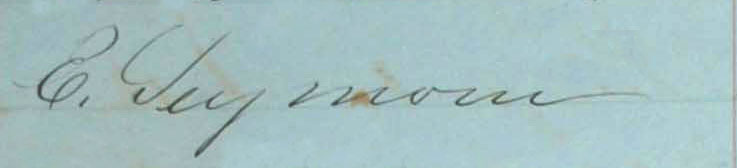
- Signature

Edward Seymour (October 26, 1810 – June 15, 1883) was a Vermont farmer, businessman and politician who served as President of the Vermont State Senate.

== Life and politics ==
Seymour was born in Vergennes, Vermont, on October 26, 1810. He graduated from the University of Vermont in 1831 and became a farmer and businessman in Vergennes. In addition to maintaining an interest in the Vermont Agricultural Society, Seymour served as President of the National Bank of Vergennes.

Originally a Whig, Seymour held local offices including Justice of the Peace, and he served in the Vermont House of Representatives from 1847 to 1848.

In 1850 Seymour received a Master of Arts degree from the University of Vermont.

He served in the Vermont Senate from 1850 to 1852, and was Senate President in 1852.

In 1853 Seymour was President of the Vermont Whig Convention.

Seymour became a Republican when the party was founded. He served again in the Vermont House from 1860 to 1861. He was a delegate to the 1870 state constitutional convention, and in 1876 was elected to another term in the Vermont Senate.

Seymour died in Vergennes on June 15, 1883.

Political offices
| Preceded by Asa Wentworth Jr. | President pro tempore of the Vermont State Senate; 1852 – 1852 | Succeeded by Orlando Stevens |
