= Bliss N. Davis =

American politician (1801–1885)

15th President pro tempore of the Vermont Senate
- In office 1859
- Preceded by: Lucius E. Chittenden
- Succeeded by: George Wilkins

Member of the Vermont Senate
- In office 1858–1860

Personal details
- Born: Bliss Nash Davis; December 8, 1801 Vergennes, Vermont, U.S.
- Died: February 11, 1885 (aged 83) Danville, Vermont, U.S.
- Party: Republican
- Other political affiliations: Whig
- Occupation: Politician, lawyer

Bliss Nash Davis (December 8, 1801 – February 11, 1885) was a Vermont politician and lawyer who served as President of the Vermont Senate.

== Biography ==
Bliss Nash Davis was born in Vergennes, Vermont on December 8, 1801. He studied law, was admitted to the bar, and practiced, first in Hardwick, and later in Danville.

Davis served in local offices, including Justice of the Peace. He was also involved in several businesses, including serving as President of the Caledonia National Bank.

Originally a Whig, and later a Republican, Davis served as Caledonia County State's Attorney from 1843 to 1844 and 1848 to 1850.

In 1850 Davis prosecuted William Warburton, alias "Bristol Bill" for counterfeiting. Upon hearing the guilty verdict Bristol Bill stabbed Davis in the back of the neck. Davis recovered, and the next day Bristol Bill was sentenced to 10 years in prison.

He served in the Vermont Senate from 1858 to 1860 and was Senate President in 1859.

Davis maintained an active law practice until just a few weeks before his death. He died in Danville on February 11, 1885.

Political offices
Preceded by Lucius E. Chittenden	President pro tempore of the Vermont State Senate; 1859 – 1859	Succeeded by George Wilkins
