= Asa S. Bloomer =

American politician and lawyer

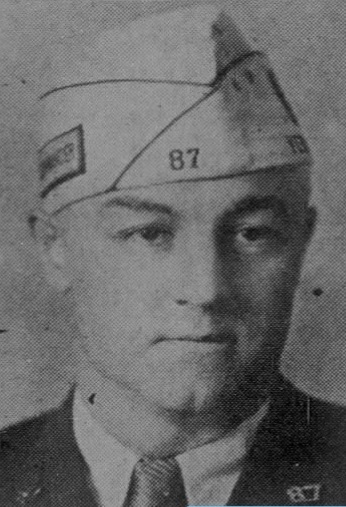
- Bloomer as department commander of the American Legion in 1934

President pro tempore of the Vermont State Senate
- In office 1959–1963
- Preceded by: Robert S. Babcock
- Succeeded by: Joseph H. Denny
- In office 1955–1957
- Preceded by: Carleton G. Howe
- Succeeded by: Robert S. Babcock
- In office 1949–1951
- Preceded by: Carroll L. Coburn
- Succeeded by: Merrill W. Harris

Member of the Vermont Senate from Rutland County
- In office 1945–1963 Serving with Various (multi-member district)
- Preceded by: John A. M. Hinsman, Hollis I. Loveland, Guy L. Stafford, Arthur C. Grover
- Succeeded by: Robert A. Bloomer (Appointed)

Speaker of the Vermont House of Representatives
- In office 1943–1945
- Preceded by: Lee E. Emerson
- Succeeded by: Joseph H. Denny

Member of the Vermont House of Representatives from West Rutland
- In office 1937–1945
- Preceded by: John J. Murphy
- Succeeded by: George Lamphere

State's Attorney of Rutland County, Vermont
- In office 1935–1937
- Preceded by: Jack A. Crowley
- Succeeded by: Angelo J. Spero

Personal details
- Born: Asa Schoonmaker Bloomer; August 15, 1891 Proctor, Vermont, U.S.
- Died: February 21, 1963 (aged 71) Montpelier, Vermont, U.S.
- Resting place: Evergreen Cemetery, Rutland, Vermont, U.S.
- Party: Republican
- Spouse: Florence E. O'Neil (m. 1918)
- Children: 2 (John H. Bloomer; Robert A. Bloomer)
- Education: University of Vermont; Yale Law School
- Profession: Attorney
- Nickname: "Ace"

Military service
- Service: United States Army
- Years of service: 1917–1918
- Rank: Second Lieutenant
- Unit: United States Army Air Service
- Wars: World War I

Asa Schoonmaker "Ace" Bloomer (August 15, 1891 – February 21, 1963) was an American politician and lawyer who served as Speaker of the Vermont House of Representatives and President Pro Tem of the Vermont Senate.

== Early life ==
Bloomer was born in Proctor, Vermont, on August 15, 1891. He graduated from the University of Vermont in 1913 and received a law degree from Yale Law School in 1916, afterwards practicing law in Rutland County.

== World War I ==
He enlisted in the Army for World War I and received a commission as a Second Lieutenant of Aviation. Bloomer served in Nebraska, Ohio, and Texas before being discharged in December, 1918.

== Rutland County State's Attorney ==
A Republican, Bloomer was Rutland County State's Attorney from 1935 to 1937. During his term he garnered nationwide headlines when he indicted Governor Charles M. Smith. Smith had been President of Rutland's Marble Bank and was accused with other bank officers of defrauding depositors. (In May 1932 Smith learned that his bank's bookkeeper had embezzled $251,000. Smith let the bookkeeper resign, did not disclose the theft, and charged the loss against the bank's surplus. In July 1935, the bookkeeper was named Rutland's Assistant City Treasurer and planned a candidacy for Treasurer. His political opponents then leaked word of the theft to the press. In December 1935 Bloomer charged Smith and other bank officers with abetting the theft for failing to inform account holders and authorities. The bookkeeper was convicted, and the bank Treasurer received a suspended sentence and paid a $400 fine. Charges against some other officers were dismissed. Smith was acquitted at trial)

Bloomer also brought charges against a Proctor, Vermont selectman for neglect of duty after the town sided with management and refused to provide emergency aid to the children of striking workers at the Vermont Marble Company.

== Vermont House of Representatives ==
In 1936 Bloomer ran successfully for the Vermont House of Representatives and served four terms, 1937 to 1945. In his final term (1943 to 1945) Bloomer served as Speaker of the House.

Bloomer ran unsuccessfully for the Republican nomination to be Lieutenant Governor in 1944, losing to Lee E. Emerson, who went on to win the general election.

== Vermont Senate ==
Bloomer ran successfully for the Vermont Senate in 1946, and he was re-elected eight times, serving from 1947 to his death. He was President Pro Tem of the Senate in 1949, 1955, and 1959 until his death.

== Death and burial ==
Bloomer died at Montpelier's Heaton Hospital on February 21, 1963, after suffering a heart attack at the Vermont State House. He was buried in Rutland's Evergreen Cemetery.

== Family ==
Asa Bloomer's sons, Robert A. Bloomer (1921–1999) and John H. Bloomer Sr. (1930–1995), both served in the Vermont Senate. Robert was Senate President from 1975 to 1985 and John served as President of the Senate from 1993 to 1995.

Judith Bloomer Crowley (née Wener; born 1936), the wife of John H. Bloomer Sr. and mother of John H. Bloomer Jr., served in the Vermont Senate from 1995 to 1997, and in the Vermont House from 2001 to 2005.

John H. Bloomer Jr. (born 1960) served in the Vermont Senate from 1997 to 2005. In 2011, he was appointed Secretary of the Senate.

== Legacy ==
The state office building in the city of Rutland was named for Asa S. Bloomer in 1999.

Political offices
Preceded by Lee E. Emerson	Speaker of the Vermont House of Representatives; 1943–1945	Succeeded by Joseph H. Denny
Preceded by Carroll L. Coburn	President pro tempore of the Vermont State Senate; 1949 – 1951	Succeeded by Merrill W. Harris
Preceded by Carleton G. Howe	President pro tempore of the Vermont State Senate; 1955 – 1957	Succeeded by Robert S. Babcock
Preceded by Robert S. Babcock	President pro tempore of the Vermont State Senate; 1959 – 1963	Succeeded by John H. Boylan
