= Merrill W. Harris =

American businessman and politician

President pro tempore of the Vermont State Senate
- In office 1951–1953
- Preceded by: Asa S. Bloomer
- Succeeded by: Carleton G. Howe

Member of the Vermont Senate from Washington County
- In office 1949–1953 Serving with Mildred M. Hayden, Donald W. Smith
- Preceded by: Willsie Brisbin, Carroll L. Coburn, Mildred M. Hayden
- Succeeded by: Mildred M. Hayden, Gerald R. Fitzpatrick, H. William Scott

Member of the Vermont House of Representatives from Montpelier
- In office 1965–1967
- Preceded by: Dorothy Shea
- Succeeded by: David F. Hoxie (District 9-1)
- In office 1944–1945
- Preceded by: Webster Evans Miller
- Succeeded by: Birney Hall
- In office 1939–1941
- Preceded by: Edward Leo Heney
- Succeeded by: Webster Evans Miller

Personal details
- Born: May 10, 1894 Montpelier, Vermont
- Died: May 3, 1967 (aged 72) Montpelier, Vermont
- Resting place: Green Mount Cemetery, Montpelier, Vermont
- Party: Republican
- Spouse: Genevieve B. Damon (m. 1920–1967, his death)
- Children: 1
- Occupation: Insurance company executive

Military service
- Allegiance: United States
- Branch: United States Army
- Years of service: 1917–1919
- Rank: Corporal
- Unit: Company F, 101st Ammunition Train, 26th Division
- Wars: World War I

Merrill W. Harris (May 10, 1894 – May 3, 1967), was a Vermont businessman and politician who served as President of the Vermont State Senate.

== Biography ==
Merrill Wallace Harris was born in Montpelier, Vermont on May 10, 1894. He was educated in Montpelier, and graduated from Montpelier High School in 1912.

Harris enlisted for World War I in May 1917. He served in Company H, 1st Vermont Infantry, which was federalized as Company F, 101st Ammunition Train, a unit of the 26th Division. Joining the Army at Fort Ethan Allen in Colchester, Vermont, Harris served in France and attained the rank of Corporal before being discharged at Fort Devens, Massachusetts in April 1919.

In 1923 Harris joined Montpelier's Union Mutual Fire Insurance Company. He rose through the executive ranks as special agent, adjuster, secretary and treasurer, and became the company's President in 1938. Harris later served as Union Mutual's chairman of the board of directors.

Harris was also a Vice President and member of the board of directors of the Montpelier Savings and Trust Company.

A Republican, Harris represented Montpelier in the Vermont House from 1939 to 1941. He served again in the Vermont House from 1944 to 1945.

Harris served in the Vermont Senate from 1949 to 1953, and was Senate President pro tem from 1951 to 1953.

Harris was elected to the Vermont House again in 1964. In 1965 he was elected Majority Leader, the first time Vermont's House Republicans formally appointed an official spokesman. (From the founding of the Republican party in the 1850s until demographic and other changes in the 1960s, Vermont had been a one party (Republican) state, so there was no need for parties to offer competing agendas.)

Harris was reelected to the House in 1966, but resigned in 1967 because of failing health.

Merrill Harris died in Montpelier on May 3, 1967. He was buried in Montpelier's Green Mount Cemetery.

Political offices
Preceded by Asa S. Bloomer	President pro tempore of the Vermont State Senate; 1951–1953	Succeeded by Carleton G. Howe
