= James Barrett (Vermont judge) =

American judge (1814–1900)

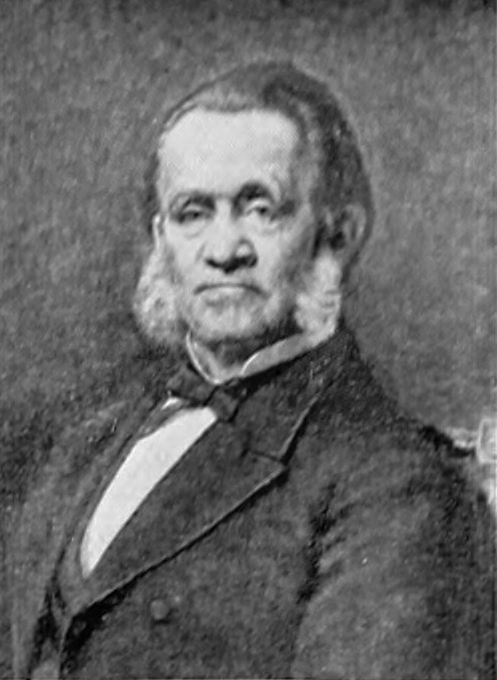

President of the Vermont Bar Association
- In office 1882–1883
- Preceded by: Daniel Roberts
- Succeeded by: Benjamin F. Fifield

Associate Justice of the Vermont Supreme Court
- In office 1857–1880
- Preceded by: None
- Succeeded by: Russell S. Taft

State's Attorney of Windsor County, Vermont
- In office 1854–1855
- Preceded by: Calvin French
- Succeeded by: John Ward

President pro tempore of the Vermont State Senate
- In office 1845
- Preceded by: Ebenezer N. Briggs
- Succeeded by: George T. Hodges

Member of the Vermont Senate
- In office 1844–1845 Serving with Justin Morgan, Thomas T. Barrett, Benjamin Billings
- Preceded by: Hampden Cutts, John Porter, Salmon F. Dutton, Abner Field
- Succeeded by: Artemas Cushman, Harvey Burton, Robert B. Cram, Dearborn H. Hilton
- Constituency: Windsor County

Personal details
- Born: May 31, 1814 Strafford, Vermont, U.S.
- Died: April 21, 1900 (aged 85) Rutland, Vermont, U.S.
- Resting place: Evergreen Cemetery; Rutland, Vermont
- Party: Whig; Republican
- Spouse: Maria Lord Woodworth (m. 1844)
- Children: 9
- Education: Dartmouth College
- Profession: Attorney

James Barrett (May 31, 1814 – April 21, 1900) was a Vermont lawyer, politician and judge who served as President of the Vermont State Senate and a justice of the Vermont Supreme Court.

== Early life ==
James Barrett was born in Strafford, Vermont on May 31, 1814, the son of Martin Barrett and Dorcas (Patterson) Barrett. He graduated from Dartmouth College in 1838, and received a master's degree in 1841. Barrett studied law, first with James Crocker of Buffalo, New York and later with Charles Marsh.

== Start of career ==
In 1840 Barrett began to practice law in Woodstock as Marsh's partner. In 1843 he became the partner of Jacob Collamer. From 1848 to 1849 Barrett practiced law in Boston, and upon returning to Woodstock he formed a partnership with Andrew Tracy and Julius Converse.

== Political career ==
A Whig, in 1844 and 1845 Barrett was elected to term in the Vermont Senate, and he was chosen by his peers to serve as Senate President in 1845. From 1854 to 1855 he was Windsor County State's Attorney. In 1857, by now a Republican, Barrett was appointed to the Vermont Supreme Court, where he served until 1880.

In 1865 Barrett received an honorary LL.D. from Middlebury College. Barrett also served as President of the Dartmouth College Alumni Association and the Vermont Bar Association.

== Later life ==
After leaving the bench Barrett resided in Rutland, and practiced law with his son James Crocker Barrett. After the younger Barrett's 1887 death the elder Barrett lived in retirement in Rutland.

== Death and burial ==
James Barrett died in Rutland on April 21, 1900. He was buried at Evergreen Cemetery in Rutland.

Political offices
Preceded by Ebenezer N. Briggs	President pro tempore of the Vermont State Senate; 1845 – 1846	Succeeded by George T. Hodges
