= Asa Wentworth Jr. =

American politician and businessman (1797-1882)

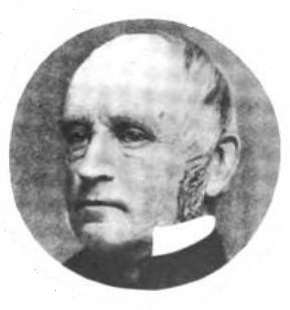

Asa Wentworth Jr. (April 4, 1797 – August 7, 1882) was a Vermont businessman and politician who served as President of the Vermont State Senate.

== Biography ==
Asa Wentworth Jr. was born in Alstead, New Hampshire on April 4, 1797. He was raised and educated in Alstead, became active in business, and represented Alstead as a Whig in the New Hampshire House of Representatives from 1828 to 1829, and again in 1832.

Wentworth was also active in the New Hampshire militia, and attained the rank of Colonel.

Wentworth subsequently relocated to Bellows Falls, Vermont. He was a Vice President of the Bellows Falls Savings Institution, and later a Director of the Bellows Falls National Bank. In addition he operated a hardware business with his brother, A. & J. H. Wentworth.

Active in local government, Wentworth served as Rockingham's Town Treasurer from 1846 to 1870, and was also the longtime Treasurer of Rockingham's School District.

Maintaining his Whig affiliation until joining the Republican Party at its founding, Wentworth served in the Vermont House of Representatives from 1838 to 1839 and 1848 to 1849.

He served in the Vermont Senate from 1851 to 1852 was Senate President.

Wentworth returned to the Vermont House from 1852 to 1853 and again in 1856.

Wentworth died in Bellows Falls on August 7, 1882. He was buried in Bellows Falls's Immanuel Cemetery.

Political offices
| Preceded by William Weston | President pro tempore of the Vermont State Senate; 1851–1852 | Succeeded by Edward Seymour |
