= 1928 Vermont gubernatorial election =

- November 6, 1928
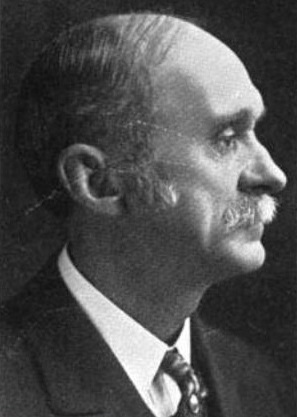

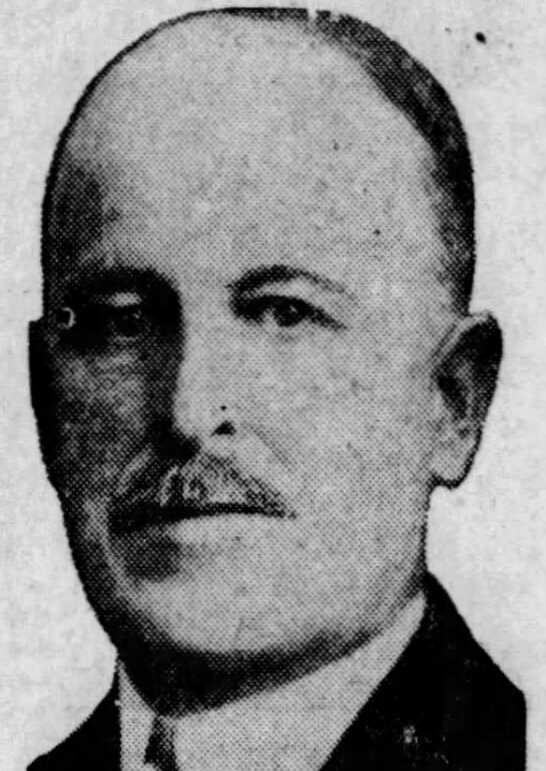
Nominee	John E. Weeks	Harry C. Shurtleff
Party	Republican	Democratic
Popular vote	94,974	33,563
Percentage	73.53%	25.98%
- Weeks: 50–60% 60–70% 70–80% 80–90% 90-100% Shurtleff: 50–60% 80–90% No Vote/Data
Governor before election
John E. Weeks
Republican
Elected Governor
John E. Weeks
Republican

The 1928 Vermont gubernatorial election took place on November 6, 1928. Incumbent Republican John E. Weeks ran successfully for re-election to a second term as Governor of Vermont, defeating Democratic candidate Harry C. Shurtleff, an attorney. Weeks, who sought an exception to the Vermont Republican Party's "Mountain Rule", was the first Vermont Governor elected to a second two-year term.

== Republican primary ==
=== Results ===
Republican primary results
Party	Candidate	Votes	%	±%
Republican	John E. Weeks (inc.)	37,554	65.7	
Republican	Edward H. Deavitt	19,558	34.2	
Republican	Other	5	0.0	
Total votes		57,112	100.0	

== Democratic primary ==
=== Results ===
Democratic primary results
Party	Candidate	Votes	%	±%
Democratic	Harry C. Shurtleff	2,990	99.3	
Democratic	Other	20	0.7	
Total votes		3,010	100.0	

== General election ==
=== Candidates ===
- John E. Weeks, incumbent Governor of Vermont
- Frank M. Post, resident of Burlington
- Harry C. Shurtleff, lawyer and former Mayor of Montpelier

=== Results ===
1928 Vermont gubernatorial election
Party	Candidate	Votes	%	±%
Republican	John E. Weeks (inc.)	94,974	73.53	
Democratic	Harry C. Shurtleff	33,563	25.98	
Prohibition	Frank M. Post	611	0.47	
N/A	Other	25	0.02	
Total votes		129,173	100.0	
