= Ebenezer N. Briggs =

American lawyer and politician

President pro tempore of the Vermont Senate
- In office 1843–1845
- Preceded by: Horace Eaton
- Succeeded by: James Barrett

Member of the Vermont Senate
- In office 1842–1845 Serving with Elisha Allen, Alonson Allen (1842, 1843), Frederick Button, Joseph H. Chittenden (1844)
- Preceded by: Isaac Norton, Orson Clark, Anderson G. Dana
- Succeeded by: Frederick Button, Joseph H. Chittenden, George T. Hodges
- Constituency: Rutland County
- In office 1836–1839 Serving with Jesse Grandey (1836), Harvey Bell (1836, 1837), Ville Lawrence (1837, 1838), Samuel Swift (1838)
- Preceded by: None (position created)
- Succeeded by: Ville Lawrence, Samuel Swift, Joseph Simonds
- Constituency: Addison County

33rd and 38th Speaker of the Vermont House of Representatives
- In office 1845–1847
- Preceded by: Andrew Tracy
- Succeeded by: Solomon Foot
- In office 1834–1836
- Preceded by: John Smith
- Succeeded by: Carlos Coolidge

Member of the Vermont House of Representatives
- In office 1845–1847
- Preceded by: Nathan T. Sprague
- Succeeded by: Nathan T. Sprague
- Constituency: Brandon
- In office 1831–1836
- Preceded by: Elnathan Darling
- Succeeded by: Aaron Barrows
- Constituency: Salisbury

State's Attorney of Addison County, Vermont
- In office 1831–1839
- Preceded by: William Slade
- Succeeded by: Ozias Seymour

Personal details
- Born: November 1, 1801 Middleboro, Massachusetts, U.S.
- Died: January 26, 1873 (aged 71) Brandon, Vermont, U.S.
- Resting place: Pine Hill Cemetery, Brandon, Vermont, U.S
- Party: Whig; Republican
- Spouse(s): Abigail Miles; Louisa Witherell; Adeline Young
- Relations: Ebenezer J. Ormsbee (son in law)
- Children: 9
- Profession: Attorney

Ebenezer N. Briggs (November 1, 1801 – January 26, 1873) was an American lawyer and politician in the U.S. state of Vermont. He served as the Speaker of the Vermont House of Representatives and as President Pro Tem of the Vermont Senate. He was also the father-in-law and law partner of Governor Ebenezer J. Ormsbee.

== Early life ==
Ebenezer Nelson Briggs was born in Middleboro, Massachusetts on November 1, 1801. He was raised and educated in Middleboro, attended the public schools, and graduated from Middleboro's Pierce Academy. He subsequently attended a school in Providence, Rhode Island. He then moved to Pittsford, Vermont, where he studied law with attorney George Newell. Briggs was admitted to the bar in 1823 and began to practice in Salisbury, Vermont. For several years he served as Addison County State's Attorney. John Prout, later a Justice of the Vermont Supreme Court, studied law under Briggs' and became Briggs' partner after attaining admission to the bar.

Briggs later moved to Brandon, Vermont. For many years Briggs was the attorney for the Rutland Railroad, and also served as an officer and director of the Bank of Brandon and the Brandon National Bank. He continued to practice law in partnership with Ebenezer J. Ormsbee, who served as Vermont Governor from 1886 to 1888.

== Political career ==
Originally a Whig and later a Republican, Briggs served several terms in the Vermont House of Representatives and was Speaker from 1834 to 1836 and from 1845 to 1847. He also served several terms in the Vermont Senate. From 1843 to 1845 he was Senate President Pro Tem.

Briggs died in Brandon on January 26, 1873. He was a longtime trustee of Brandon's Pine Hill Cemetery, and he was buried there following his death.

== Family life ==
Briggs was the father of Jennie L. Briggs (February 1, 1841 – June 1, 1866), the first wife of Governor E. J. Ormsbee.

Political offices
Preceded by John Smith	Speaker of the Vermont House of Representatives; 1834–1836	Succeeded by Carlos Coolidge
Preceded by Horace Eaton	President pro tempore of the Vermont Senate; 1843 – 1845	Succeeded by James Barrett
Preceded by Andrew Tracy	Speaker of the Vermont House of Representatives; 1845–1847	Succeeded by Solomon Foot
