= Oliver P. Chandler =

American politician (1807–1895)

Member of the Vermont House of Representatives
- In office 1862–1863
- In office 1839–1841

6th President pro tempore of the Vermont Senate
- In office 1849–1851
- Preceded by: John Kimball
- Succeeded by: William Weston

Member of the Vermont Senate
- In office 1848–1852

Personal details
- Born: Oliver Phelps Chandler; May 29, 1807 Peacham, Vermont, U.S.
- Died: September 19, 1895 (aged 88) Woodstock, Vermont, U.S.
- Party: Republican
- Other political affiliations: Whig
- Education: Dartmouth College
- Occupation: Politician, attorney

Oliver Phelps Chandler (May 29, 1807 – September 19, 1895) was a Vermont attorney and politician who served as President of the Vermont Senate.

== Biography ==
Oliver Phelps Chandler was born in Peacham, Vermont on May 29, 1807. He graduated from Dartmouth College in 1828, studied law, was admitted to the bar, and began a practice in Woodstock. Among the prospective attorneys who studied under his tutelage was Frederick H. Billings.

Chandler was also involved in several business ventures, including serving as President of the Woodstock National Bank.

Initially a Whig, and later a Republican, from 1836 to 1838 Chandler was Windsor County State's Attorney.

Chandler served in the Vermont House of Representatives from 1839 to 1841.

From 1848 to 1852 Chandler served in the Vermont Senate, and was the Senate's President Pro Tem from 1849 to 1851.

Chandler served as a trustee of Norwich University from 1849 to 1853.

He served in the Vermont House again from 1862 to 1863.

Chandler was the Chairman of the Vermont Republican Convention in 1865.

Oliver P. Chandler died in Woodstock on September 19, 1895.

Political offices
| Preceded by John Kimball | President pro tempore of the Vermont State Senate; 1849 – 1851 | Succeeded by William Weston |
