= Edward H. Edgerton =

American politician

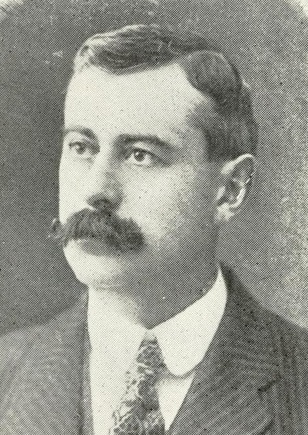

Edward H. Edgerton (August 31, 1863 – July 7, 1934) was a Vermont businessman, lawyer, judge, and politician who served as president of the Vermont State Senate.

== Biography ==
Edward Henry Edgerton was born in Warren, Vermont on August 31, 1863. He graduated from Barre Academy in 1885 and settled in Rochester, where he became the Treasurer of the White River Lumber Company and was involved in several other business ventures.

Edgerton later studied law and established a practice in Rochester.

A Republican, Edgerton served in several local offices, including selectman and town clerk.

Edgerton served in the Vermont House of Representatives from 1907 to 1911, and in the Vermont Senate from 1911 to 1913.

In 1912 he was elected Windsor County Assistant Judge, and he served from 1913 to 1921.

In 1924 Edgerton was again elected to the Vermont Senate. He served one term, 1925 to 1927, and was the Senate's President Pro Tempore.

Edgerton was an unsuccessful candidate for lieutenant governor in 1926, losing to Hollister Jackson, who went on to win the general election.

In 1928 Edgerton was again elected to the Vermont House of Representatives. He served one term, 1929 to 1931 and was chairman of the Ways & Means Committee.

Edward H. Edgerton died in Rochester on July 7, 1934.

Political offices
Preceded by Walter K. Farnsworth	President pro tempore of the Vermont State Senate; 1925–1927	Succeeded by Levi P. Smith
