= Walter K. Farnsworth =

American politician (1870–1929)

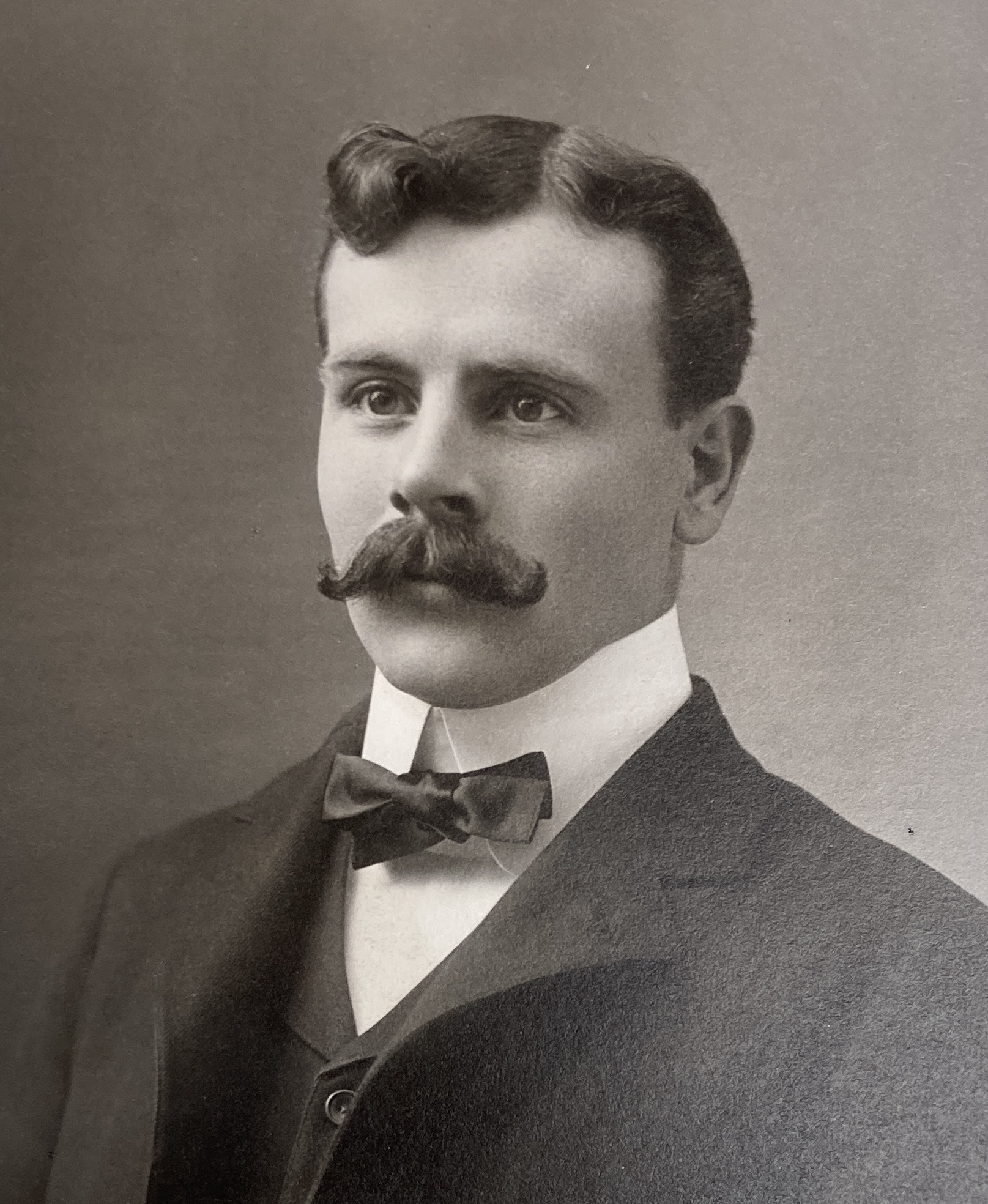
- Farnsworth in 1900

55th Lieutenant Governor of Vermont
- In office January 8, 1925 – January 6, 1927
- Governor: Franklin S. Billings
- Preceded by: Franklin S. Billings
- Succeeded by: Hollister Jackson

President pro tempore of the Vermont Senate
- In office 1923–1925
- Preceded by: Harvey R. Kingsley
- Succeeded by: Edward H. Edgerton

Member of the Vermont Senate from Chittenden County, Vermont
- In office 1923–1925 Serving with Irving Smith Coburn (died January 20, 1923), Frank S. Ransom (appointed January 24, 1923), Harry M. Fay, William B. McKillip, Martin S. Vilas
- Preceded by: Irving Smith Coburn, William B. McKillip, Martin S. Vilas, Moses Sheldon
- Succeeded by: Malcolm D. Dimick, Dan Marshall Johnson, Levi P. Smith, Martin S. Vilas

Personal details
- Born: November 17, 1870 Windsor, Vermont
- Died: August 2, 1929 (aged 58) Rutland, Vermont
- Resting place: Ascutney Cemetery, Windsor, Vermont
- Profession: Attorney

Walter Kellogg Farnsworth (November 17, 1870 – August 2, 1929) was a Vermont attorney and politician who served as the 55th lieutenant governor of Vermont.

== Life and career ==
Farnsworth was born in Windsor, Vermont on November 17, 1870. He attended high school in Chester and Woodstock, and then studied law. He attained admission to the bar and established a practice in Rutland. Farnsworth was also a horse breeder and an active member of the Rutland County Agricultural Society.

A Republican, Farnsworth began his involvement in politics and government by serving as a Justice of the Peace and as Assistant Secretary and Secretary of the Vermont Senate in the late 1890s and early 1900s.

Farnsworth was Judge of the Rutland City Court from 1907 to 1909. In 1908 he was an unsuccessful candidate for the Republican nomination for Secretary of State.

In 1912 he was an unsuccessful candidate for the Republican nomination for a seat in the United States House of Representatives. Farnsworth also became involved with the Progressive Party, but later returned to the Republican fold.

In 1918 he ran unsuccessfully for the Republican nomination for Vermont Secretary of State.

Farnsworth subsequently moved to Burlington. He was elected to the Vermont Senate in 1922 and served one term, also serving as Senate President.

In 1924 Farnsworth won election as Lieutenant Governor and served one term, 1925 to 1927.

Farnsworth ran unsuccessfully for governor in 1926, losing the Republican primary to John E. Weeks.

Farnsworth died in Rutland on August 2, 1929. He was interred at Ascutney Cemetery in Windsor, Vermont.

== Family ==
Farnsworth was the son of attorney Jonathan Brewer Farnsworth and Maria Augusta (Hatch) Farnsworth. Farnsworth's siblings included brothers George Henry (b. 1860), James Slayton (b. 1866), and Arthur White (b. 1872). Farnsworth never married, and had no children.

== Sources ==
Party political offices
Preceded by Franklin S. Billings	Republican nominee for Lieutenant Governor of Vermont; 1924	Succeeded by Hollister Jackson
Political offices
Preceded by Harvey R. Kingsley	President pro tempore of the Vermont State Senate; 1923 – 1925	Succeeded by Edward H. Edgerton
Preceded by Franklin S. Billings	Lieutenant Governor of Vermont; 1925–1927	Succeeded by Hollister Jackson
