= John A. Mead Manufacturing Company =

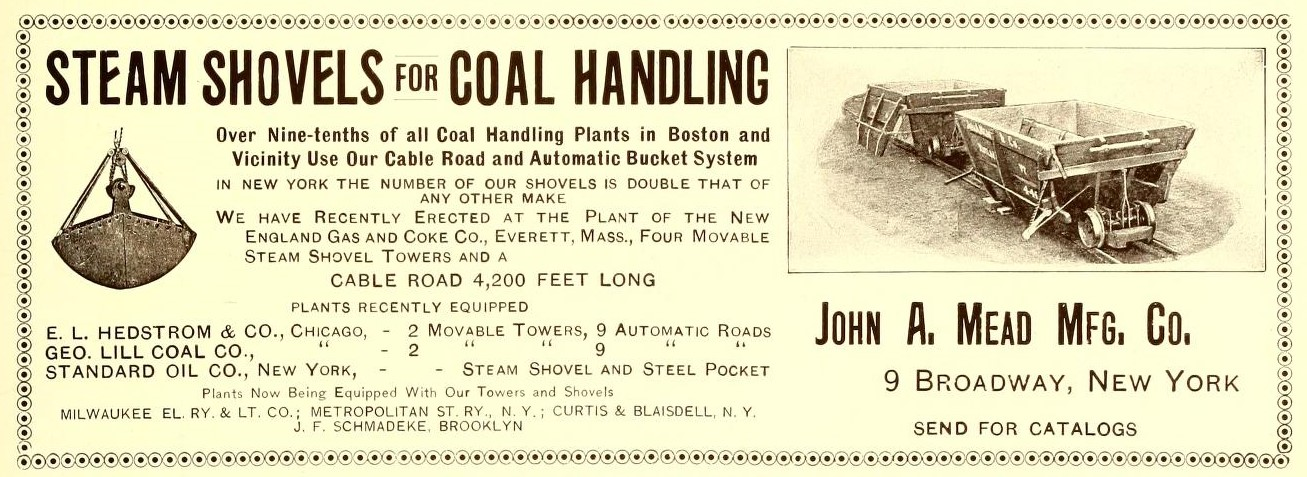
- Industry: Manufacturing
- Founded: 1890; 135 years ago in New York City, USA
- Founder: John A. Mead
- Fate: Defunct
- Headquarters: New York, USA
- Products: Steam shovels

The John A. Mead Manufacturing Company was based at 9 Broadway in New York City and produced steam shovels for coal handling.

== Products ==
The company was founded by John A. Mead in the late 1890s and erected four movable steam shovel towers and a 4,200 feet (1280 m) long cable railroad at the plant of the New England Gas and Coke Company in Everett, Massachusetts.

Over 90 percent of all coal handling plants in Boston and vicinity used Mead Company cable railroad and automatic bucket systems. In New York City, the number of Mead shovels was double that of any other make.

The Mead Company equipped the following plants:

- E. L. Hedstrom & Co., Chicago: 2 movable towers, 9 automatic roads
- Geo. Lill Coal Co., Chicago: 2 movable towers, 9 automatic roads
- Standard Oil Company, New York: Steam shovel and steel pocket
- The Milwaukee Electric Railway and Light Company
- Metropolitan Street Railway, New York
- Curtis & Blaisdell, New York
- J. F. Schmadeke, Brooklyn
