= John A. M. Hinsman =

American politician

John A. M. Hinsman (March 22, 1911 - October 31, 1980) was a Vermont politician and attorney who served as President of the Vermont State Senate.

== Biography ==
John Abner Mead Hinsman was born in Rutland, Vermont on March 22, 1911. He was named for his maternal grandfather, Governor John Abner Mead. John Hinsman was the son of Carl B. Hinsman, who also served in the Vermont State Senate.

John A. M. Hinsman graduated from Phillips Exeter Academy in 1930, Dartmouth College in 1934 and Yale Law School in 1937, afterwards practicing law in Rutland.

A Republican, Hinsman served in local offices including alderman. In 1942 he was elected to the Vermont Senate. He served three terms, 1943 to 1949, and was Senate President from 1945 to 1947.

Hinsman died in Rutland on October 31, 1980. He was buried in Rutland's Evergreen Cemetery.

Political offices
Preceded by Lee E. Emerson	President pro tempore of the Vermont State Senate; 1945 – 1947	Succeeded by Carroll L. Coburn
