= 1831 City Bank of New York theft =

Early American bank heist

Coordinates: 40°42′22″N 74°00′31″W

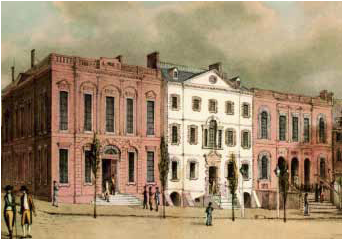
View of the northeast corner of William and Wall streets. The house to the far right became City Bank of New York's first home at 38 Wall Street, later renumbered as No.52. (Painting by Archibald Robertson, c. 1798)

The 1831 City Bank of New York theft took place on March 19, 1831, in New York City, New York, United States, when burglars stole $245,000 (1831 values) from the City Bank (now Citibank) on Wall Street, using a set of copied keys. The theft is regarded as one of the first bank heists in U.S. history. The amount stolen would come to over $52 million in 2013 currency. Initial reports variously reported the names of the culprits as Edward Smith, Edward Jones, James Honeyman and James Murray. A modern source, drawing on period newspapers, identifies the thieves as James Honeyman and William J. Murray.

Murray and Honeyman, who used both "Smith" and "Jones" as aliases, spent $60,000 before their arrest. Murray fled to Philadelphia, while Honeyman remained in New York under an alias. Both were captured, convicted, and sentenced to five years in Sing Sing Prison.

The Connecticut Courant reported that the suspect, Smith (Honeyman), was apprehended "due to the acuteness and indefatigable vigilance of High Constable Hays." Honeyman had been apprehended in the previous year for robbing "Mr. Schenck's store" in Brooklyn. He was a "Morocco (leather) dresser" by trade who kept a small shoe store on the Bowery where he allowed "dissipated profligates" to gather. Constable Hays found nothing during his first search of the Division Street rooms where Honeyman lived with his wife and two children. Tipped off by the keeper of the lodging house, who saw Honeyman carrying a trunk out of his rooms, the "acute" Constable Hays returned later in the week, and he decided to search the trunks remaining in the apartment. This time, he found most of the stolen money hidden under clothing in one of the trunks. The suspect was seized and taken to New York's colonial-era Bridewell prison. Authorities recovered: $57,328 in City Bank notes; $501,118 in "various city notes;" $44,000 in Lansingburgh Bank Notes (a bank in Lansingburgh, New York); $20,000 in notes issued by the "Morris Canal"; $8,272 recorded as "uncurrent - belonging to S. & M. Allen"; and $40 worth of counterfeit notes. $63,000 of stolen money was never recovered, a sum that included 398 doubloons.
