= John A. Mead =

American politician

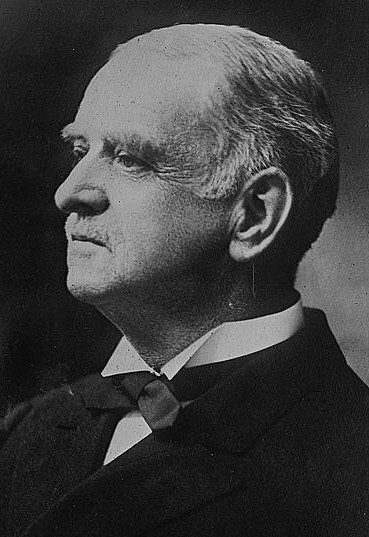

53rd Governor of Vermont
- In office October 5, 1910 – October 3, 1912
- Lieutenant: Leighton P. Slack
- Preceded by: George H. Prouty
- Succeeded by: Allen M. Fletcher

47th Lieutenant Governor of Vermont
- In office October 8, 1908 – October 5, 1910
- Governor: George H. Prouty
- Preceded by: George H. Prouty
- Succeeded by: Leighton P. Slack

Member of the Vermont House of Representatives from Rutland City
- In office 1906–1908
- Preceded by: George A. Smith
- Succeeded by: Earle S. Kinsley

Mayor of Rutland City, Vermont
- In office 1893–1894
- Preceded by: None (position created)
- Succeeded by: Levi G. Kingsley

Member of the Vermont Senate from Rutland County
- In office 1892–1893 Serving with Arunah W. Hyde; John G. Pitkin; Fletcher D. Proctor
- Preceded by: Levi G. Kingsley; Albert J. Dickinson; Cyrus Jennings; Simon L. Peck
- Succeeded by: Frank D. White; Ira R. Allen; Amos D. Tiffany; Noah S. Walker

Personal details
- Born: April 20, 1841 Fair Haven, Vermont, U.S.
- Died: January 12, 1920 (aged 78) Rutland, Vermont, U.S.
- Resting place: Evergreen Cemetery Rutland, Vermont, U.S.
- Party: Republican
- Education: Middlebury College; Columbia University College of Physicians and Surgeons
- Profession: Physician; Businessman

Military service
- Allegiance: United States (Union)
- Service: Union Army
- Years of service: 1862–1863
- Rank: Private
- Unit: Company K, 12th Vermont Regiment
- Wars: American Civil War

John Abner Mead (April 20, 1841 – January 12, 1920) was an American physician, businessman and politician who served as 47th lieutenant governor of Vermont from 1908 to 1910, and the 53rd governor of Vermont, from 1910 to 1912.

== Biography ==
Mead was born in Fair Haven, Vermont, to Roswell and Lydia Mead (née Gorham). He was educated at the common school in West Rutland and at Franklin Academy in Malone, New York. He began attendance at Middlebury College but interrupted his studies to enlist in the Union Army for the American Civil War. Mead joined Company K, 12th Vermont Infantry Regiment, serving from 1862 to 1863. After mustering out of the military, he graduated from Middlebury College in 1864. While at Middlebury he joined the Alpha Alpha chapter of Delta Kappa Epsilon (DKE) Fraternity.

In 1868 he received a medical degree from the College of Physicians and Surgeons at Columbia University in New York City.

He married Mary Madelia Sherman in 1872 and they had one daughter, Mary Sherman Mead. Mary Mead's son and John A. Mead's grandson John A. M. Hinsman served as President of the Vermont Senate from 1945 to 1947.

== Career ==
Mead practiced medicine in New York City for two years, and in Rutland from 1870 to 1888, when he was appointed chair of the medical department at the University of Vermont. A Republican, Mead served in the Vermont Senate from 1892 to 1893. When Rutland City became a separate municipality from Rutland Town, Mead served as the city's first Mayor, holding office from 1893 to 1894. In 1893 he was a Vermont Commissioner for the World's Columbian Exposition in Chicago. Mead served in the Vermont House of Representatives in 1906 and was Lieutenant Governor from 1908 to 1910.

Mead was elected governor in 1910 and served from October 5, 1910 to October 3, 1912. During his tenure, he presided over the state legislature's reapportionment of state senatorial districts and legislation was enacted during his administration establishing a State School of Agriculture, requiring the registration of nurses, and providing for a direct primary.

After his governorship, Mead resumed his business interests. He was president of Baxter National Bank, Howe Scale Company, and John A. Mead Manufacturing Company. He was also a director of the Rutland Railroad.

Mead was a Trustee of Middlebury College, the University of Vermont and Norwich University; all three conferred the honorary degree of LL.D. upon him in 1911. He made substantial donations to Middlebury, including the financing of its Mead Memorial Chapel which was constructed in 1916. (Note: The name "Mead" was removed from the Chapel in 2021 due to Mead's role in advancing the eugenics movement as governor and is now referred to as Middlebury Chapel.) He was a delegate to the Republican National Convention in 1912, and a member of the Grand Army of the Republic.

== Death ==
Mead died of pneumonia at his home in Rutland, Rutland County, Vermont, on January 12, 1920. He is interred in Rutland's Evergreen Cemetery.

== Notes ==
Party political offices
Preceded by George H. Prouty	Republican nominee for Lieutenant Governor of Vermont; 1908	Succeeded by Leighton P. Slack
Preceded by George H. Prouty	Republican nominee for Governor of Vermont; 1910	Succeeded by Allen M. Fletcher
Political offices
Preceded by George H. Prouty	Lieutenant Governor of Vermont; 1908–1910	Succeeded by Leighton P. Slack
Preceded by George H. Prouty	Governor of Vermont; 1910–1912	Succeeded by Allen M. Fletcher
