= William Weston (Vermont politician) =

American politician (1803–1875)

7th President pro tempore of the Vermont Senate
- In office 1850
- Preceded by: Oliver P. Chandler
- Succeeded by: Asa Wentworth Jr.

Personal details
- Born: January 24, 1803 Reading, Massachusetts, U.S.
- Died: March 19, 1875 (aged 72) New York City, U.S.
- Party: Republican
- Other political affiliations: Whig; Free Soil
- Spouse(s): Sarah Maria Lyman (m. 1835; died 1843) Melinda Colver (m. 1858)
- Children: 1
- Occupation: Politician, attorney

William Weston (January 24, 1803 – March 19, 1875) was an American attorney and politician in Burlington, Vermont, and Brooklyn, New York. He served in several local and state offices, and is most notable for his service as a member of the Vermont Senate in the 1850s.

== Early life ==
Weston was born in Reading, Massachusetts on January 24, 1803, the son of William Weston and Synthe (Porter) Weston. He was raised in Montreal, where his father had moved his family shortly after his birth. His father died in 1818, and Weston moved to Craftsbury, Vermont, where he began a career as a merchant, first in Craftsbury, and later in Newport. In 1827, Weston began to study law in the office of Augustus Young, and in 1829 he moved to Burlington, where he continued to study law with attorney Charles Adams. He was admitted to the bar in 1830, and practiced in Burlington.

== Career ==
After settling in Burlington, Weston became active in politics, and was an advocate of abolishing slavery. He moved from the Whig Party to the Free Soil Party, back to the Whigs, and then to the Republican Party as the abolition movement coalesced and expanded during the 1840s and 1850s. In addition to advocating the abolition of slavery, Weston was also active in the temperance movement.

Prior to Burlington's incorporation as a city, it had a town government, and Weston served as a justice of the peace, and was a member of the board of selectmen in 1829, and from 1850 to 1853. From 1836 to 1847, Weston was Chittenden County's register of probate, and he was the assistant secretary of the Vermont Senate in 1836, 1837, 1838, 1839, and 1840. From 1839 to 1842 he was the reporter of decisions for the Vermont Supreme Court, and in 1842, Weston served as secretary for the state Council of Censors, the body that met every seven years to review actions of the executive and legislative branches and ensure their constitutionality. In 1847 he was assistant clerk of the Vermont House of Representatives. In 1849 and 1850, Weston was elected to the Vermont Senate; he served until 1851, and was the Senate's President pro tempore in 1850.

In 1860, Weston moved to Brooklyn, New York, and he practiced law in New York City until his death. In 1872, Weston was a supporter of the Liberal Republican Party and the presidential candidacy of Horace Greeley.

== Death and burial ==
Weston died in Brooklyn on March 19, 1875. He was buried in Plot 206 of Locust Street Cemetery in Burlington. The street's name was later changed to Elmwood Avenue, and the burial ground is now known as Elmwood Cemetery.

== Family ==
In 1835, Weston married Sarah Maria Lyman (d. 1843). Their only child, Ellen, was born in 1841 and died in 1844. In 1858, he married Melinda Colver (1819–1896). They had no children.

== Honors ==
In 1846, Weston received the honorary degree of Master of Arts from the University of Vermont.

== Sources ==
=== Books ===
- Colver, Frederic Lathrop (1910). Colver-Culver Genealogy: Descendants of Edward Colver of Boston, etc. New York, NY: Frank Allaben Genealogical Company. ISBN 9780598443656.
- Hemenway, Abby Maria (1867). The Vermont Historical Gazetteer. Vol. 1. Burlington, VT: A. M. Hemenway.
- Rann, William S. (1886). History of Chittenden County, Vermont. Syracuse, NY: D. Mason & Co.
- Rodriguez, Junius P. (2015). Encyclopedia of Emancipation and Abolition in the Transatlantic World. Vol. 1–3. New York, NY: Routledge. ISBN 978-0-7656-1257-1.
- University of Vermont (1854). Triennial Catalogue of the University of Vermont. Burlington, VT: Free Press Printers.
- Vermont Council of Censors (1842). Journal of the Sessions of the Council of Censors. Burlington, VT: Chauncey Goodrich.
- Vermont General Assembly (1836). Journal of the House of Representatives of the State of Vermont. Montpelier, VT: E. P. Walton & Sons.
- Vermont General Assembly (1837). Journal of the House of Representatives of the State of Vermont. Montpelier, VT: E. P. Walton & Sons.
- Vermont General Assembly (1839). Journal of the House of Representatives of the State of Vermont. Montpelier, VT: E. P. Walton & Sons.
- Vermont General Assembly (1840). Journal of the House of Representatives of the State of Vermont. Montpelier, VT: E. P. Walton & Sons.
- Vermont General Assembly (1848). Journal of the House of Representatives of the State of Vermont. Montpelier, VT: E. P. Walton & Sons.
- Vermont General Assembly (1849). Journal of the Senate of the State of Vermont. Burlington, VT: Burlington Free Press.
- Vermont General Assembly (1850). Journal of the Senate of the State of Vermont. Burlington, VT: Burlington Free Press.

=== Newspapers ===
- "State Convention". Burlington Free Press. Burlington, VT. June 29, 1838 – via Newspapers.com.
- "Proceedings of the Temperance Convention". Burlington Free Press. Burlington, VT. December 6, 1844 – via Newspapers.com.
- "Honorary Degrees Conferred". Vermont Watchman and State Journal. Montpelier, VT. August 20, 1846 – via Newspapers.com.
- "Whig State Ticket". Burlington Free Press. Burlington, VT. August 9, 1850 – via Newspapers.com.
- "Whig State Convention: Whig Anti-Slavery Platform". Burlington Free Press. Burlington, VT. October 18, 1851 – via Newspapers.com.
- "Republican Caucus". Burlington Free Press. Burlington, VT. August 28, 1857 – via Newspapers.com.
- "Personal News Items: Hon. William Weston". The Argus & Patriot. Montpelier, VT. January 15, 1874 – via Newspapers.com.
- "The Remains of the Late Hon. William Weston Arrived in this City Monday Afternoon". Burlington Sentinel. Burlington, VT. March 23, 1875 – via Newspapers.com.
- "Hon. William Weston". The Express and Standard. Newport, VT. March 30, 1875 – via Newspapers.com.
- "The Late William Weston". Burlington Free Press. Burlington, VT. April 2, 1875 – via Newspapers.com.

=== Internet ===
- Weston, William (July 25, 1848). "Letter from William Weston to George Perkins Marsh". Digital Collections. University of Vermont Libraries.
- "Massachusetts Town and Vital Records, 1620–1988, Reading, Massachusetts Birth Entry for William Weston". Ancestry.com. Provo, UT: Ancestry.com, LLC. January 24, 1803.
- "Vermont Vital Records, 1720–1908, Marriage Record for William Weston and Maria Lyman". Ancestry.com. Provo, UT: Ancestry.com, LLC. September 29, 1835.
- "Vermont Vital Records, 1720–1908, Death Record for Ellen Maria Weston". Ancestry.com. Provo, UT: Ancestry.com, LLC. July 29, 1844.
- Basta, Daniel; et al. (2008). "Elmwood Cemetery: A Walking Tour of Burlington's History" (PDF). enjoyburlington.com. Burlington, VT: Cemetery Division, City of Burlington.

Political offices
Preceded by Oliver P. Chandler	President pro tempore of the Vermont State Senate; 1850	Succeeded by Asa Wentworth Jr.
