= Frederick H. Babbitt =

American businessman and politician (1859-1931)

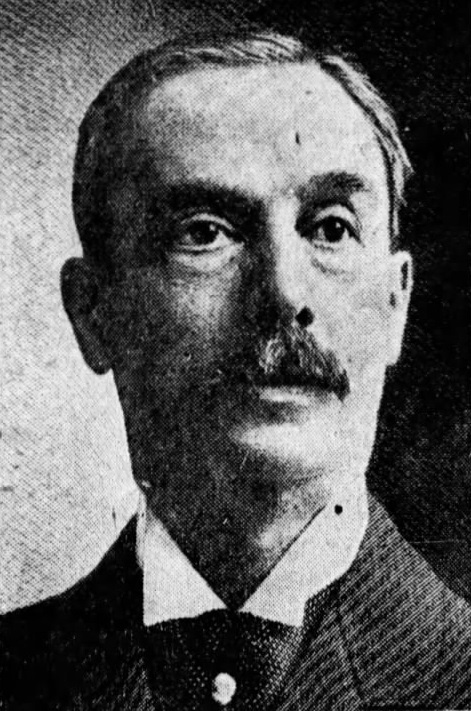
Vermont Journal (Windsor, VT), August 20, 1920

Frederick H. Babbitt (November 23, 1859 – July 29, 1931) was a Vermont businessman and politician who served as President of the Vermont State Senate.

== Biography ==
Frederick Herbert Babbitt was born in Keene, New Hampshire, on November 23, 1859. He graduated from Bellows Falls High School in 1876 and started a career in business as a messenger with the American Express Company in Boston, Massachusetts. Babbitt became an agent for the company, and later an auditor, traveling between American Express locations from Boston to Burlington, Vermont.

After 16 years with American Express Babbitt resigned to enter the plumbing and heating business, operating stores in Bellows Falls, Vermont (Bellows Falls Plumbing & Heating) and Walpole, New Hampshire (Allbee & Babbitt). Babbitt also became President of Boston's Eastern Mineral Color Company, and Treasurer of the Ideal Wrapper Manufacturing Company in Bellows Falls. In addition, he operated the train station restaurants in Bellows Falls, White River Junction and St. Albans.

In the mid-1890s Babbitt and his brothers George H. and John E. Babbitt purchased the Robertson Paper Company of Bellows Falls and the Howland Pulp & Paper Company of Howland, Maine. They operated both companies for five years, after which they sold Howland Pulp & Paper. In addition, Frederick and John bought out George at Robertson Paper, of which Frederick became President and John Treasurer. Under their leadership Robertson Paper became the largest producer of waxed paper in the United States. Frederick Babbitt later left Robertson Paper to start another paper company, Babbitt & Kelley. (Herbert T. Kelley was the husband of Babbitt's daughter Madeline and served as the company's Secretary.)

A Republican, Babbitt served on numerous civic committees, and held several local government offices, including Village Trustee and Town Meeting Moderator. From 1910 to 1912 he served in the Vermont House of Representatives.

Babbitt served in the Vermont State Senate from 1912 to 1913 and was the Senate's President pro tem.

In 1920 Babbitt was an unsuccessful candidate for governor, losing the Republican nomination to James Hartness.

Babbitt was a prominent Mason, attaining the thirty-third degree of Scottish Rite Masonry and holding several leadership positions at the state and national levels.

Frederick H. Babbitt died in Boston on July 29, 1931.

Political offices
Preceded by Max L. Powell	President pro tempore of the Vermont State Senate; 1912–1913	Succeeded by Max L. Powell
