= Joseph H. Denny =

American politician

Joseph H. Denny (June 17, 1883 – January 20, 1962) was a Vermont businessman and politician who served as Speaker of the Vermont House of Representatives and President Pro Tem of the Vermont Senate.

== Biography ==
Joseph Harold Denny was born in Northfield, Vermont on June 17, 1883. He graduated from Norwich University in 1905, earning a Bachelor of Science degree in chemistry. After graduating from college Denny operated a Northfield grocery store and worked as a salesman for Fairbanks Scales. In 1910 he became active in the insurance business as the owner and operator of an agency in Northfield.

Denny also became active in banking, serving as President of the Northfield Trust Company.

A Republican, Denny served as Chairman of Northfield's School Board from 1929 to 1934. In 1932 he was elected to the Vermont House of Representatives and served two terms, 1933 to 1937.

Denny was elected to the Vermont Senate in 1938 and served two terms, 1939 to 1943. In 1941 he served as the Senate's President Pro Tem.

Denny was elected to the Vermont House for the second time in 1942 and served two terms, 1943 to 1947. From 1945 to 1947 he served as House Speaker. In 1946 Denny was a candidate for lieutenant governor, but withdrew before the primary election was held.

Denny died in Northfield on January 20, 1962. He was buried in Northfield's Mount Hope Cemetery.

Political offices
| Preceded by Asa S. Bloomer | Speaker of the Vermont House of Representatives; 1945–1947 | Succeeded by Winston L. Prouty |
| Preceded by Mortimer R. Proctor | President pro tempore of the Vermont State Senate; 1941 – 1943 | Succeeded by Lee E. Emerson |
