= John H. Bloomer =

American attorney and politician

John H. Bloomer (September 14, 1930 – January 10, 1995) was a Vermont attorney and politician who served as President of the Vermont State Senate.

== Biography ==
John Henry Bloomer was born in Rutland on September 14, 1930.

He served in the Army during the Korean War, entering the service in 1952 and attaining the rank of first lieutenant before receiving his discharge in 1954.

Bloomer graduated from the University of Vermont in 1952 and Boston University Law School in 1957. Bloomer resided in West Rutland, Vermont and practiced law in Rutland. He served in local offices including school board member.

A Republican, in 1984 Bloomer was elected to the Vermont Senate. In 1993 he was elected Senate President, a position in which he served until his death.

Bloomer died in Stockbridge on January 10, 1995 as the result of injuries sustained in a car accident. He was buried in Rutland's Evergreen Cemetery.

== Family ==
Bloomer's father Asa S. Bloomer and brother Robert A. Bloomer (1921–1999) both served in the Vermont Senate. Asa Bloomer was Speaker of the Vermont House of Representatives from 1943 to 1945 and served as Senate President in 1949 and 1955, and from 1959 until his death. Robert Bloomer served as Senate President from 1975 to 1985.

Judith Wener Bloomer Crowley (born 1936), the wife of John H. Bloomer and mother of John H. Bloomer Jr., served in the Vermont Senate from 1995 to 1997 and in the Vermont House from 2001 to 2005.

Bloomer's son John H. Bloomer Jr. (born 1960) served in the Vermont Senate from 1997 to 2005. In 2011 he was appointed Secretary of the Senate.

Political offices
Preceded by Doug Racine	President pro tempore of the Vermont State Senate; 1993–1995	Succeeded by Stephen W. Webster
