= Robert A. Bloomer =

American politician (1921–1999)

Robert A. Bloomer (November 13, 1921 – December 7, 1999) was a Vermont attorney and politician who served as President of the Vermont State Senate.

== Biography ==
Robert Asa Bloomer was born in Proctor, Vermont on November 13, 1921. Bloomer graduated from the University of Vermont in 1943 and served as a pilot in the Eighth Air Force of the U.S. Army Air Forces during World War II.

In 1947 Bloomer received his law degree from Boston University School of Law 1948, afterwards practicing law in Rutland.

A Republican, in 1963 Bloomer was appointed to the seat in the Vermont Senate that was left vacant by the death of his father, and completed his father's term. He was elected to a full term in 1964 and served until January, 1967.

In 1972 Bloomer was again elected to the Vermont Senate, and served from 1973 to 1985. From 1975 until retiring from the legislature Bloomer was the body's President Pro Tem.

After leaving the Senate Bloomer practiced law, was involved in several civic organizations, and served as Chairman of the District 1 Environmental Board.

Bloomer died in Rutland on December 7, 1999. He was buried in Rutland's Evergreen Cemetery.

== Family ==
Robert A. Bloomer's father Asa S. Bloomer and brother John H. Bloomer both served in the Vermont Senate. Asa Bloomer was Speaker of the Vermont House of Representatives from 1943 to 1945 and served as Senate President in 1949 and 1955, and from 1959 until his death. John H. Bloomer served as Senate President from 1993 to 1995.

Judith Wener Bloomer Crowley (born 1936), the wife of John H. Bloomer and mother of John H. Bloomer Jr., served in the Vermont Senate from 1995 to 1997 and in the Vermont House from 2001 to 2005.

John H. Bloomer Jr. (born 1960) served in the Vermont Senate from 1997 to 2005. In 2011 he was appointed Secretary of the Senate.

Political offices
| Preceded by Edward G. Janeway | President pro tempore of the Vermont State Senate; 1975 – 1985 | Succeeded by Peter Welch |
