= Samuel Hollister Jackson =

American politician

S. Hollister Jackson
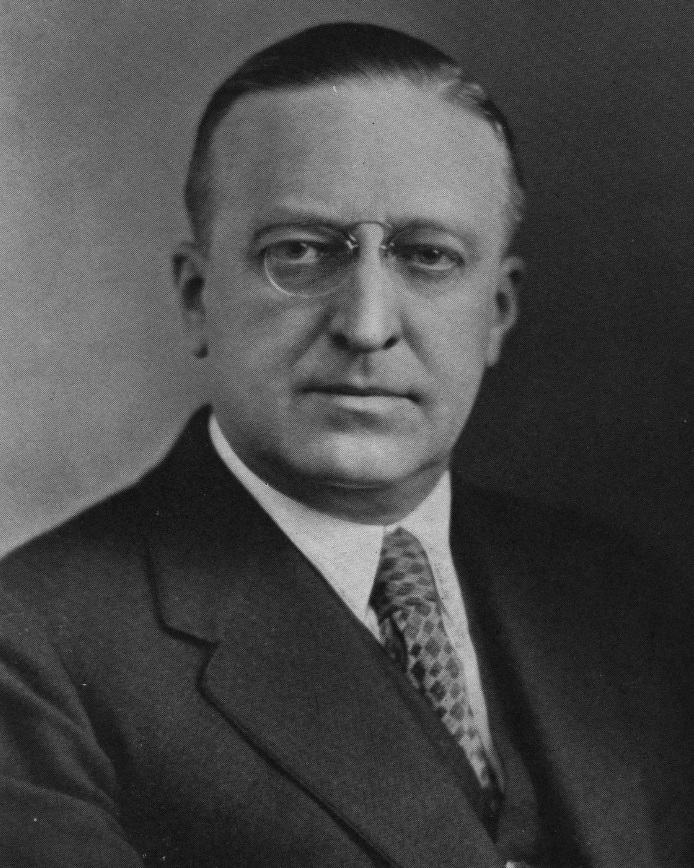
- Jackson circa 1927. Vermont Archive and Records Administration

56th Lieutenant Governor of Vermont
- In office January 6, 1927 – November 2, 1927
- Governor: John E. Weeks
- Preceded by: Walter K. Farnsworth
- Succeeded by: Stanley C. Wilson

President of the Vermont Bar Association
- In office 1926–1927
- Preceded by: J. Rolf Searles
- Succeeded by: James K. Batchelder (Acting)

Member of the Vermont House of Representatives from Barre City
- In office 1906–1907
- Preceded by: George H. Pape
- Succeeded by: George N. Tilden

State's Attorney of Washington County, Vermont
- In office 1904–1906
- Preceded by: John H. Senter
- Succeeded by: Benjamin Gates

Personal details
- Born: Samuel Hollister Jackson; December 7, 1875 Toronto, Canada
- Died: November 2, 1927 (aged 51) Barre, Vermont, US
- Resting place: Lakeview Cemetery, Burlington, Vermont
- Party: Republican
- Spouse: Mabel Maude Parkyn (m. 1909–1927, his death)
- Children: 2
- Parents: Samuel Nelson Jackson (father); Mary Ann Parkyn (mother)
- Relatives: H. Nelson Jackson (brother); John Holmes Jackson (brother)
- Education: University of Toronto; University of Vermont
- Profession: Attorney; Businessman

Military service
- Allegiance: United States
- Branch/service: United States Army
- Rank: Major
- Unit: Judge Advocate General Corps

Hollister Jackson (December 7, 1875 – November 2, 1927) was the 56th lieutenant governor of Vermont; he was killed in the Great Flood of 1927.

== Early life ==
Samuel Hollister Jackson was born in Toronto, Ontario, Canada on December 7, 1875, the son of Samuel Nelson Jackson and Mary Anne (Parkyn) Jackson. Jackson's siblings included H. Nelson Jackson, a prominent Burlington, Vermont businessman, and J. Holmes Jackson (1871–1944), who served as mayor of Burlington from 1917 to 1925 and 1929 to 1933.

Hollister Jackson attended the Collegiate Institute in Kingston, Ontario and Kingston's Queen's University. He received degrees from the University of Toronto (bachelor of music, 1896) and the University of Vermont (Bachelor of Arts, 1898). Jackson moved to Barre City, Vermont, where he supported his family by giving piano, organ and music composition lessons while studying law. He was admitted to the bar in 1900 and practiced in Barre City.

== Career ==
In 1901 he was elected Barre's Grand Juror (municipal court prosecutor) and he served as Washington County State's Attorney from 1904 to 1906, succeeding John H. Senter. He served in the Vermont House of Representatives from 1906 to 1907, and as a member of the state Railroad Commission (later called the Public Service Commission) from 1906 until 1913. He was also a major in the Army Reserve Judge Advocate General Corps.

Jackson was an owner of the E.L. Smith & Company granite manufacturing business, President of the Vermont Bar Association and the National Granite Producers' Association, and a member of the Masons, Shriners and Knights of Pythias.

== Election as lieutenant governor ==
In 1926 he was the successful Republican nominee for Lieutenant Governor and served from January 1927 until his death.

== Death ==
During the Great Vermont Flood on November 2, 1927, Jackson's car stalled after he hit a deep hole while attempting to drive through the rising Potash Brook near his home at Nelson and Tremont Streets in Barre. According to a witness, Jackson's hat and glasses were knocked off, and he appeared dazed. He began walking towards his house, and water rushing fast enough to cut a channel across Nelson Street (then a dirt road) carried him away. Those nearby attempted unsuccessfully to save him, as did a Vermont National Guard detachment. He drowned, and the next day his body was recovered from the Potash approximately a mile from where he was last seen.

== Burial ==
Jackson was buried in the family plot of William Wells at Lakeview Cemetery in Burlington. Hollister Jackson was the brother of H. Nelson Jackson, who was married to Wells's daughter Bertha.

== Family ==
In 1909, Jackson married Mabel Maude Parkyn (1874–1968), usually known as Maude. They were the parents of two sons, Nelson Parkyn Jackson (1910–1960) and Samuel Hollister Jackson (1916–1995).

== Photos ==
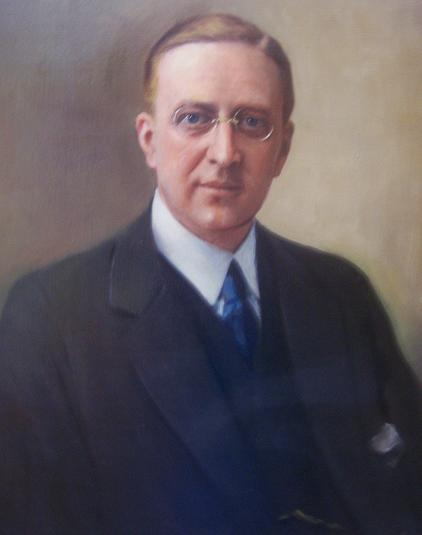
Portrait of Jackson on display in the lieutenant governor's office at the Vermont State House

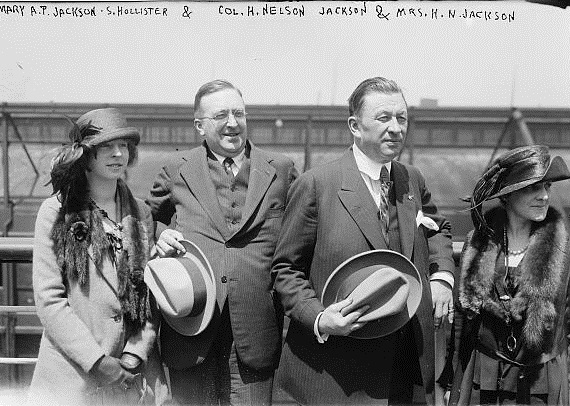
Hollister Jackson with his brother H. Nelson Jackson, Nelson Jackson's wife Bertha (right), and their niece Mary (left), 1922

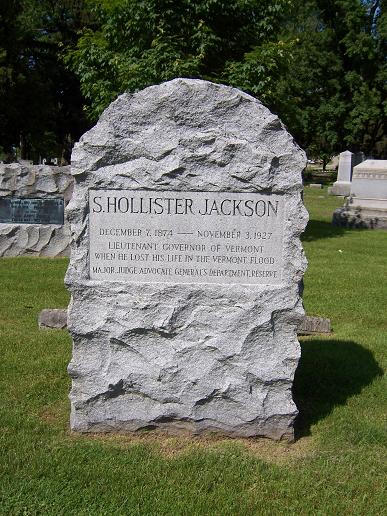
Grave marker, S. Hollister Jackson

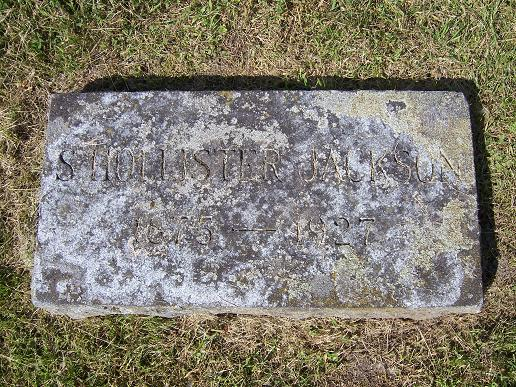
Individual gravestone, S. Hollister Jackson

Party political offices
Preceded by Walter K. Farnsworth	Republican nominee for Lieutenant Governor of Vermont; 1926	Succeeded by Stanley C. Wilson
Political offices
Preceded by Walter K. Farnsworth	Lieutenant Governor of Vermont; 1927–1927	Succeeded by Stanley C. Wilson
