= Senator Wilkinson (disambiguation) =

Morton S. Wilkinson (1819–1894) was a U.S. Senator from Minnesota from 1859 to 1865, also serving in the Minnesota State Senate. Senator Wilkinson may also refer to:

- A. H. Wilkinson (1875–1954), Wisconsin State Senate
- John Wilkinson (Georgia politician) (born 1955), Georgia State Senate
- Smith S. Wilkinson (1824–1889), Wisconsin State Senate

== See also ==
- Samuel Wilkeson (1781–1848), New York State Senate
- Senator Wilkerson (disambiguation)
- Senator Wilkins (disambiguation)
