= John Kimball (politician, born 1796) =

American politician (1796–1884)

President pro tempore of the Vermont Senate
- In office 1848–1849
- Preceded by: George T. Hodges
- Succeeded by: Oliver P. Chandler

Member of the Vermont Senate
- In office 1846–1849 Serving with Ebenezer Howe Jr., Austin Birchard (1846); Peter W. Dean, Larkin G. Mead (1848)
- Preceded by: William Harris, Samuel F. Thompson, Reuben Winn
- Succeeded by: Peter W. Dean, Frederick Holbrook, John Tufts
- Constituency: Windham County

Member of the Vermont House of Representatives
- In office 1864–1865
- Preceded by: Charles Shrigley
- Succeeded by: David R. Cobb
- In office 1856–1858
- Preceded by: Phineas D. Keyes
- Succeeded by: Aaron Hitchcock
- Constituency: Putney

State's Attorney of Windham County, Vermont
- In office 1843–1846
- Preceded by: Royall Tyler Jr.
- Succeeded by: Richard W. Smith

Member of the New Hampshire House of Representatives
- In office 1838–1839 Serving with Joel Wallingford, John H. Warland
- Preceded by: George B. Upham, Austin Tyler, Joel Wallingford
- Succeeded by: Erastus Glidden, John H. Warland, Charles L. Putnam
- Constituency: Claremont

Personal details
- Born: September 30, 1796 Haverhill, New Hampshire, U.S.
- Died: February 23, 1884 (aged 87) Putney, Vermont, U.S.
- Resting place: Maple Grove Cemetery, Putney, Vermont, U.S.
- Party: Whig; Republican
- Spouse: Frances Mary White (m. 1834)
- Children: 3
- Education: Dartmouth College
- Profession: Attorney; Politician

John Kimball (September 30, 1796 – February 23, 1884) was a New Hampshire and Vermont attorney and politician who served in the New Hampshire House of Representatives and the Vermont House of Representatives. He also served as President of the Vermont Senate.

== Biography ==
John Kimball was born in Haverhill, New Hampshire on September 30, 1796. He graduated from Kimball Union Academy and Dartmouth College (class of 1822), studied law with Moses P. Payson, and became an attorney in Claremont. A Whig, Kimball served in the New Hampshire House of Representatives from 1838 to 1839.

In 1839 Kimball relocated to Putney, Vermont, where he continued to practice law. From 1843 to 1846 he was Windham County State's Attorney.

From 1846 to 1849 Kimball served in the Vermont Senate. From 1848 to 1849 he was the Senate's President pro tem.

Now a Republican, Kimball served in the Vermont House of Representatives from 1856 to 1857, and again in 1864.

Kimball died in Putney on February 3, 1884. He was buried at Maple Grove Cemetery in Putney.

== Personal ==
In 1834 John Kimball married Frances Mary White, the daughter of Phineas White. They were the parents of three children, one of whom, Charles White Kimball (1836–1898), lived to adulthood.

Political offices
Preceded by George T. Hodges	President pro tempore of the Vermont State Senate; 1848 – 1849	Succeeded by Oliver P. Chandler
