= William R. Fairchild =

American politician

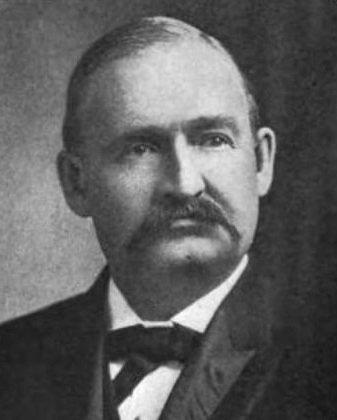
William H. Fairchild

William R. Fairchild (January 31, 1853 – May 8, 1929) was a Vermont politician, attorney and businessman who served as President of the Vermont Senate.

== Biography ==
William Russell Fairchild was born in Fairfield, Vermont on January 31, 1853. He attended Wesleyan University and Iowa State University, graduated from the University of Michigan Law School in 1877, and commenced practice in Fairfield. While in college, he became a member of the Psi Upsilon fraternity. Fairchild was also involved in various business enterprises, including working as an agent for the Vermont Mutual Fire Insurance Company.

A Republican, Fairchild served in several local offices including school board member, school superintendent, lister, town clerk, and town treasurer.

From 1888 to 1890, Fairchild served in the Vermont House of Representatives, and from 1890 to 1892, he served in the Vermont Senate. Fairchild served again in the Vermont House from 1915 to 1917.

In 1916, Fairchild was again elected to the Vermont Senate. He served from 1917 to 1919 and was the Senate's president pro tem.

Fairchild died in Fairfield on May 8, 1929.

Political offices
Preceded by Max L. Powell	President pro tempore of the Vermont Senate; 1917–1919	Succeeded by Martin S. Vilas
