= Carleton G. Howe =

American politician

President pro tempore of the Vermont Senate
- In office 1953–1955
- Preceded by: Merrill W. Harris
- Succeeded by: Asa S. Bloomer

Member of the Vermont Senate
- In office 1947–1959 Serving with Melford D. Bibens (1946), James B. Gibney (1948), Waldo C. Holden (1950), George M. Hawks (1952), T. Garry Buckley (1954, 1956)
- Preceded by: Norton Barber, Walter Hard
- Succeeded by: John B. Harte, George Van Santvoord
- Constituency: Bennington County

Member of the Vermont House of Representatives
- In office 1945–1947
- Preceded by: Harry Warner
- Succeeded by: Robert Warner
- Constituency: Dorset

Personal details
- Born: April 4, 1898 Cañon City, Colorado, US
- Died: September 21, 1993 (aged 95) Manchester, Vermont, US
- Resting place: Maple Hill Cemetery, Dorset, Vermont, US
- Party: Republican
- Spouse(s): Mary Louise Bacon; Dorothy Batchelder
- Children: 2
- Education: University of Illinois Urbana-Champaign
- Occupation: Orchardist

Military service
- Service: United States Navy
- Years of service: 1917–1919
- Rank: Ensign
- Unit: USS Pocahontas
- Wars: World War I

Carleton G. Howe (March 4, 1898 – September 21, 1993) was a Vermont orchardist and politician who served as President of the Vermont State Senate.

== Biography ==
Carleton Gibson Howe was born in Cañon City, Colorado on March 4, 1898. He was raised and educated in the Chicago area and served in the United States Navy during World War I, attaining the rank of ensign while serving aboard the transport ship USS Pocahontas.

In 1922 Howe graduated from the University of Illinois Urbana-Champaign. Howe settled in Dorset, Vermont, where he owned and operated a successful apple growing business.

A Republican, Howe served in the Vermont House of Representatives from 1945 to 1947. In 1946 he won election to the Vermont Senate, where he served from 1947 to 1959. From 1955 to 1957 Howe served as Senate President. Howe ran unsuccessfully for renomination to the State Senate in 1958.

Howe was a Delegate to the 1952 Republican National Convention, and he was an alternate delegate in 1956. In the late 1950s he served as Chairman of the Vermont Republican Party.

Howe died in Manchester on September 21, 1993. He was buried at Maple Hill Cemetery in Dorset.

Political offices
Preceded by Merrill W. Harris	President pro tempore of the Vermont State Senate; 1953 – 1957	Succeeded by Asa S. Bloomer
