= John E. Weeks =

American politician (1853–1949)

John Eliakim Weeks
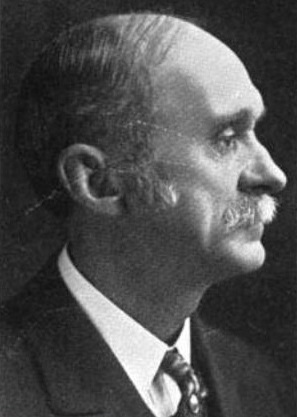

Member of the U.S. House of Representatives from Vermont's 1st district
- In office March 4, 1931 – March 3, 1933
- Preceded by: Elbert S. Brigham
- Succeeded by: Constituency abolished

61st Governor of Vermont
- In office January 6, 1927 – January 8, 1931
- Lieutenant: Hollister Jackson; Stanley C. Wilson
- Preceded by: Franklin S. Billings
- Succeeded by: Stanley C. Wilson

Vermont Commissioner of Public Welfare
- In office 1923–1926
- Preceded by: New position
- Succeeded by: William H. Dyer

Vermont Director of State Institutions
- In office 1917–1923
- Preceded by: New position
- Succeeded by: Position eliminated (Consolidated with Commissioner of Public Welfare)

Speaker of the Vermont House of Representatives
- In office 1915–1917
- Preceded by: Charles Albert Plumley
- Succeeded by: Stanley C. Wilson

Member of the Vermont House of Representatives
- In office 1912–1917
- Preceded by: Joseph Battell
- Succeeded by: Ira H. LaFleur
- Constituency: Middlebury
- In office 1888–1890
- Preceded by: Charles F. Kingsley
- Succeeded by: Horace P. Hulett
- Constituency: Salisbury

Member of the Vermont Senate
- In office 1896–1898 Serving with Ashbel A. Dean
- Preceded by: David Henry Lewis, William Nichols Platt
- Succeeded by: Millard F. Barnes, Gustavus R. Walker
- Constituency: Addison County

Assistant Judge of Addison County, Vermont
- In office 1892–1894 Serving with Emerson Holland (to 1894), Warren Barnes (1894)
- Preceded by: Moses B. Gove, W. Harrison Bingham
- Succeeded by: Henry R. Baldwin, Royal J. Flint

Personal details
- Born: John Eliakim Weeks; June 14, 1853 Salisbury, Vermont. U.S.
- Died: September 10, 1949 (aged 96) Middlebury, Vermont, U.S.
- Resting place: West Salisbury Cemetery, Salisbury, Vermont, U.S.
- Party: Republican
- Spouse: Hattie Jane Dyer (m. 1879)
- Profession: Banker; Businessman

John Eliakim Weeks (June 14, 1853 – September 10, 1949) was an American politician from Vermont. He served as the 61st governor of Vermont from 1927 to 1931.

== Early life ==
Weeks was born in Salisbury, Vermont, on June 14, 1853, the son of Ebenezer Weeks and Elizabeth (Dyer) Weeks. He attended the county schools and Middlebury High School. He married Hattie J. Dyer of Salisbury in 1879. She died in 1942, and they had no children.

== Career ==
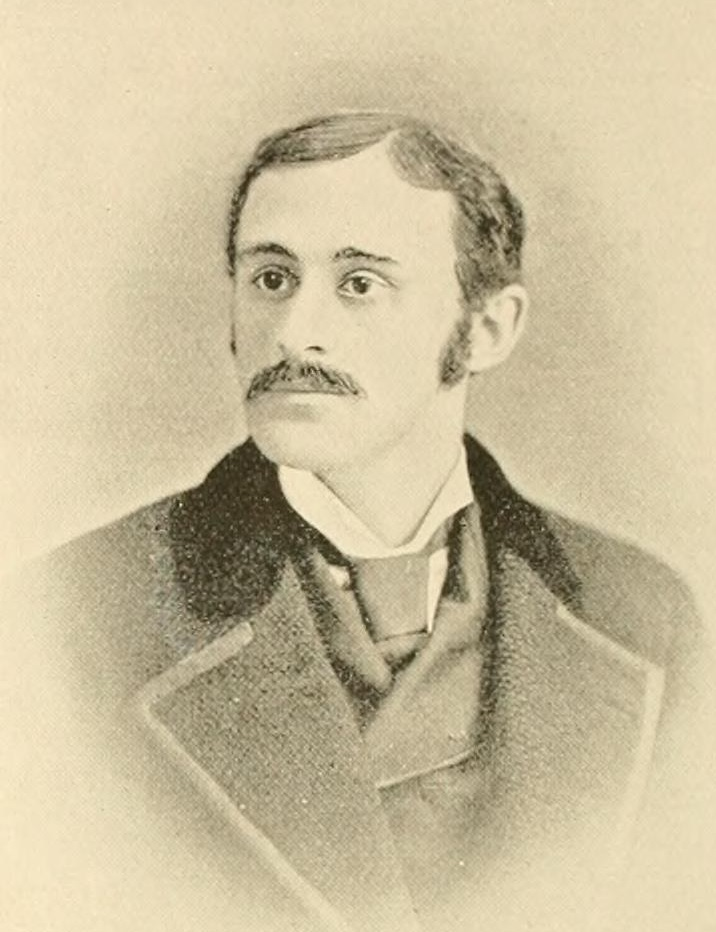
Weeks as depicted in 1894's Men of Vermont Illustrated.

Weeks operated a farm and operated several other businesses, including growing and selling hay, raising and selling livestock, selling insurance, and appraising and settling estates. He became president of the Addison County Trust Company and the Columbus Smith Trust Company, and served on the board of directors for both the Brandon National Bank and the National Bank of Middlebury.

A Republican, Weeks served as a member of the Vermont House of Representatives from 1888 to 1890. He served as Assistant Judge of Addison County from 1892 to 1894. He moved to Middlebury, Vermont in 1896 and that year was also elected to the Vermont State Senate. In 1896 he was also elected trustee of the state industrial school (later named the Weeks School). He returned to the Vermont House in 1912, and was Speaker from 1915 to 1917. Weeks became Director of State Institutions in 1917 and served until 1923. Weeks was Vermont's Commissioner of Public Welfare from 1923 to 1926.

Weeks was elected Governor in 1926. In 1928 he became the first Vermont Governor elected to a second two-year term, arguing that he should be given an exemption from the Republican Party's Mountain Rule in order to oversee efforts to recover from the great flood of 1927. Weeks served from January 6, 1927, to January 8, 1931. In addition to flood recovery efforts, the Weeks administration was marked by an average of forty-nine miles of road annually being paved on a pay-as-you-go basis.

In 1930, Weeks was elected to the United States House of Representatives from Vermont's 1st District. This district was scheduled to be eliminated due to redistricting, and incumbent Republican Elbert S. Brigham was not running for reelection. Weeks argued that serving one term and then retiring would be a fitting capstone to his career, and would ensure that two incumbent Republicans did not have to run against each other in a 1932 primary for Vermont's sole U.S. House seat. Weeks won the seat and served one term, 1931 to 1933. After serving in Congress, Weeks returned to his Middlebury business interests.

== Honors ==
Weeks was a longtime trustee of Middlebury College, from which he received the honorary degrees of M.A. in 1912 and LL.D. in 1927. In 1927, he received an honorary LL.D. from Norwich University.

== Death ==
Weeks died in Middlebury on September 10, 1949. At 96 years and 88 days, he remains the longest lived of all Vermont governors.

He is interred at West Salisbury Cemetery, Salisbury, Vermont.

Party political offices
Preceded by Franklin S. Billings	Republican nominee for Governor of Vermont; 1926, 1928	Succeeded by Stanley C. Wilson
Political offices
Preceded by Franklin S. Billings	Governor of Vermont; 1927–1931	Succeeded by Stanley C. Wilson
U.S. House of Representatives
Preceded by Elbert S. Brigham	U.S. Representative from Vermont's 1st district 1931–1933	Succeeded by Ernest Willard Gibson
