= President pro tempore of the Vermont Senate =

Position in the Vermont state senate

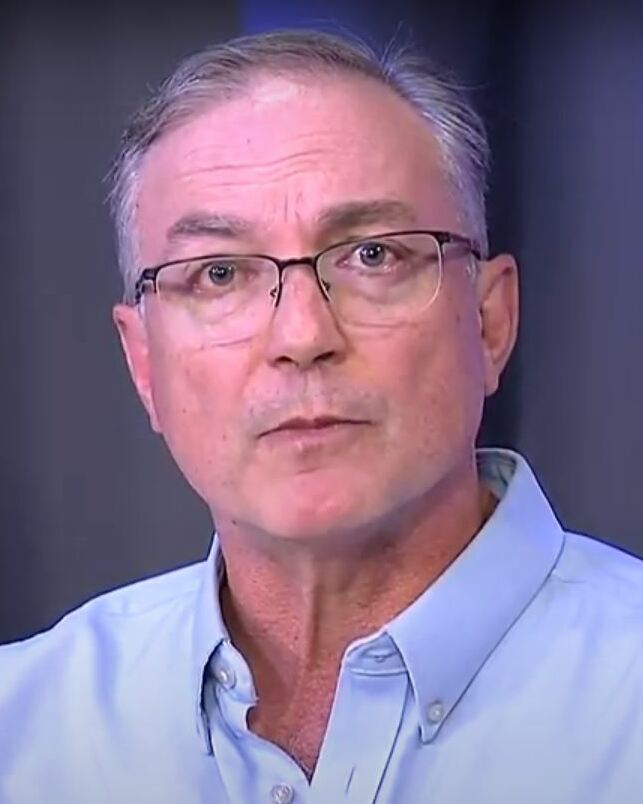
President pro tempore Philip Baruth

The president pro tempore of the Vermont Senate presides over the Senate of the U.S. state of Vermont in the absence of the lieutenant governor. The president pro tempore also sets the policy priorities and legislative agenda for the Senate.

== Duties ==
In addition to presiding in the absence of the lieutenant governor, the president pro tempore is third in the gubernatorial line of succession, following the lieutenant governor and speaker of the House of Representatives.

The Senate president pro tempore also serves as a member of the Senate's Committee on Committees. The Committee on Committees, made up of the lieutenant governor, president of the Senate, and a state senator chosen by his or her peers, is responsible for making committee assignments and designating committee chairpersons, vice chairpersons and clerks.

The Senate president is Senator Philip Baruth of Chittenden County, who took office on January 4, 2023.

== History ==
U.S. Senator Peter Welch served as Senate President from 1985 to 1989 and 2003 to 2007, and was the first Democrat to hold the post. Peter Shumlin, Governor from 2011 to 2017, was President pro tempore from 1997 to 2003 and 2007 to 2011. Becca Balint, Vermont's at-large member of the U.S. House since 2023, served as Senate President from 2021 to 2023.

In the early days of the Vermont Senate, when the legislature met for a relatively short time each year, the lieutenant governor was usually present to preside over regular Senate sessions, and temporary presidents would be chosen on an as-needed basis for periods as short as one day, or even just the morning or afternoon session of one day. By the 1870s, the position had evolved to the point where a permanent president pro tempore was chosen immediately after the convening of each new legislature.

From the founding of the Republican Party in the 1850s until the 1960s, only Republicans won statewide offices, and Republicans also controlled both the Vermont Senate and Vermont House of Representatives. As part of the party's Mountain Rule, the post of Senate President, along with that of House Speaker, were used to groom future governors and lieutenant governors. Including Shumlin, nine governors have served as Senate President (Eaton, Coolidge, Hendee, Redfield Proctor, McCullough, Prouty, Wills, Mortimer Proctor, Emerson, and Shumlin), as have six lieutenant governors who did not attain the governorship (Dale, Hinckley, Bates, Farnsworth, Babcock and Racine).

== Compensation ==
The president pro tempore of the Vermont Senate earned $10,080 in annual compensation as of 2005. Starting in 2007, the salary receives an annual cost of living adjustment.

== List ==
No.	President pro tempore	Term	Party
1	Horace Eaton	1841	Whig
2	Ebenezer N. Briggs	1843	Whig
3	James Barrett	1845	Whig
4	George T. Hodges	1846–1847	Whig
5	John Kimball	1848	Whig
6	Oliver P. Chandler	1849	Whig
7	William Weston	1850	Whig
8	Asa Wentworth Jr.	1851	Whig
9	Edward Seymour	1852	Whig
10	Orlando Stevens	1853	Whig
11	Carlos Coolidge	1853–1854	Whig
12	James M. Hotchkiss	1856	Republican
13	Augustus P. Hunton	1857	Republican
14	Lucius E. Chittenden	1857–1858	Republican
15	Bliss N. Davis	1859	Republican
16	George Wilkins	1860	Republican
17	Frederick E. Woodbridge	1861	Republican
18	Thomas E. Powers	1861	Republican
19	George F. Edmunds	1861–1862	Republican
20	Henry E. Stoughton	1863	Republican
21	Leverett B. Englesby	1864	Republican
22	Worthington C. Smith	1865	Republican
23	Seneca M. Dorr	1865–1866	Republican
24	George W. Hendee	1867–1868	Republican
25	George N. Dale	1869	Republican
26	Charles H. Heath	1870	Republican
27	Lyman G. Hinckley	1872	Republican
28	Redfield Proctor	1874	Republican
29	William W. Grout	1876	Republican
30	Loveland Munson	1878	Republican
31	Philip K. Gleed	1880	Republican
32	Justus Dartt	1882	Republican
33	Laforrest H. Thompson	1884	Republican
34	Henry C. Bates	1886–1888	Republican
35	Frank A. Dwinell	1890	Republican
36	Alfred A. Hall	1892	Republican
37	Frank Plumley	1894	Republican
38	Ashbel A. Dean	1896	Republican
39	John G. McCullough	1898	Republican
40	Frederick W. Baldwin	1900	Republican
41	Chauncey W. Brownell	1902	Republican
42	George H. Prouty	1904	Republican
43	William J. Van Patten	1906	Republican
44	Ernest W. Gibson Sr.	1908	Republican
45	Max L. Powell	1910	Republican
46	Frederick H. Babbitt	1912	Republican
47	Max L. Powell	1915	Republican
48	William R. Fairchild	1917	Republican
49	Martin S. Vilas	1919	Republican
50	Harvey R. Kingsley	1921	Republican
51	Walter K. Farnsworth	1923	Republican
52	Edward H. Edgerton	1925	Republican
53	Levi P. Smith	1927–1929	Republican
54	William H. Wills	1931	Republican
55	Charles B. Adams	1933	Republican
56	William H. Wills	1935	Republican
57	Ernest W. Dunklee	1937	Republican
58	Mortimer R. Proctor	1939	Republican
59	Joseph H. Denny	1941	Republican
60	Lee E. Emerson	1943	Republican
61	John A. M. Hinsman	1945	Republican
62	Carroll L. Coburn	1947	Republican
63	Asa S. Bloomer	1949	Republican
64	Merrill W. Harris	1951	Republican
65	Carleton G. Howe	1953	Republican
66	Asa S. Bloomer	1955	Republican
67	Robert S. Babcock	1957	Republican
68	Asa S. Bloomer	1959–1963	Republican
69	John H. Boylan	1963–1965	Republican
70	George W. F. Cook	1965–1969	Republican
71	Edward G. Janeway	1969–1975	Republican
72	Robert A. Bloomer	1975–1985	Republican
73	Peter Welch	1985–1989	Democratic
74	Douglas Racine	1989–1993	Democratic
75	John H. Bloomer	1993–1995	Republican
76	Stephen W. Webster	1995–1997	Republican
77	Peter Shumlin	1997–2003	Democratic
78	Peter Welch	2003–2007	Democratic
79	Peter Shumlin	2007–2011	Democratic
80	John F. Campbell	2011–2017	Democratic
81	Tim Ashe	2017–2021	Democratic/Progressive
82	Becca Balint	2021–2023	Democratic
83	Philip Baruth	2023–	Democratic/Progressive

== See also ==
- List of Vermont General Assemblies

== Sources ==
=== Internet ===
- Clerk of the Vermont House of Representatives (2011). "List of Presidents pro tempore of the Vermont Senate". leg.state.vt.us. Montpelier, VT: Vermont General Assembly.
- "Title 32, Chapter 015, Subchapter 002: Salaries and Fees, General Assembly". Vermont Statutes Online. Montpelier, VT: Vermont General Assembly. 2005.

=== Books ===
- Duffy, John J.; Hand, Samuel B.; Orth, Ralph H. (2003). The Vermont Encyclopedia. Hanover, NH: University Press of New England. ISBN 978-1-58465-086-7.
- Erickson, Nancy, Secretary of the U.S. Senate (2008). Pro Tem: Presidents Pro Tempore of the United States Senate Since 1789. Washington, DC: US Government Printing Office. ISBN 978-0-16-079984-6.
- Haider-Markel, Donald P. (2009). Political Encyclopedia of U.S. States and Regions. Washington, DC: CQ Press. ISBN 978-0-87289-377-1.
- Sharp, Nancy Weatherly; Sharp, James Roger (1997). American Legislative Leaders in the West, 1911-1994. Westport, CT: Greenwood Press. ISBN 978-0-313-30212-1.
- Vermont General Assembly (1836). Journal of the House of Representatives and Senate of the State of Vermont. Montpelier, VT: E. P. Walton & Sons. p. 10.
- Vermont General Assembly (1851). Journal of the House of Representatives and Senate of the State of Vermont. Burlington, VT: Chauncey Goodrich.
- Vermont General Assembly (1852). Journal of the House of Representatives and Senate of the State of Vermont. Rutland, VT: Tuttle & Co.
- Vermont General Assembly (1853). Journal of the House of Representatives and Senate of the State of Vermont. Rutland, VT: Tuttle & Co.
- Vermont General Assembly (1856). Journal of the House of Representatives and Senate of the State of Vermont. Montpelier, VT: E. P. Walton.
- Vermont General Assembly (1857). Journal of the House of Representatives and Senate of the State of Vermont. Woodstock, VT: Davis & Greene.
- Vermont General Assembly (1873). Journal of the House of Representatives and Senate of the State of Vermont. Montpelier, VT: Freeman Steam printing House and Bindery.
- Vermont General Assembly (1895). Journal of the House of Representatives and Senate of the State of Vermont. St. Albans, VT: St. Albans Messenger Co. p. 4.
- Vermont General Assembly (1908). Journal of the House of Representatives and Senate of the State of Vermont. St. Albans, VT: St. Albans Messenger Co.

=== Newspapers ===
- Walters, John (January 4, 2017). "Walters: Newly Elected Senate President Ashe Comes Out Swinging". Seven Days. Burlington, VT.
- "Balint nominated as first woman Senate President Pro Tempore". Vermont Business Magazine. South Burlington, VT. November 23, 2020.
