= George Wilkins (Vermont politician) =

American politician

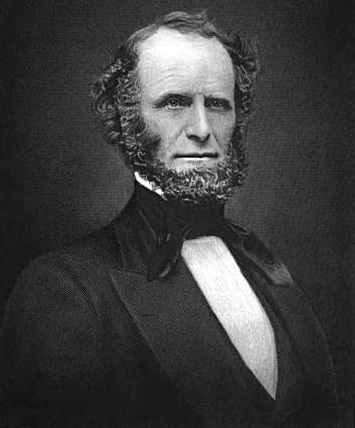
- From Volume 2 (1903) of Genealogical and Family History of the State of Vermont

President pro tempore of the Vermont Senate
- In office 1860–1861
- Preceded by: Bliss N. Davis
- Succeeded by: Frederick E. Woodbridge

Member of the Vermont Senate
- In office 1859–1861
- Preceded by: Thomas Gleed
- Succeeded by: Elisha Bentley
- Constituency: Lamoille County

State's Attorney of Lamoille County, Vermont
- In office 1851–1853
- Preceded by: W. H. H. Bingham
- Succeeded by: Thomas Gleed

Personal details
- Born: December 6, 1817 Stowe, Vermont, US
- Died: March 22, 1902 (aged 84) Stowe, Vermont, US
- Resting place: Riverbank Cemetery, Stowe, Vermont, US
- Party: Republican
- Spouse: Maria Nancy Wilson (m. 1846–1902)
- Children: 1
- Occupation: Attorney; Businessman

George Wilkins (December 6, 1817 – March 22, 1902) was a Vermont attorney and politician who served as President of the Vermont State Senate.

== Biography ==
Wilkins was born in Stowe, Vermont. He studied law, attained admission to the bar in 1841 and began a practice in Stowe.

Wilkins was also a successful businessman, with real estate holdings including more than 40 farms throughout Lamoille County. He was also a founder and member of the board of directors of the Lamoille County National Bank.

A Republican, Wilkins succeeded W. H. H. Bingham as Lamoille County State's Attorney in 1851 and he served until 1853.

In 1859 he was elected to one term in the Vermont Senate, and he served as President Pro Tem from 1860 to 1861.

Wilkins was a Delegate to the Republican National Conventions in 1864 and 1872. In 1868 he was a Republican Presidential Elector, and cast his ballot for Ulysses S. Grant.

Despite his advanced age, Wilkins was still maintaining an active law practice when he died in Stowe. Wilkins was buried at Riverbank Cemetery in Stowe.

== Family ==
In 1846, Wilkins married Maria Nancy Wilson. They were married until his death and were the parents of an adopted son, Charles B. Swift.

Political offices
Preceded by Bliss N. Davis	President pro tempore of the Vermont State Senate; 1860 – 1861	Succeeded by Frederick E. Woodbridge
