= Frank A. Dwinell =

American businessman and politician

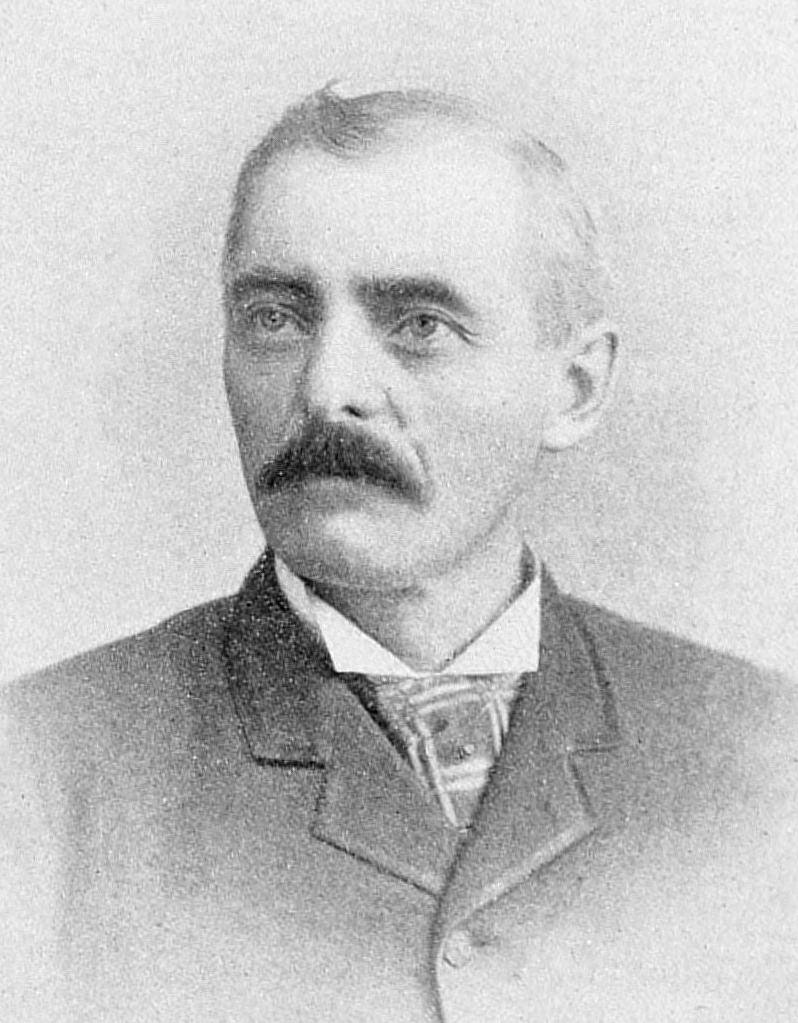

President pro tempore of the Vermont Senate
- In office 1890–1892
- Preceded by: Henry C. Bates
- Succeeded by: Alfred A. Hall

Member of the Vermont Senate
- In office 1890–1892 Serving with George W. Randall
- Preceded by: Fred E. Smith, Walter A. Jones
- Succeeded by: James W. Brock, Osmon B. Boyce
- Constituency: Washington County

Member of the Vermont House of Representatives
- In office 1878–1880
- Preceded by: Nathaniel Townsend
- Succeeded by: Dudley B. Smith
- Constituency: Plainfield

Personal details
- Born: May 23, 1848 East Calais, Vermont, U.S.
- Died: December 3, 1928 (aged 80) Montpelier, U.S.
- Resting place: Green Mount Cemetery, Montpelier, Vermont, U.S.
- Party: Republican
- Spouse: Hattie A. Hammett (m. 1870)
- Children: 2
- Education: Barre Academy
- Occupation: Store Owner; Insurance executive

Frank A. Dwinell (May 23, 1848 – December 3, 1928) was a Vermont businessman and politician who served as President of the Vermont State Senate.

== Biography ==
Dwinell was born in East Calais, Vermont on May 23, 1848, the son of Albert and Irene D. (Rich) Dwinell. He completed his education at Barre Academy, and began a business career in his father's East Calais store in 1868. In 1874 Dwinell moved to Plainfield, where operated his own store.

In 1885 Dwinell was an original incorporator of the Vermont office of the Farmers' Trust Company, and was chosen its President. In 1890 he relocated to Montpelier. Dwinell's other business interests included serving as a member of the board of directors for Montpelier's Wetmore & Morse Granite Company and First National Bank, and a Vice President of the Montpelier Building & Construction Company.

A Republican, Dwinell held several local offices in Plainfield, including Town Clerk and Treasurer. In 1878 he was elected to represent Plainfield in the Vermont House of Representatives. In 1890 he was elected to the Vermont Senate, and was chosen its President.

In 1898 Dwinell became a Loan Inspector for Montpelier's National Life Insurance Company. He later became Supervisor of the company's farm loans, a position in which he served until his death.

Dwinell died in Montpelier on December 3, 1928. He was buried at Green Mount Cemetery in Montpelier.

== Family ==
In 1870, Dwinell married Hattie A. Hammett. They were the parents of two sons Elbert Hammett and Melvin Raymond.

Political offices
Preceded by Henry C. Bates	President pro tempore of the Vermont Senate; 1890–1892	Succeeded by Alfred A. Hall
