= Martin S. Vilas =

American politician

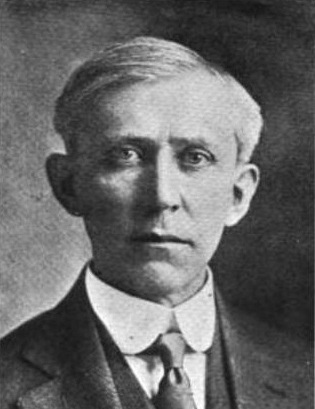

Martin Samuel Vilas (March 1, 1870 – November 19, 1953) was a Vermont lawyer, politician and author who served as President of the Vermont State Senate.

== Biography ==
Martin Samuel Vilas was born in Colchester, Vermont, on March 1, 1870. He graduated from the University of Vermont in 1894, studied at Harvard University, and received a Master of Arts degree from the University of Vermont in 1899. Vilas taught school and served as a school principal while studying law, and attained admission to the bar in 1902. He practiced in Burlington until 1912, when he relocated to the west coast, living first in California, and later in Washington. He returned to Vermont in 1915.

A Republican, Vilas served in several local offices, including Burlington City Attorney and Chairman of the Burlington Republican Party.

In 1916 Vilas was elected to the Vermont Senate. He served two terms, 1917 to 1921, and was Senate President from 1919 to 1921.

Vilas was an unsuccessful candidate for the United States House of Representatives (1926, 1930); Lieutenant Governor (1932); and the United States Senate (1938).

== Career as author ==
He wrote magazine articles and short stories on historical topics, many of which were printed in pamphlet or book form. His published works include: Charles Brockden Brown: A Study of Early American Fiction (1904); The Reorganization of the Republican Party, (1915); The Barbary Coast of San Francisco, (1915); Municipal Railway of San Francisco, (1915); and The Veterans of the National Soldiers' Home, (1915).

== Relatives ==
Vilas was the nephew of Levi Baker Vilas and cousin of William Freeman Vilas.

== Death ==
Martin S. Vilas died in Burlington on November 19, 1953.

Political offices
Preceded by William R. Fairchild	President pro tempore of the Vermont State Senate; 1919–1921	Succeeded by Harvey R. Kingsley
