= Reunion Society of Vermont Officers =

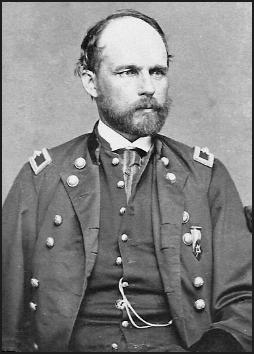
Brevet Major General George J. Stannard, first President of the Society.

The Reunion Society of Vermont Officers was an organization of American Civil War veterans.

== Founding ==
The Society was founded in 1864 by Union veterans from Vermont. Its original organizers included Redfield Proctor, George G. Benedict, and Wheelock G. Veazey.

== Membership ==
Membership was open to Union officer and noncommissioned officer veterans of the United States Army and Navy from Vermont and Union veterans who were natives of Vermont.

== Purpose ==
According to its constitution, the Reunion Society of Vermont Officers was founded to: create and sustain fraternal ties among Civil War veterans; record recollections of fallen comrades; recall and memorialize the events of the war; and remember and promote to succeeding generations the ideals of liberty and national honor which prompted members to fight in the Civil War.

== Activities ==
The Society met annually in the House of Representatives chamber of the Vermont State House to hear an oration on a historical Civil War-related topic. In addition, the group conducted an annual reunion, at different cities in the state, at which it elected officers for the upcoming year.

On two occasions during its existence the Society published the records of its annual proceedings, which included the text of its annual historical orations.

The Reunion Society also endeavored to collect images of every Vermonter who served as an officer in the Civil War, ultimately obtaining 859 photos of the 1363 officers, or 63%.

== Prominent members ==
Almost all prominent Vermonters who had served in the Civil War were members of the Society, including U.S. Senator Redfield Proctor, Interstate Commerce Commission member Wheelock G. Veazey, and Governors Peter T. Washburn, Roswell Farnham, John L. Barstow, Samuel E. Pingree, Ebenezer J. Ormsbee, Urban A. Woodbury, Josiah Grout, and Charles J. Bell.

== Political influence ==
Vermont elected only Republicans to statewide office from the party's founding in the 1850s through the 1960s, a legacy largely possible in the second half of the 19th century because of the party's support among Union veterans. Among the earliest members who were prominent in government were Redfield Proctor and Wheelock G. Veazey, who used loyalty among Civil War veterans as a base of political support to attain prominence in the Republican Party.

One of the Vermont Republican party's devices for maintaining order and avoiding primary elections was to restrict governors to two one-year terms. When two-year terms were introduced, the party limited governors to a single term. Another party device was the "Mountain Rule". Under the provisions of the Mountain Rule, one U.S. Senator was a resident of the east side of the Green Mountains and one resided on the west side, and the governorship and lieutenant governorship alternated between residents of the east and west side. These provisions were made possible in large part because members of the Reunion Society who were likely candidates for office agreed to abide by them in the interests of party unity.

== Termination of activity ==
Membership in the society dwindled as Union veterans aged and died, but it remained active at least until 1915.

== Partial list of presidents and years of election ==
- George J. Stannard, 1865
- William Y. W. Ripley, 1867
- Samuel E. Pingree, 1868
- William Wells, 1869
- George P. Foster, 1871
- Stephen Thomas, 1872
- William W. Henry, 1873
- Wheelock G. Veazey, 1874
- Perley P. Pitkin, 1875
- William W. Grout, 1876
- George W. Hooker, 1877
- Amasa S. Tracy, 1878
- George Nichols, 1880
- John B. Mead, 1880
- John L. Barstow, 1882
- James Stevens Peck, 1882
- Thomas O. Seaver, 1883
- William C. Holbrook, 1884
- Aldace F. Walker, 1885
- Roswell Farnham, 1886
- Edward H. Ripley, 1887
- Zophar M. Mansur, 1888
- F. Stewart Stranahan, 1889
- Joel C. Baker, 1890
- Urban A. Woodbury, 1891
- Josiah Grout, 1892
- Alonzo B. Valentine, 1893
- Edwin M. Haynes, 1894
- Henry A. Fletcher, 1895
- James H. Walbridge, 1896
- Frank G. Butterfield, 1897
- Zophar M. Mansur, 1898
- Frederick E. Smith, 1899
- Ebenezer J. Ormsbee, 1900
- Stephen F. Brown, 1901
- Kittredge Haskins, 1902
- George G. Benedict, 1903
- Edward H. Ripley, 1904
- Albert Clarke, 1905
- Lewis A. Grant, 1906
- Hugh Henry, 1907
- Andrew C. Brown, 1908, 1909
- Cassius Peck, 1910
- Joseph H. Goulding, 1912
- Justus Dartt, 1913

== Resources ==
- Proceedings of the Reunion Society of Vermont Officers, Volume I, 1864-1885. Published by the society. 1886.
- Proceedings of the Reunion Society of Vermont Officers, Volume II, 1886-1905. Published by the society. 1906.
