= 1894 Vermont gubernatorial election =

- September 4, 1894
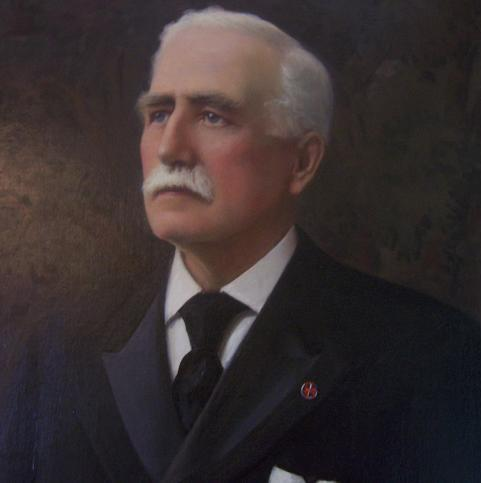

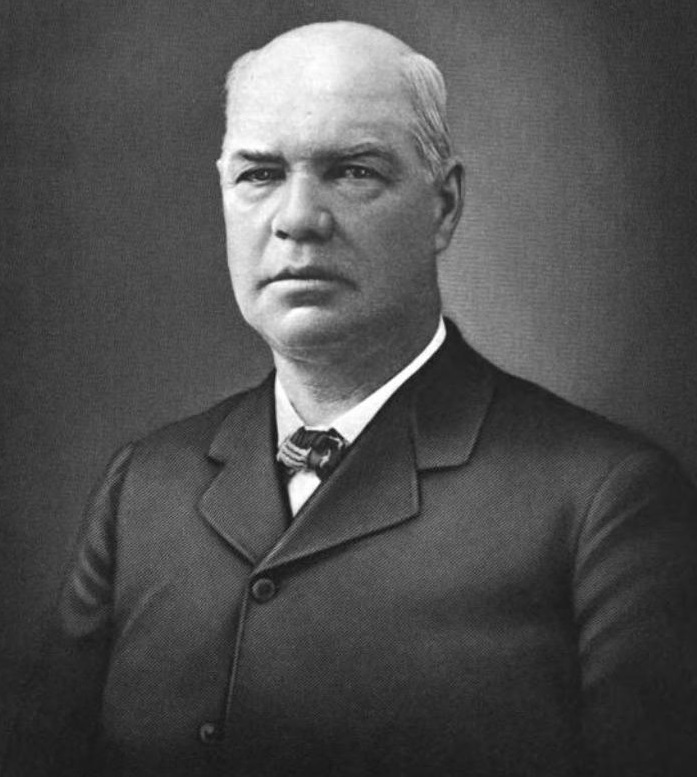
Nominee	Urban A. Woodbury	George W. Smith
Party	Republican	Democratic
Popular vote	42,663	14,142
Percentage	73.54%	24.38%
- County results Woodbury: 60–70% 70–80% 80–90%
Governor before election
Levi K. Fuller
Republican
Elected Governor
Urban A. Woodbury
Republican

The 1894 Vermont gubernatorial election took place on September 4, 1894. Incumbent Republican Levi K. Fuller, per the "Mountain Rule", did not run for re-election to a second term as Governor of Vermont. Republican candidate Urban A. Woodbury defeated Democratic candidate George W. Smith to succeed him.

== General election ==
=== Candidates ===
- T. S. McGinnis (People's)
- George W. Smith, White River Junction bank president and businessman (Democratic)
- Rodney Whittemore (Prohibition)
- Urban A. Woodbury, former Lieutenant Governor and mayor of Burlington (Republican)

=== Results ===
1894 Vermont gubernatorial election
Party	Candidate	Votes	%	±%
Republican	Urban A. Woodbury	42,663	73.54	
Democratic	George W. Smith	14,142	24.38	
Populist	T. S. McGinnis	740	1.27	
Prohibition	Rodney Whittemore	457	0.79	
N/A	Other	13	0.02	
Total votes		58,015	100.0	
