= 1898 Vermont gubernatorial election =

- September 6, 1898
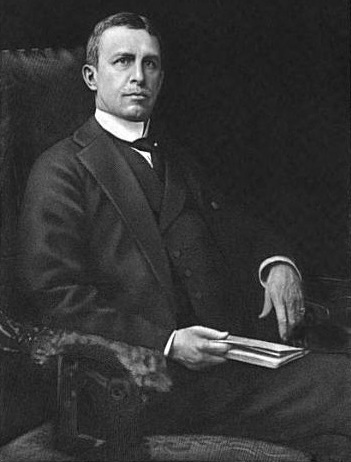

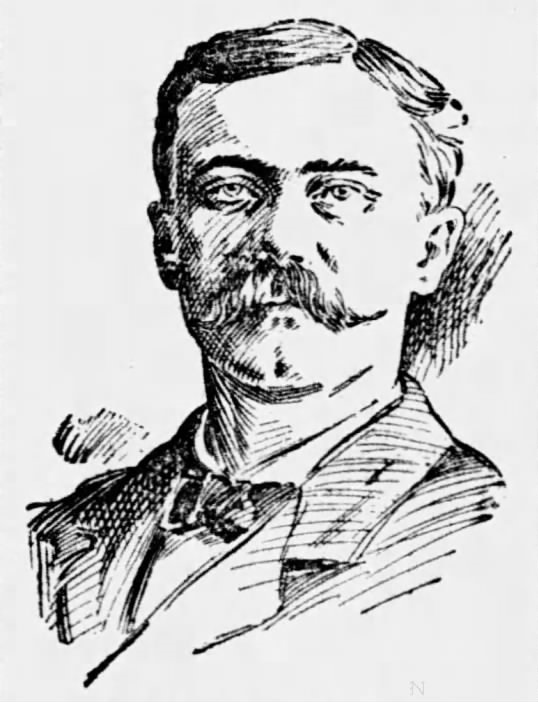
Nominee	Edward C. Smith	Thomas W. Moloney
Party	Republican	Democratic
Popular vote	38,555	14,686
Percentage	70.95%	27.03%
- County results Smith: 60–70% 70–80% 80–90%
Governor before election
Josiah Grout
Republican
Elected Governor
Edward C. Smith
Republican

The 1898 Vermont gubernatorial election took place on September 6, 1898. Incumbent Republican Josiah Grout, per the "Mountain Rule", did not run for re-election to a second term as Governor of Vermont. Republican candidate Edward C. Smith defeated Democratic candidate Thomas W. Moloney to succeed him.

== General election ==
=== Candidates ===
- Thomas W. Moloney (Democratic)
- Edward Curtis Smith, former State Representative from St. Albans Town (Republican)
- Cyrus W. Wyman (Prohibition)

=== Results ===
1898 Vermont gubernatorial election
Party	Candidate	Votes	%	±%
Republican	Edward C. Smith	38,555	70.95	
Democratic	Thomas W. Moloney	14,686	27.03	
Prohibition	Cyrus W. Wyman	1,075	1.98	
N/A	Other	21	0.04	
Total votes		54,337	100.0	
