= 1892 Vermont gubernatorial election =

- September 6, 1892
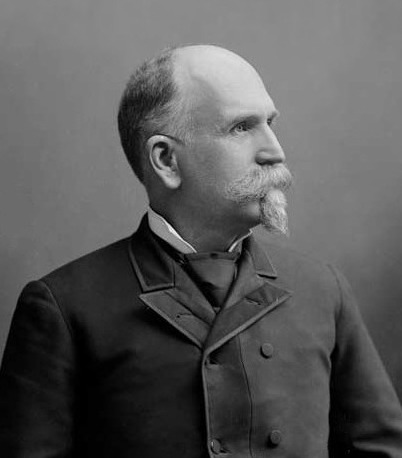

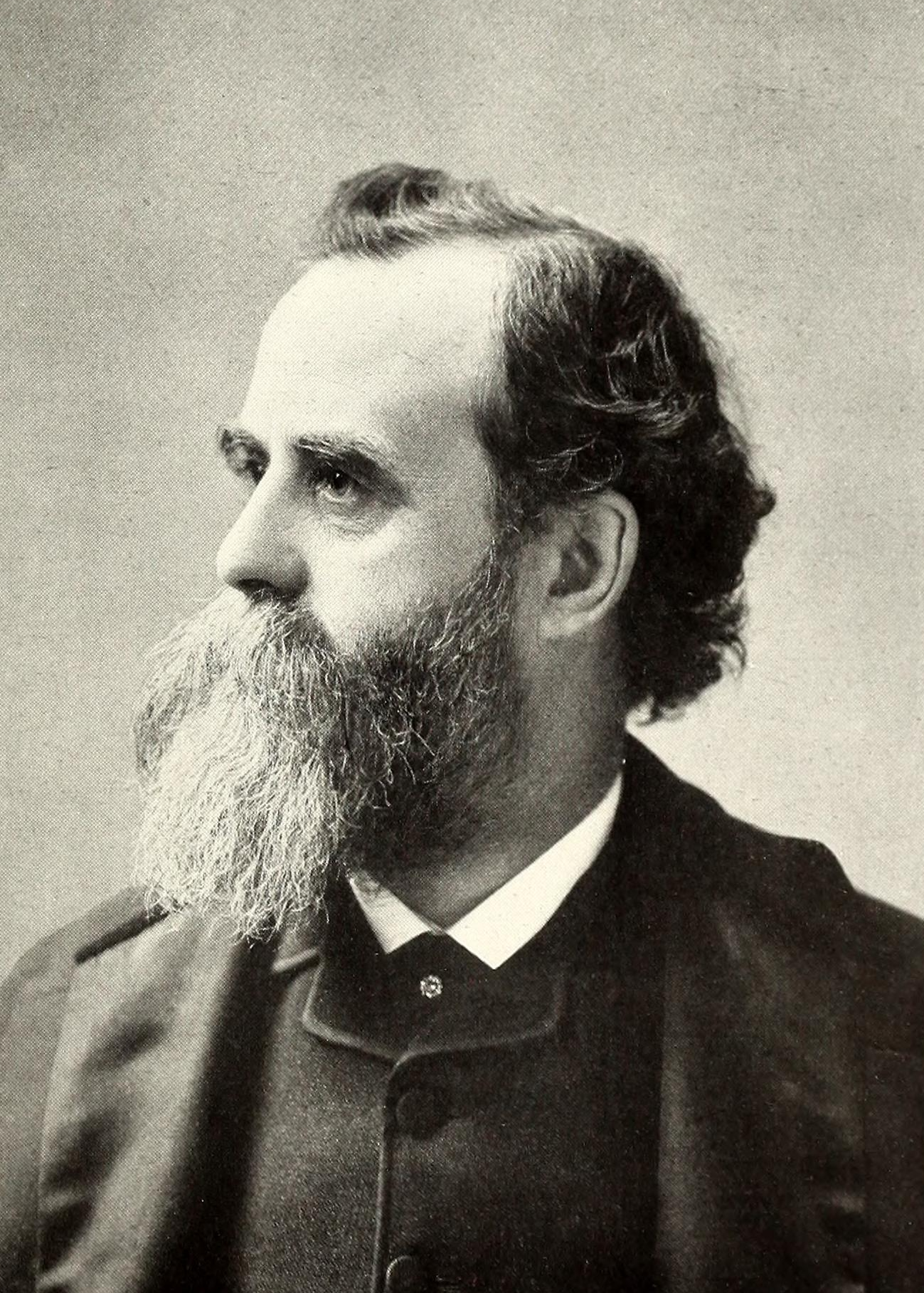
Nominee	Levi K. Fuller	Bradley Smalley
Party	Republican	Democratic
Popular vote	38,918	19,216
Percentage	64.99%	32.09%
- County results Fuller: 50–60% 60–70% 70–80% 80–90%
Governor before election
Carroll S. Page
Republican
Elected Governor
Levi K. Fuller
Republican

The 1892 Vermont gubernatorial election took place on September 6, 1892. Incumbent Republican Carroll S. Page, per the "Mountain Rule", did not run for re-election to a second term as Governor of Vermont. Republican candidate Levi K. Fuller defeated Democratic candidate Bradley Smalley to succeed him.

== Results ==
1892 Vermont gubernatorial election
Party	Candidate	Votes	%
Republican	Levi K. Fuller	38,918	64.99
Democratic	Bradley Smalley	19,216	32.09
Prohibition	Edward L. Allen	1,525	2.55
Write-in		221	0.37
Total votes		59,880	100.00

== Works cited ==
- "1892 Gubernatorial Election". Secretary of State of Vermont. Archived from the original on February 8, 2025.
