= Governor Woodbury =

Governor Woodbury may refer to:

- Levi Woodbury (1789–1851), 9th Governor of New Hampshire
- Urban A. Woodbury (1838–1915), 45th Governor of Vermont
