= Elizabeth Hubbell Fisk =

American textile maker from Vermont

- Born: August 31, 1859; Chazy, New York
- Died: 1927 (aged 67–68)
- Known for: Fisk Looms

Elizabeth Hubbell Fisk (1859 – 1927) was a Vermont textile maker known for repopularizing a Colonial-era style of rug making and creating a cottage industry in northern Vermont.

== Early life and education ==
Fisk was born second daughter of eleven children born to Margaret and John Hubbell of Chazy, New York. In 1880, she married Nelson W. Fisk, the son of a quarry owner from Isle La Motte, Vermont. The couple spent winters in New York City where Fisk studied art and dye chemistry at Pratt Institute and studied art with the painter William Merritt Chase.

She began to create hooked rugs at home, getting taught the basics by the older women in the town, raising funds for the Methodist church and the town library. Some reports say she was inspired to this path from finding an old loom in her home's attic. As her livelihood progressed, she was always looking for old looms and frames in the region's barns, sheds, and attics, many having been no longer used after the Industrial Revolution.

Fisk partnered with Anna Bailey Smith, the wife of Vermont governor Edward Curtis Smith. Smith introduced Fisk to other dyeing options and encouraged Fisk to experiment with colors and move on from simple rugs to more complex textiles. She also brought Fisk's work to a larger audience, writing about her in Ladies' Home Journal in 1923. Fisk branched out into creating other domestic household textiles primarily in linen including bedspreads, table runners, pillow cases, placemats, and curtains. Hand-woven linen was a rarity by the end of the 1800s. She created weaving techniques that produced designs on both sides of the woven fabrics so that "[I]t was nearly impossible to tell the right from the wrong side." Her designs were "symmetrical and centrally balanced and featured natural motifs like flowers, plants, and animals."

== Elizabeth Fisk Looms ==
Fisk originally had encouraged other local women to create their own textile products which could bring in money. She created Elizabeth Fisk Looms, a cottage industry for a small group of women weavers. The company consisted of two studios, one in Isle la Motte and one in nearby St. Albans (run by Smith) beginning in 1910. Designs for patterns were always original and were created with a customer's specific color palette in mind. A sign outside the St. Albans studio read "Linen Weaving. Original Designs in Color." The textiles were popular in their time, being exhibited around the United States. Fisk Looms created a Vermont coat of arms which was presented to the General Federation of Women's Clubs in Washington D.C. A duplicate of this weaving hung in the Vermont State House. The Chicago Art Institute awarded her a bronze medal along with a "purse of gold.".

Fisk died in 1927, leaving the looms to her workers who formed a guild and continued to work and publicize their techniques. Fisk Looms continued to thrive for another seven years, finally closing in 1935 after the death of Smith and the scarcity of raw materials during World War II. Textiles that these looms created are in collections such as The University of Vermont's Fleming Museum and the collections of the Vermont Historical Society.
