= Henry A. Fletcher =

American politician

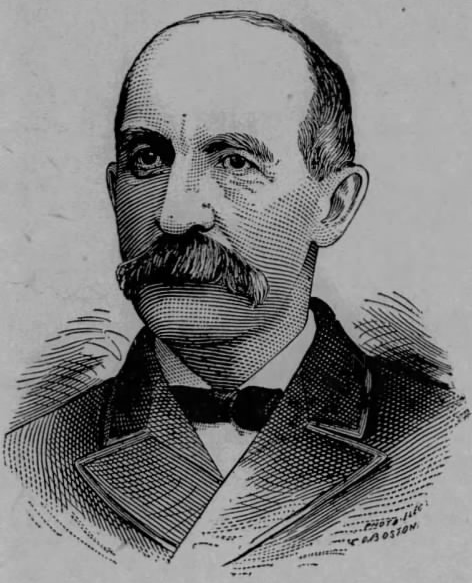
- Burlington Clipper (Burlington, VT), July 17, 1890

38th Lieutenant Governor of Vermont
- In office October 2, 1890 – October 6, 1892
- Governor: Carroll S. Page
- Preceded by: Urban A. Woodbury
- Succeeded by: Farrand Stewart Stranahan

Member of the Vermont State Senate from Windsor County
- In office 1886–1888 Serving with Chester Pierce, Daniel L. Cushing
- Preceded by: Norman Paul, Rollin Amsden, Elwin A. Howe
- Succeeded by: William E. Johnson, Marsh O. Perkins, Henry J. Parker

Member of the Vermont House of Representatives from Cavendish
- In office 1878–1884
- Preceded by: Daniel W. Hazelton
- Succeeded by: Nelson G. Piper
- In office 1867–1869
- Preceded by: Josiah Gilson
- Succeeded by: Horatio S. Pierce

Personal details
- Born: December 11, 1839 Cavendish, Vermont, US
- Died: April 19, 1897 (aged 57) Cavendish, Vermont, US
- Resting place: Cavendish Village Cemetery, Cavendish, Vermont, US
- Party: Republican
- Profession: Farmer

Military service
- Allegiance: United States
- Branch/service: Union Army
- Years of service: 1862-1863
- Rank: Second Lieutenant
- Unit: 16th Vermont Infantry
- Battles/wars: American Civil War

Henry Addison Fletcher (December 11, 1839 – April 19, 1897) was an American Civil War veteran, a farmer and a U.S. politician of the Republican Party. He is most notable for his service as the 38th lieutenant governor of Vermont from 1890 to 1892.

== Early life ==
Fletcher was born in Cavendish, Vermont on December 11, 1839, the son of Ryland Fletcher and Mary (May) Fletcher. Fletcher was the son and grandson of prominent Vermont politicians; his father was both the Lieutenant Governor (1854–1856) and the Governor (1856–1858) of Vermont. His grandfather, Asaph Fletcher, was a member of the convention which applied to Congress for the admission of Vermont into the Union, and served for several sessions in the Vermont Legislature, was a county judge and presidential elector.

Henry Fletcher grew up on his family's farm in Cavendish, and was educated in the local schools before attending Chester and Black River Academies. After completing his education, Fletcher became a farmer in Cavendish.

== Civil War ==
On August 29, 1862, Fletcher enlisted in the Union Army for the American Civil War and was mustered in as second sergeant of Company C, 16th Vermont Infantry, a unit of the 2nd Vermont Brigade. He was promoted to first sergeant on October 23, 1862, and regimental sergeant major on March 9, 1863. Fletcher was commissioned as a second lieutenant in Company C on April 23, 1863, to date from April 2. He took part in all the 16th Vermont's engagements, including the Battle of Gettysburg, and mustered out when the regiment's enlistments expired on August 10, 1863. After the war, Fletcher was a member of the Grand Army of the Republic, the Reunion Society of Vermont Officers, and other veterans organizations.

== Postwar life ==
After the war, Fletcher owned and operated the farm that had started by his grandfather. A Republican, he represented his hometown in the Vermont House of Representatives in 1867, 1868, 1878, 1880 and 1882, and represented Windsor County in the Vermont Senate in 1886. During his legislative career, his committee assignments included banking, railroads, revision of laws, and general affairs.

When Redfield Proctor served as governor from 1878 to 1880, Fletcher served on his military staff as aide-de-camp with the rank of colonel.

In 1890, Fletcher was elected lieutenant governor, and he served from 1890 to 1892, the one term available under the Republican Party's "Mountain Rule". In 1892, Fletcher was a candidate for governor, but lost the Republican nomination to Levi K. Fuller at that year's state party convention. After leaving office, Fletcher continued to operate his farm in Cavendish.

== Family ==
Fletcher never married and had no children.

== Death and burial ==
Fletched died of Bright's disease in Cavendish on April 19, 1897. He was buried at Cavendish Village Cemetery.

== See also ==
- Vermont in the Civil War

== Sources ==
=== Newspapers ===
- "Henry A. Fletcher of Cavendish: The Republican Nominee for Lieutenant Governor". Burlington Clipper. Burlington, VT. July 17, 1890 – via Newspapers.com.
- "Republican Convention: Fuller and Stranahan Head the Ticket". Burlington Clipper. Burlington, VT. June 23, 1892 – via Newspapers.com.
- "Death Notice, Henry A. Fletcher". St. Johnsbury Caledonian. St. Johnsbury, VT. April 23, 1897 – via Newspapers.com.
- "Funeral Notice, Henry A. Fletcher". The Argus and Patriot. Montpelier, VT. April 28, 1897 – via Newspapers.com.

=== Books ===
- Peck, Theodore S. (1892). Revised Roster of Vermont Volunteers and Lists of Vermonters who Served in the Army and Navy of the United States During the War of the Rebellion. Montpelier, VT: Watchman Publishing Co.
- Reunion Society of Vermont Officers (1906). Proceedings of the Reunion Society of Vermont Officers. Vol. 2. Burlington, VT: Free Press Printing Company.
- Ullery, Jacob G. (1894). Men of Vermont Illustrated. Brattleboro, VT: Transcript Publishing Company. p. 140.

Party political offices
Preceded by Urban A. Woodbury	Republican nominee for Lieutenant Governor of Vermont; 1890	Succeeded by Farrand Stewart Stranahan
Political offices
Preceded by Urban A. Woodbury	Lieutenant Governor of Vermont; 1890–1892	Succeeded by F. Stewart Stranahan
