= S. R. Smith =

S. R. Smith may refer to:

- Samuel Rodmond Smith (1841–1912), American soldier and municipal mayor
- Samuel Roger Smith (1853–1916), American college president
- S. R. Smith (golfer), winner of the 1916 Pacific Northwest Amateur
