= Governor Fuller =

Governor Fuller may refer to:

- Alvan T. Fuller (1878–1958), 50th Governor of Massachusetts
- Levi K. Fuller (1841–1896), 44th Governor of Vermont
