= Eastman Business College =

Former college in Poughkeepsie, New York

The Eastman Business College was a business college located in Poughkeepsie, New York, United States. It operated from 1859 until 1931. At the height of its success, the school was one of the largest commercial colleges in the United States.

== History ==
The diploma awarded by Eastman Business College

Eastman Business College was founded in 1859 by Harvey G. Eastman in Poughkeepsie, New York. Rather than merely being a theoretical school, students gained practical experience in the business arts by actually performing the tasks that would be expected of them in their working careers, a novel approach at the time.

In 1897, Eastman Business College had a business department that offered hands-on practice in a mock bank and mock railway and express office and also taught bookkeeping. The college also included a school of shorthand which trained students in shorthand, typing, duplicating, and filing. In addition, there was a school of penmanship, which prepared students to teach writing and pen art. The school of telegraphy trained students as telegraph operators.

Information in the 1898 catalogs of the Eastman Business College and its affiliated school, the New York Business Institute included this statement: "These schools do not receive students of the Negro Race". In 1905 Christopher V. Daniel, a 17-year-old from St. Thomas, Virgin Islands withdrew from the main college and transferred to the Harlem branch following the petition of 160 southern students alleging that he was partially of African descent.

During its most successful period in the late 1800s and early 1900s, Eastman was one of the largest commercial schools in the United States. The college closed on June 10, 1931.

== Notable alumni ==
- Martin F. Allen, Vermont politician
- Jefferson Randolph Anderson, attorney
- Dwight L. Burgess, Wisconsin politician
- Harry C. Bentley, founder of Bentley University
- Ernest Cady, Lieutenant Governor of Connecticut
- Edmund Elisha Case, painter
- LeRoy Collins, Governor of Florida
- Porter Dale, United States Senator from Vermont
- Henry T. DeBardeleben, coal magnate
- Henry S. De Forest, United States Representative from New York
- Nelson W. Fisk, Vermont businessman and Lieutenant Governor
- Obadiah Gardner, United States Senator from Maine
- Thomas Goldie, Canadian politician
- Henry Mayer Halff, rancher
- William P. G. Harding, banker
- Robert Henry Hendershot, American Civil War drummer boy
- Mark C. Honeywell, US electronics industrialist; founder, President and CEO of Honeywell International
- John L. Jolley, United States Congressman from South Dakota
- Mahlon Kline, pharmaceutical executive
- Joseph B. Keeler, Brigham Young University faculty member
- S. S. Kresge, retail businessman
- Monroe Henry Kulp, United States Representative from Pennsylvania
- Lorenzo D. Lewelling, 12th Governor of Kansas
- John Hamilton Morgan, LDS official
- John M. Parker, Governor of Louisiana from 1920 to 1924
- Edmund Platt, United States Representative from New York
- John Reber, United States Representative from Pennsylvania
- Daniel Elmer Salmon, veterinary surgeon
- Samuel Roger Smith, founder of Messiah College
- Reuben L. Snowe, Maine politician
- Calvert Spensley, Wisconsin politician
- Thomas Bahnson Stanley, Governor of Virginia
- Nelson Story, Montana pioneer
- James E. Towner, New York politician
- Murray Vandiver, Maryland politician
- Frank B. Weeks, Governor of Connecticut
- Homer W. Wheeler, U.S. Army officer and author
- Timothy Woodruff, United States Congressman and Lieutenant Governor of New York
- William Ziegler, industrialist

== See also ==
- List of defunct colleges and universities in New York
