= 1896 Vermont gubernatorial election =

- September 1, 1896
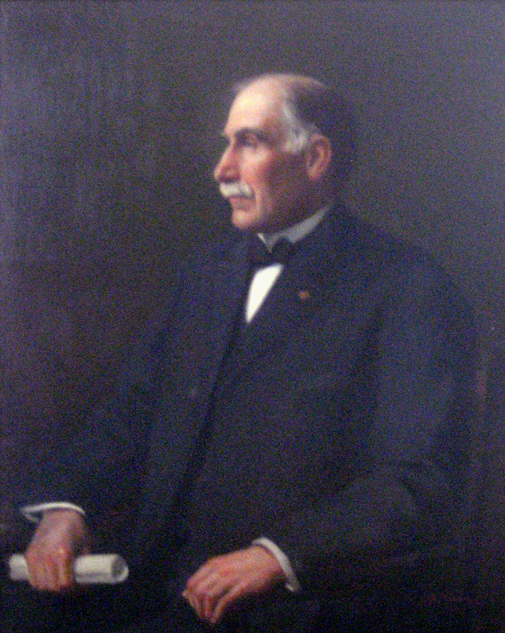

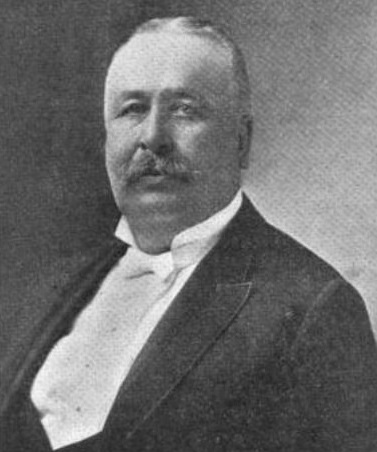
Nominee	Josiah Grout	J. Henry Jackson
Party	Republican	Democratic
Popular vote	53,426	14,855
Percentage	76.41%	21.24%
- Grout: 40–50% 50–60% 60–70% 70–80% 80–90% 90-100% Jackson: 50–60% 70–80% No Vote/Data
Governor before election
Urban A. Woodbury
Republican
Elected Governor
Josiah Grout
Republican

The 1896 Vermont gubernatorial election took place on September 1, 1896. Per the "Mountain Rule", incumbent Republican Urban A. Woodbury did not run for re-election to a second term as Governor of Vermont. Republican candidate Josiah Grout defeated Democratic candidate J. Henry Jackson to succeed him.

== General election ==
=== Candidates ===
- Joseph Battell, publisher of the Middlebury Register and philanthropist (People's)
- Josiah Grout, former State Senator from Newport and Speaker of the Vermont House of Representatives (Republican)
- J. Henry Jackson (Democratic)
- Rodney Whittemore (Prohibition)

=== Results ===
1896 Vermont gubernatorial election
Party	Candidate	Votes	%	±%
Republican	Josiah Grout	53,426	76.41	
Democratic	J. Henry Jackson	14,855	21.24	
Populist	Joseph Battell	831	1.19	
Prohibition	Rodney Whittemore	755	1.08	
N/A	Other	55	0.08	
Total votes		69,922	100.0	
