= 26th New York Cavalry Regiment =

- Active: February 24, 1865 –July 7, 1865
- Country: United States of America
- Allegiance: Union
- Branch: Union Army
- Type: Cavalry
- Nickname: Frontier Cavalry
- Engagements: American Civil War

Commanders
- Notable commanders: Col. Burr Porter

The 26th New York Cavalry Regiment was a volunteer cavalry regiment in the Union Army during the American Civil War. It was organized under special authority of the War Department, to serve on the northern frontier of New England and New York for one year. It was created in response to the St. Albans raid, which occurred on October 19, 1864. The regiment never saw any combat before it was mustered out on July 7, 1865.

== History ==
The 26th New York Cavalry was organized by the War Department specifically to defend the northern border area from attacks similar to St. Albans Raid. It was to serve 1 year and it contained men from New York, Massachusetts, and Vermont.

From October 1864 until January 1865, the northern frontier was guarded by a provisional force consisting, at least in Vermont, of recently returned veterans, militia, cadets from Norwich University, and other volunteers. These groups were replaced by the regiment and members of the Veteran Reserve Corps.

The regiment of cavalry consisted of seven companies from New York, three from Massachusetts, and two from Vermont, Companies F and M. The Vermont companies were stationed at Burlington and then St. Albans, and the others along the Canada–US border in New York.

=== Vermont's Involvement ===
The Field and Staff Officers of the regiment included two Vermonters, Major Josiah Grout of Barton, late of the 1st Vermont Cavalry, and Regimental Commissary Elisha May, of Concord, late of the 2nd Vermont Infantry.

The first Vermont company, Company M, was recruited in Rutland, on January 4, 1865, and left for Burlington the next day. The subsequently moved to St. Albans on February 24, and returned to Burlington on June 27 for discharge.

The second Vermont company, Company F, was recruited in Burlington on January 3. They also moved to St. Albans on February 24, and returned for discharge on June 27, 1865.

Both companies were organized in Burlington by Vermont Adjutant General Peter T. Washburn in early January 1865, and were quartered in the barracks at the old fair grounds until midwinter, while they waited for new barracks to be completed there. The two companies remained in St. Albans until the end of June, when they were mustered out due to the end of the war.

The companies, 206 strong, never engaged the enemy, and only lost two men, an officer who resigned in March, and an enlisted man who deserted.

== Casualties ==
The regiment lost 3 men to disease.

== See also ==
- List of New York Civil War units
- Vermont in the Civil War
- Roster of the 26th New York Cavalry
