= Zophar Mansur =

American politician

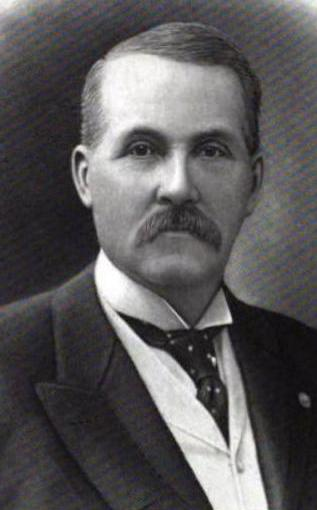
- Mansur as depicted in 1903's Genealogical and Family History of the State of Vermont

U.S. Collector of Customs for the District of Memphremagog
- In office June 4, 1897 – January 1, 1906
- Preceded by: None (position created)
- Succeeded by: Curtis S. Emery

40th Lieutenant Governor of Vermont
- In office October 4, 1894 – October 8, 1896
- Governor: Urban A. Woodbury
- Preceded by: F. Stewart Stranahan
- Succeeded by: Nelson W. Fisk

Member of the Vermont Senate from Essex County
- In office 1888–1890
- Preceded by: Franklin D. Hale
- Succeeded by: Selim E. Grout

Member of the Vermont House of Representatives from Brighton
- In office 1886–1888
- Preceded by: Newton E. Bonney
- Succeeded by: George S. Robinson

State's Attorney of Essex County, Vermont
- In office 1886–1888
- Preceded by: Franklin D. Hale
- Succeeded by: Franklin D. Hale

Personal details
- Born: Zophar Mack Mansur; November 23, 1843 Morgan, Vermont, US
- Died: March 28, 1914 (aged 70) Burlington, Vermont, US
- Resting place: East Main Street Cemetery, Newport, Vermont
- Party: Republican
- Spouse: Ellen L. Newhill (m. 1867)
- Profession: Attorney; Businessman; Banker

Zophar Mack Mansur (November 23, 1843 – March 28, 1914) was an American Civil War veteran, lawyer, banker, and politician who served as the 40th lieutenant governor of Vermont.

== Early life ==
Mansur was born in Morgan, Vermont, on November 23, 1843, the son of Warren and Jane A. (Morse) Mansur. He was educated at the Washington County Grammar School in Montpelier and graduated from the Derby Academy.

== Civil War ==
He enlisted on August 11, 1862, and mustered in as a corporal in Company K, 10th Vermont Infantry on September 1, 1862. He participated with his regiment in the Battle of the Wilderness, Spotsylvania, North Anna, Cold Harbor, Petersburg, Monocacy Junction and 3rd Winchester. He was wounded at Winchester on September 19, 1864, and lost his right arm. He was subsequently medically discharged on August 31, 1865.

== Postwar life ==
In 1867 he married Ellen L. Newhill. They were the parents of two children, Warren and Jane.

He served as postmaster in Island Pond, Vermont, from February 1867 to November 1885. He studied law with George N. Dale from 1870 to 1875 and was admitted to the bar in 1875. He practiced law until 1892, and became active in several businesses; in 1892 his lumber business became the main focus of his activities, and he practiced law less actively. He was also a director of the National Bank of Derby Line from 1885 to 1905 when he became the bank's president.

A Republican, he was state's attorney of Essex County from 1886 to 1888. He represented Brighton in the Vermont House of Representatives from 1886 to 1888, serving on the judiciary committee and the committee on military affairs. From 1888 to 1890 he represented Essex County as a member of the Vermont State Senate. He served as Lieutenant Governor from 1894 to 1896. He was appointed Collector of Customs for the Memphremagog District by President Benjamin Harrison in 1897 and served until 1906.

He was a trustee of the Vermont Soldiers' Home in Bennington from its creation in 1884 and a trustee of the University of Vermont. Fraternal organizations he was active in included the Sons of the American Revolution, Vermont Officers' Reunion Society, Grand Army of the Republic, and the Masons.

== Death and burial ==
Mansur died in Burlington, Vermont on March 28, 1914, aged 70. He was buried at East Main Street Cemetery in Newport, Vermont.

== See also ==
- Vermont in the Civil War

== Sources ==
- Benedict, G. G., Vermont in the Civil War. A History of the part taken by the Vermont Soldiers And Sailors in the War For The Union, 1861-5, Burlington, VT: The Free Press Association, 1888, pp. ii:322.
- Fleetwood, Frederick G., Vermont Legislative Directory, Biennial Session, 1902, sited at www.ancestry.com.
- Dodge, Prentiss C., compiler. "Encyclopedia Vermont Biography," Burlington, VT: Ullery Publishing Company, 1912, pp. 257–258.
- Peck, Theodore S., compiler, Revised Roster of Vermont Volunteers and lists of Vermonters Who Served in the Army and Navy of the United States During the War of the Rebellion, 1861-66. Montpelier, VT.: Press of the Watchman Publishing Co., 1892, p. 406.

Party political offices
Preceded by Farrand Stewart Stranahan	Republican nominee for Lieutenant Governor of Vermont; 1894	Succeeded by Nelson W. Fisk
Political offices
Preceded by F. Stewart Stranahan	Lieutenant Governor of Vermont; 1894–1896	Succeeded by Nelson W. Fisk
