= Henry C. Bates =

United States federal judge and politician

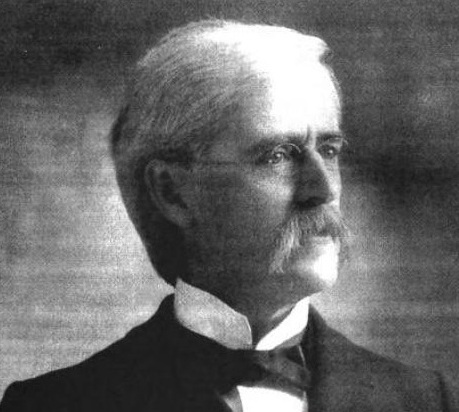
- Henry Clay Bates (1843–1909)

Judge for the 9th District of the Court of First Instance, Manila
- In office 1901–1907
- Preceded by: New position
- Succeeded by: James Ross

42nd Lieutenant Governor of Vermont
- In office 1898–1900
- Governor: Edward C. Smith
- Preceded by: Nelson W. Fisk
- Succeeded by: Martin F. Allen

Member of the Vermont House of Representatives
- In office 1896–1897
- Preceded by: John C. Clark
- Succeeded by: Truman R. Stiles

President pro tempore of the Vermont State Senate
- In office 1886–1890
- Preceded by: Laforrest H. Thompson
- Succeeded by: Frank A. Dwinell

Member of the Vermont State Senate
- In office 1886–1890
- Preceded by: Henry Clay Ide
- Succeeded by: Albro F. Nichols

Personal details
- Born: January 29, 1843 Derby Line, Vermont
- Died: March 12, 1909 (aged 66) Berkeley, California
- Resting place: Smithland Cemetery, Smithland, Iowa
- Occupation: Attorney

Military service
- Allegiance: United States (Union)
- Branch/service: Union Army
- Years of service: 1864-1865
- Rank: Private
- Unit: Company C, 4th Massachusetts Heavy Artillery
- Battles/wars: American Civil War

Henry Clay Bates (January 29, 1843 – March 12, 1909), frequently known as H. C. Bates, was a Vermont lawyer and politician who served as the 42nd lieutenant governor of Vermont and as a judge of the Insular Government of the Philippine Islands.

== Early life ==
Henry Clay Bates was born in Derby Line, Vermont on January 29, 1843. He was educated at Derby Academy, taught school in Vermont and Maine, and studied law in Derby and Charleston before enlisting for the Civil War.

== Military service ==
Bates served as a member of Company C, 4th Massachusetts Heavy Artillery. After the war he was an active member of the Grand Army of the Republic.

== Early career ==
Bates resumed his legal studies after leaving the Army, attained admission to the bar in 1866 and practiced law in St. Johnsbury. A Republican, he served in numerous local offices, including Superintendent of Schools of Guildhall and Town Meeting Moderator of St. Johnsbury.

Bates also served as Caledonia County State's Attorney from 1880 to 1882 and 1892 to 1894. From 1886 to 1890 Bates was a member of the Vermont Senate and served as Senate President.

Bates served in the Vermont House of Representatives from 1896 to 1897. In 1898 he won election as Lieutenant Governor and served until 1900.

He participated in numerous county and state Republican conventions, and was a Delegate to the 1900 Republican National Convention.

== Territorial judge ==
In 1901 Bates was appointed a judge for the 9th district of the Court of First Instance, Manila, a position within the Insular Government of the Philippine Islands. He served until his 1907 resignation, afterwards living in retirement in Berkeley, California.

== Death and burial ==
Bates died in Berkeley on March 12, 1909, after having been ill as the result of his service in the Philippines. He was buried at Smithland Cemetery (Little Sioux Township Cemetery) in Smithland, Iowa, where his wife's family resided.

== Family ==
In 1866, Bates married Laura E. Jenness of Morgan, Vermont. They were the parents of one son who lived to adulthood, attorney Jerry Dickerman Bates (1869-1952), who was usually referred to as J. Dickerman Bates.

Party political offices
Preceded by Nelson W. Fisk	Republican nominee for Lieutenant Governor of Vermont; 1898	Succeeded by Martin F. Allen
Political offices
Preceded by Nelson W. Fisk	Lieutenant Governor of Vermont; 1898–1900	Succeeded by Martin F. Allen
