= Nelson W. Fisk =

American businessman and politician from Vermont

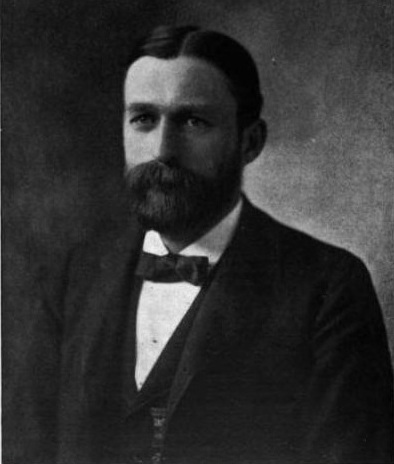
- From the February 1901 edition of The Vermonter magazine

Lieutenant Governor of Vermont
- In office 1896–1898
- Governor: Josiah Grout
- Preceded by: Zophar M. Mansur
- Succeeded by: Henry C. Bates

Member of the Vermont Senate from Grand Isle County
- In office 1888–1890
- Preceded by: Jerome P. Hall
- Succeeded by: Hardy L. Reynolds

Member of the Vermont House of Representatives from Isle La Motte
- In office 1882–1888
- Preceded by: James Hurst
- Succeeded by: Edgar S. Fleury

Personal details
- Born: August 5, 1854 Isle La Motte, Vermont, U.S.
- Died: October 1, 1923 (aged 69) Isle La Motte, Vermont, U.S.
- Resting place: South Cemetery, Isla La Motte, Vermont
- Spouse: Elizabeth B. Hubbell (m. 1880)
- Education: Eastman Business College
- Occupation: Businessman

Nelson Wilbur Fisk (August 5, 1854 – October 1, 1923) was a Vermont businessman and political figure who served as the 41st lieutenant governor of Vermont from 1896 to 1898.

== Biography ==
Nelson Wilbur Fisk was born in Isle La Motte, Vermont on August 5, 1854. He graduated from Eastman Business College in Poughkeepsie, New York and was employed at his family's marble quarry, becoming sole proprietor after his father Hiram's death in 1884. Fisk married Elizabeth B. Hubbell of Chazy, New York in 1880. Mrs. Fisk became an expert in textile weaving and dyeing, and her wall hangings, placemats and tablecloths are prized by collectors.

A Republican, Fisk was a member of the Vermont House of Representatives from 1882 to 1888 and the Vermont Senate from 1888 to 1890. As a legislator he played a key role in the construction of three Grand Isle bridges, including the first one to connect it with the Vermont mainland at Alburg. He served as a Trustee of the State Normal School (now Johnson State College), the State Industrial School in Vergennes (then Vermont's reform institution for juveniles) and the University of Vermont. He was also a Delegate to the 1888 and 1892 Republican national conventions. In 1896 he was elected Lieutenant Governor and served one term, 1896 to 1898.

In 1901, Vice President Theodore Roosevelt was visiting with Fisk and other Vermont Republicans at Fisk's home when Roosevelt was informed that President William McKinley had been shot. (McKinley died eight days later and Roosevelt became president.)

Fisk died in Isle La Motte on October 1, 1923, and was buried in Isle La Motte's South Cemetery. The Fisk quarry on Isle La Motte's West Shore Road has been turned into an environmental interpretive site that is open to the public.

Party political offices
Preceded by Zophar Mansur	Republican nominee for Lieutenant Governor of Vermont; 1896	Succeeded by Henry C. Bates
Political offices
Preceded by Zophar M. Mansur	Lieutenant Governor of Vermont; 1896–1898	Succeeded by Henry C. Bates
