= Edmund Elisha Case =

American painter

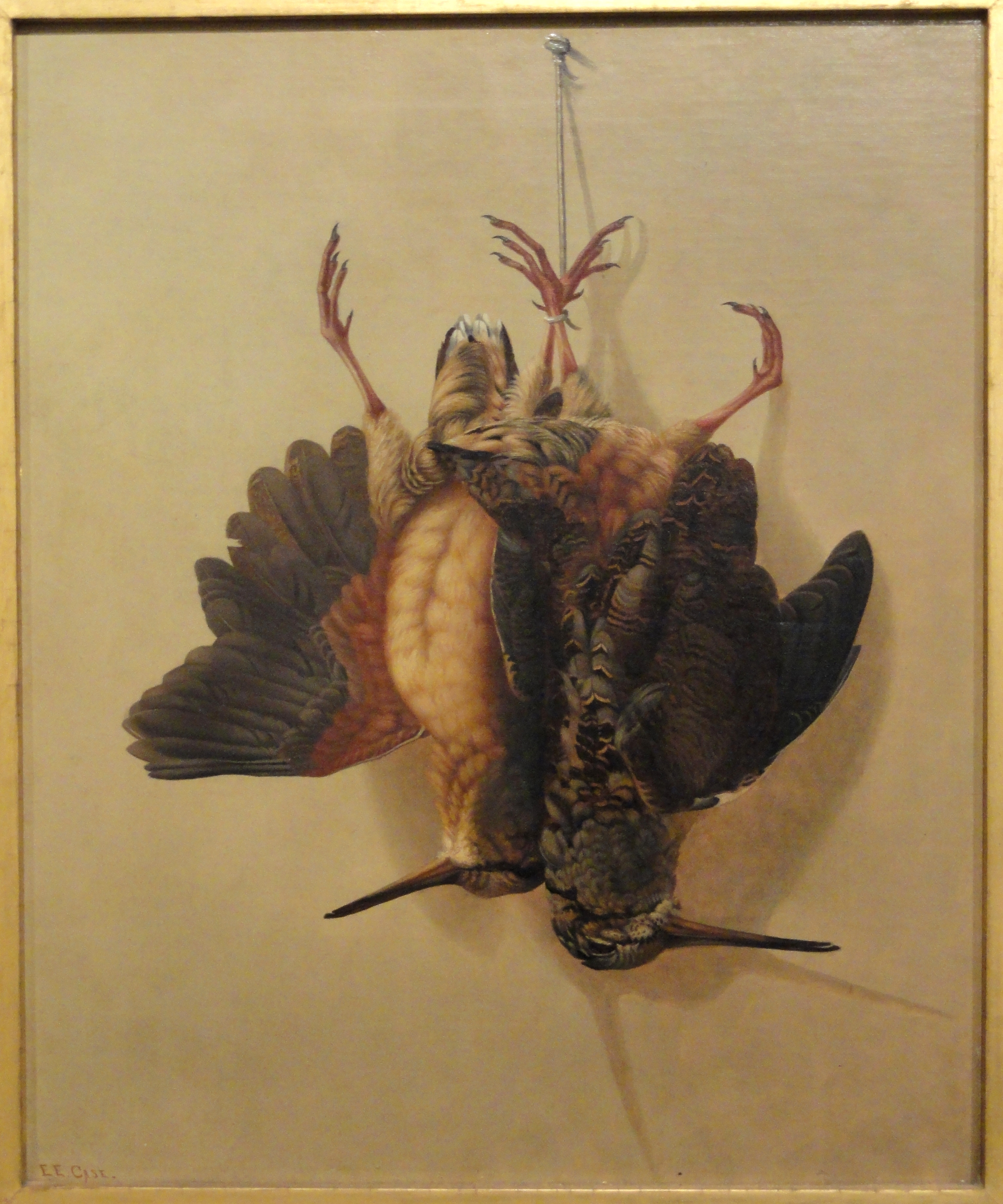
Woodcock by Edmund Elisha Case (undated)

Edmund Elisha Case (April 1844 – November 1919) was an American painter active in Springfield, Massachusetts.

== Background ==
Case was born in Suffield, Connecticut, but after his parents' deaths, he moved to Springfield, Massachusetts where he was educated in public schools and then at the Suffield Institute. He subsequently attended Eastman Business College in Poughkeepsie, New York, and served with the Navy in the Civil War, spending several months in Libby Prison.

From 1873 to 1875, he studied at the National Academy of Design, augmented by private studies with Joseph Oriel Eaton and visits to the Netherlands, Italy, France, and England, with classes at the Académie Julian in Paris with Tony Robert-Fleury and William-Adolphe Bouguereau.

In 1875, Case returned to Springfield, where he remained for the rest of his life, painting local landscapes and still-lifes.

On November 3rd, 1919, Case died at Buscall's sanitarium in Springfield. He was described by the Springfield Republican as, "a well-known artist not only in this city but in Western Massachusetts."
