= 1916 United States Senate election in Vermont =

- November 7, 1916
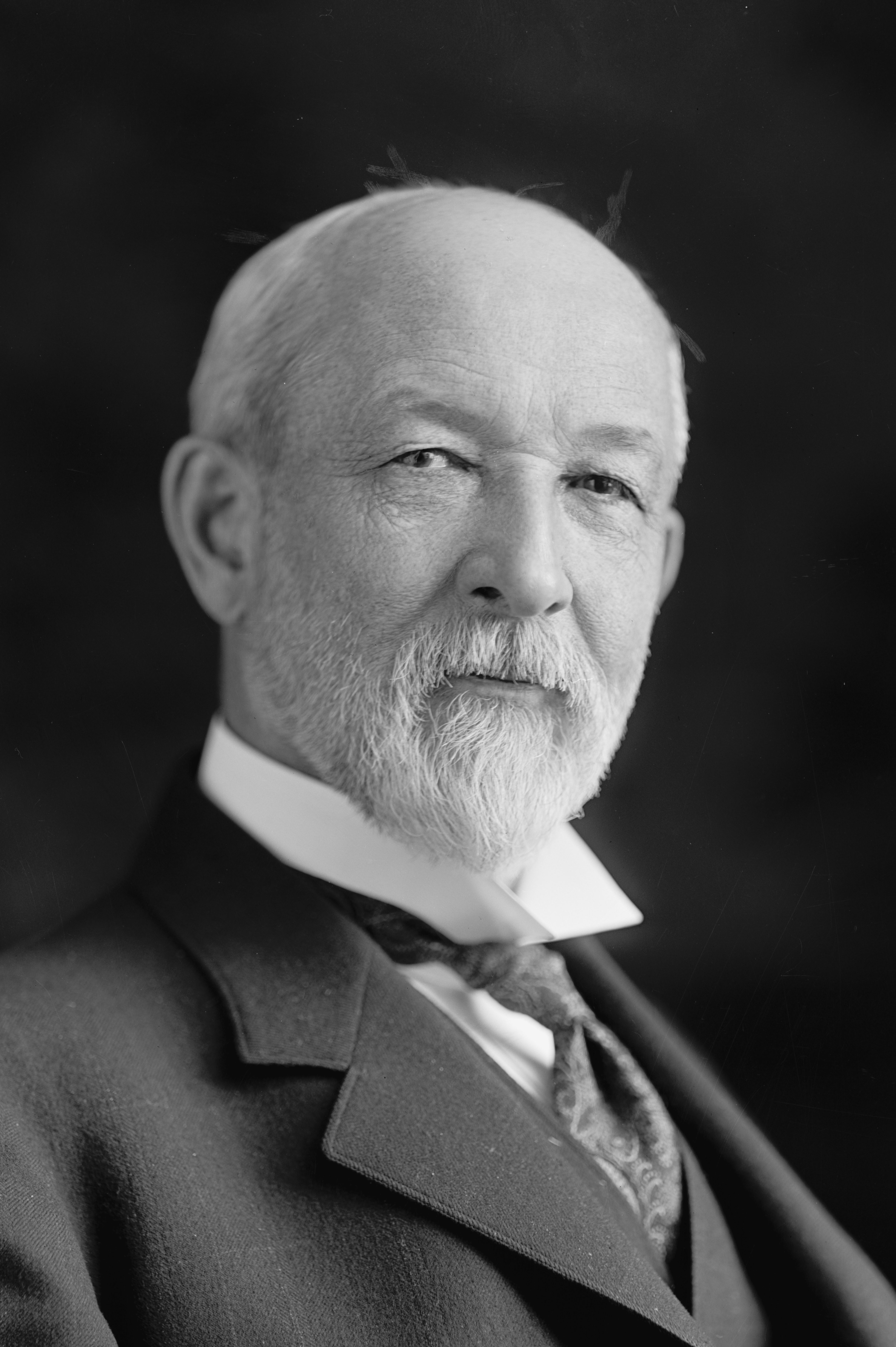

Nominee	Carroll S. Page	Oscar C. Miller
Party	Republican	Democratic
Popular vote	47,362	14,956
Percentage	74.41%	23.50%
- Page: 40–50% 50–60% 60–70% 70–80% 80–90% >90% Miller: 50–60%
U.S. senator before election
Carroll S. Page
Republican
Elected U.S. Senator
Carroll S. Page
Republican

The 1916 United States Senate election in Vermont took place on November 7, 1916. Incumbent Republican Carroll S. Page successfully ran for re-election to another term in the United States Senate, defeating Democratic candidate Oscar C. Miller. This was the second United States Senate direct election to take place in Vermont following the ratification of the Seventeenth Amendment to the United States Constitution and the first for Vermont's Class I seat.

== Republican primary ==
=== Results ===
Republican primary results
Party	Candidate	Votes	%	±%
Republican	Carroll S. Page (inc.)	27,213	62.0	
Republican	Allen M. Fletcher	8,912	20.3	
Republican	Charles W. Gates	7,753	17.7	
Republican	Other	7	0.0	
Total votes		43,885	100.0	

== Democratic primary ==
=== Results ===
Democratic primary results
Party	Candidate	Votes	%	±%
Democratic	Oscar C. Miller	3,816	99.8	
Democratic	Other	6	0.2	
Total votes		3,822	100.0	

== General election ==
=== Results ===
United States Senate election in Vermont, 1916
Party	Candidate	Votes	%	±%
Republican	Carroll S. Page (inc.)	47,362	74.41%	
Democratic	Oscar C. Miller	14,956	23.50%	
Socialist	Norman E. Greenslet	1,336	2.10%	
Total votes		63,654	100.00%	
