= Reuben L. Snowe =

American educator and politician

Reuben Lorenzo Snowe (September 28, 1866 – September 30, 1942) was an American educator and politician.

== Biography ==
Born in Danforth, Maine, Snowe went to Lee Academy, Freyeburg Academy and Eastman Business College. Snowe taught school and was involved with The National Grange of the Order of Patrons of Husbandry. Snowe served as first selectman. In 1903 and 1904, Snowe served in the Maine House of Representatives, from West Gardiner, Maine, and was a Republican. Snowe died in a hospital in Gardiner, Maine.
