= 1890 Vermont gubernatorial election =

- September 2, 1890
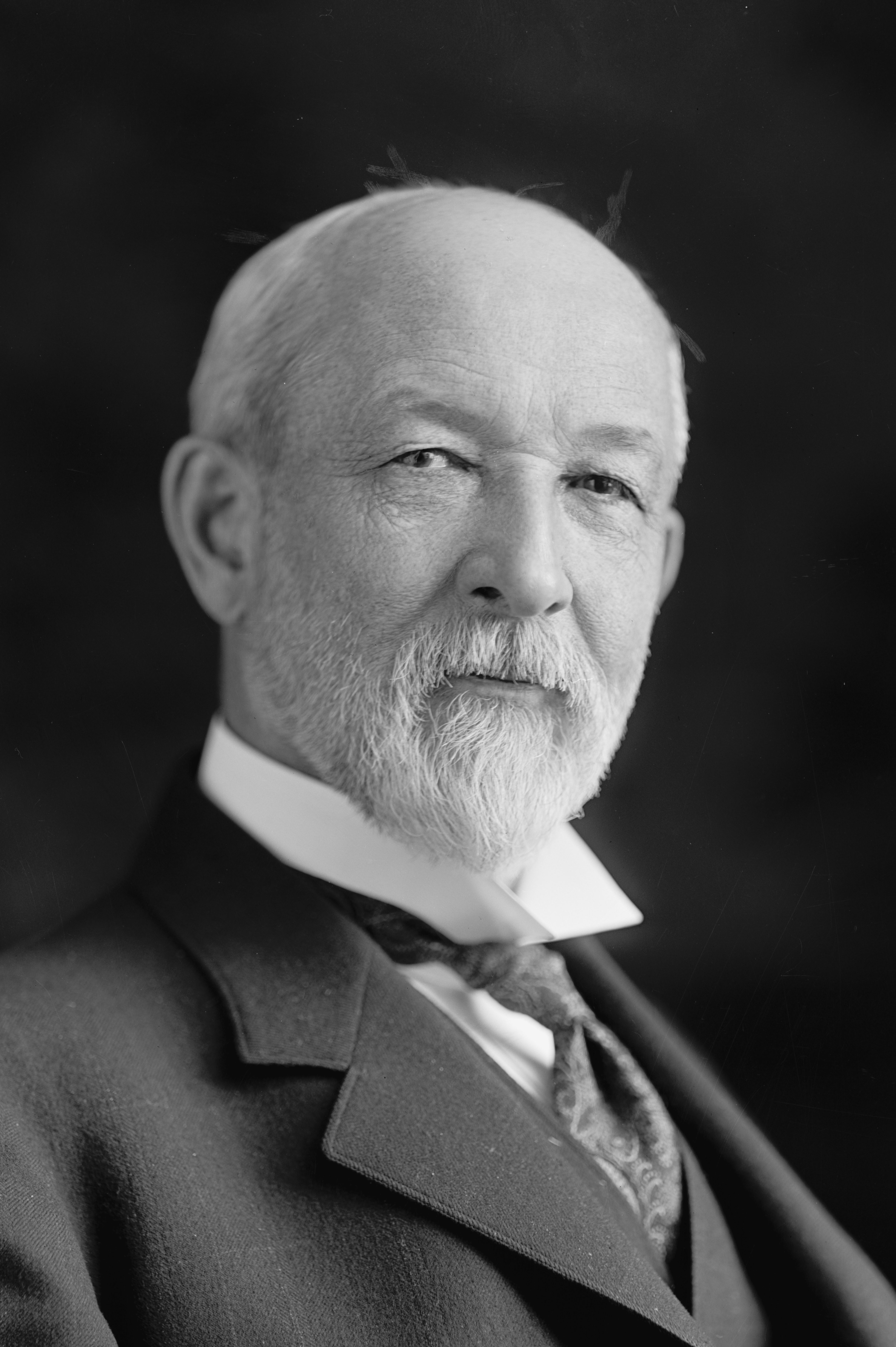

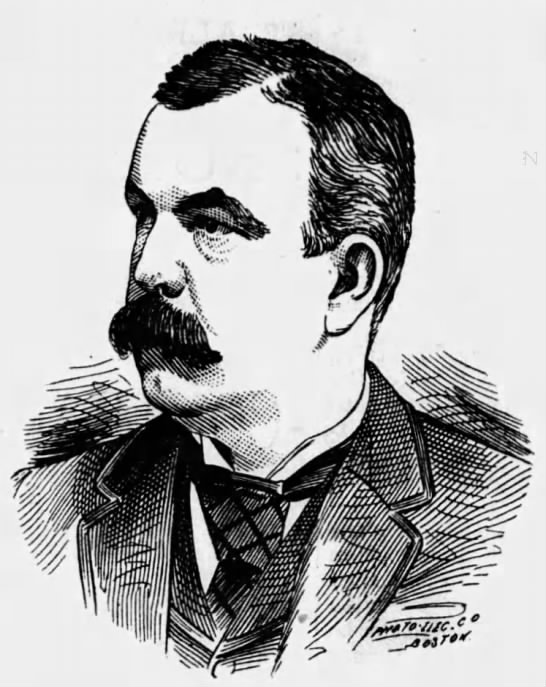
Nominee	Carroll S. Page	Herbert F. Brigham
Party	Republican	Democratic
Popular vote	33,462	19,299
Percentage	61.71%	35.59%
- County results Page: 50–60% 60–70% 70–80%
Governor before election
William P. Dillingham
Republican
Elected Governor
Carroll S. Page
Republican

The 1890 Vermont gubernatorial election took place on September 2, 1890. Incumbent Republican William P. Dillingham, per the "Mountain Rule", did not run for re-election to a second term as Governor of Vermont. Republican candidate Carroll S. Page defeated Democratic candidate Herbert F. Brigham to succeed him.

== Results ==
1890 Vermont gubernatorial election
Party	Candidate	Votes	%	±%
Republican	Carroll S. Page	33,462	61.71	−8.2
Democratic	Herbert F. Brigham	19,299	35.59	+7.5
Prohibition	Edward L. Allen	1,161	2.14	+0.1
N/A	Other	304	0.56	+0.6
Total votes		54,226	100.0	–
