= Martin F. Allen =

American businessman and politician (1842–1927)

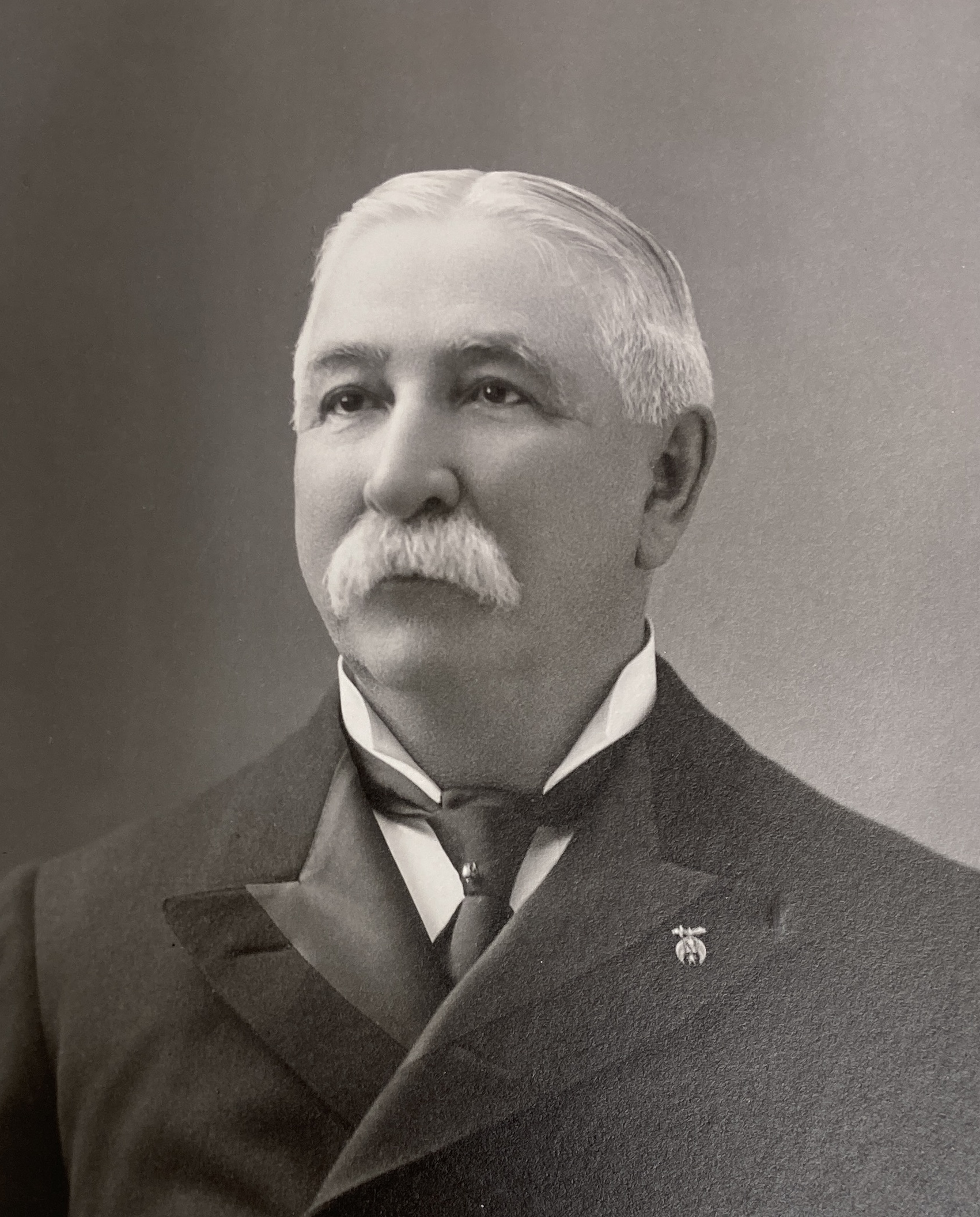
- Allen in 1900

Lieutenant Governor of Vermont
- In office 1900–1902
- Governor: William W. Stickney
- Preceded by: Henry C. Bates
- Succeeded by: Zed S. Stanton

Member of the Vermont Senate from Addison County
- In office 1890–1892 Serving with George E. Child
- Preceded by: George Hammond, Willis R. Peake
- Succeeded by: Howard Clark, Charles E. Abell

Member of the Vermont House of Representatives from Ferrisburgh
- In office 1882–1884
- Preceded by: Jared Booth
- Succeeded by: Reuben Parker

Personal details
- Born: November 28, 1842 North Ferrisburgh, Vermont, U.S.
- Died: May 24, 1927 (aged 84) North Ferrisburgh, Vermont, U.S.
- Resting place: North Ferrisburgh Cemetery
- Party: Republican
- Spouse: Eliza F. Daniels (m. 1867)
- Children: 1
- Education: Eastman Business College
- Occupation: Businessman

Martin Fletcher Allen (November 28, 1842 – May 24, 1927) was a Vermont banker, businessman, farmer and politician who served one term as the 43rd lieutenant governor of Vermont.

== Early life ==
Martin Fletcher Allen was born in North Ferrisburgh, Vermont on November 28, 1842. He attended Eastman Business College in Poughkeepsie, New York and became a merchant and store owner. Allen was also involved in several other businesses, including banking, farms and a grist mill, in addition serving as North Ferrisburg's Postmaster.

== Political involvement ==
A Republican, Allen served in the Vermont House of Representatives from 1882 to 1884 and the Vermont Senate from 1890 to 1892. He was elected Vermont's Lieutenant Governor in 1900 and served until 1902.

== Criminal trial ==
In May 1901 Allen was one of several officers of the Farmers' National Bank who were arrested and accused of being complicit in embezzlement by the bank's Cashier. The officers of the bank were tried in 1902 and found not guilty, while the Cashier was convicted and sentenced to seven years in prison.

== Retirement and death ==
After leaving office Allen resumed his business pursuits, remaining active until complications of Alzheimer's disease caused him to withdraw from active pursuits, after which he lived in retirement in North Ferrisburgh. Allen died in North Ferrisburgh on May 24, 1927. He was buried in North Ferrisburgh Cemetery.

Party political offices
Preceded by Henry C. Bates	Republican nominee for Lieutenant Governor of Vermont; 1900	Succeeded by Zed S. Stanton
Political offices
Preceded by Henry C. Bates	Lieutenant Governor of Vermont; 1900–1902	Succeeded by Zed S. Stanton
