= Farrand Stewart Stranahan =

American politician (1842–1904)

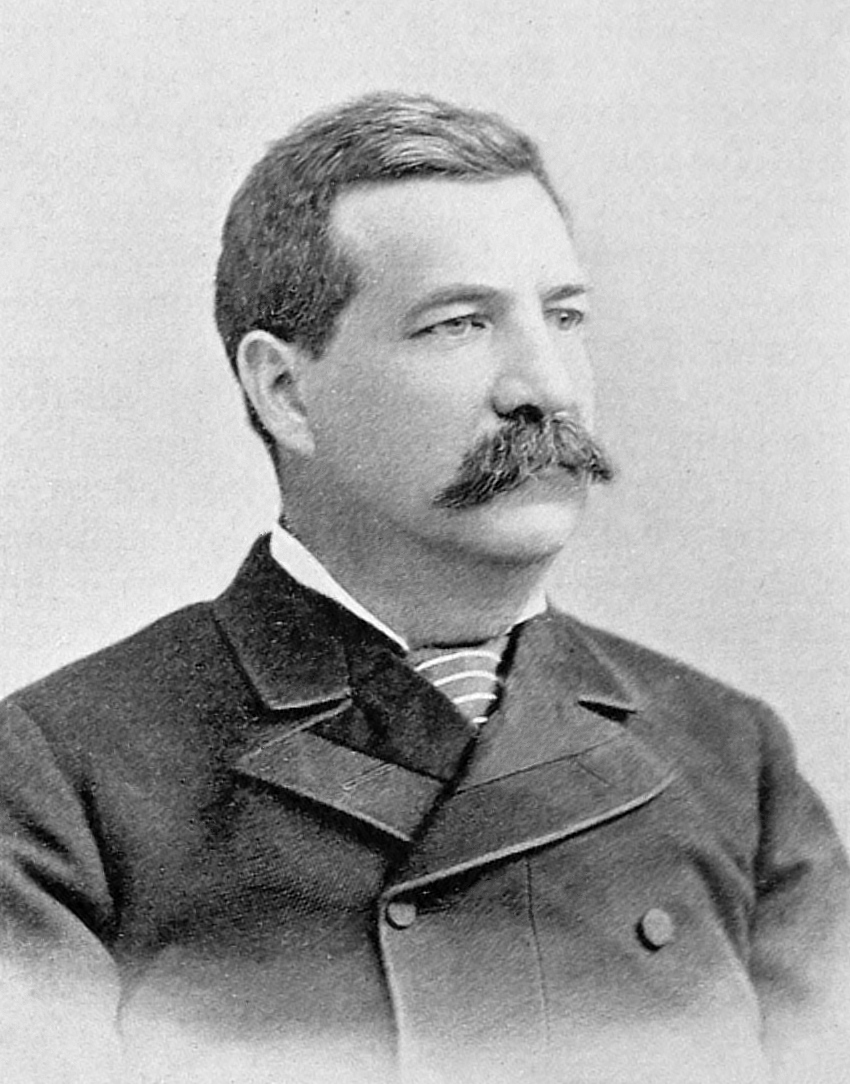

39th Lieutenant Governor of Vermont
- In office October 6, 1892 – October 4, 1894
- Governor: Levi K. Fuller
- Preceded by: Henry A. Fletcher
- Succeeded by: Zophar M. Mansur

Member of the Vermont State Senate
- In office 1888–1889

Member of the Vermont House of Representatives
- In office 1884–1885

Personal details
- Born: February 2, 1842 Manhattan, New York City, US
- Died: July 13, 1904 (aged 62) St. Albans, Vermont
- Resting place: Greenwood Cemetery, St. Albans, Vermont
- Party: Republican
- Spouse: Miranda Aldis Brainerd (m. 1862)
- Relatives: Farrand Stranahan (grandfather); Charles Stewart (great-grandfather)
- Profession: Railroad executive Banker
- Military career
- Branch: Union Army
- Service years: 1862–1864
- Rank: First Sergeant
- Commands: 1st Vermont Cavalry
- Conflicts: American Civil War; Battle of Gettysburg

Farrand Stewart Stranahan (February 2, 1842 – July 13, 1904) was an American Civil War veteran, a railroad executive, a banker, and a U.S. politician of the Republican Party.

== Early life ==
Stranahan was born in Manhattan, New York City, the son of Caroline (née Curtis) and Farrand Stewart Stranahan (1812–1845). New York State Senator Farrand Stranahan (1778–1826) was his grandfather, and General Charles Stewart was his great-grandfather.

In 1859 Stranahan moved to Vermont. On August 6, 1862, he married Miranda Aldis Brainerd, daughter of Senator Lawrence Brainerd and Fidelia Gadcomb. The marriage tied him to two of Vermont's most prominent families, the Brainerds and the Smiths. Miranda's sister Ann was the wife of Governor and Central Vermont Railway President J. Gregory Smith. In addition, her brother Lawrence Brainerd Jr. was married to Louisa T. B. Smith, J. Gregory Smith's sister.

J. Gregory Smith's father, John Smith, served as Speaker of the Vermont House of Representatives and a Member of the United States House of Representatives in addition to being an early organizer of the Central Vermont Railway. J. Gregory Smith was the brother of Congressman Worthington Curtis Smith and father of Governor Edward Curtis Smith.

== Civil War ==
Stranahan enlisted on August 15, 1862, and mustered in as First Sergeant of Company L, 1st Vermont Cavalry Regiment on September 29, 1862. He was commissioned a second lieutenant on January 18, 1864, to rank from January 5, and First Lieutenant on May 5, 1864, to rank from February 28. For several months he was aide-de-camp to Brigadier General George A. Custer.

While still a First Sergeant Stranahan participated in Elon J. Farnsworth's charge at Gettysburg. He is depicted on the bronze bas-relief of the charge on the William Wells Monument between Big Round Top and Bushman's Hill.

Stranahan resigned from the service on August 28, 1864. On the afternoon of October 19, 1864, the northernmost land event of the Civil War occurred, the St. Albans Raid. Stranahan participated in the pursuit of the fleeing Confederates after they had robbed several banks and wounded two citizens, one mortally. The J. Gregory Smith home was a target of the raid, but the raiders bypassed the house while fleeing. For her actions in defending the Smith home and efforts to rally the people of St. Albans in pursuing the raiders, Peter T. Washburn named Mrs. Smith a brevet Lieutenant Colonel on his staff.

== Postwar life ==
Stranahan became paymaster of the Vermont Central Railway in 1865. In 1871 he was appointed treasurer of the National Car Company, another Smith family railroad enterprise. In 1886, he became cashier of the Welden National Bank and was appointed its vice president in 1892. He was also a director of the Central Vermont Railway, vice president of the Missisquoi Railroad, an officer of the National Dispatch Line (part of the Grand Trunk Line), and vice president of the St. Albans Messenger.

He continued his military affiliation as commander of Company D, 1st Vermont Infantry Regiment with the rank of captain, and was chief of staff for Governor Ebenezer J. Ormsbee with the rank of colonel.

Stranahan's fraternal associations include the Grand Army of the Republic and the Military Order of the Loyal Legion of the United States. He was a Republican and served as a trustee of the village of St. Albans and member of the Vermont House of Representatives. He later served in the Vermont State Senate and was a trustee of the state reform school.

In 1892 he was elected lieutenant governor, and served the one term then available under the "Mountain Rule".

== Death and burial ==
In 1904, Stranahan became ill and traveled to The Bahamas in an effort to regain his health. He died in St. Albans on July 13, 1904, aged 62, and is buried in Greenwood Cemetery.

== See also ==
- Vermont in the Civil War

== Additional sources ==
- Carleton, Hiram, Genealogical and Family History of the State of Vermont, New York: The Lewis Publishing Company, 1903, i:306-307.
- Custer, Andie, "The Wells Monument: Bas Relief of Farnsworth's Charge," Blue & Gray, Spring 2006, 23:i, p. 56.
- Hoffman, Elliott W., editor, History of the First Vermont Cavalry Volunteers in the War of the Great Rebellion, Baltimore, MD: Butternut & Blue, 2000.
- Jackson, Horatio Nelson. Dedication of the statue to Brevet Major-General William Wells and the officers and men of the First Regiment Vermont Cavalry, on the battlefield of Gettysburg, July 3, 1913, privately printed, 1914, p. 45.
- Peck, Theodore S., compiler, Revised Roster of Vermont Volunteers and lists of Vermonters Who Served in the Army and Navy of the United States During the War of the Rebellion, 1861–66. Montpelier, VT.: Press of the Watchman Publishing Co., 1892, p. 260.

Party political offices
Preceded by Henry A. Fletcher	Republican nominee for Lieutenant Governor of Vermont; 1892	Succeeded by Zophar Mansur
Political offices
Preceded by Henry A. Fletcher	Lieutenant Governor of Vermont; 1892–1894	Succeeded by Zophar M. Mansur
