= Samuel Roger Smith =

Samuel Roger Smith also known as S. R. Smith (1853–1916) was a co-founder and the first president of Messiah College in Pennsylvania.

Samuel Roger Smith was born on a farm in Hummelstown, Pennsylvania near Hershey, Pennsylvania on September 16, 1853 to Michael and Mary Anna Shoop Smith. Smith became a teacher at a young age before eventually attending Eastman National Business College in Poughkeepsie, New York where he graduated first in his class and went on to earn a master's degree at Columbia College. In 1874, he married Elizabeth Light (1853-1919) after experiencing a conversion while courting her. He eventually became an active member of the Brethren in Christ Church eventually becoming General Conference secretary.

In 1879, he entered the milling industry with his brother-in-law John Light before moving into the drug sales industry. His wife Elizabeth Smith began cooking and selling popular noodles to neighbors, and eventually this became the main income source for the family of twelve.

Smith wanted his children to be educated in the Brethren in Christ tradition. No such schools existed at that time, so starting in 1907 Smith sought church backing and eventually became the founding president of Messiah Bible School and Missionary Training Home in 1909, which admitted students regardless of their race, sex, or creed and was intended to prepare students for lives of Christian service. Smith donated his house in Harrisburg to house Messiah's original students and the first twelve students attended tuition-free.

In 1911, due to overcrowding, Smith decided to move the campus to Grantham where there could be agricultural training and a more rural atmosphere, and Smith donated his land of five acres for the college, which included Old Main and several other original campus buildings. On September 12, 1916 Smith unexpectedly died.
