= Carroll S. Page =

American politician

Carroll Smalley Page
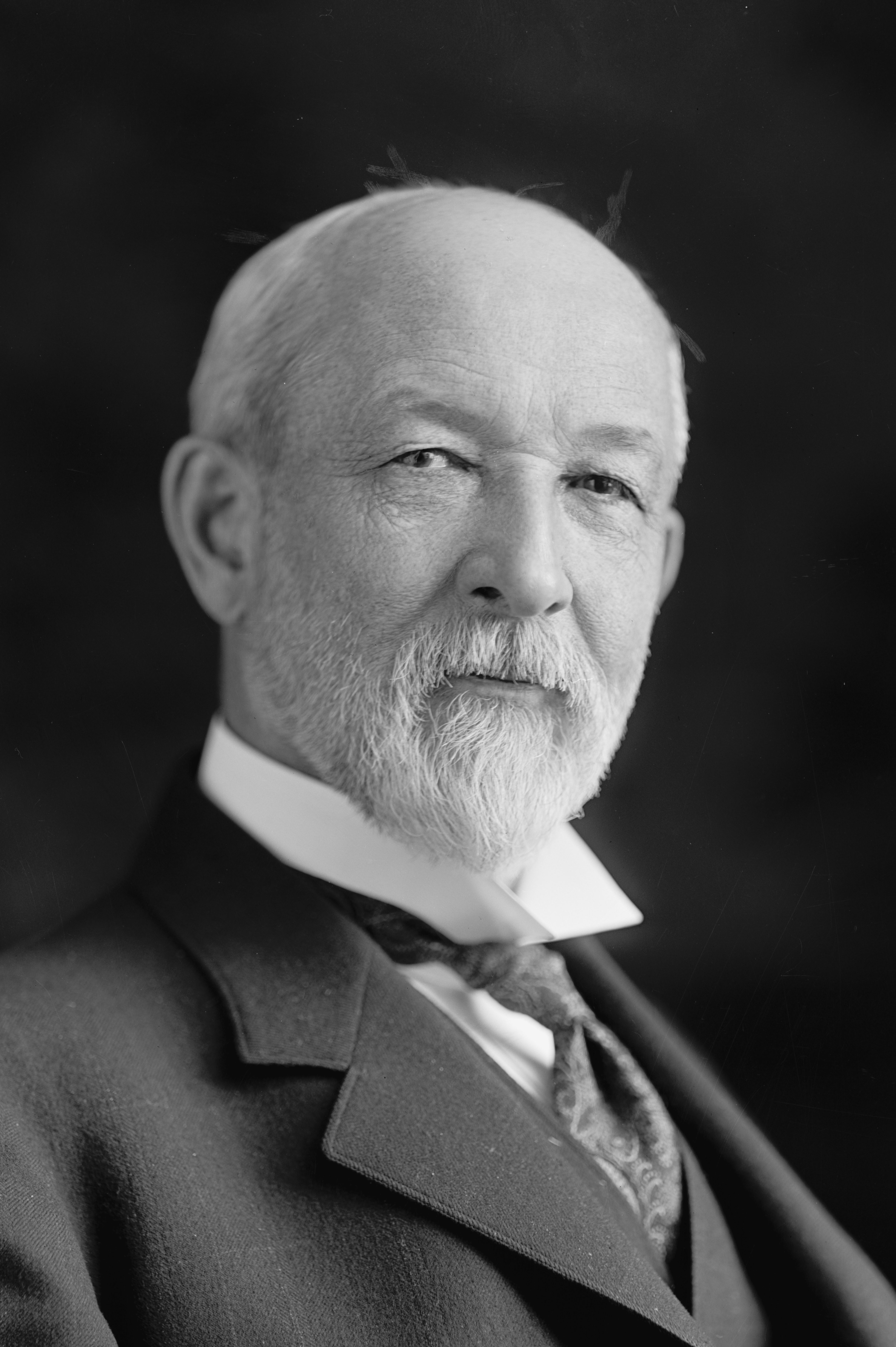

United States Senator from Vermont
- In office October 21, 1908 – March 3, 1923
- Preceded by: John W. Stewart
- Succeeded by: Frank L. Greene

43rd Governor of Vermont
- In office October 2, 1890 – October 6, 1892
- Lieutenant: Henry A. Fletcher
- Preceded by: William P. Dillingham
- Succeeded by: Levi K. Fuller

Register of Probate for Lamoille County, Vermont
- In office 1880–1891
- Preceded by: Henry C. Fisk
- Succeeded by: S. B. Waite

Member of the Vermont Senate
- In office 1874–1876
- Preceded by: H. Henry Powers
- Succeeded by: Edwin Wheelock
- Constituency: Lamoille County

Member of the Vermont House of Representatives
- In office 1869–1872
- Preceded by: Waldo Brigham
- Succeeded by: George L. Waterman
- Constituency: Hyde Park

Personal details
- Born: January 10, 1843 Westfield, Vermont, US
- Died: December 3, 1925 (aged 82) Hyde Park, Vermont, US
- Party: Republican
- Spouse: Ellen Frances Patch (m. 1865)
- Children: 3
- Profession: Businessman
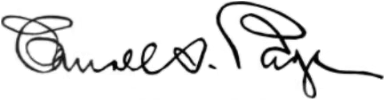
- Signature

Military service
- Allegiance: United States (Union); Vermont
- Branch/service: Vermont Militia
- Years of service: 1864-1865
- Rank: Major
- Unit: 4th Vermont Militia Regiment
- Battles/wars: American Civil War

Carroll Smalley Page (January 10, 1843 – December 3, 1925) was an American businessman and politician. He served as the 43rd governor of Vermont and a United States senator.

A native of Westfield, Vermont, Page was the son of a successful farmer, businessman, and local official. After completing his education he went into business as a buyer and seller of raw animal hides, which were used in leather production. Page used pioneering advertising and marketing techniques to grow his business, and was eventually recognized as the largest calfskin dealer in the world. During the American Civil War, Page served in the Vermont Militia's 4th Regiment.

A Republican, Page served in local and state offices including treasurer of Lamoille County (1866–1872), member of the Vermont House of Representatives (1869–1872) and member of the Vermont Senate (1874–1876). From 1880 to 1891 he served as Register of Probate for Lamoille County.

In September 1890, Page was elected governor, and he served one term, October 1890 to October 1892. In keeping with the Republican Party's "Mountain Rule," Page did not run for reelection to a second term and returned to his business interests. In 1908, the Vermont General Assembly elected Page to the United States Senate. He won reelection in 1910 and 1916, and served until 1923. Page was not a candidate for reelection in 1922.

After leaving the Senate, Page retired to Hyde Park. He died in Hyde Park on December 3, 1925. He was buried at Hyde Park Cemetery.

== Early life ==
Page was born in Westfield, Vermont, the son of Russel Smith Page (1813–1893) and Martha Malvina Smalley Page (1821–1907). Russel S. Page was a farmer, banker, businessman, and public official who served in several local offices, was a member of the Vermont House of Representatives, and held the county offices of sheriff, assistant judge, and probate judge. Carroll Page attended the local schools, People's Academy in Morrisville and Lamoille Central Academy in Hyde Park. He married Ellen Frances Patch on April 11, 1865, and they had three children.

== Career ==
Page went into the business of buying and selling raw animal hides for the production of leather goods. Based in Hyde Park, Page's enterprise grew until it was recognized as the largest calfskin dealer in the world.

During the American Civil War, Confederate forces carried out an attack in northern Vermont, the St. Albans Raid. As part of the state's response to the October 1864 attack, the militia expanded to carry out home guard duties. Page, who had previously registered for the draft, worked throughout November and December to raise a company for the Vermont Militia's 4th Regiment. He was elected to command the company with the rank of captain, and was later elected to serve as a major on the regimental staff.

He was Lamoille County Treasurer from 1866 to 1872. Page was also involved in the lumber business and served as President of the Lamoille County Savings Bank and Trust Company and the Lamoille County National Bank, both in Hyde Park. In addition, he was also a director of the St. Johnsbury and Lake Champlain Railroad.

From 1869 to 1872 Page was a member of the Vermont House of Representatives and from 1874 to 1876 he was a member of the Vermont Senate. He was register of the Lamoille County probate court from 1880 to 1891. He was a state savings bank examiner from 1884 to 1888.

As a Republican, Page was elected as Governor of Vermont and served from October 2, 1890, to October 6, 1892. During his term, the office of Governor of Vermont was empowered to appoint judges of all city and municipal courts, and legislation was enacted providing for secret ballots in elections.

In 1908, Page was elected as a Republican to the U.S. Senate to fill the vacancy caused by the death of Redfield Proctor, which John W. Stewart had held temporarily by appointment pending the election results. Page easily defeated the token Democratic candidate, Vernon A. Bullard; he was reelected in 1910 and 1916 and served from October 21, 1908, to March 3, 1923. He was not a candidate for reelection in 1922. While in the Senate, Page was chairman of the Committee on Standards, Weights and Measures (Sixty-first Congress) and a member of the Committee on Cuban Relations (Sixty-second Congress), the Committee on the Disposition of Useless Executive Papers (Sixty-third Congress), the Committee on Transportation and Sale of Meat Products (Sixty-fourth and Sixty-fifth Congresses), and the Committee on Naval Affairs (Sixty-sixth and Sixty-seventh Congresses).

== Death ==
Page resided in Hyde Park until his death on December 3, 1925. He is interred at Hyde Park Cemetery, Hyde Park, Lamoille County, Vermont.

== Family ==
Carroll Page was married to Ellen Frances Patch. They were the parents of three children: Theophilus Hull (1871–1898), Russel Smith (1877–1941), and Alice (1879–1929).

Party political offices
Preceded by William P. Dillingham	Republican nominee for Governor of Vermont; 1890	Succeeded by Levi K. Fuller
First	Republican nominee for U.S. Senator from Vermont (Class 1); 1916	Succeeded by Frank L. Greene
Political offices
Preceded by William P. Dillingham	Governor of Vermont; 1890–1892	Succeeded by Levi K. Fuller
U.S. Senate
Preceded by John W. Stewart	U.S. Senator (Class 1) from Vermont; 1908–1923	Succeeded by Frank L. Greene
