= Edward Curtis Smith =

Governor of Vermont (1854–1935)

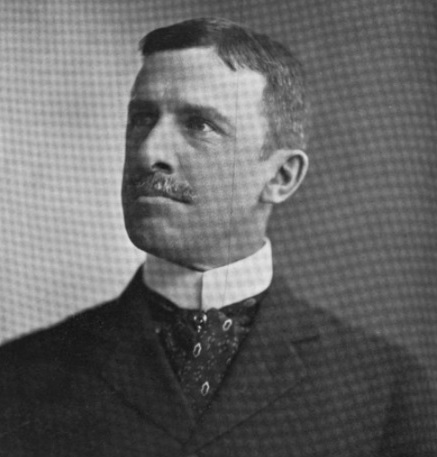
- The Vermonter magazine, July 1, 1898

47th Governor of Vermont
- In office October 6, 1898 – October 4, 1900
- Lieutenant: Henry C. Bates
- Preceded by: Josiah Grout
- Succeeded by: William W. Stickney

Member of the Vermont House of Representatives from St. Albans Town
- In office 1890–1892
- Preceded by: Henry M. Stevens
- Succeeded by: William H. Hunt

Personal details
- Born: January 5, 1854 St. Albans Town, Vermont
- Died: April 6, 1935 (aged 81) St. Albans City, Vermont
- Resting place: Greenwood Cemetery, St. Albans Town, Vermont
- Party: Republican
- Spouse: Anna Bailey James
- Education: Yale University AB, 1875; Columbia Law School LL.B., 1877
- Profession: Attorney; Businessman

Edward Curtis Smith (January 5, 1854 – April 6, 1935) was an American attorney, businessman, and politician from Vermont. A Republican, he was most notable for his service as the 47th governor of Vermont from 1898 to 1900.

== Early life ==
Edward Curtis Smith was born in St. Albans Town, Vermont, on January 5, 1854. The Smith family was one of Vermont's most prominent, with business holdings in railroads, manufacturing and other enterprises. Smith's father J. Gregory Smith served as Governor of Vermont, and his mother Ann Eliza (Brainerd) Smith was a noted author.

Smith's uncle Worthington Smith served in Congress. His grandfathers were also involved in politics, with John Smith serving in the United States House of Representatives and Lawrence Brainerd serving in the United States Senate. An uncle by marriage, Farrand Stewart Stranahan, served as Lieutenant governor of Vermont.

Smith attended the schools of St. Albans and Phillips Academy in Andover, Massachusetts. He graduated from Yale University in 1875, where he was a member of the Skull and Bones Society. Smith received his LL.B. degree from Columbia Law School in 1877, was admitted to the bar, and practiced in St. Albans.

== Business career ==
In addition to practicing law, Smith was active in several of the family's businesses. He succeeded his father as president of the Central Vermont Railroad. He was also president of Welden National Bank, and was a founder of People's Trust Bank of St. Albans and the Sherman National Bank in New York City. His other holdings included an ammunition manufacturing company and various mining ventures.

In 1876 Smith enlisted in Company D, 1st Vermont Militia Regiment (the Ransom Guards), in which he served for several years. He attained the rank of colonel while serving on the military staff of Governor Samuel E. Pingree from 1884 to 1886.

== Political career ==
A Republican, Smith was elected as a member of the Vermont House of Representatives in 1890. He served from 1890 to 1892, and held a leadership role as chairman of the Ways and Means Committee. In 1892 he declined the Republican nomination for Vermont State Senator from Franklin County. He was a delegate to the 1896 Republican National Convention.

== Election as governor ==
In 1898 Smith received the Republican nomination for governor. As the Republican nominee in a state that elected only Republicans to statewide office from the 1850s to the 1960s, Smith easily won the general election. He served the single two-year term available to governors under the "Mountain Rule".

As governor, Smith was a strong opponent of all efforts to regulate or tax corporations. In 1899 he officiated at the welcome ceremony in Montpelier for Admiral George Dewey, hero of the Spanish–American War and a native of Montpelier. Smith also organized Old Home Week, the fair and festival designed to celebrate rural life and Vermont roots of Americans living in other states.

== Later career ==
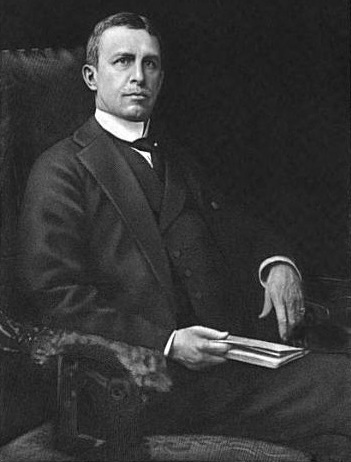
Smith in 1903, after serving as governor

After serving as governor, Smith returned to his railroad, manufacturing and banking interests. Smith was active in lineage societies such as the Society of Colonial Wars and the Sons of the American Revolution, and in the Vermont Historical Society. In 1901 he received the honorary degree of LL.D. from Norwich University.

Smith died in St. Albans City on April 6, 1935. He was buried at Greenwood Cemetery in St. Albans.

== Family ==
On October 3, 1888, Smith married Anna Bailey James, the granddaughter of Amaziah Bailey James. They were the parents of four children; James Gregory, Edward Fairchild, Curtis Ripley and Anna Dorothea Bradford.

Party political offices
Preceded by Josiah Grout	Republican nominee for Governor of Vermont; 1898	Succeeded by William W. Stickney
Political offices
Preceded by Josiah Grout	Governor of Vermont; 1898–1900	Succeeded by William W. Stickney
