= List of lieutenant governors of Vermont =

Lieutenant Governor of Vermont
- Coat of arms of Vermont

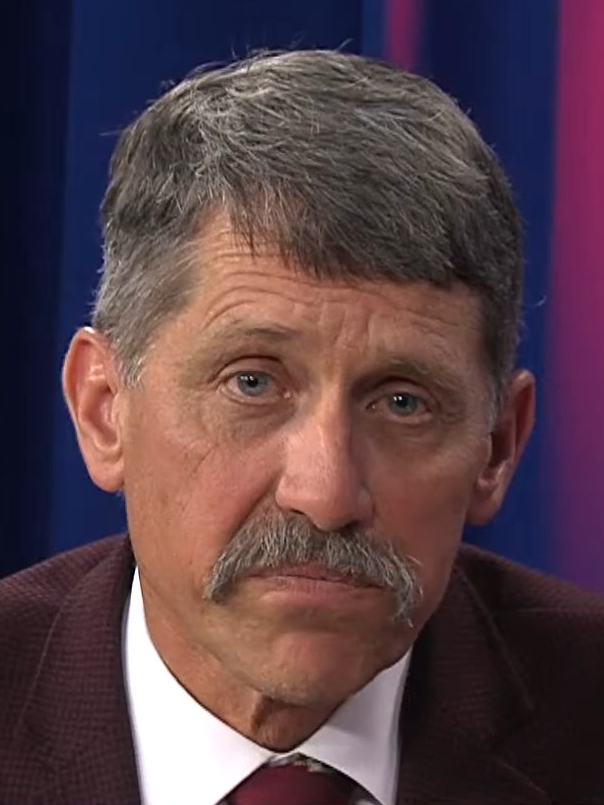
- Incumbent; John S. Rodgers since January 9, 2025
- Term length: Two years, no term limit
- Inaugural holder: Jonathan Hunt
- Formation: 1791; Constitution of Vermont
- Salary: $99,489

The lieutenant governor of Vermont is elected for a two-year term and chosen separately from the governor. The Vermont lieutenant governor's main responsibilities include acting as governor when the governor is out of state or incapacitated, presiding over the Vermont Senate, casting tie-breaking votes in the Senate when required, and acceding to the governorship in case of a vacancy. As a member of the state senate's Committee on Committees, the lieutenant governor plays a role in determining committee assignments for individual senators, as well as selecting committee chairs, vice chairs, and clerks.

The incumbent lieutenant governor is John S. Rodgers, a Republican who was first elected in 2024.

== Election ==
The lieutenant governor of Vermont is elected to a two-year term in even-numbered years, as with the governor, but they are elected on separate tickets, and may be from different parties. The most recent lieutenant gubernatorial election took place on November 5, 2024.

When no candidate receives a majority of the votes, the General Assembly holds a contingent election from among the top three vote-getters. In every such election since the election of T. Garry Buckley in 1976, the General Assembly has chosen the candidate who received a plurality of votes, including in the 2024 election.

=== Mountain rule ===
From the founding of the Republican Party in the 1850s until the 1960s only Republicans won general elections for Vermont's statewide offices. One method that made this possible was imposition of the "Mountain Rule." Under the provisions of the Mountain Rule, one U.S. Senator was a resident of the east side of the Green Mountains and one resided on the west side, and the governorship and lieutenant governorship alternated between residents of the east and west side. Nominees for governor and lieutenant governor were allowed two one-year terms, and later one two-year term. For nearly 100 years likely Republican candidates for office in Vermont agreed to abide by the Mountain Rule in the interests of party unity.

Several factors led to the eventual weakening of the Mountain Rule, including: the longtime political dispute between the Proctor (conservative) and Aiken-Gibson (liberal) wings of the party; primaries rather than conventions to select nominees; the direct election of U.S. Senators; and several active third parties, including the Progressives, the Prohibition Party, and the Local Option movement. In the 1960s the rise of the Vermont Democratic Party and the construction of Interstate 89 also contributed to the end of the Mountain Rule. Though I-89 is a north–south route, it traverses Vermont from east to west and changed the way Vermonters view how the state is divided.

== Vacancies ==
Vermont has no provision for filling the lieutenant governor's office in the event of a vacancy, and it has been vacant five times. Thomas Chittenden died in August 1797 while serving as governor, and Lieutenant Governor Paul Brigham served until the end of Chittenden's term in October. Brigham, the winner of that year's September election for lieutenant governor, began his new term in October and was succeeded as governor by Isaac Tichenor. In February 1870, Governor Peter T. Washburn died and George Whitman Hendee became governor. The lieutenant governor's office remained vacant until George N. Dale, the winner of that September's election, took office in October. In November 1927, Lieutenant Governor Hollister Jackson died in the Great Vermont Flood of 1927, and the position remained vacant until Stanley C. Wilson took office in January 1929. In January 1950, Governor Ernest W. Gibson Jr. resigned and Harold J. Arthur became governor. The lieutenant governor's office was vacant until Joseph B. Johnson, the winner of the 1950 election, took office in January 1951. In August 1991, Governor Richard A. Snelling died and Howard Dean succeeded him. The lieutenant governorship remained vacant until Snelling's widow Barbara, the winner of the 1992 election, took office in January 1993.

== List of lieutenant governors ==
This is a list of lieutenant governors of Vermont in chronological order:

=== Vermont Republic ===
#	Image	Name	Party	Term	Governor(s) served under
1		Joseph Marsh	—	1778–1779	Thomas Chittenden
2		Benjamin Carpenter	—	1779–1781	Thomas Chittenden
3		Elisha Payne	—	1781–1782	Thomas Chittenden
4		Paul Spooner	—	1782–1787	Thomas Chittenden
5		Joseph Marsh	—	1787–1790	Moses Robinson
6		Peter Olcott	—	1790–1791	Thomas Chittenden

=== State of Vermont ===
#	Image	Name	Party	Term	Governor(s) served under
1		Peter Olcott	—	1791–1794	Thomas Chittenden
2		Jonathan Hunt	—	1794–1796	Thomas Chittenden
3		Paul Brigham	Democratic-Republican	1796–1813	Thomas Chittenden
3		Paul Brigham	Democratic-Republican	1796–1813	himself
3		Paul Brigham	Democratic-Republican	1796–1813	Isaac Tichenor (F)
3		Paul Brigham	Democratic-Republican	1796–1813	Israel Smith (D-R)
3		Paul Brigham	Democratic-Republican	1796–1813	Isaac Tichenor (F)
3		Paul Brigham	Democratic-Republican	1796–1813	Jonas Galusha (D-R)
4		William Chamberlain	Federalist	1813–1815	Martin Chittenden (F)
5		Paul Brigham	Democratic-Republican	1815–1820	Jonas Galusha (D-R)
6		William Cahoon	Democratic-Republican	1820–1822	Richard Skinner (D-R)
7		Aaron Leland	Democratic-Republican	1822–1827	Richard Skinner (D-R)
7		Aaron Leland	Democratic-Republican	1822–1827	Cornelius P. Van Ness (D-R)
7		Aaron Leland	Democratic-Republican	1822–1827	Ezra Butler (NR)
8		Henry Olin	Democratic-Republican	1827–1830	Ezra Butler (NR)
9		Mark Richards	National Republican	1830–1831	Samuel C. Crafts (NR)
10		Lebbeus Egerton	Anti-Masonic	1831–1835	William A. Palmer (A-M)
11		Silas H. Jennison	Whig / Anti-Masonic	1835–1836	Silas H. Jennison (W)
12		David M. Camp	Whig	1836–1841	Silas H. Jennison (W)
13		Waitstill R. Ranney	Whig	1841–1843	Charles Paine (W)
14		Horace Eaton	Whig	1843–1846	John Mattocks (W)
14		Horace Eaton	Whig	1843–1846	William Slade (W)
15		Leonard Sargeant	Whig	1846–1848	Horace Eaton (W)
16		Robert Pierpoint	Whig	1848–1850	Carlos Coolidge (W)
17		Julius Converse	Whig	1850–1852	Charles K. Williams (W)
18		William C. Kittredge	Whig	1852–1853	Erastus Fairbanks (W)
19		Jefferson P. Kidder	Democratic	1853–1854	John S. Robinson (D)
20		Ryland Fletcher	Republican	1854–1856	Stephen Royce (R)
21		James M. Slade	Republican	1856–1858	Ryland Fletcher (R)
22		Burnham Martin	Republican	1858–1860	Hiland Hall (R)
23		Levi Underwood	Republican	1860–1862	Hiland Hall (R)
23		Levi Underwood	Republican	1860–1862	Erastus Fairbanks (R)
24		Paul Dillingham	Republican / National Union	1862–1865	Frederick Holbrook (R)
24		Paul Dillingham	Republican / National Union	1862–1865	J. Gregory Smith (R)
25		Abraham B. Gardner	Republican	1865–1867	Paul Dillingham (R)
26		Stephen Thomas	Republican	1867–1869	John B. Page (R)
27		George W. Hendee	Republican	1869–1870	Peter T. Washburn (R)
28		George N. Dale	Republican	1870–1872	George W. Hendee (R)
28		George N. Dale	Republican	1870–1872	John W. Stewart (R)
29		Russell S. Taft	Republican	1872–1874	Julius Converse (R)
30		Lyman G. Hinckley	Republican	1874–1876	Asahel Peck (R)
31		Redfield Proctor	Republican	1876–1878	Horace Fairbanks (R)
32		Eben Pomeroy Colton	Republican	1878–1880	Redfield Proctor (R)
33		John L. Barstow	Republican	1880–1882	Roswell Farnham (R)
34		Samuel E. Pingree	Republican	1882–1884	John L. Barstow (R)
35		Ebenezer J. Ormsbee	Republican	1884–1886	Samuel E. Pingree (R)
36		Levi K. Fuller	Republican	1886–1888	Ebenezer J. Ormsbee (R)
37		Urban A. Woodbury	Republican	1888–1890	William P. Dillingham (R)
38		Henry A. Fletcher	Republican	1890–1892	Carroll S. Page (R)
39		Farrand Stewart Stranahan	Republican	1892–1894	Levi K. Fuller (R)
40		Zophar M. Mansur	Republican	1894–1896	Urban A. Woodbury (R)
41		Nelson W. Fisk	Republican	1896–1898	Josiah Grout (R)
42		Henry C. Bates	Republican	1898–1900	Edward C. Smith (R)
43		Martin F. Allen	Republican	1900–1902	William W. Stickney (R)
44		Zed S. Stanton	Republican	1902–1904	John G. McCullough (R)
45		Charles H. Stearns	Republican	1904–1906	Charles J. Bell (R)
46		George H. Prouty	Republican	1906–1908	Fletcher D. Proctor (R)
47		John A. Mead	Republican	1908–1910	George H. Prouty (R)
48		Leighton P. Slack	Republican	1910–1912	John A. Mead (R)
49		Frank E. Howe	Republican	1912–1915	Allen M. Fletcher (R)
50		Hale K. Darling	Republican	1915–1917	Charles W. Gates (R)
51		Roger W. Hulburd	Republican	1917–1919	Horace F. Graham (R)
52		Mason S. Stone	Republican	1919–1921	Percival W. Clement (R)
53		Abram W. Foote	Republican	1921–1923	James Hartness (R)
54		Franklin S. Billings	Republican	1923–1925	Redfield Proctor Jr. (R)
55		Walter K. Farnsworth	Republican	1925–1927	Franklin S. Billings (R)
56		Samuel Hollister Jackson	Republican	1927–1927	John E. Weeks (R)
57		Stanley C. Wilson	Republican	1929–1931	John E. Weeks (R)
58		Benjamin Williams	Republican	1931–1933	Stanley C. Wilson (R)
59		Charles M. Smith	Republican	1933–1935	Stanley C. Wilson (R)
60		George D. Aiken	Republican	1935–1937	Charles Manley Smith (R)
61		William H. Wills	Republican	1937–1941	George D. Aiken (R)
62		Mortimer R. Proctor	Republican	1941–1945	William H. Wills (R)
63		Lee E. Emerson	Republican	1945–1949	Mortimer R. Proctor (R)
63		Lee E. Emerson	Republican	1945–1949	Ernest W. Gibson Jr. (R)
64		Harold J. Arthur	Republican	1949–1950	Ernest W. Gibson Jr. (R)
65		Joseph B. Johnson	Republican	1951–1955	Lee E. Emerson (R)
66		Consuelo N. Bailey	Republican	1955–1957	Joseph B. Johnson (R)
67		Robert T. Stafford	Republican	1957–1959	Joseph B. Johnson (R)
68		Robert S. Babcock	Republican	1959–1961	Robert T. Stafford (R)
69		Ralph A. Foote	Republican	1961–1965	F. Ray Keyser Jr. (R)
69		Ralph A. Foote	Republican	1961–1965	Philip H. Hoff (D)
70		John J. Daley	Democratic	1965–1969	Philip H. Hoff (D)
71		Thomas L. Hayes	Republican	1969–1971	Deane C. Davis (R)
72		John S. Burgess	Republican	1971–1975	Deane C. Davis (R)
72		John S. Burgess	Republican	1971–1975	Thomas P. Salmon (D)
73		Brian D. Burns	Democratic	1975–1977	Thomas P. Salmon (D)
74		T. Garry Buckley	Republican	1977–1979	Richard Snelling (R)
75		Madeleine Kunin	Democratic	1979–1983	Richard Snelling (R)
76		Peter P. Smith	Republican	1983–1987	Richard Snelling (R)
76		Peter P. Smith	Republican	1983–1987	Madeleine Kunin (D)
77		Howard Dean	Democratic	1987–1991	Madeleine Kunin (D)
77		Howard Dean	Democratic	1987–1991	Richard Snelling (R)
78		Barbara Snelling	Republican	1993–1997	Howard Dean (D)
79		Doug Racine	Democratic	1997–2003	Howard Dean (D)
80		Brian Dubie	Republican	2003–2011	Jim Douglas (R)
81		Phil Scott	Republican	2011–2017	Peter Shumlin (D)
82		David Zuckerman	Progressive–Democratic	2017–2021	Phil Scott (R)
83		Molly Gray	Democratic	2021–2023	Phil Scott (R)
84		David Zuckerman	Progressive–Democratic	2023–2025	Phil Scott (R)
85		John S. Rodgers	Republican	2025–present	Phil Scott (R)
