= Josiah Grout =

American politician (1841-1925)

Josiah Grout Jr.
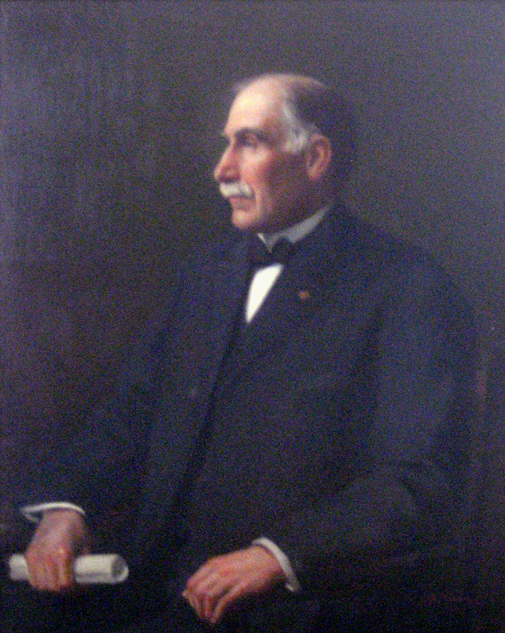
- Official Vermont State House portrait

46th Governor of Vermont
- In office October 8, 1896 – October 6, 1898
- Lieutenant: Nelson W. Fisk
- Preceded by: Urban A. Woodbury
- Succeeded by: Edward C. Smith

Member of the Vermont Senate from Orleans County
- In office 1892–1894 Serving with Amory Davis
- Preceded by: Henry C. Cleveland, Charles W. Wheeler
- Succeeded by: Charles L. Erwin, Willard W. Miles

Speaker of the Vermont House of Representatives
- In office 1886–1890
- Preceded by: James K. Batchelder
- Succeeded by: Henry R. Start
- In office 1874–1876
- Preceded by: H. Henry Powers
- Succeeded by: John W. Stewart

Personal details
- Born: May 28, 1841 Compton, Lower Canada, British Canada
- Died: July 19, 1925 (aged 84) Newport, Vermont, U.S.
- Party: Republican
- Spouse: Harriet Hinman (m. 1867; died 1922)
- Relations: William W. Grout (brother)
- Children: Aaron H. Grout
- Profession: Lawyer

Military service
- Allegiance: United States (Union)
- Service: Union Army
- Years of service: 1861–1863, 1865
- Rank: Major
- Unit: 1st Vermont Cavalry; Vermont Frontier Cavalry
- Commands: Company M, Vermont Frontier Cavalry
- Wars: American Civil War

Josiah Grout Jr. (May 28, 1841 – July 19, 1925) was an American lawyer and politician from Vermont. A Republican, he served multiple terms in the Vermont House of Representatives and Vermont Senate, including holding the leadership post of Speaker from 1874 to 1876 and 1886 to 1890. He served as governor from 1896 to 1898.

== Early life ==
Grout was born in Compton in the British Canadian Province of Lower Canada on May 28, 1841, a son of Josiah and Sophronia (Ayer) Grout. His parents were native Vermonters, and they returned to Vermont when Grout was six years old. He received his early education in the public schools and at Orleans Liberal Institute at Glover, Vermont. He was a student at St. Johnsbury Academy when the Civil War broke out, and he left to enlist in the Union Army for the American Civil War.

== Military service ==
On October 2, 1861, Grout joined Company I, 1st Vermont Cavalry as a private. On October 22, he received his commission as a second lieutenant later that month, and was promoted to first lieutenant on April 25, 1862. He was promoted to captain on April 4, 1863. Grout took part in 17 battles and was wounded in the Skirmish at Miskel Farm on April 1, 1863. Grout requested return to his regiment, but on October 1, 1863, he was discharged due to his wounds. After the Confederate St. Albans Raid in late 1864, in January 1865, Grout was commissioned as a captain and assigned to command Company M, Vermont Frontier Cavalry, which performed patrol duty along the Canadian borders with New York and Vermont. He was promoted to major in March 1865 and mustered out in June 1865.

== Career ==
After the war, Grout studied law in Barton with his brother, William W. Grout. He was admitted to the bar in December 1865, and in 1866 moved to Island Pond, where he was in charge of customs collections for the districts of Newport and St. Albans.

In October 1867, he married Harriet Hinman, daughter of Aaron and Nancy (Stewart) Hinman. In 1874, he moved to Chicago, and afterward to Moline, Illinois, where he was one of the supervisors of Rock Island County for two years. He returned to Vermont in 1880, where he took up farming, and raised some of the finest Jersey cattle, blooded Morgan horses and Shropshire sheep in Vermont.

A Republican, Grout represented Newport in the Vermont House of Representatives in 1872 and 1874, and Derby in 1884, 1886 and 1888. In 1874, 1886 and 1888 he was Speaker of the House. He was elected to the Vermont Senate from Orleans County in 1892. Grout was also head of the Republican Club of Derby and was vice president of the Vermont League of Republican Clubs for four years, and president for one.

At the Republican State Convention on June 17, 1896, Grout was narrowly nominated as the party's candidate for governor, receiving 339 votes compared to William W. Stickney's 336. He easily beat Democrat J. Henry Jackson in the general election, receiving 53,426 votes (76.4%) to Jackson's 14,855 (21.2%). Grout's term was highlighted by enhancement to the state's educational system, a visit to the Tennessee Centennial Exposition. The Spanish–American War broke out during Grout's term, and at the start of the war Grout tended the services of a regiment of infantry and a battery of six guns from the Vermont Militia, which was accepted by the federal government. On May 21, 1898, he dispatched a regiment of 47 officers and 980 men to the war. Due to the short duration of the war, however, the Vermont regiment saw no active service and returned to the state on August 21, where it was reviewed by Grout at Camp Ethan Allen. In October 1898, Grout was succeeded by Edward Curtis Smith. In 1898, Grout received the honorary degree of LL.D. from the University of Vermont, and he received an honorary LL.D. from Norwich University in 1899.

Grout again represented Derby in the Vermont House in 1904. Grout died in Newport on July 19, 1925. He was buried at Derby Center Cemetery. His son Aaron H. Grout, served as Vermont Secretary of State from 1923 to 1927.

== See also ==
- Vermont in the Civil War

== Additional reading ==
- Crockett, Walter Hill, Vermont The Green Mountain State, New York: The Century History Company, Inc., 1921, pp. iv:162, 177, 242, 244–245, 248, 250, 257–260, 268,-269, 293, 295–296, 299.
- Dodge, Prentiss C., compiler. Encyclopedia Vermont Biography 1912, Burlington, VT: Ullery Publishing Company, 1912, p. 49.
- Peck, Theodore S., compiler, Revised Roster of Vermont Volunteers and lists of Vermonters Who Served in the Army and Navy of the United States During the War of the Rebellion, 1861–66. Montpelier, VT.: Press of the Watchman Publishing Co., 1892, pp. 253, 656–657.

Party political offices
Preceded by Urban A. Woodbury	Republican nominee for Governor of Vermont; 1896	Succeeded by Edward Curtis Smith
Political offices
Preceded by Urban A. Woodbury	Governor of Vermont; 1896–1898	Succeeded by Edward C. Smith
