= Urban A. Woodbury =

American politician

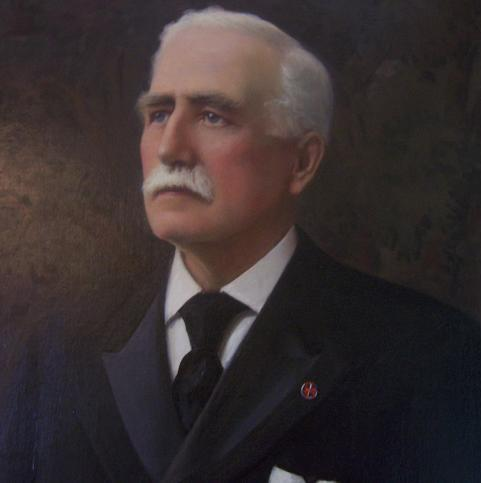
- Official Vermont State House portrait

45th Governor of Vermont
- In office October 4, 1894 – October 8, 1896
- Lieutenant: Zophar M. Mansur
- Preceded by: Levi K. Fuller
- Succeeded by: Josiah Grout

37th Lieutenant Governor of Vermont
- In office October 4, 1888 – October 2, 1890
- Governor: William P. Dillingham
- Preceded by: Levi K. Fuller
- Succeeded by: Henry A. Fletcher

9th Mayor of Burlington, Vermont
- In office April 6, 1885 – April 3, 1887
- Preceded by: George H. Morse
- Succeeded by: William W. Henry

Personal details
- Born: Urban Andrain Woodbury; July 11, 1838 Acworth, New Hampshire
- Died: April 15, 1915 (aged 76) Burlington, Vermont
- Resting place: Lakeview Cemetery; Burlington, Vermont
- Party: Republican
- Spouse: Paulina L. Darling
- Children: 6
- Education: University of Vermont
- Profession: Businessman

Military service
- Allegiance: United States of America (Union) Vermont
- Branch/service: Union Army; Vermont Militia
- Years of service: 1861–1865 (Army); 1882-1884 (Militia)
- Rank: Captain (Army); Colonel (Militia)
- Unit: Company H, 2nd Vermont Infantry; Company D, 11th Vermont Infantry; Veteran Reserve Corps; Staff of Governor John L. Barstow
- Battles/wars: American Civil War: First Battle of Bull Run

Urban Andrain Woodbury (July 11, 1838 – April 15, 1915) was an American Civil War veteran, an entrepreneur and a U.S. politician of the Republican Party. He served as mayor of Burlington, 37th lieutenant governor, and as the 45th governor of Vermont.

A native of Acworth, New Hampshire, Woodbury was raised and educated in Morrisville, Vermont and received his medical degree from the University of Vermont in 1859. In 1861, Woodbury enlisted in the Union Army for the American Civil War and quickly rose to first sergeant of Company H, 2nd Vermont Infantry Regiment. He was wounded at the First Battle of Bull Run and lost his right arm. Woodbury later served as commander of Company D, 11th Vermont Infantry with the rank of captain, and then joined the Veteran Reserve Corps, with which he served until the end of the war.

After his wartime service, Woodbury became a resident of Burlington, Vermont and embarked on a long career in the lumber business. In addition, he became proprietor of the Van Ness House, Burlington's largest hotel. He also served as an executive or director of several other Burlington businesses. A Republican, Woodbury served as a Burlington alderman and president of the board of aldermen. From 1885 to 1887, he was mayor of Burlington. From 1888 to 1890, Woodbury served as lieutenant governor. From 1894 to 1896, he served as governor.

After leaving office, Woodbury resumed his business interests. He maintained an interest in politics and government, including service on a commission that investigated the United States Department of War's activities during the Spanish–American War and member of the board of visitors at the United States Military Academy. Woodbury died in Burlington on April 15, 1915 and was buried at Lakeview Cemetery in Burlington.

== Early life ==
Urban A. Woodbury was born in Acworth, New Hampshire on July 11, 1838. His father, Albert M. Woodbury, was a native of Cavendish, Vermont. His mother, Lucy Lestina Wadleigh, was originally from East Bolton, Quebec. Woodbury was descended from Massachusetts colonial governors Simon Bradstreet and Thomas Dudley. He was also a descendant of John Porter, a founder of Rhode Island. He was educated in Morristown and Morrisville and graduated from the medical department of the University of Vermont in 1859. Woodbury intended on a career as a physician, but he never practiced medicine because he decided to enlist in the Union Army for the American Civil War.

== Military service ==
Woodbury enlisted as a private on May 25, 1861, and was soon promoted to sergeant, then first sergeant of Company H, 2nd Vermont Infantry Regiment. He fought at the July 21 First Battle of Bull Run, where he lost his right arm after being struck by a fragment from an exploding artillery shell, thus becoming Vermont's first Empty Sleeve. Woodbury was captured, and after nearly three months in prison in Richmond, Virginia, he was paroled on October 5, 1861. He was discharged on account of wounds on October 18.

In November 1862, Woodbury accepted a commission as a captain and was assigned as commander of Company D, 11th Vermont Infantry. He transferred to the Veteran Reserve Corps on June 17, 1863, and resigned from the service March 27, 1865.

== Business career ==
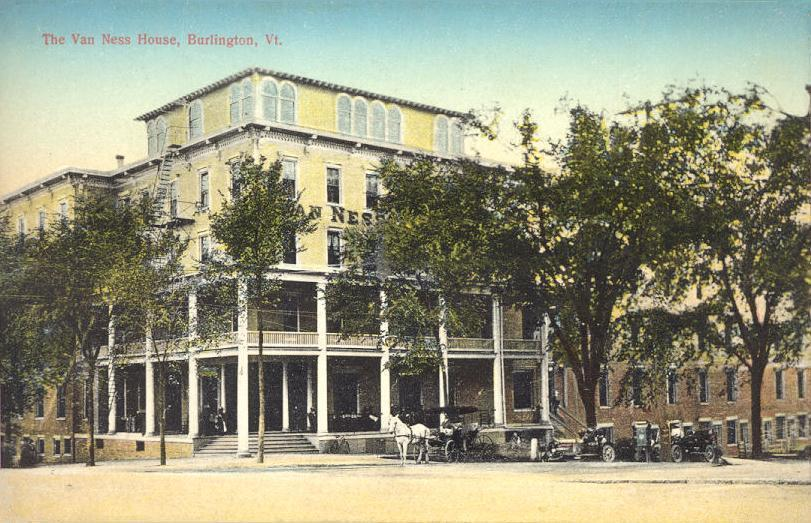
Woodbury's Van Ness House, built in 1870, once the largest hotel in Burlington.

After returning from the war, Woodbury settled in Burlington and engaged in the lumber and hotel businesses. From 1865 to 1874, he was associated with Shepard, Davis & Co., which included two years as the company's representative in Ottawa, Canada. From 1874 to 1876, he was employed by C. Blodgett & Sons. He then worked for 19 years as manager of the Booth Lumber Company, and for 35 years he was the owner and proprietor of the Van Ness House, a hotel he enlarged twice, enabling it to accommodate 400 guests.

Woodbury's other business activities included serving as president of the Mead Manufacturing Company, Crystal Confectionery Company, and Queen City Cotton Company.

== Political career ==
A Republican, he was elected alderman in Burlington's 2nd Ward in 1881 and 1882, and he was president of the board in his second year. From 1884 to 1886, he served as a colonel on the staff of Governor John L. Barstow. He was mayor of Burlington in 1885 and 1886. In 1888, Woodbury was elected lieutenant governor, and he served until 1890.

In 1894, Woodbury was the successful Republican nominee for governor. He served until 1896, the single two-year term available under the provisions of the party's "Mountain Rule". During his governorship, he approved legislation to provide free text books for public schools. In addition, he approved legislation that empowered the governor to appoint a Board of Library Commissioners, as well as legislation that created the State Board of Pharmacy.

In 1898, Woodbury was appointed by President William McKinley to the commission led by General Grenville Dodge, which investigated the conduct of the War Department in the Spanish–American War. During the presidential administration of Theodore Roosevelt, Woodbury was appointed to the United States Military Academy's Board of Visitors.

== Civic and fraternal memberships ==
Woodbury was active in Freemasonry and attained the 32nd degree of the Scottish Rite. His other fraternal associations included IOOF, Grand Army of the Republic, Military Order of the Loyal Legion of the United States, General Society of Colonial Wars, Sons of the American Revolution, and Knights of Pythias. Woodbury was also an early member of the Green Mountain Club which was established at a meeting in the Van Ness House in 1910.

Woodbury hosted three U.S. presidents during their visits to Burlington. In August 1897, William McKinley toured Vermont at the invitation of Senator Redfield Proctor, and McKinley was Woodbury's guest during his stop in Burlington. In September 1902, Theodore Roosevelt visited Vermont while on a speaking tour, and Woodbury was the host during Roosevelt's stay in Burlington. In July 1909, William Howard Taft visited Burlington during the tercentenary celebration of Samuel de Champlain first encountering Lake Champlain, and Woodbury was Taft's host.

== Death and burial ==
Woodbury became ill in early 1915, and in February he traveled to the Battle Creek Sanitarium in Michigan to seek a cure. He had several strokes soon after beginning a course of treatment, and when it was clear he would not recover, Woodbury asked to be brought back to Burlington so he could pass his final days at his own home. He died in Burlington on April 15, 1915. Woodbury was buried at Lakeview Cemetery in Burlington.

== Family ==
On February 12, 1860, Woodbury married Paulina L. Darling, daughter of Ira and Sarah Darling of Elmore, Vermont. They were the parents of six children: Charles, Minnie, Gertrude, Edward, Lila, and Mildred.

Gertrude Woodbury (1872–1962) was the wife of George M. Powers, who served as an associate justice of the Vermont Supreme Court.

== Sources ==
- Benedict, G. G., Vermont in the Civil War. A History of the part taken by the Vermont Soldiers And Sailors in the War For The Union, 1861–65, Burlington, VT: The Free Press Association, 1888, i:77, 83; ii:343.
- "Ex-Gov. U. A. Woodbury Prominently Identified With Business Interests of Burlington," Bennington (VT) Banner, April 17, 1915
- "Last Honors Paid, Funeral of the Late Governor Woodbury Held Sunday," Bennington (VT) Banner, April 20, 1915
- Peck, Theodore S., compiler, Revised Roster of Vermont Volunteers and lists of Vermonters Who Served in the Army and Navy of the United States During the War of the Rebellion, 1861–66. Montpelier, VT.: Press of the Watchman Publishing Co., 1892, pp. 56, 424, 733.

== See also ==
- Vermont in the Civil War

Party political offices
Preceded by Levi K. Fuller	Republican nominee for Lieutenant Governor of Vermont; 1888	Succeeded by Henry A. Fletcher
Preceded by Levi K. Fuller	Republican nominee for Governor of Vermont; 1894	Succeeded by Josiah Grout
Political offices
Preceded by Levi K. Fuller	Governor of Vermont; 1894–1896	Succeeded by Josiah Grout
Preceded by Levi K. Fuller	Lieutenant Governor of Vermont; 1888–1890	Succeeded by Henry A. Fletcher
Preceded by George H. Morse	Mayor of Burlington, Vermont; 1885–1887	Succeeded by William W. Henry
