= Levi K. Fuller =

American politician (1841–1896)

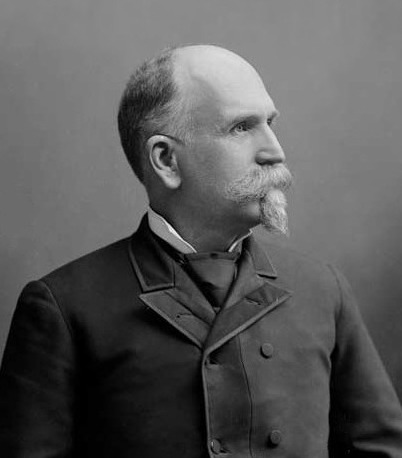

44th Governor of Vermont
- In office October 6, 1892 – October 4, 1894
- Lieutenant: F. Stewart Stranahan
- Preceded by: Carroll S. Page
- Succeeded by: Urban A. Woodbury

36th Lieutenant Governor of Vermont
- In office October 7, 1886 – October 4, 1888
- Governor: F. Stewart Stranahan
- Preceded by: Ebenezer J. Ormsbee
- Succeeded by: Urban A. Woodbury

Member of the Vermont Senate
- In office 1880–1882 Serving with Jabez Delano Bridgman
- Preceded by: Dan P. Webster, Alvin B. Franklin
- Succeeded by: Julius J. Estey, William B. Cutting
- Constituency: Windham County

Personal details
- Born: Levi Knight Fuller; February 24, 1841 Westmoreland, New Hampshire, U.S.
- Died: October 10, 1896 (aged 55) Brattleboro, Vermont, U.S.
- Resting place: Morningside Cemetery, Brattleboro, Vermont, U.S.
- Party: Republican
- Spouse: Abigail Emily Estey (m. 1865–1896)
- Occupation: Engineer; Inventor; Executive, Estey Organ Company
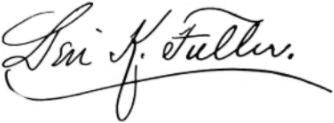
- Signature

Military service
- Service: Vermont National Guard
- Years of service: 1864–1892
- Rank: Captain (National Guard); Colonel (Brevet)
- Unit: Staff of Governor Julius Converse
- Commands: Fuller Light Battery; Company C, 1st Regiment

Levi K. Fuller (February 24, 1841 – October 10, 1896) was an American businessman, military officer, and politician. A Republican, he served in the Vermont Senate from 1880 to 1882, as lieutenant governor from 1886 to 1888, and the 44th governor of Vermont from 1892 to 1894.

A native of Westmoreland, New Hampshire, Fuller was raised in Westmoreland and in Bellows Falls, Vermont. He began working at age 13, and completed apprenticeships in printing and telegraphy while still a teenager, in addition to completing evening school courses in engineering, mechanics, and electricity. In 1860, he began working at the Estey Organ Company in Brattleboro, Vermont; he soon became head of manufacturing, and was later appointed the company's vice president. In addition to his work for Estey, Fuller operated a machine shop and became a successful manufacturer of sewing machines and wood planers. Fuller invented more than 100 machines and mechanical innovations, including many that improved railroad cars.

A supporter of the Union, Fuller joined the Vermont Militia during the American Civil War, and remained affiliated with the organization until winning the governorship. In the mid-1870s, he became the commander of an artillery battery he personally raised, equipped, and paid, which was later accepted into National Guard service. A Republican in politics, Fuller represented Windham County in the Vermont Senate for one term, 1880 to 1882. From 1886 to 1888, he served as Vermont's lieutenant governor. In 1892, he was elected governor, and he served until 1894.

After serving as governor, Fuller returned to his work at Estey Organ. His health began to fail in 1895, and he died in Brattleboro on October 10, 1896. He was first buried at Prospect Hill Cemetery in Brattleboro. In 1900, his remains were moved to Brattleboro's Morningside Cemetery.

== Early life ==
Levi Knight Fuller was born in Westmoreland, New Hampshire, on February 24, 1841, a son of Washington Fuller and Lucinda (Constantine) Fuller. He was raised in Westmoreland and in Bellows Falls, Vermont. At age 13, he moved to Brattleboro, Vermont to begin working, and became an apprentice at the printing firm of James H. Capen. Fuller learned the printer's trade and was also trained as a telegraph operator, in addition to attending Bellows Falls High School and Brattleboro High School. In 1856, he moved to Boston to become an apprentice machinist, and also worked as a telegrapher in order to pay for evening school studies in engineering and manufacturing. In 1857, Fuller moved to Burlington, Vermont, where he worked as a telegrapher.

== Business career ==
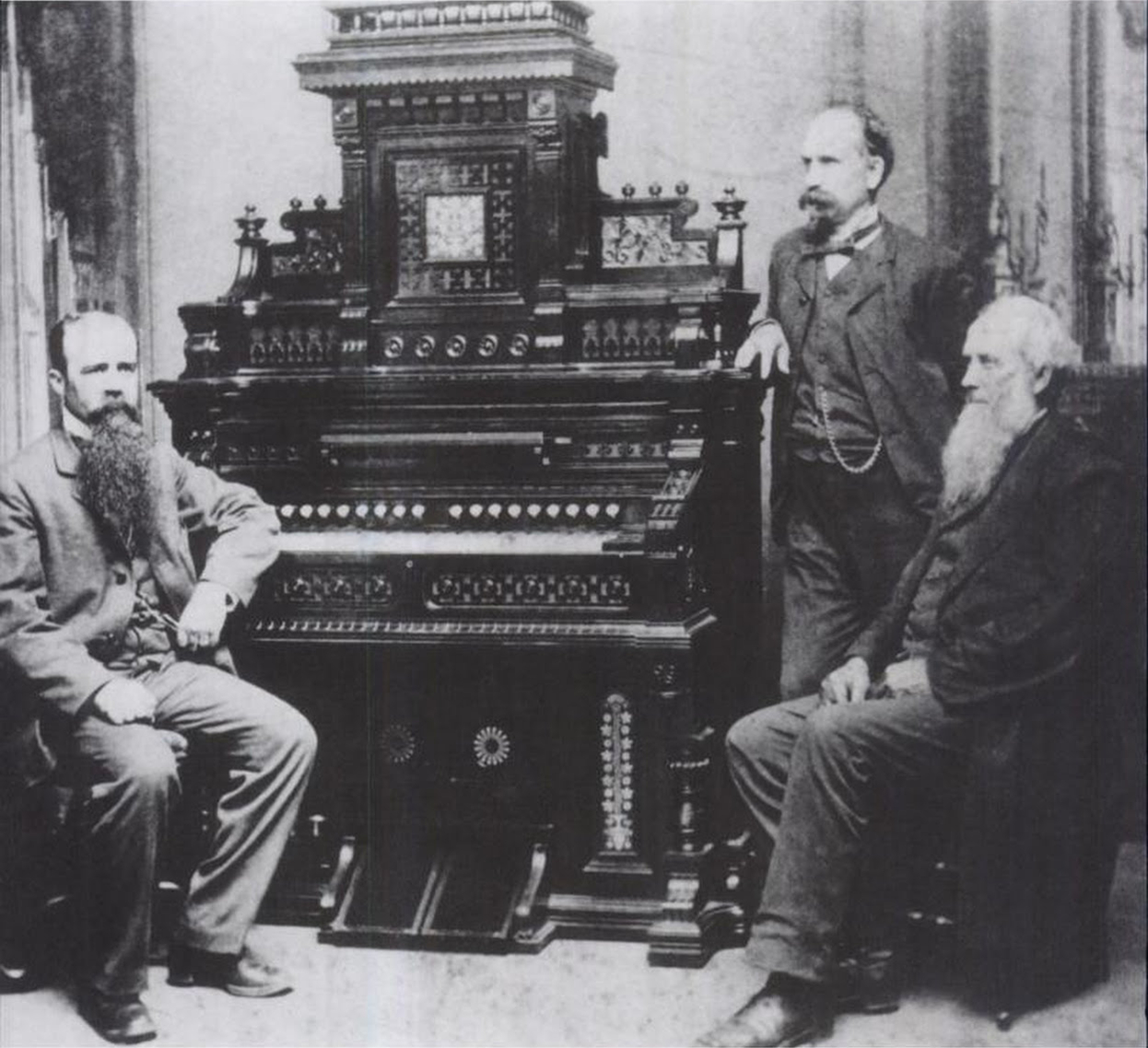
Julius J. Estey, Levi Fuller, and Jacob Estey of Estey Organ

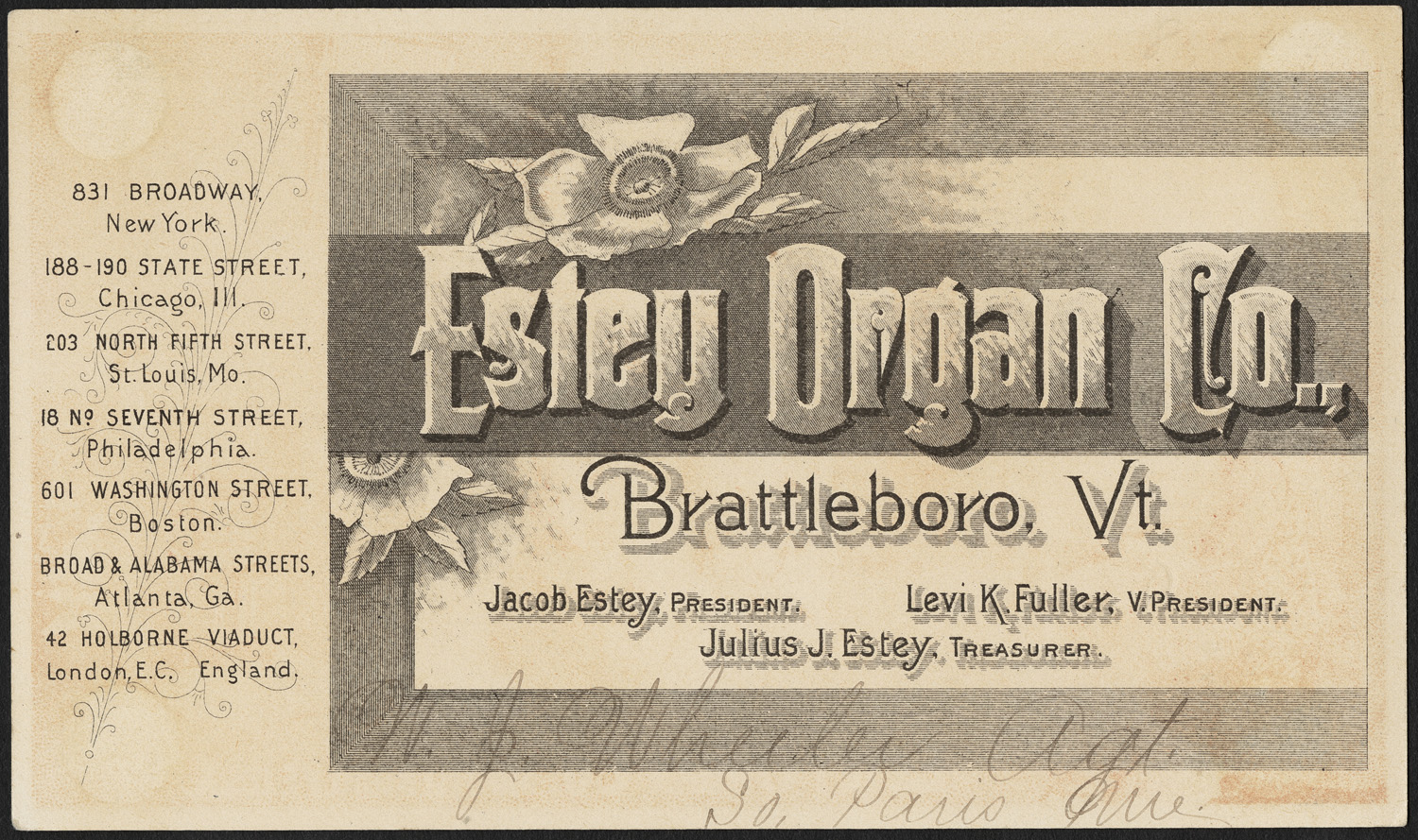
Estey Organ advertising card naming Fuller as company vice president

In 1860, Fuller returned to Brattleboro to begin work as a machinist and engineer with the Estey Organ Company. In May 1865, he married Abby Emily Estey, the daughter of Estey Organ's founder. By 1866, he had been appointed superintendent of the company's manufacturing. By the early 1870s, Fuller was the company's vice president, and his overseas trips on behalf of the company resulted in Estey Organ's expansion into the international market. He patented over one hundred inventions, including international standard pitch, an innovation that was adopted by manufacturers of musical instruments throughout the world, an achievement called by the maker of Steinway pianos "one of the most important, perhaps the most important, in the annals of musical history."

In addition to his work for Estey Organ, Fuller owned and operated his own machine shop. This venture proved successful, and Fuller became a well-known maker of mechanical wood planers and sewing machines. The inventions Fuller created and improved in his shop included railroad car ventilators and dust arresters, recorders for tracking the condition of railway beds, railroad car couplings, hydraulic engines, and timber drying devices. Fuller's additional business activities included serving as a director of the Brattleboro Savings Bank and the National Life Insurance Company. Fuller was also a shareholder in the Brattleboro and Whitehall Railroad, and served as the shareholders' auditor.

== Military career ==
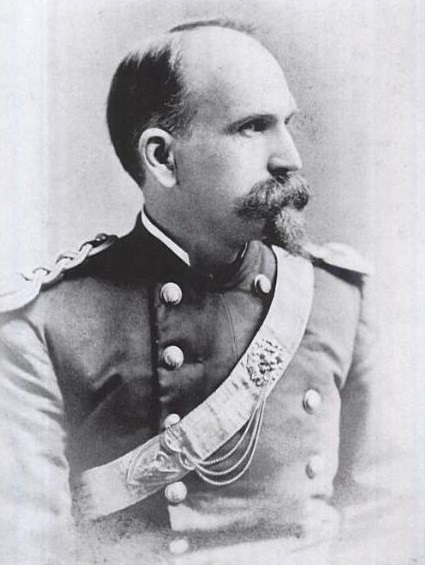
Fuller as commander of Fuller Light Battery, c. 1874

In June 1863, Fuller enrolled for the Union's military draft during the American Civil War. In December 1864, he joined the Vermont Militia's Company A, 12th Regiment, which performed in-state duties during the war. He enlisted as a private, was immediately promoted to sergeant, and continued to serve after the war ended. In 1873, Fuller was appointed a colonel by brevet on the staff of Governor Julius Converse.

In 1874, Fuller organized the Fuller Light Battery. Fuller equipped and funded this unit until it was accepted into the Vermont National Guard in 1875 as Company C, 1st Regiment, which he commanded as a captain. As a result of Fuller's efforts, Vermont's National Guard was the first to field rifled artillery. The Fuller Light Battery was noted for its efficiency and accuracy, and won numerous gunnery competitions.

== Philanthropy and other pursuits ==
Fuller was also an astronomer, and built his own observatory, equatorial telescope, and library. He was a founder of North Carolina's Shaw University, the oldest of the Historically black colleges and universities. Fuller served as a trustee of Brattleboro Free Library, and was president of the Vermont Academy board of trustees. As a result of Fuller's work to develop international standard pitch, he began to collect valuable and rare tuning forks; after his death, his collection of over 300 was valued at $10,000 (about $372,000 in 2024).

Fuller was a member of the American Society of Mechanical Engineers, American Association for the Advancement of Science, Astronomical Society of the Pacific, and American Institute of Electrical Engineers, and American Association for the Advancement of Science. He was president of the Vermont chapter of the Sons of the American Revolution, and a member of the Military Service Institution of the United States. Fuller was also an associate member of the Grand Army of the Republic, and belonged to Brattleboro's Sedgwick Post Number 8.

The University of Vermont conferred on Fuller the honorary degree of Master of Arts in 1893, and Norwich University presented him an honorary LL.D. in 1895. Fuller Hall at Vermont Academy was named in Fuller's honor.

== Political career ==
A Republican, Fuller served in local offices including lister and justice of the peace. He represented Windham County in the Vermont Senate from 1880 to 1882. During his senate term, he was chairman of the committee on finance, on which he took the lead in securing passage of a law to reform Vermont's tax code. In addition, he was a member of the committee on military affairs and the committee on railroads.

In 1886, Fuller was elected lieutenant governor, and he served until 1888. At the end of the 1886 legislative session, senators unanimously adopted a resolution commending Fuller for the tact and fairness he applied to his duties as the senate's presiding officer.

In 1892 Fuller was selected as the Republican nominee for governor. He won the general election and served the single two-year term then available to Vermont governors under the party's "Mountain Rule". Active in the "good roads" movement of the late 19th century, Fuller's term was notable for the creation of Vermont's first statewide effort to regulate their construction and maintenance, the Board of Highway Commissioners. As governor, Fuller also oversaw Vermont's participation in the 1893 World's Columbian Exposition, and traveled to Chicago to visit the state's exhibits.

== Later life and death ==
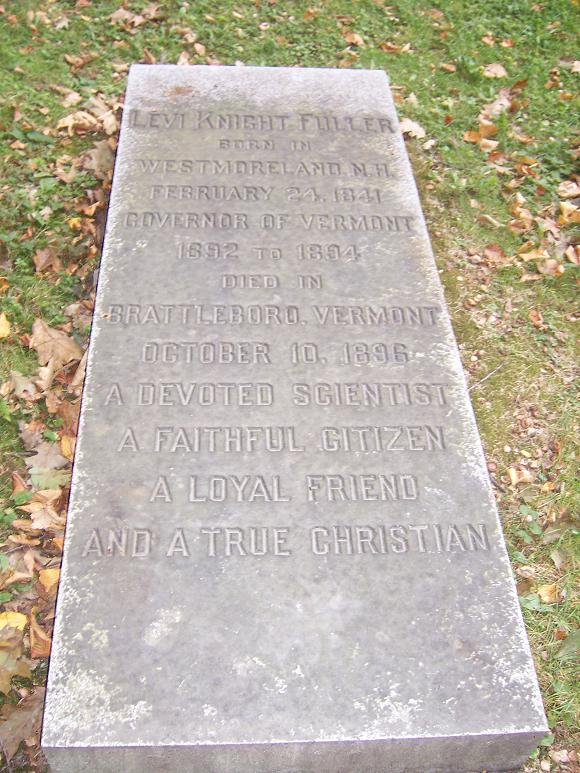
Fuller's gravestone

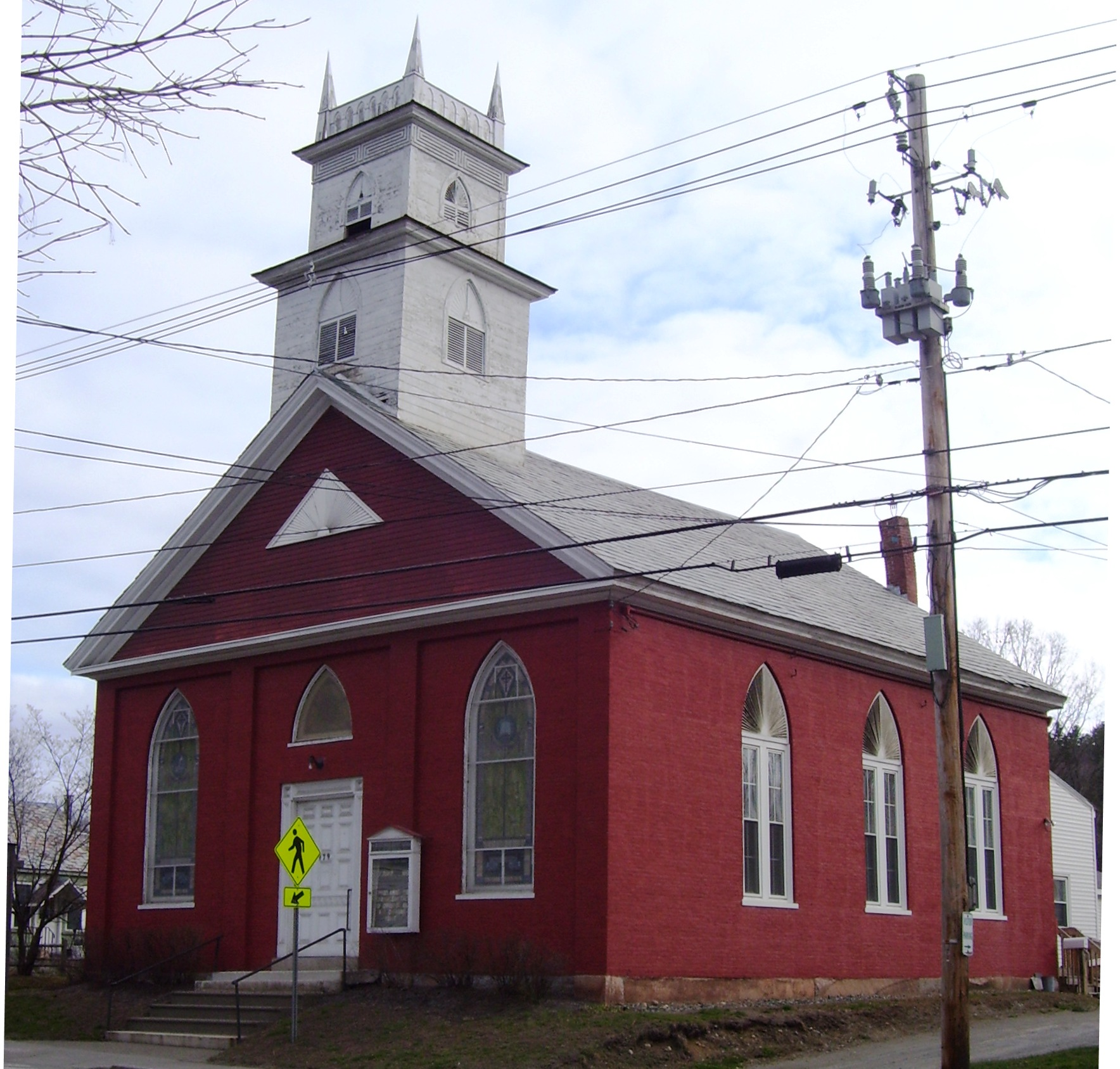
West Brattleboro Baptist Church, in which Fuller was long active

Fuller was a member of the Masons, Knights Templar, Odd Fellows, and Improved Order of Red Men. He was active in the Baptist church and served as moderator of Vermont's State Baptist Convention, in addition to serving as superintendent of the Sunday School at the West Brattleboro Baptist Church. Fuller resided in a Victorian style mansion he called Pine Heights; the site was later redeveloped as the Eden Park Nursing Home.

After serving as governor he returned to his work at Estey Organ. Fuller's death in Brattleboro on October 10, 1896 was attributed to overwork and anemia. He was first interred at Prospect Hill Cemetery, and in 1900 his remains were moved to Morningside Cemetery.

Party political offices
Preceded by Ebenezer J. Ormsbee	Republican nominee for Lieutenant Governor of Vermont; 1886	Succeeded by Urban A. Woodbury
Preceded by Carroll S. Page	Republican nominee for Governor of Vermont; 1892	Succeeded by Urban A. Woodbury
Political offices
Preceded by Ebenezer J. Ormsbee	Lieutenant Governor of Vermont; 1886–1888	Succeeded by Urban A. Woodbury
Preceded by Carroll S. Page	Governor of Vermont; 1892–1894	Succeeded by Urban A. Woodbury
