= Edward John Phelps =

American lawyer and diplomat (1822–1900)

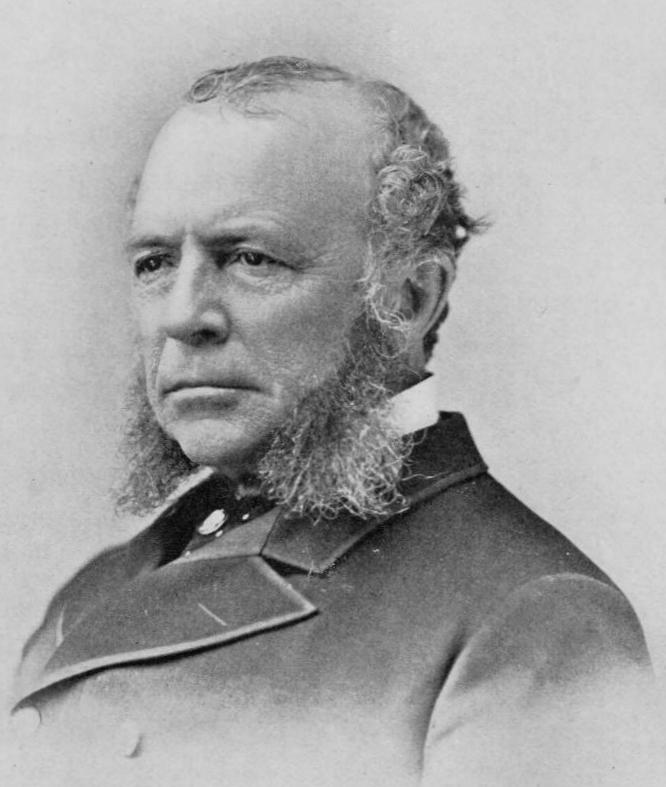

United States Minister to the United Kingdom
- In office May 19, 1885 – January 31, 1889
- President: Grover Cleveland
- Preceded by: James Russell Lowell
- Succeeded by: Robert Todd Lincoln

President of the American Bar Association
- In office 1880–1881
- Preceded by: Benjamin Bristow
- Succeeded by: Clarkson Nott Potter

Second Comptroller of the Treasury
- In office 1851–1853
- Preceded by: Hiland Hall
- Succeeded by: John M. Brodhead

Personal details
- Born: July 11, 1822 Middlebury, Vermont
- Died: March 9, 1900 (aged 77) New Haven, Connecticut
- Resting place: Greenmount Cemetery, Burlington, Vermont
- Party: Whig (before 1854); Democratic (from 1854)
- Spouse: Mary Haight (m. 1845-1900, his death)
- Children: 4
- Parent(s): Samuel S. Phelps; Francis (Shurtleff) Phelps
- Education: Middlebury College; Yale Law School
- Occupation: Attorney

Edward John Phelps (July 11, 1822 – March 9, 1900) was a lawyer and diplomat from Vermont. He is notable for his service as Envoy to Court of St. James's from 1885 to 1889. In addition, Phelps was a founder of the American Bar Association, and served as its president from 1880 to 1881.

A prominent Democrat even as Vermont was trending towards the Republicans, Phelps was the son of Senator Samuel S. Phelps and his first wife, Francis (Shurtleff) Phelps. Edward Phelps graduated from Middlebury College in 1840, taught school in Virginia, and studied for a career as an attorney, first in the office of Middlebury attorney Horatio Seymour, then at Yale Law School. He practiced in Burlington, and served as Second Comptroller of the Treasury from 1851 to 1853. Phelps supported the Union during the American Civil War, but was a critic of what he regarded as the excesses of the Abraham Lincoln administration. He served as a delegate to the Vermont constitutional convention of 1870, and was one of the founders of the American Bar Association. Phelps served as ABA president from 1880 to 1881. In 1880, he was the unsuccessful Democratic nominee for Governor of Vermont.

Phelps was Envoy to Court of St. James's in Britain from 1885 to 1889. He later taught law at Yale Law School, the University of Vermont, and Boston University. He supported Republicans after 1896, in response to his disagreement with the Democratic Party's turn towards the Free Silver movement. He died in New Haven, Connecticut, and was buried at Greenmount Cemetery in Burlington.

== Early life ==
Phelps was born in Middlebury, Vermont on July 11, 1822, the son of Samuel S. Phelps and Francis (Shurtleff) Phelps. He was educated in the schools of Middlebury and then began attendance at Middlebury College, from which he graduated in 1840. He worked as a school teacher and principal in Virginia, then began studying law in the Middlebury office of Horatio Seymour. (Note: Some sources indicate that Phelps studied law with Horatio Seymour of Utica, New York. This is incorrect, because Horatio Seymour of Utica did not practice law after attaining admission to the bar.) Phelps completed his legal studies with a year at Yale Law School, attained admission to the bar in 1843, and began a practice in Middlebury. Phelps moved to Burlington in 1845, where he continued to practice law.

== Start of career ==
Phelps practiced in Burlington with different partners at various times, the most prominent being Lucius E. Chittenden and David Allen Smalley. The Phelps and Smalley firm counted George F. Edmunds among the prospective attorneys who studied law under their tutelage.

Originally a Whig, after that party's demise he became a Democrat. In 1851, Phelps was the successful Whig nominee for state's attorney of Chittenden County, defeating Democrat Leverett B. Englesby in the general election. He received a federal appointment before assuming office, and Aaron B. Maynard filled the vacancy. From 1851 to 1853, Phelps served as Second Comptroller of the Treasury. He then practiced law in New York City as a partner in Wakeman, Latting & Phelps, the senior partner of which was Abram Wakeman. He returned to Burlington in 1857 and resumed practicing law. Phelps served as a delegate to the state constitutional convention in 1870.

Phelps was one of the founders of the American Bar Association and was its president from 1880 to 1881. He also served as a trustee of the Vermont State Library, a position he held for more than 20 years. From 1881 until his death he was Kent Professor of Law at Yale Law School. Phelps lectured on medical jurisprudence at the University of Vermont from 1881 to 1883, and on constitutional law at Boston University from 1882 to 1883.

== Continued career ==
In politics, Phelps was always conservative. He opposed the anti-slavery movement before 1860, the free-silver movement in 1896, when he supported the Republican presidential ticket, and after 1898 becoming an "anti-expansionist" with respect to American foreign policy.

In 1880 Phelps was the Democratic nominee for Governor of Vermont. Democrats were a perpetual minority in Vermont, and lost every statewide election from the 1850s to the 1960s. 1880 was no exception, and Phelps was excoriated as an unrepentant Copperhead:

Had he maintained his resolution to accept no political nomination, the memory of his attitude during the memory of his attitude from 1860 to 1865 might have quite died; but the Democratic nomination and his speech of acceptance, in which, with surprising want of tact, he aired afresh his old hatred of the African and attacked the Southern Republicans, white and black, with a virulence which few Southern Democrats could equal … have brought it into strong prominence. Still stronger light has been thrown on it by the publication of a careful stenographic report of a speech made by Mr. Phelps in September, 1864, before a little club of Copperheads in Burlington. In this he called Mr. Lincoln a 'wooden-head' and a 'twentieth-rate back country attorney,' declared that the North was fighting simply to 'turn loose all the [racial epithet]' and 'whitewash the [racial epithet] in the blood of millions[.]'.

Phelps was Envoy to Court of St. James's in Britain from 1885 to 1889. He was praised for his work as minister, which focused on restoring the congenial relationship the two countries had enjoyed prior to the American Civil War, when relations deteriorated because England was on the verge of formally recognizing the Confederate States of America. Phelps' efforts were continued by his immediate successors, Robert Todd Lincoln and Thomas F. Bayard.

Phelps was elected to the American Academy of Arts and Sciences in 1890. In 1893, Phelps was elected a member of the American Antiquarian Society, a national research library of pre-20th Century American history and culture which was founded in 1876. Also in 1893, he served as senior counsel for the United States before the international tribunal in Paris which considered the Bering Sea Controversy. In 1895, he was appointed to the commission which worked to end the Venezuelan crisis of 1895, in which Venezuela and England disputed the location of the border between Venezuela and British Guiana. That same year, he was elected to the American Philosophical Society.

Phelps was a highly sought after speechmaker and delivered numerous public addresses, among them The United States Supreme Court and the Sovereignty of the People at the centennial celebration of the Federal Judiciary in 1890, and an oration at the dedication of the Bennington Battle Monument, unveiled in 1891 at the centennial of Vermont's admission to the Union.

At the urging of Senator George F. Edmunds, President Grover Cleveland intended to appoint Phelps as U.S. Chief Justice in 1888. Phelps was concerned that his tenure as ambassador in London would cause the Democratic Party to lose the support of Irish Americans, who supported a growing movement for Irish independence, and Cleveland concurred. In addition, New England was already represented on the Supreme Court by Horace Gray; in an era when the government was expected to reflect geographic balance, Cleveland decided to appoint someone from the western states. After considering Phelps and several other candidates, Cleveland nominated Melville Fuller.

== Death and burial ==
Phelps died at his home in New Haven, Connecticut on March 9, 1900. A funeral was held at Battell Chapel on the Yale campus; Theodore T. Munger officiated, and university president Timothy Dwight V delivered the eulogy.

A second service took place at the Cathedral Church of St. Paul in Burlington. Attendees and honorary pall bearers included Edward Curtis Smith, John G. McCullough, Benjamin F. Fifield, and Robert Roberts. Phelps was buried at Greenmount Cemetery in Burlington.

== Family ==
Coat of Arms of John Phelps

In August 1845, Phelps married Mary S. Haight (1827-1909) of Burlington. They were the parents of four children: Edward Haight Phelps (1847–1884), Francis Shurtleff Phelps (1849-1863), Mary Haight Phelps (1855–1911) who married Horatio Loomis, and Charles Pierpont Phelps (1861–1912).

== Legacy ==
=== Professorship ===
In 1887, Junius Spencer Morgan endowed the Edward J. Phelps professorship at Yale University.

=== Honorary degrees ===
In 1870, Middlebury College awarded Phelps the honorary degree of LL.D. In 1881, he received an honorary Master of Arts from Yale University. In 1887, he received honorary LL.D. degrees from the University of Vermont and Harvard University.

=== Quotes ===
"The man who makes no mistakes does not usually make anything." From a speech given at the Mansion House in London on January 24, 1899, quoting Bishop W. C. Magee of Peterborough in 1868.

"Better a hundred times an honest and capable administration of an erroneous policy than a corrupt and incapable administration of a good one." Spoken at a dinner of the New York Chamber of Commerce.

== Notes ==
Party political offices
Preceded by W. H. H. Bingham	Democratic nominee for Governor of Vermont; 1880	Succeeded by George W. Eaton
