= Governor Fairbanks =

Governor Fairbanks may refer to:

- Erastus Fairbanks (1792–1864), 21st Governor of Vermont
- Horace Fairbanks (1820–1888), 36th Governor of Vermont
