= Governor Peck =

Governor Peck may refer to:

- Asahel Peck (1803–1879), 35th Governor of Vermont
- George Wilbur Peck (1840–1916), 17th Governor of Wisconsin
