= 1878 Vermont gubernatorial election =

- September 3, 1878
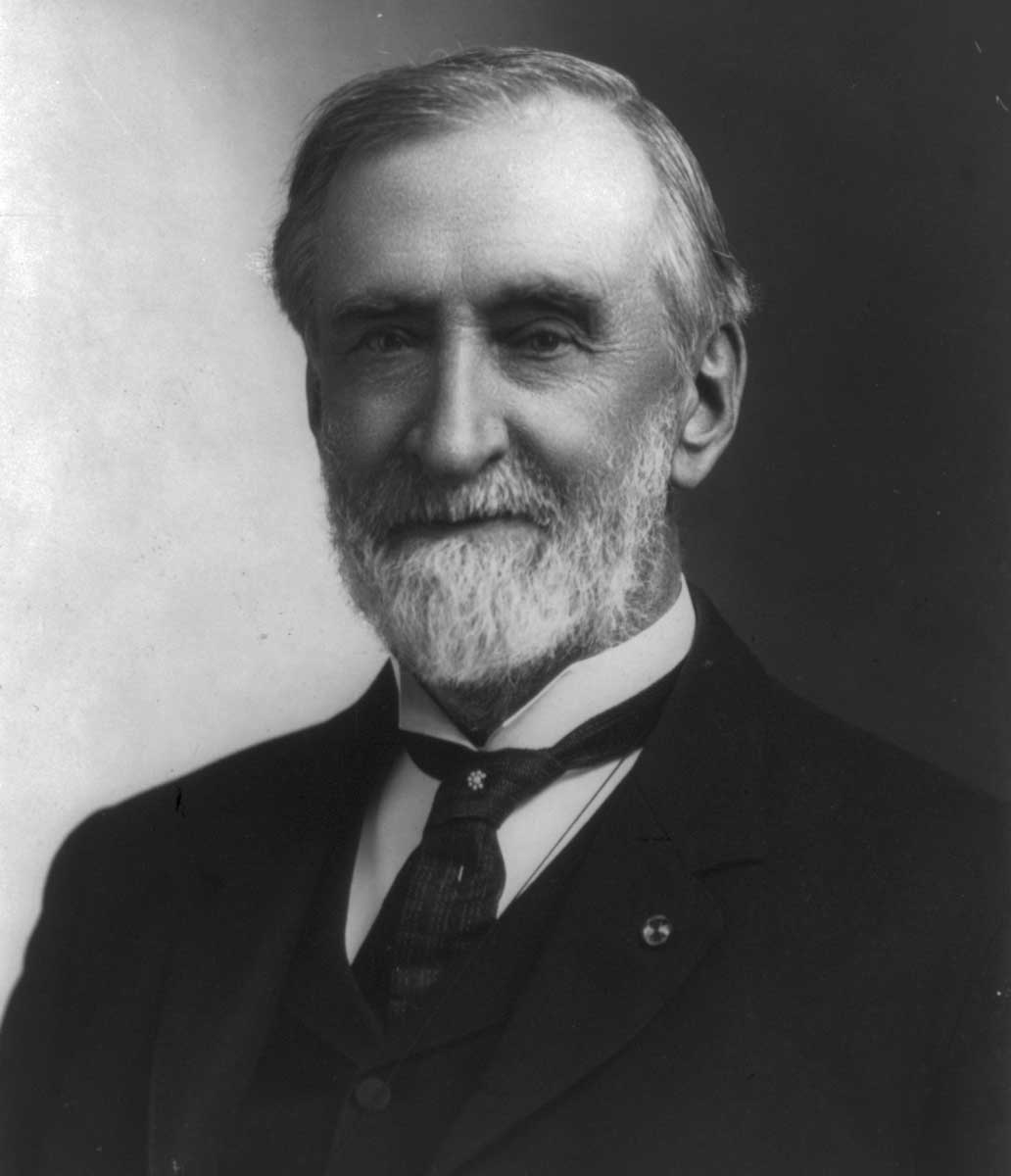

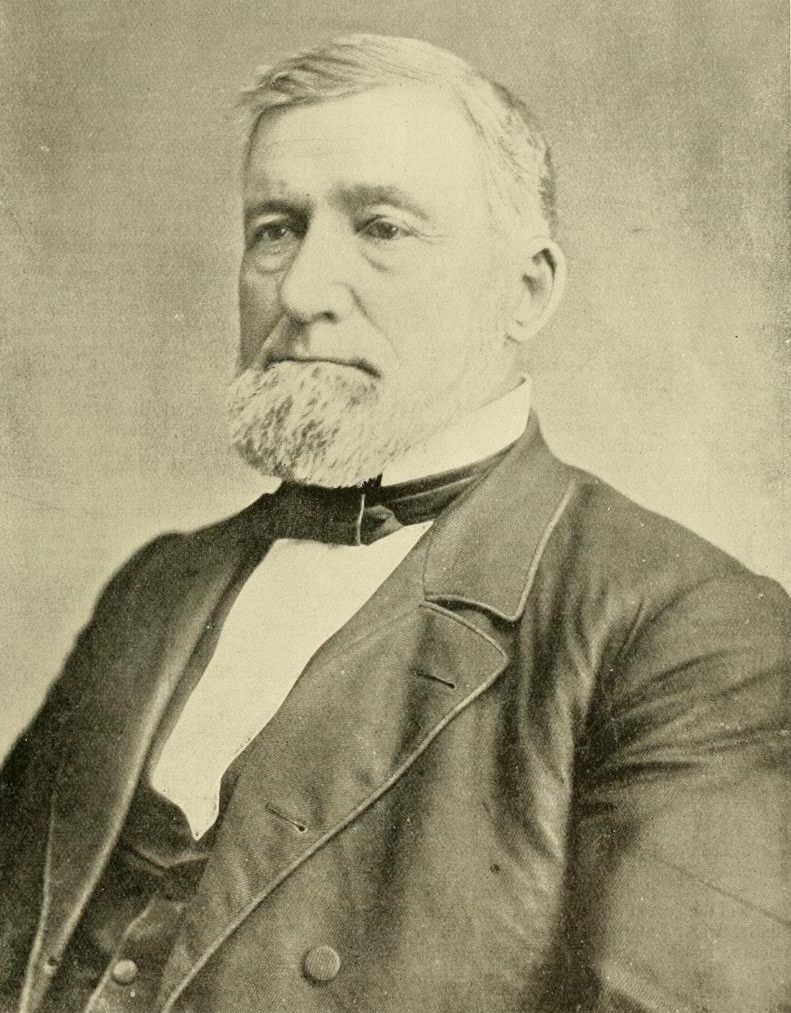
Candidate	Redfield Proctor	W. H. H. Bingham
Party	Republican	Democratic
Popular vote	37,312	17,247
Percentage	64.38%	29.76%
- County results Proctor: 50–60% 60–70% 70–80% 80–90%
Governor before election
Horace Fairbanks
Republican
Elected Governor
Redfield Proctor
Republican

The 1878 Vermont gubernatorial election took place on September 3, 1878. Incumbent Republican Horace Fairbanks, per the "Mountain Rule", did not run for re-election to a second term as Governor of Vermont. Republican candidate Redfield Proctor defeated Democratic candidate W. H. H. Bingham to succeed him.

== Results ==
1878 Vermont gubernatorial election
Party	Candidate	Votes	%	±%
Republican	Redfield Proctor	37,312	64.38	−3.7
Democratic	W. H. H. Bingham	17,247	29.76	−2.1
Greenback	Carlos C. Martin	2,635	4.55	+4.5
Republican	Charles W. Willard	730	1.26	+1.3
N/A	Other	32	0.05	0.0
Total votes		57,956	100.0	–
