= 1880 Vermont gubernatorial election =

- September 7, 1880
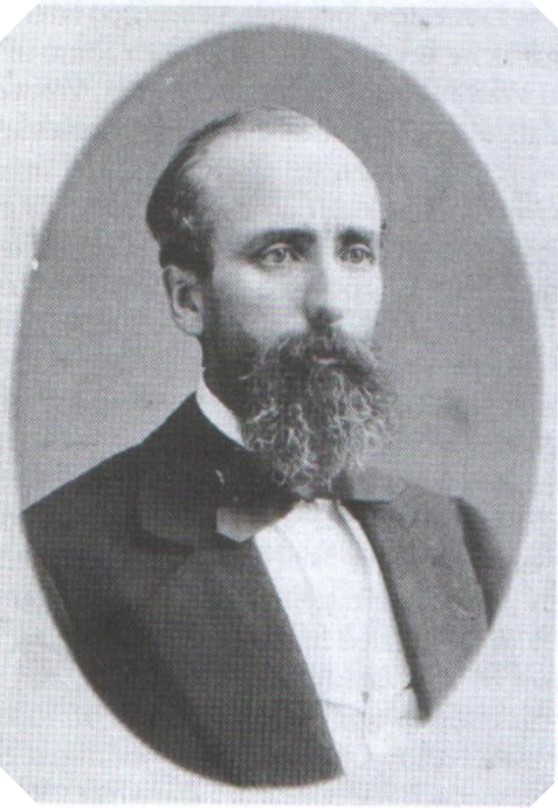

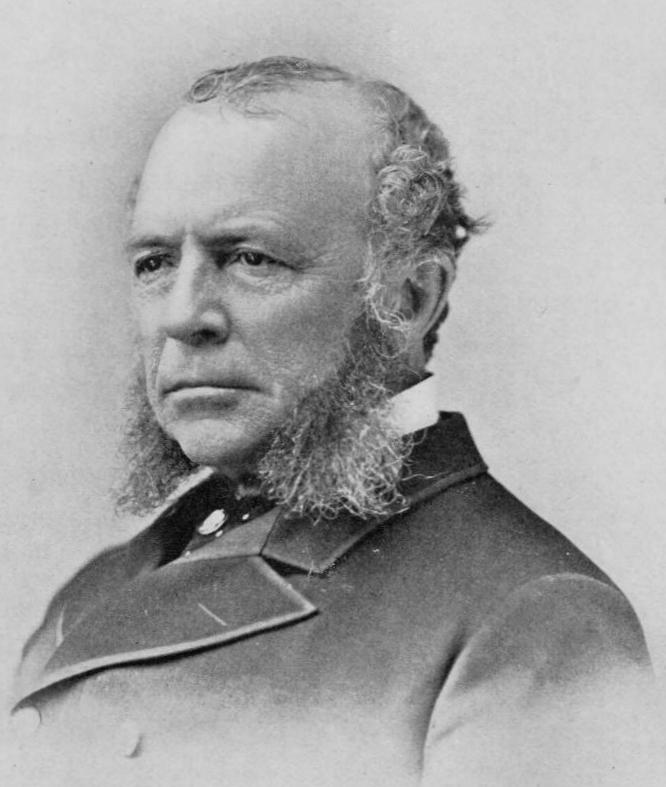
Nominee	Roswell Farnham	Edward J. Phelps
Party	Republican	Democratic
Popular vote	47,848	21,245
Percentage	67.69%	30.06%
- County results Farnham: 60–70% 70–80% 80–90%
Governor before election
Redfield Proctor
Republican
Elected Governor
Roswell Farnham
Republican

The 1880 Vermont gubernatorial election took place on September 7, 1880. Incumbent Republican Redfield Proctor, per the "Mountain Rule", did not run for re-election to a second term as Governor of Vermont. Republican candidate Roswell Farnham defeated Democratic candidate Edward J. Phelps to succeed him.

== Results ==
1880 Vermont gubernatorial election
Party	Candidate	Votes	%	±%
Republican	Roswell Farnham	47,848	67.69	+3.4
Democratic	Edward J. Phelps	21,245	30.06	+0.3
Greenback	Madison O. Heath	1,578	2.23	−2.3
N/A	Other	13	0.02	−0.1
Total votes		70,684	100.0	–
