= Governor Barstow =

Governor Barstow may refer to:

- John L. Barstow (1832–1913), 39th Governor of Vermont
- William A. Barstow (1813–1865), 3rd Governor of Wisconsin
