= Stowe Village Historic District =

Historic district in Vermont, United States

- U.S. National Register of Historic Places
- U.S. Historic district
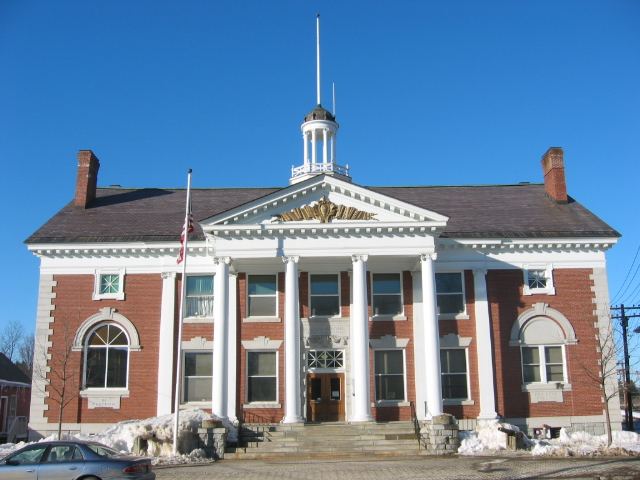
- Stowe Town Hall

- Location within Vermont Location within the United States
- Location: VT 100 and VT 108, Stowe, Vermont
- Coordinates: 44°27′58″N 72°41′9″W
- Area: 153 acres (62 ha)
- Architectural style: Greek Revival, Federal, Late Victorian
- NRHP reference No.: 78000236
- Added to NRHP: November 15, 1978

The Stowe Village Historic District encompasses most of the village center of Stowe, Vermont. Since the 19th century, the village has been one of Vermont's major resort centers, and its center is architecturally reflective of this history. It was listed on the National Register of Historic Places in 1978.

== Description and history ==
The town of Stowe was settled in the early 19th century, with the first building in what is now village center a tavern built in 1811. This area was better suited for both industry and the growth of a village than older settlements to the north and south, and it was recognized in the 1840s as the town center by the placement of the post office. The tourist trade arose early in the town, with visitors drawn to the mountain scenery, promoted by W. H. H. Bingham, builder of the large Mount Mansfield Hotel in 1864 (burned down in 1889), the Summit Hotel on Mount Mansfield, and roads to Mount Mansfield and Smugglers Notch. The result of this growth in the 19th century is a streetscape diverse in 19th-century architecture.

The historic district is roughly centered on the three-way junction of Vermont Route 100 (Main Street to the south and Maple Street to the northeast) and Vermont Route 108 (Mountain Road), which leads to the Stowe Mountain Resort. It extends from Palisades Street in the south to just beyond Cemetery Road in the northeast, and along Mountain Road roughly to where it bends away from the West Branch Little River. It further includes properties on side streets just south of Main Street. The architecture of the village is characterized by wood-frame construction in a diversity of popular 19th-century styles, with a uniformity of setback and scale in many areas. There are some brick houses, and the 1833 Green Mountain Inn is also a prominent example of brick Federal architecture. Civic buildings of note include both the town's 1818 and 1902 town halls (the latter still in use for that purpose).

== See also ==
- National Register of Historic Places listings in Lamoille County, Vermont
