= 1876 Vermont gubernatorial election =

- September 5, 1876
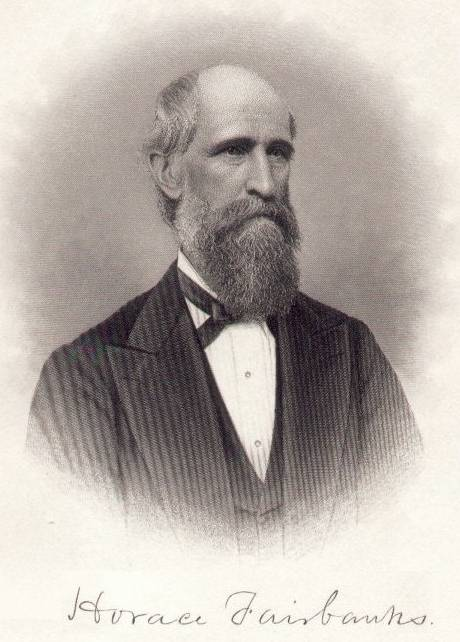

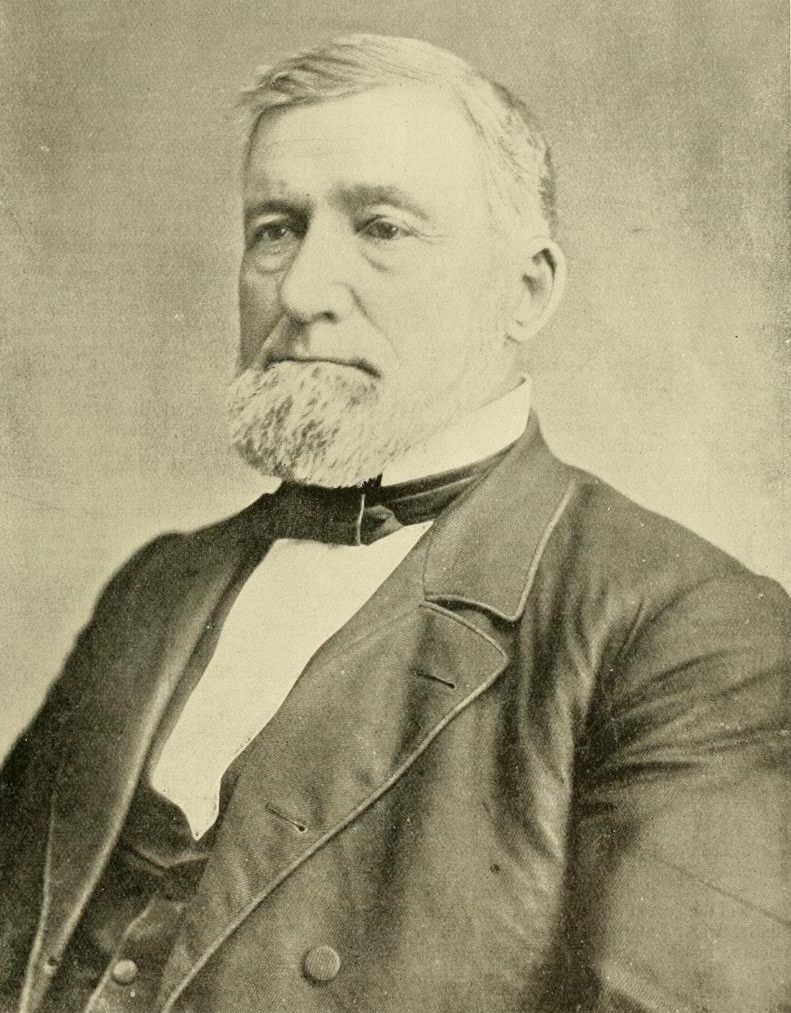
Candidate	Horace Fairbanks	W. H. H. Bingham
Party	Republican	Democratic
Popular vote	44,723	20,988
Percentage	67.99%	31.90%
- County results Fairbanks: 50–60% 60–70% 70–80% 80–90%
Governor before election
Asahel Peck
Republican
Elected Governor
Horace Fairbanks
Republican

The 1876 Vermont gubernatorial election took place on September 5, 1876. Incumbent Republican Asahel Peck, per the "Mountain Rule", did not run for re-election to a second term as Governor of Vermont. Republican candidate Horace Fairbanks defeated Democratic candidate W. H. H. Bingham to succeed him.

== Results ==
1876 Vermont gubernatorial election
Party	Candidate	Votes	%	±%
Republican	Horace Fairbanks	44,723	67.99	−3.7
Democratic	W. H. H. Bingham	20,988	31.90	+3.6
N/A	Other	73	0.11	+0.1
Total votes		65,784	100.0	–
