= 1882 Vermont gubernatorial election =

- September 5, 1882
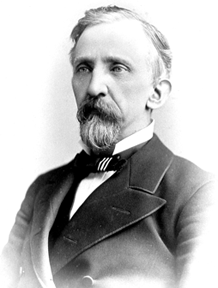

Nominee	John L. Barstow	George E. Eaton
Party	Republican	Democratic
Popular vote	35,839	14,466
Percentage	69.12%	27.90%
- County results Barstow: 50–60% 60–70% 70–80% 80–90%
Governor before election
Roswell Farnham
Republican
Elected Governor
John L. Barstow
Republican

The 1882 Vermont gubernatorial election took place on September 5, 1882. Incumbent Republican Roswell Farnham, per the "Mountain Rule", did not run for re-election to a second term as Governor of Vermont. Republican candidate John L. Barstow defeated Democratic candidate George W. Eaton to succeed him.

== Results ==
1882 Vermont gubernatorial election
Party	Candidate	Votes	%	±%
Republican	John L. Barstow	35,839	69.12	+1.4
Democratic	George E. Eaton	14,466	27.90	−2.2
Greenback	Carlos C. Martin	1,535	2.96	+0.8
N/A	Other	8	0.02	0.0
Total votes		51,848	100.0	–
