= John L. Barstow =

American politician (1832–1913)

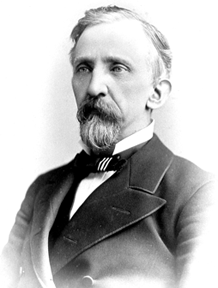

39th Governor of Vermont
- In office October 5, 1882 – October 2, 1884
- Lieutenant: Samuel E. Pingree
- Preceded by: Roswell Farnham
- Succeeded by: Samuel E. Pingree

33rd Lieutenant Governor of Vermont
- In office October 7, 1880 – October 5, 1882
- Governor: Roswell Farnham
- Preceded by: Eben Pomeroy Colton
- Succeeded by: Samuel E. Pingree

Member of the Vermont Senate from Chittenden County
- In office 1866–1868 Serving with Russell S. Taft, Edgar H. Lane (1866); Edgar H. Lane, E. R. Hard (1867)
- Preceded by: Amos Hobart, Anson J. Crane, Russell S. Taft
- Succeeded by: E. R. Hard, E. B. Green, A. B. Halbert

Member of the Vermont House of Representatives from Shelburne
- In office 1864–1866
- Preceded by: Elijah Root
- Succeeded by: Robert J. White

Personal details
- Born: February 21, 1832 Shelburne, Vermont
- Died: June 28, 1913 (aged 81) Shelburne, Vermont
- Party: Republican
- Spouse: Laura Maeck (m. 1858-1885, her death)
- Children: 2
- Parents: Heman Barstow (father); Lorain (Lyon) Barstow (mother)
- Relatives: William A. Barstow (1st cousin, once removed)
- Profession: Farmer; Teacher

Military service
- Allegiance: United States (Union); Vermont
- Branch/service: Union Army; Vermont Militia
- Years of service: 1862–1864 (Army); 1864-1865 (Militia)
- Rank: Major (Army); Brigadier General (Militia)
- Unit: 8th Vermont Infantry (Army); Provisional Forces (Militia)
- Commands: Company K, 8th Vermont Infantry (Army); 1st Brigade, Provisional Forces (Militia)
- Battles/wars: American Civil War: Capture of New Orleans; Siege of Port Hudson; St. Albans Raid

John Lester Barstow (February 21, 1832 – June 28, 1913) was an American teacher, farmer, politician, and soldier who served as the 39th governor of Vermont, United States.

== Early life ==
Barstow was born in Shelburne, Vermont, on February 21, 1832, the son of Heman and Lorain (Lyon) Barstow. After teaching in a local school starting at the age of 15, he moved west to Detroit, where he continued to teach. He returned to Shelburne in 1857 to help his aging parents with their farm. In 1861, he was appointed as assistant clerk of the Vermont House of Representatives.

== Civil War ==
Barstow enlisted as quartermaster sergeant, but was immediately commissioned adjutant of the 8th Vermont Infantry on February 19, 1862. (Note: While serving in Louisiana, the 8th saw sevens German members recruited locally were executed as deserters by the Confederates despite never having served in October 1862. Later, when U.S. forces captured documents left by retreating Rebels at La Fourche Crossing, the regiment found out about their fate. In November, Confederate POWs taken by the Navy at Brashear City were sent to the 8th for safekeeping. The men of the 8th soon learned these men had belonged to some of the units that captured them. Barstow, as adjutant, and his commander, Col. Stephen Thomas interrogated these POWs. These men·confessed to participating and gave the full details of the executions. Barstow and Thomas wrote up a detailed report of their findings on the murders and sent it to Butler. Butler began further investigation to attain justice, but Banks dropped the investigation after taking over the command much to the bitterness of Barstow and the 8th.) He was given command of Company K as a captain on May 27, 1863, then promoted to major and returned to the regimental staff January 22, 1864. He mustered out with the regiment on June 22, 1864. Barstow was held in such esteem by the members of his regiment that he was presented two ceremonial swords, one when he was promoted to major, the other when the regiment was mustered out.

Nearly three years of arduous service in the swamps and humid climate of Louisiana shattered Barstow's health, and for many years malarial diseases deterred him from entering upon any active business pursuits. Soon after the regiment was disbanded, Peter T. Washburn, the adjutant general of the Vermont Militia, offered Barstow a position in the recruiting service, but he was obliged to decline due to his health.

In September 1864, he was elected as a member of the Vermont House, which was in session on October 19, 1864, when the St. Albans raid occurred. Barstow was sent to the scene, later went to Canada on a special mission, and subsequently commanded as a brigadier general one of the militia brigades raised in response. He commanded troops on the northwestern border of the state until relieved by George J. Stannard in January 1865.

== Postwar career ==
In September 1865, Barstow was unanimously reelected to the Vermont House, and served as state senator from Chittenden County in 1866 and 1867. In 1870, President Grant appointed him U.S. pension agent in Burlington, a position he held for eight years. His efforts in reforming the pension system were rewarded with a letter of thanks from the Secretary of the Interior, Carl Schurz.

In 1879, Barstow was appointed by Governor Redfield Proctor to serve as the state commissioner for the centennial celebration of the surrender of Charles Cornwallis at Yorktown, Virginia that ended the American Revolution. In 1880 he was elected lieutenant governor.

== Governor ==
In 1882 Barstow was elected governor, having been nominated with the unanimous vote of the state Republican convention.

He was the first Governor of Vermont to call attention to alleged discriminating and excessive rates of freight by transportation companies, and urged the creation of an effective railroad commission.

Workers at the Ely Copper Mine in Vershire rioted during Barstow's term after having gone months without payment of their wages. Barstow's response included calling out the militia, which arrived to find that claims of violence had been exaggerated. As part of resolving the crisis, Barstow required that the mine owners pay their workers, which earned him favorable publicity nationwide.

The resolution of the Legislature of 1884, requesting the Vermont delegation in Congress to use their best efforts to secure the passage of the interstate commerce law, was passed in pursuance of Governor Barstow's recommendation.

At the close of his administration the Rutland Herald expressed the general opinion of his constituents that "he had been as careful, independent, able and efficient a ruler as Vermont had enjoyed for twenty years."

== Later career ==
In 1891 he was appointed by President Benjamin Harrison to serve on a commission with General Alexander McDowell McCook, U.S. Army, to treat with the Navajo Indians. In 1893 at the request of Governor Levi K. Fuller he was a member of the executive committee of a national antitrust conference.

Barstow was a member of the Reunion Society of Vermont Officers, the Grand Army of the Republic, and the Military Order of the Loyal Legion of the United States. He was an Episcopalian by religious preference, and was a Mason from 1853.

== Retirement and death ==
In retirement, Barstow continued to reside in Shelburne. He died in Shelburne, and is buried at Shelburne Village Cemetery.

== Family ==
On October 28, 1858, Barstow married Laura Maeck (1831–1885) of Shelburne. They were the parents of two sons, Frederick Maeck Barstow (1860–1899) and Charles Lester Barstow (1867–1951). Frederick Barstow graduated from the University of Vermont, worked as a civil engineer, and volunteered for service in the Spanish–American War. He was serving as a first lieutenant with the 3rd U.S. Volunteer Engineer Regiment when he contracted typhoid. His disease was initially thought to be malaria and by the time he was correctly diagnosed and returned to Vermont he was so ill that he died soon afterwards.

Charles Barstow graduated from Union College and worked in the book publishing industry. Over the course of his career he was an author and editor for publishers including Harper & Brothers and The Century Company.

== See also ==
- 8th Vermont Infantry Regiment
- New Orleans in the American Civil War

Party political offices
Preceded by Eben Pomeroy Colton	Republican nominee for Lieutenant Governor of Vermont; 1880	Succeeded by Samuel E. Pingree
Preceded by Roswell Farnham	Republican nominee for Governor of Vermont; 1882	Succeeded by Samuel E. Pingree
Political offices
Preceded by Eben Pomeroy Colton	Lieutenant Governor of Vermont; 1880–1882	Succeeded by Samuel E. Pingree
Preceded by Roswell Farnham	Governor of Vermont; 1882–1884	Succeeded by Samuel E. Pingree
