= Martha Poland Thurston =

American social leader, philanthropist, writer (1849–1898)

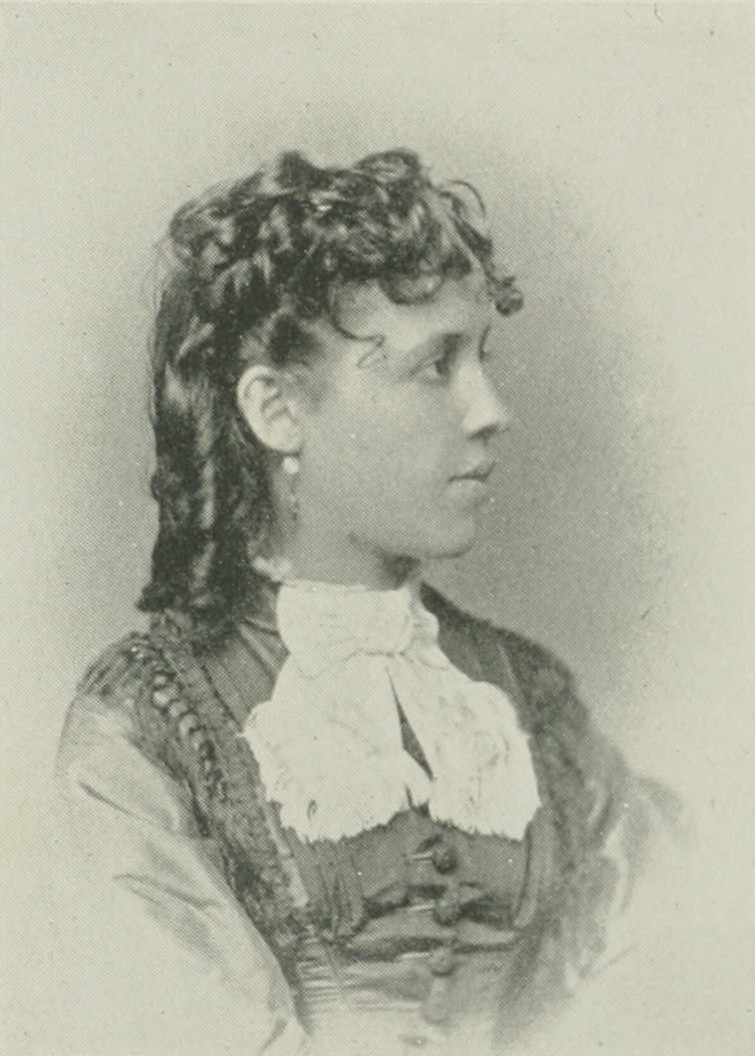
- Photo in A Woman of the Century
- Born: Martha Lydia Poland; May 12, 1849; Morrisville, Vermont, US
- Died: March 14, 1898 (aged 48) on board the yacht Anita, lying off Sagua La Grande, Cuba
- Education: University of Wisconsin
- Occupations: social leader, philanthropist, writer
- Spouse: John Mellen Thurston (m. 1872)
- Children: 6
- Relatives: Luke P. Poland (uncle)

Martha Poland Thurston (née, Poland; May 12, 1849 - March 14, 1898) was a 19th-century American social leader, philanthropist, and writer. She was a great traveler and was also identified with charity. She served as vice-president of the Daughters of the American Revolution (DAR).

== Early life and education ==
Martha Lydia Poland (Note: Her middle name is sometimes given as Lydia, and at other times as Luther.) was born in Morrisville, Vermont, May 12, 1849. Her father, Col. Luther Poland, one of three brothers distinguished for public service and ability, was the son of Deacon Luther Poland, a Vermont pioneer. Her uncle, Luke P. Poland, was a United States Senator and Member of Congress for a number of years, and for nearly a quarter of a century was Chief Justice of the Vermont Supreme Court. The family was among the original and uncompromising abolitionists. Her mother, whose maiden name was Clara M. Bennett, was of New England stock, her ancestors having been among the first settlers of Vermont.

Her parents moved to Viroqua, Wisconsin in 1854 when she was five years old, where she was reared. Her school-life did not commence until she was twelve years of age, and was completed just after her twentieth birthday. During that time, she taught several country and city schools, and showed a marked talent and scholarship. Her essays were characterized by literary ability. In 1867, the family returned to Madison, where Martha completed her education in the University of Wisconsin.

== Career ==
After leaving college, her parents removed to Omaha, Nebraska, where she resided thereafter. On Christmas Day, 1872, she married John Mellen Thurston, then a young attorney, of Omaha. Later, he became the general solicitor of the Union Pacific Railroad system. After her marriage, Thurston devoted herself almost exclusively to her home. A leading Republican and a noted orator, he eventually served as United States Senator from Nebraska. She took a strong interest in politics and contributed much to the political preferment of her husband. She was his constant traveling companion and aided him in his public efforts and addresses. During his campaign for the senatorship, she was present at 74 of the 76 appointments he made. She was his counselor as a lawyer, appearing in court with him as an assistant in several important cases.

Thurston was known as a great traveler. She visited all of the States and Territories in the Union but two, and was familiar with all U.S. cities and points of interest. A contributor to the press, her articles on Alaska and what she saw there having been copied throughout the U.S. She participated in several newspaper controversies on important public questions, always under a pen name, and her authorship was known only to a very few of her most intimate friends. She was the author of a number of literary compositions, publications for private circulation related principally to the writer's views on art.

For many years, she was identified with charity, having attended as a delegate all of the conferences of the National Board of Charities and Corrections since 1885. At the one in Denver, Colorado, July 1892, she held prominent positions on committees and contributed to the success of the convention.

Thurston was a member of the DAR, serving as vice-president of the national body.

== Personal life ==
There were six children from the union including Charles Poland (1874-1880), Frank Mellen (1876-1880), Clarence Luther (b. 1880), Grance Poland (b. 1883), and Jean Mellen (b. 1885). Three sons died young, including Charley and Frankie in 1880. A son, Clarence, and two daughters, Grace and Jean, were educated at home by Mrs. Thurston who personally arranged and supervised their studies, until they entered high school.

On March 14, 1898, she died of heart failure on board the yacht Anita, lying off Sagua La Grande, Cuba after an illness of only a few hours duration. She had been conducting an aid mission to a Cuban concentration camp.

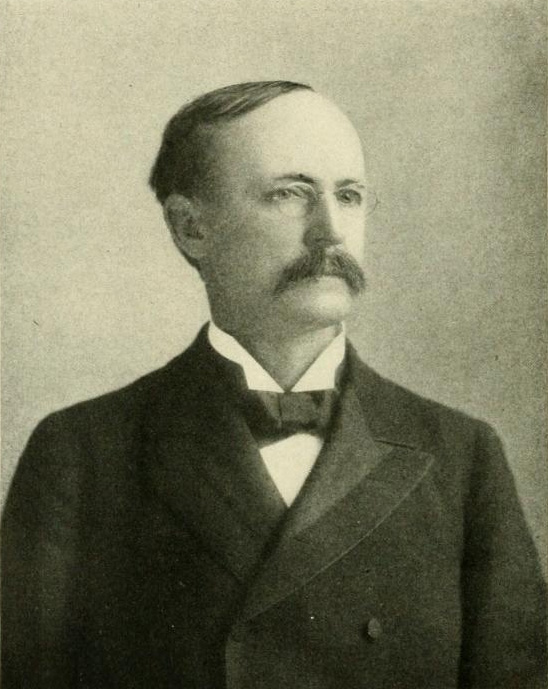
John Mellen Thurston, husband

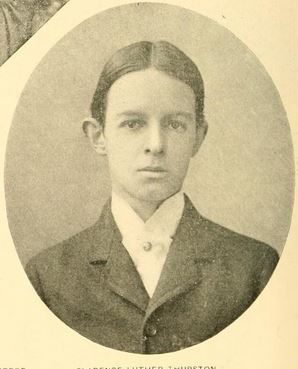
Clarence Luther Thurston, son

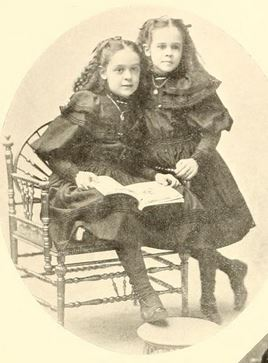
Grace and Jean Thurston, daughters
