= Eben Pomeroy Colton =

American businessman and politician from Vermont

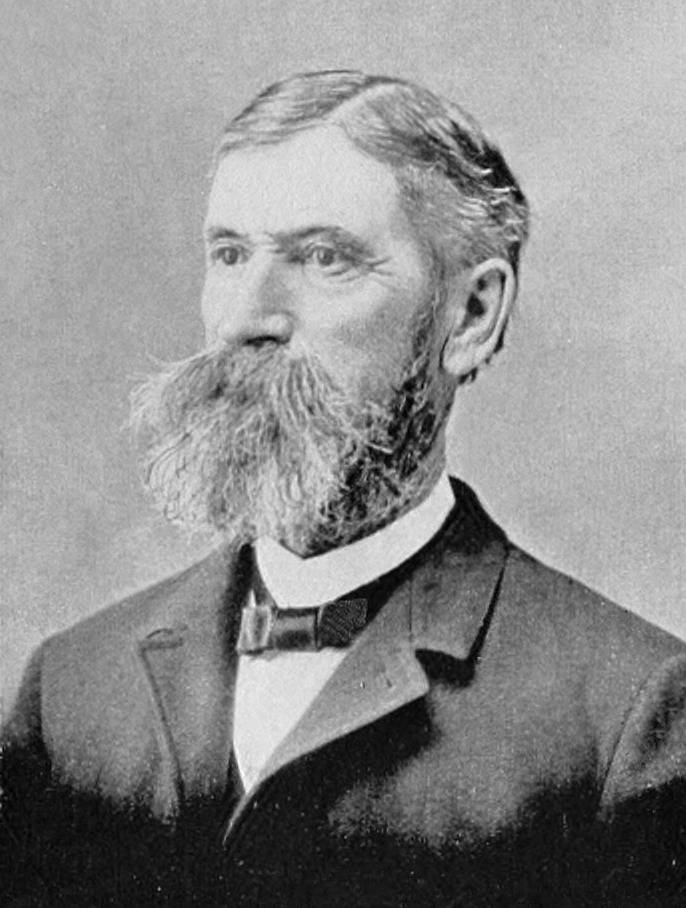
- From 1894's Men of Vermont

Lieutenant Governor of Vermont
- In office 1878–1880
- Governor: Redfield Proctor
- Preceded by: Redfield Proctor
- Succeeded by: John L. Barstow

Member of the Vermont Senate from Orleans County
- In office 1870–1874 Serving with Jerry E. Dickerman (1870), Henderson C. Wilson (1872)
- Preceded by: James W. Simpson, William G. Elkins
- Succeeded by: Henderson C. Wilson, Henry C. Tolman

Member of the Vermont House of Representatives from Irasburg
- In office 1876–1878
- Preceded by: William D. Tyler
- Succeeded by: Laforrest H. Thompson
- In office 1859–1861
- Preceded by: John H. Kellam
- Succeeded by: Isaac N. Cushman

Personal details
- Born: February 11, 1829 West Fairlee, Vermont, US
- Died: September 10, 1895 (aged 66) Irasburg, Vermont, US
- Party: Whig (before 1854); Republican (from 1854)
- Spouse: Almira A. Bailey (m. 1854)
- Children: 4
- Occupation: Businessman

Eben Pomeroy Colton (February 11, 1829 – September 10, 1895) was an American businessman and farmer who served as the 32nd lieutenant governor of Vermont from 1878 to 1880.

== Personal background ==
Born Ebenezer Pomeroy Colton and usually called E. Pomeroy Colton or E. P. Colton, he was born in West Fairlee, Vermont on February 11, 1829, the son of John and Phoebe (Morey) Colton. He moved to Irasburg with his family at age 14, and after completing his education was active in construction, carpentry, farming and lumbering.

== Political background ==
Originally a Whig in politics, Colton became a Republican when that party was founded in the 1850s. He served in the Vermont House of Representatives from 1859 to 1860 and in the Vermont Senate from 1870 to 1874. In 1876, he was again elected to the Vermont House.

In 1878, Colton was elected Lieutenant Governor and served one term, 1878 to 1880.

Active in the Masons and other civic and fraternal organizations, Colton was the first Master of the Vermont Grange, serving from 1872 to 1877.

Colton died in Irasburg on September 10, 1895.

Party political offices
Preceded by Redfield Proctor	Republican nominee for Lieutenant Governor of Vermont; 1878	Succeeded by John L. Barstow
Political offices
Preceded by Redfield Proctor	Lieutenant Governor of Vermont; 1878–1880	Succeeded by John L. Barstow
