= Asahel Peck =

American judge

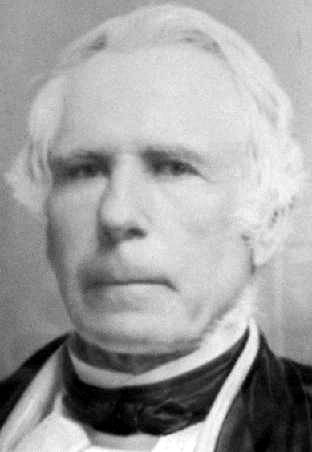

35th Governor of Vermont
- In office October 8, 1874 – October 5, 1876
- Lieutenant: Lyman G. Hinckley
- Preceded by: Julius Converse
- Succeeded by: Horace Fairbanks

Associate Justice of the Vermont Supreme Court
- In office 1861–1874
- Preceded by: Isaac F. Redfield
- Succeeded by: H. Henry Powers

Member of the Vermont Senate from Chittenden County
- In office October 11, 1860 – January 14, 1861 Serving with John H. Woodward, Elmer Beecher
- Preceded by: Lucius E. Chittenden, E. D. Mason, Josiah Tuttle
- Succeeded by: John H. Woodward, Elmer Beecher, George F. Edmunds

Judge of the Vermont Circuit Court
- In office 1851–1857
- Preceded by: None (position created)
- Succeeded by: None (position eliminated)

Personal details
- Born: September 1803 Royalston, Massachusetts
- Died: May 18, 1879 (aged 75) Jericho, Vermont
- Resting place: Hinesburg Village Cemetery, Hinesburg, Vermont
- Party: Democratic (before 1855); Republican
- Education: University of Vermont
- Profession: Attorney; Judge

Asahel Peck (September 1803 – May 18, 1879) was an American lawyer, politician, and judge. He is most notable for his service as an associate justice of the Vermont Supreme Court (1859–1874) and the 35th governor of Vermont from 1874 to 1876.

A native of Royalston, Massachusetts, Peck was raised and educated in Montpelier, Vermont. He attended the University of Vermont, studied law, and attained admission to the bar in 1832. Peck practiced in Burlington, Montpelier, and Jericho, and gained a reputation as a skilled trial attorney.

Initially a Democrat, and later a Republican, Peck served as a Judge of the Vermont Circuit Court from 1851 to 1857. In 1860 he was elected to the Vermont Senate, where he served from October 1860 to January 1861. He resigned to accept appointment an associate justice of the Vermont Supreme Court, and he served until 1874. In 1874, Peck was the successful Republican candidate for governor, and he served two years, 1874 to 1876.

After leaving the governorship, Peck retired to a home in Hinesburg, where he had moved to live closer to members of his family. He died in Jericho in 1879, and was buried at Hinesburg Village Cemetery in Hinesburg.

== Biography ==
Peck was born in Royalston, Massachusetts, in September 1803, the son of Squire Peck and Elizabeth (Goddard) Peck. He moved to Montpelier, Vermont, with his family at the age of three, and was raised on his family's farm. Peck was educated at Hinesburg Academy and Washington County Grammar School, and attended the University of Vermont. He left college in his senior year so he could study in Quebec, and became fluent in French. Afterwards, Peck studied law in Hinesburg with his brother Nahum and at a Montpelier law firm, and attained admission to the bar in 1832. (In 1876 the University of Vermont declared Peck a regular graduate and awarded him his Bachelor of Arts degree.)

== Career ==
A lifelong bachelor, Peck lived in Burlington, Montpelier, and on a farm in Jericho while practicing law. He served as a Circuit Judge from 1851 until 1857, when the Circuit Court system was abolished. He served in the Vermont Senate from 1860 to 1861, and was chairman of the Judiciary Committee. Peck resigned from the state senate to accept appointment as an associate justice of the Vermont Supreme Court, filling the vacancy created when Chief Justice Isaac F. Redfield retired, and Associate Justice Luke P. Poland succeeded him. The other Associate Justices each advanced one step in seniority, with Peck chosen to fill the resulting vacancy.

Originally a Democrat, Peck switched to the Republican Party when it was organized in the mid-1850s as the major anti-slavery party. He resigned from the Supreme Court when he was selected as the Republican nominee for governor in 1874. He was elected over Democrat W. H. H. Bingham, and he served until 1876. As governor, he sought to improve conditions in the state's prisons and supported the establishment of workhouses for minor offenders. During his administration, the office of State Superintendent of Public Instruction was created and a joint resolution was passed favoring the formation of a waterway to connect the St. Lawrence River with the Great Lakes.

After leaving office he returned to his farm and law practice in Jericho, Vermont. He worked until he retired to a home in Hinesburg, where he had moved to be near family members.

== Death and legacy ==
Peck died in Jericho on May 18, 1879. He is interred at Hinesburg Village Cemetery, Hinesburg, Vermont. Governor Peck Road in the towns of Richmond and Jericho is named for him.

In 1872 Middlebury College awarded Peck an honorary Doctor of Laws degree, and in 1874 the University of Vermont awarded Peck an honorary Master of Arts degree.

Party political offices
Preceded by Julius Converse	Republican nominee for Governor of Vermont; 1874	Succeeded by Horace Fairbanks
Political offices
Preceded by Julius Converse	Governor of Vermont; 1874–1876	Succeeded by Horace Fairbanks
