= 1874 Vermont gubernatorial election =

- September 1, 1874
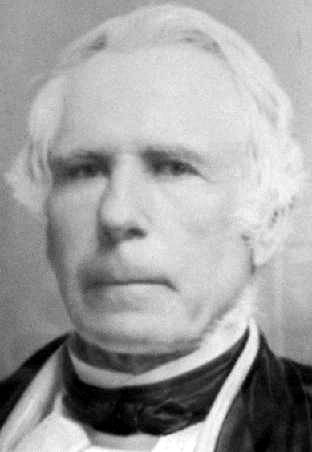

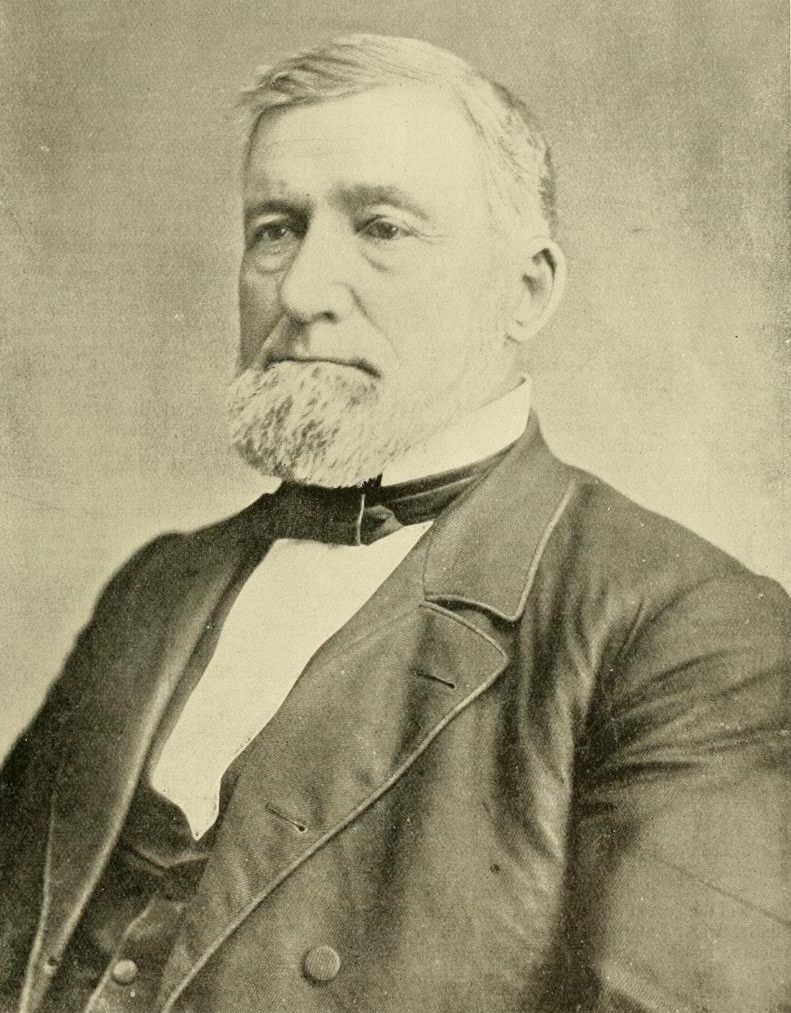
Candidate	Asahel Peck	W. H. H. Bingham
Party	Republican	Democratic
Popular vote	33,582	13,258
Percentage	71.66%	28.29%
- County results Peck: 50–60% 60–70% 70–80% 80–90% >90%
Governor before election
Julius Converse
Republican
Elected Governor
Asahel Peck
Republican

The 1874 Vermont gubernatorial election took place on September 1, 1874. Incumbent Republican Julius Converse, per the "Mountain Rule", did not run for re-election to a second term as Governor of Vermont. Republican candidate Asahel Peck defeated Democratic candidate W. H. H. Bingham to succeed him.

== Results ==
1874 Vermont gubernatorial election
Party	Candidate	Votes	%	±%
Republican	Asahel Peck	33,582	71.66	+0.1
Democratic	W. H. H. Bingham	13,258	28.29	−0.1
N/A	Other	21	0.05	0.0
Total votes		46,861	100.0	–
