= James Manning Tyler =

American judge

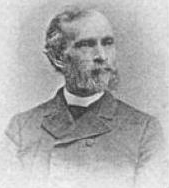

Member of the U.S. House of Representatives from Vermont's 2nd district
- In office March 4, 1879 – March 3, 1883
- Preceded by: Dudley C. Denison
- Succeeded by: Luke P. Poland

Member of the Vermont House of Representatives
- In office 1863–1864

Personal details
- Born: James Manning Tyler; April 27, 1835 Wilmington, Vermont, U.S.
- Died: October 13, 1926 (aged 91) Brattleboro, Vermont, U.S.
- Resting place: Prospect Hill Cemetery
- Party: Republican
- Spouse: Jane Pearson Miles Tyler
- Education: Albany Law School

James Manning Tyler (April 27, 1835 – October 13, 1926) was an American politician, lawyer and judge from Vermont. He served as a U.S. representative from Vermont for two terms from 1879 to 1883.

== Early life and education ==
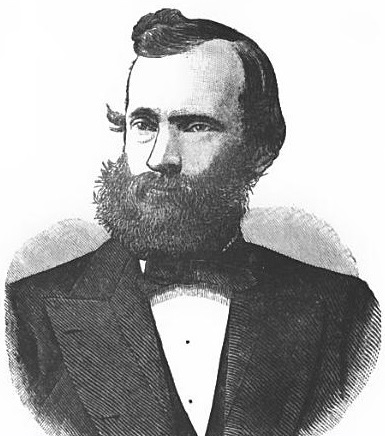
James Manning Tyler, Vermont Congressman and Judge. 1882.

Tyler was born in Wilmington, Vermont, the son of Ephraim Tyler and Mary (Bissell) Tyler. He attended the Brattleboro Academy. He graduated from Albany Law School and was admitted to the bar in September 1860.

== Career ==
After completing his legal studies, Tyler began the practice of law in Wilmington.

He served as member of the Vermont House of Representatives in 1863 and 1864, and as State's attorney in 1866 and 1867. He was a trustee of the Brattleboro Retreat from 1875 until 1926, and a Trustee of the Vermont Asylum for the Insane from 1875 until 1926.

=== Congress ===
Tyler was elected as a Republican candidate to the Forty-sixth and Forty-seventh Congresses, serving from March 4, 1879, until March 3, 1883. He declined to be a candidate for renomination in 1882.

=== After Congress ===
After serving in Congress, he resumed the practice of his profession in Brattleboro, Vermont. Among the prospective attorneys who studied under him was Frank L. Fish, who later served as an associate justice of the Vermont Supreme Court. Tyler was appointed to succeed William H. Walker as a judge on the Vermont Supreme Court in September 1887 and served until his resignation on December 1, 1908. He served as president of the Vermont National Bank from 1917 until 1923, and as president of the Vermont-Peoples' National Bank in 1923 and 1924.

== Personal life ==
Tyler married Jane Pearson Miles on September 1, 1875. They had one child who died in infancy.

Tyler died on October 13, 1926, in Brattleboro, Vermont, and is interred in the Prospect Hill Cemetery in Brattleboro.

U.S. House of Representatives
Preceded by Dudley C. Denison	Member of the U.S. House of Representatives from Vermont's 2nd congressional district 1879-1883	Succeeded by Luke P. Poland
