= Luke P. Poland =

American judge and politician (1815–1887)

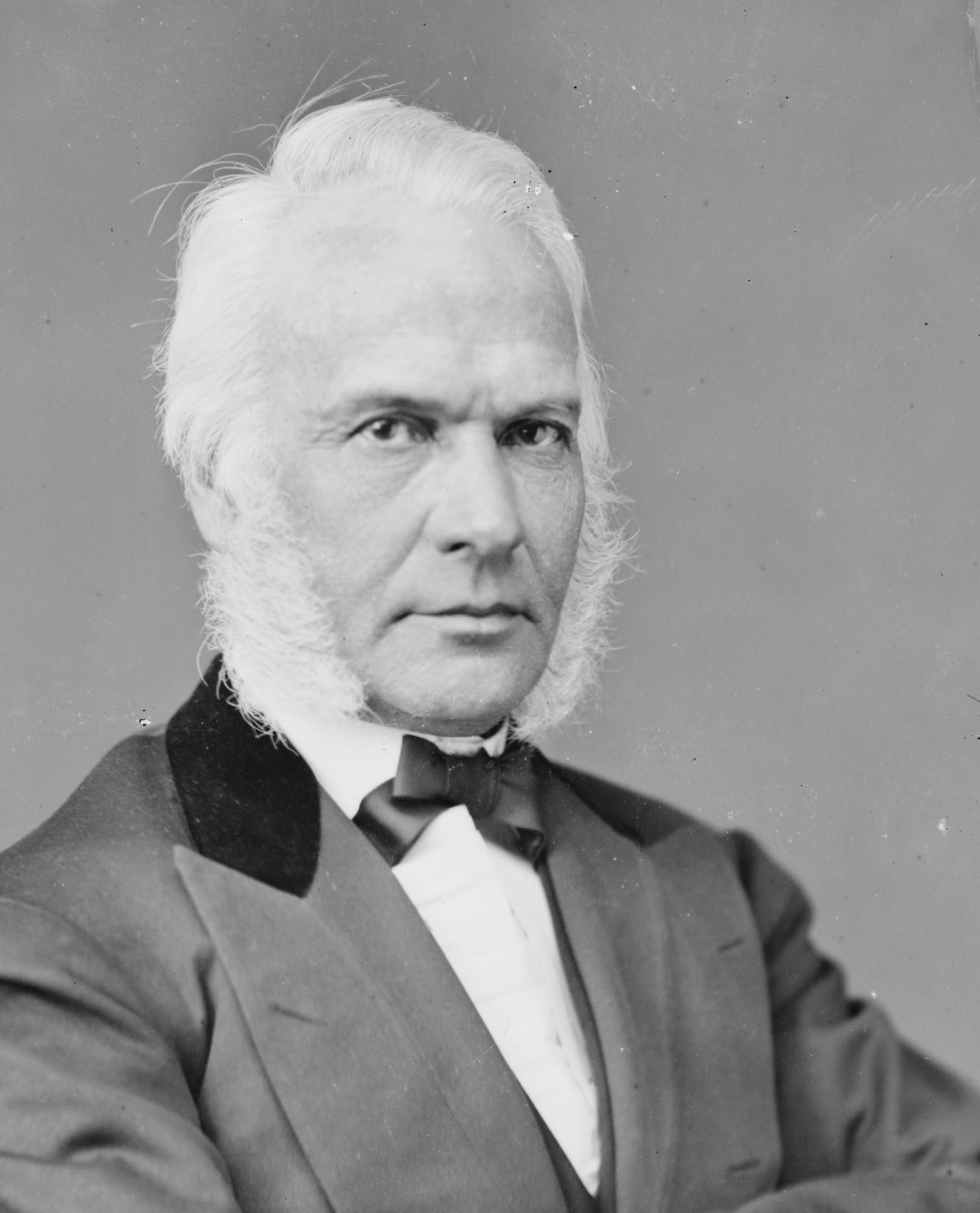
- Poland c. 1865–1875

Member of the United States House of Representatives from Vermont's 2nd district
- In office March 4, 1883 – March 3, 1885
- Preceded by: James M. Tyler
- Succeeded by: William W. Grout
- In office March 4, 1867 – March 3, 1875
- Preceded by: Justin Smith Morrill
- Succeeded by: Dudley C. Denison

United States Senator from Vermont
- In office November 21, 1865 – March 3, 1867
- Preceded by: Jacob Collamer
- Succeeded by: Justin S. Morrill

Member of the Vermont House of Representatives
- In office 1886–1887
- Preceded by: Orpheus T. Taylor
- Succeeded by: Myron E. Church
- Constituency: Waterville
- In office 1878–1880
- Preceded by: Elijah Dickinson Blodgett
- Succeeded by: Walter P. Smith
- Constituency: St. Johnsbury

Chief Justice of the Vermont Supreme Court
- In office 1860–1865
- Preceded by: Isaac F. Redfield
- Succeeded by: John Pierpoint

Associate Justice of the Vermont Supreme Court
- In office 1857–1860
- Preceded by: Pierpoint Isham
- Succeeded by: Asahel Peck
- In office 1849–1850
- Preceded by: Charles Davis
- Succeeded by: None (Size of court reduced)

Personal details
- Born: Luke Potter poland November 1, 1815 Westford, Vermont, US
- Died: July 2, 1887 (aged 71) Waterville, Vermont, US
- Resting place: Mount Pleasant Cemetery, St. Johnsbury, Vermont, US
- Party: Democratic (1836–1848); Free Soil (1848–1854); Republican (from 1854)
- Spouse(s): Martha Smith Poland (m. 1838); Adelia Henrietta Poland (m. 1854)
- Children: 4
- Relatives: Martha L. Poland Thurston (niece)
- Profession: Attorney

Luke Potter Poland (November 1, 1815 – July 2, 1887) was an American attorney, politician, and judge from Vermont. A Republican, he was most notable for his service as a justice of the Vermont Supreme Court (associate justice from 1848 to 1849 and 1857 to 1860, chief justice from 1860 to 1865).

A native of Westford, Vermont, Poland was educated in the local schools and at Jericho Academy. While still in school, he worked in his father's sawmill and as a store clerk in Waterville. He received his qualification as a teacher, then taught school while studying law with an attorney in Morristown. He was admitted to the bar in 1836 and practiced in Morrisville.

Poland was an opponent of slavery and became active in politics as a Democrat, then gravitated to the Free Soil Party and Republican Party as the abolition movement gained increasing prominence in the 1840s and 1850s. He served in county offices including register of probate and state's attorney before being appointed an associate justice of the Vermont Supreme Court, an office he held from 1848 to 1849 and 1857 to 1860. From 1860 to 1865, he served as the court's chief justice.

In October 1865, Poland was appointed to temporarily succeed Jacob Collamer in the United States Senate, and he served from November 21, 1865, to March 3, 1867. In 1866, he was elected to the United States House of Representatives, and he served three terms, from March 4, 1867, to March 3, 1875. In 1882, he was again elected to the U.S. House and served one term, from March 4, 1883, to March 3, 1885.

Poland died at his summer home in Waterville, Vermont on July 2, 1887 aged 71 and was buried in St. Johnsbury.

== Early life ==
Poland was born in Westford, Vermont son of Luther and Nancy Potter Poland. His father was a carpenter, farmer, and sawmill owner who also represented Waterville, Vermont in the Vermont House of Representatives. Poland attended the common schools of Waterville and the Jericho Academy, then was employed as a clerk in a Waterville store, worked in his father's sawmill, and taught in the public schools of Morrisville, Vermont. He studied law in the Morristown, Vermont office of attorney Samuel A. Willard and was admitted to the bar in December 1836.

Poland was also active in politics as an opponent of slavery, initially as a Democrat, and in 1848 was the party's unsuccessful nominee for lieutenant governor. He later became a member of the Free Soil Party. He became a Republican when the party was founded in the mid-1850s and maintained that affiliation for the rest of his life.

== Career ==
He practiced in Morrisville. Poland was registrar of probate from 1839 to 1840 and was a member of the State constitutional convention of 1843. In 1844 he succeeded W. H. H. Bingham as state's attorney of Lamoille County, and he was reelected in 1845. In 1848 he succeeded Charles Davis as an associate justice of the Vermont Supreme Court, a position in which he served until 1849. In 1850, Poland moved to St. Johnsbury, Vermont. From 1850 to 1857, he served as a judge of the Vermont Circuit Court. He served as an associate justice again from 1857 to 1860, succeeding Pierpoint Isham. In 1860, he succeeded Isaac F. Redfield as chief justice; he served until 1865, and was succeeded by John Pierpoint.

On October 24, 1865, Poland was elected to the U.S. Senate to fill the vacancy caused by the death of Jacob Collamer, and he served from November 21, 1865, to March 3, 1867. He was then elected to the House of Representatives for the 40th and the three succeeding Congresses, serving from March 4, 1867, to March 3, 1875. While in the U.S. House, he was chairman of the Committee on Revisal and Unfinished Business (40th Congress) and a member of the Committee on Revision of the Laws (40th, 41st, and 43rd Congresses). He was an unsuccessful candidate for reelection to the 44th Congress in 1874.

In 1874, Poland served as chair of the "Poland Committee", tasked with reporting on the "Condition of Affairs in the State of Arkansas" after the Brooks-Baxter War.

After leaving the House, Poland continued to practice law in St. Johnsbury. In 1878, he was elected to a term in the Vermont House of Representatives, where he was appointed chairman of the Judiciary Committee. Poland was also a trustee of the University of Vermont and president of the First National Bank of St. Johnsbury.

In 1882, Poland was again elected to the U.S. House. He served one term (48th Congress, March 4, 1883 to March 3, 1885). He was not a candidate for renomination in 1884 and resumed practicing law in St. Johnsbury.

== Death and burial ==
In retirement, Poland resided in Waterville, where he had purchased and renovated his father-in-law's home. In 1886, he was elected to represent Waterville in the Vermont House and was again selected to chair the Judiciary Committee. He died in Waterville on July 2, 1887. Poland was buried at Mount Pleasant Cemetery in St. Johnsbury.

== Awards ==
In 1858, the University of Vermont (UVM) awarded Poland the honorary degree of Master of Arts. In 1861, UVM awarded him an honorary LL.D.

== Family ==
In 1838, Poland married Martha Smith Page and they had three children. Martha died in 1853 and he married her sister, Adelia Henrietta. With his first wife, Poland's children included: Susan E. (1840–1841); Martin Luther (1841–1878), a West Point graduate and captain in the United States Army who died while on duty at Fort Yuma on the California-Arizona border; Mary Frances (1843–1865); and Isabel Emma (1848–1927), the wife of first Andrew E. Rankin, and then Henry O. Cushman.

== See also ==
- Poland Act

Party political offices
| Preceded by Jacob Scott | Free Soil nominee for Lieutenant Governor of Vermont; 1848 | Succeeded by Daniel Roberts, Jr. |
U.S. Senate
| Preceded by Jacob Collamer | U.S. senator (Class 3) from Vermont; November 21, 1865 – March 3, 1867; Served alongside: Solomon Foot and George F. Edmunds | Succeeded by Justin S. Morrill |
U.S. House of Representatives
| Preceded by Justin S. Morrill | Member of the U.S. House of Representatives from Vermont's 2nd congressional district March 4, 1867 – March 3, 1875 | Succeeded by Dudley C. Denison |
| Preceded by James M. Tyler | Member of the U.S. House of Representatives from Vermont's 2nd congressional district March 4, 1883 – March 3, 1885 | Succeeded by William W. Grout |
