= Dudley Chase Denison =

American politician (1819–1905)

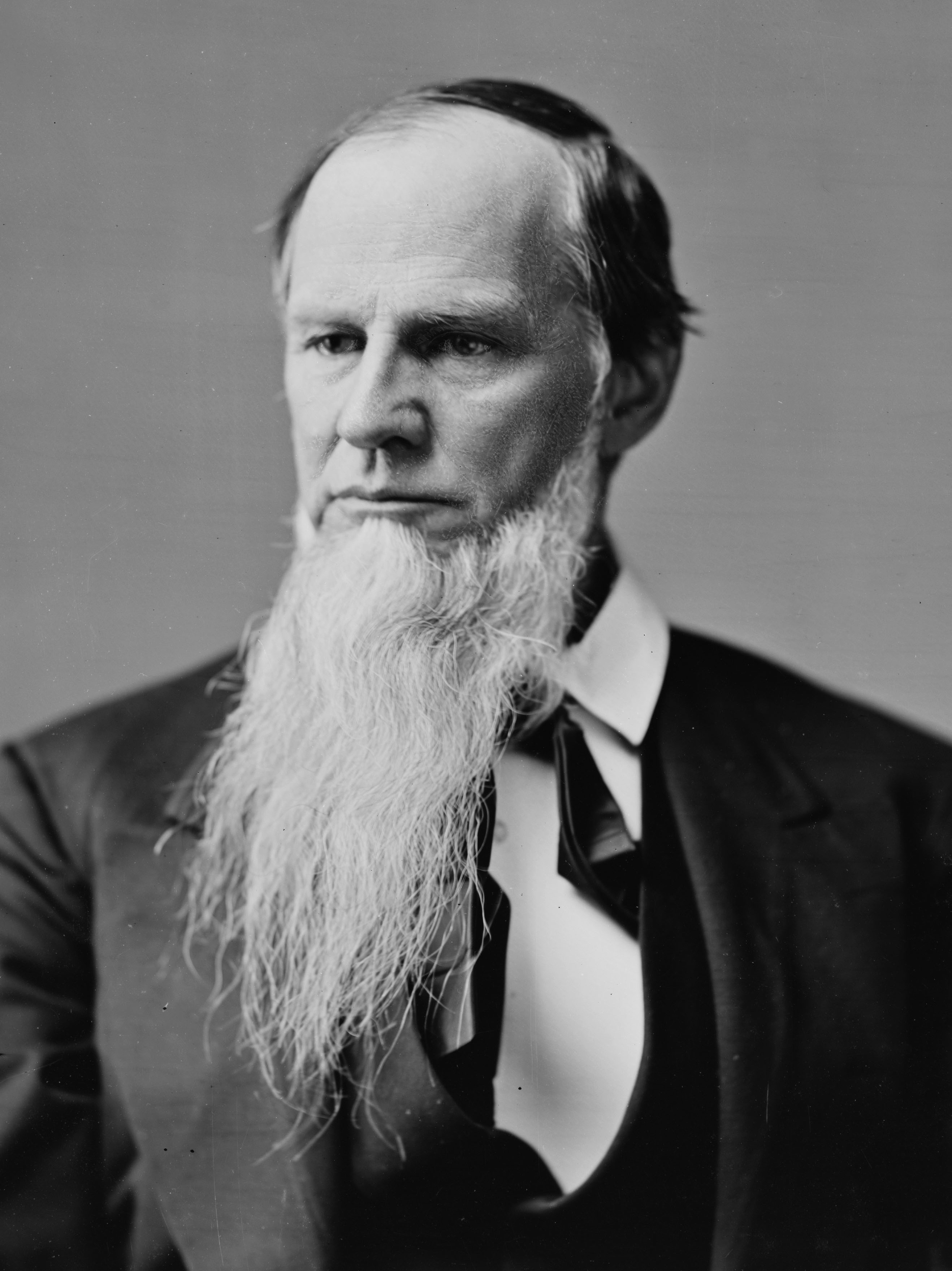
- Denison, 1865–1880

Member of the U.S. House of Representatives from Vermont's 2nd district
- In office March 4, 1875 – March 3, 1879
- Preceded by: Luke P. Poland
- Succeeded by: James Manning Tyler

United States Attorney for the District of Vermont
- In office 1864–1869
- President: Abraham Lincoln; Andrew Johnson
- Preceded by: George Howe
- Succeeded by: Benjamin F. Fifield

Member of the Vermont House of Representatives from Royalton
- In office 1860–1864
- Preceded by: Minot Wheeler
- Succeeded by: John S. Marcy

Member of the Vermont Senate from Windsor County
- In office 1853–1854 Serving with Carlos Coolidge, Benoni Buck, Thomas B. Harvey
- Preceded by: Crosby Miller, Asa B. Foster, Thomas B. Harvey, Benoni Buck
- Succeeded by: Carlos Coolidge, Norman Williams, Shubael Converse, George Johnson

Personal details
- Born: Dudley Chase Denison; September 13, 1819 Royalton, Vermont, US
- Died: February 10, 1905 (aged 85) Royalton, Vermont, US
- Resting place: North Royalton cemetery
- Party: Independent Republican and Republican
- Spouse: Eunice Dunbar Denison
- Relations: Dudley Chase (Uncle); Philander Chase (Uncle); Salmon P. Chase (Cousin)
- Children: 7
- Education: University of Vermont
- Profession: Attorney

Dudley Chase Denison (September 13, 1819 – February 10, 1905) was a politician and lawyer from Vermont. He served as a member of the United States House of Representatives for two terms from 1875 to 1879 and was also a member of the Vermont House of Representatives (1860 to 1864) and Vermont State Senate (1853 to 1854).

== Early life and career ==
Denison was born in Royalton, Vermont, son of Dr. Joseph Adam Denison and Rachel (Chase) Denison. He attended Royalton Academy and graduated third in his class from the University of Vermont in 1840. He later received a Master of Arts degree from the University of Vermont. He studied law and was admitted to the bar in 1845. He began the practice of law in Royalton.

== Political career ==
Denison served as a member of the Vermont State Senate in 1853 and 1854 and served as the State's Attorney for Windsor County from 1858 until 1860. He was a member of the Vermont House of Representatives from 1860 until 1864. He was a trustee for Norwich University from 1850 until 1887, and a trustee for the University of Vermont from 1862 to 1865.

From 1864 to 1869, Denison served as the United States Attorney for the District of Vermont. He also served as a director of the National Life Insurance Company.

=== Congress ===
He was elected as an Independent Republican candidate to the 44th United States Congress and reelected as a Republican candidate to the 45th United States Congress, serving from March 4, 1875, until March 3, 1879. He was not a candidate for reelection in 1878.

== Later career and death ==
After serving in Congress, Denison resumed the practice of law in Royalton. He died in Royalton on February 10, 1905, and is interred in the North Royalton cemetery.

== Personal life ==
Denison married Eunice Dunbar on December 22, 1846. They had seven children.

He was the nephew of Dudley Chase and Philander Chase, and the cousin of Salmon P. Chase.

== See also ==
- Chase family

U.S. House of Representatives
Preceded by Luke P. Poland	Member of the U.S. House of Representatives from Vermont's 2nd congressional district 1875-1879	Succeeded by James M. Tyler
