= Proctor-Clement House =

Historic house in Vermont, United States

- U.S. National Register of Historic Places
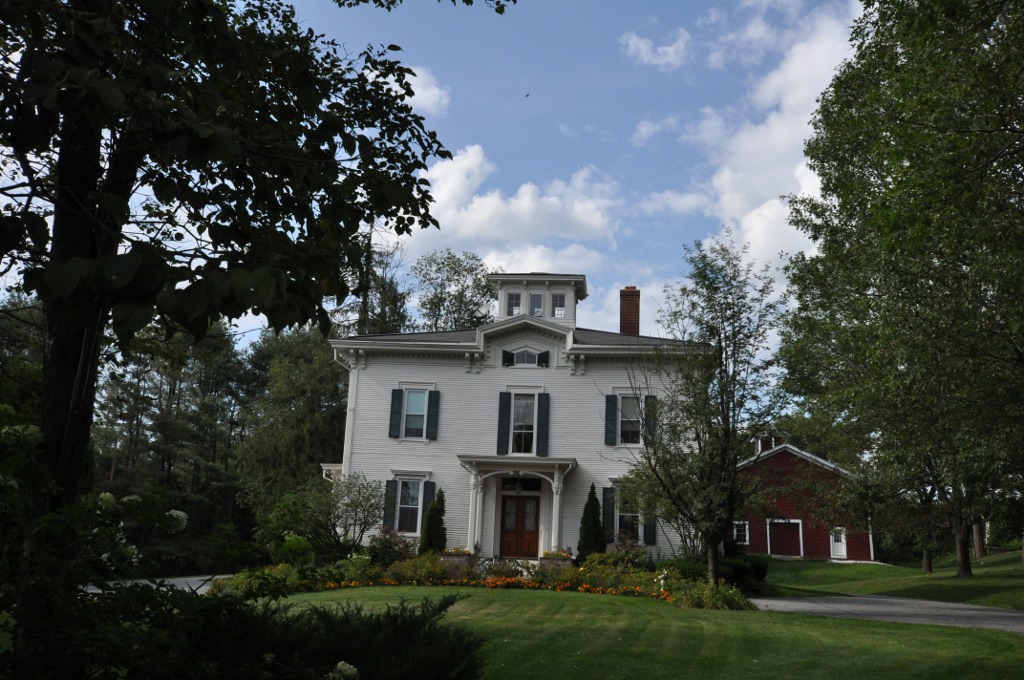

- Location within Vermont Location within the United States
- Location: 85 Field Ave., Rutland, Vermont
- Coordinates: 43°37′36″N 72°59′11″W
- Area: 1.5 acres (0.61 ha)
- Built: 1867
- Architectural style: Italianate
- NRHP reference No.: 82001705
- Added to NRHP: June 17, 1982

The Proctor-Clement House is a historic house at 85 Field Avenue in Rutland, Vermont. It was built in 1867 for Redfield Proctor, a prominent local lawyer and businessman who came to own the Vermont Marble Company and served as Governor of Vermont. A fine example of Italianate architecture, it now houses the Antique Mansion Bed and Breakfast. It was listed on the National Register of Historic Places in 1982.

== Description and history ==
The Proctor-Clement House is located in a residential area near the northern city limit of Rutland, opposite the Rutland Country Club at the junction of Field Avenue and Grove Street. It is a roughly square two-story wood-frame structure, with clapboard siding and a shallow hip roof topped by a square belvedere. The building corners are pilastered, and the eaves are studded with paired Italianate brackets. The main entrance is sheltered by a shallow portico with bracketed chamfered posts. The interior has a central hall plan, with a combination of Italianate and Colonial Revival features, dating either to the period of construction or an early 20th-century renovation. The dining room walls have been painted with a series of murals that probably date to the 1920s.

The house was built in 1867 by Redfield Proctor, then a well-off lawyer and businessman, in what was then a fashionable residential area on the city's outskirts. In 1871 Proctor moved to Sutherland Falls, where he had become involved the Sutherland Falls Marble Company. Proctor was instrumental in the establishment by merger of the Vermont Marble Company, and it was through his efforts that Sutherland Falls was set off from Rutland as the town of Proctor, and that West Rutland, another major marble quarry area, was also separated from the city. Proctor served as Governor of Vermont (as did two of his sons), and as United States Secretary of War under President Benjamin Harrison.

The house remained in Proctor's ownership until his death in 1909, and was then owned by the locally prominent Clement family.

== See also ==
- National Register of Historic Places listings in Rutland County, Vermont
