= Green Mountain Inn =

Historic inn in Vermont, United States

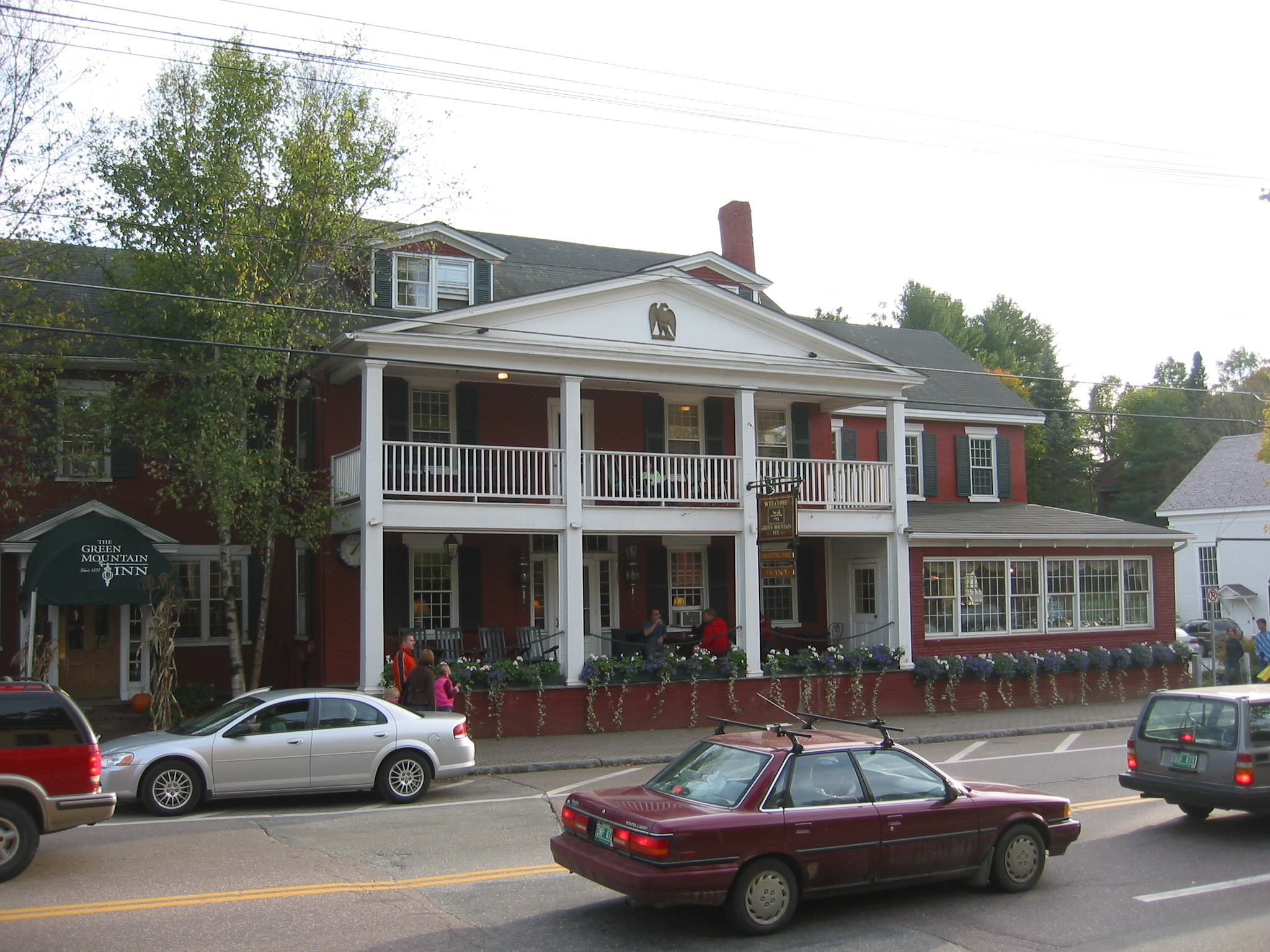
- The inn in 2005. The two-story porch is now enclosed
- Interactive map of the Green Mountain Inn area

General information
- Location: 18 Main Street; Stowe, Vermont 05672
- Coordinates: 44.4653°N 72.6871°W
- Opening: 1833 (193 years ago)
- Owner: Gameroff Trust

Technical details
- Floor count: 2 (in main inn)

Other information
- Number of rooms: 104 (across eight buildings)
- Number of restaurants: 1
- Number of bars: 1
- Parking: yes

Website
- greenmountaininn.com
- Green Mountain Inn
- U.S. Historic district – Contributing property
- Part of: Stowe Village Historic District (ID78000236)
- Designated CP: November 15, 1978

The Green Mountain Inn is located on Main Street (Vermont Route 100) in Stowe, Vermont, United States. Built in 1833, it stands near the intersection of Route 100 and Mountain Road (Route 108). The main inn building, the former Depot buildings and Sanborn House are listed on the National Register of Historic Places as part of the Stowe Village Historic District.

The inn has 104 rooms in its eight buildings, up from 64 rooms in 1994 and 76 rooms in 1998.

It contains the Whip Bar & Grill restaurant, which features beams from a large stable that formerly stood on the site of the inn's annex wing and which was torn down in 1953 due to its being a fire risk.

== History ==
The building's construction was completed in 1833 by Peter C. Lovejoy (1783–1874). He later exchanged it with Stillman Churchill for a farm of 350 acres (140 ha). Churchill added wings, made of brick, a dance hall and a two-story front porch. He named it Mansfield House. Churchill later forfeited ownership in a foreclosure to mortgage holder W. H. H. Bingham.

Mansfield House was run as a hotel. After it was sold to W. P. Bailey, it became known as the Brick Hotel. It received its current name in 1893, when it was bought by Mark C. Lovejoy (1862–1937).

The Depot Street building was added in 1897, becoming the home of the Mount Mansfield Electric Railroad. Depot Street passes between the inn and the Depot building today. Sanborn House was purchased, and it became a blacksmith and livery.

Chester A. Arthur, 21st U.S. president, once performed in a theatrical production at the inn. Another president, Gerald Ford, visited as part of a Look magazine feature on the town. He posed for photographs in various locations.

Marvin Gameroff, a Canadian who visited the town and fell in love with it, purchased the inn in 1982. It was later transferred to the Gameroff Trust, which still owns the inn.

Beginning in 1983, the building's 150th anniversary, a major renovation project was begun to restore the main inn and Depot Building.

== Depot Street building ==
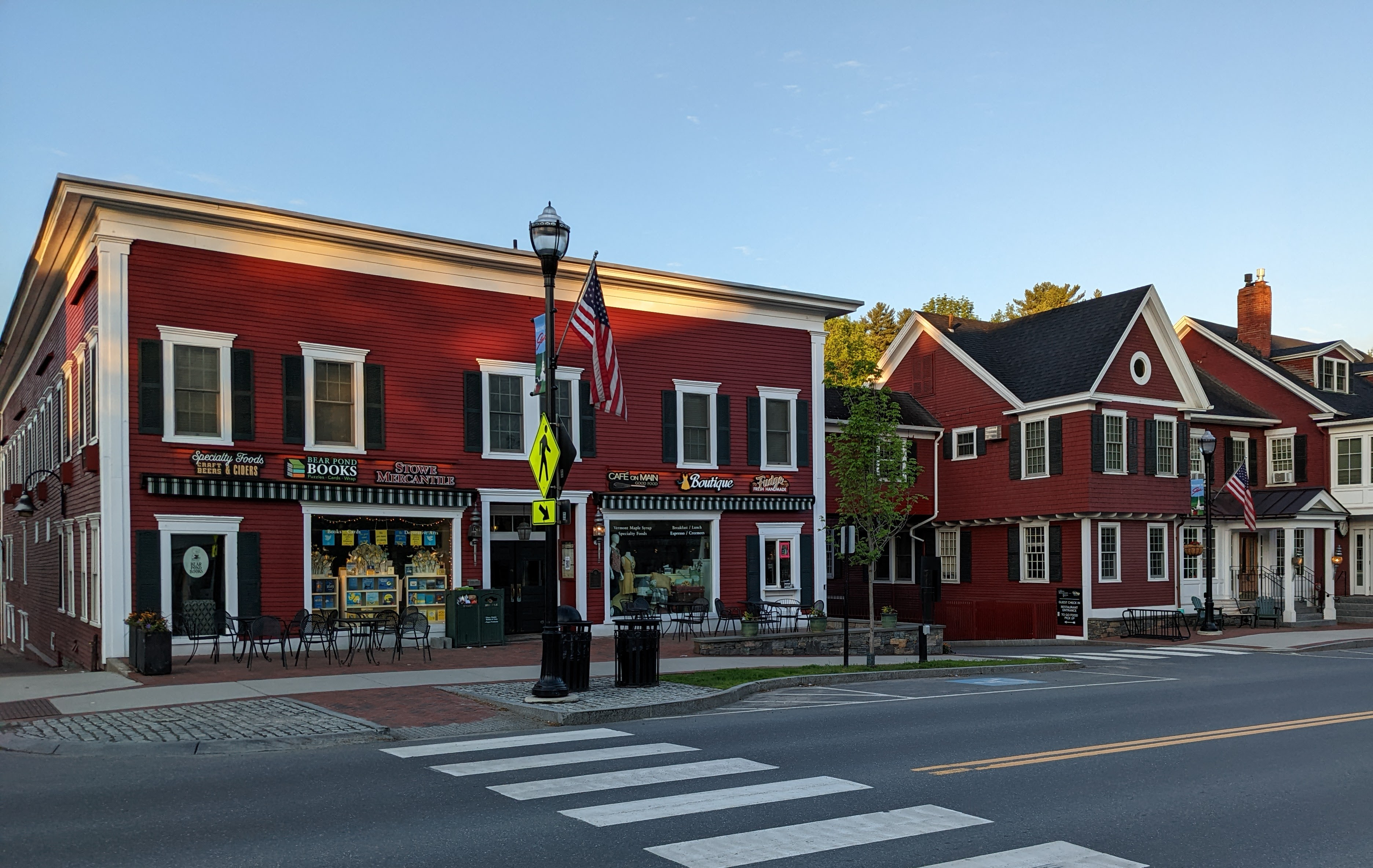
The Depot Street building is on the left; the main inn's western section is on the right

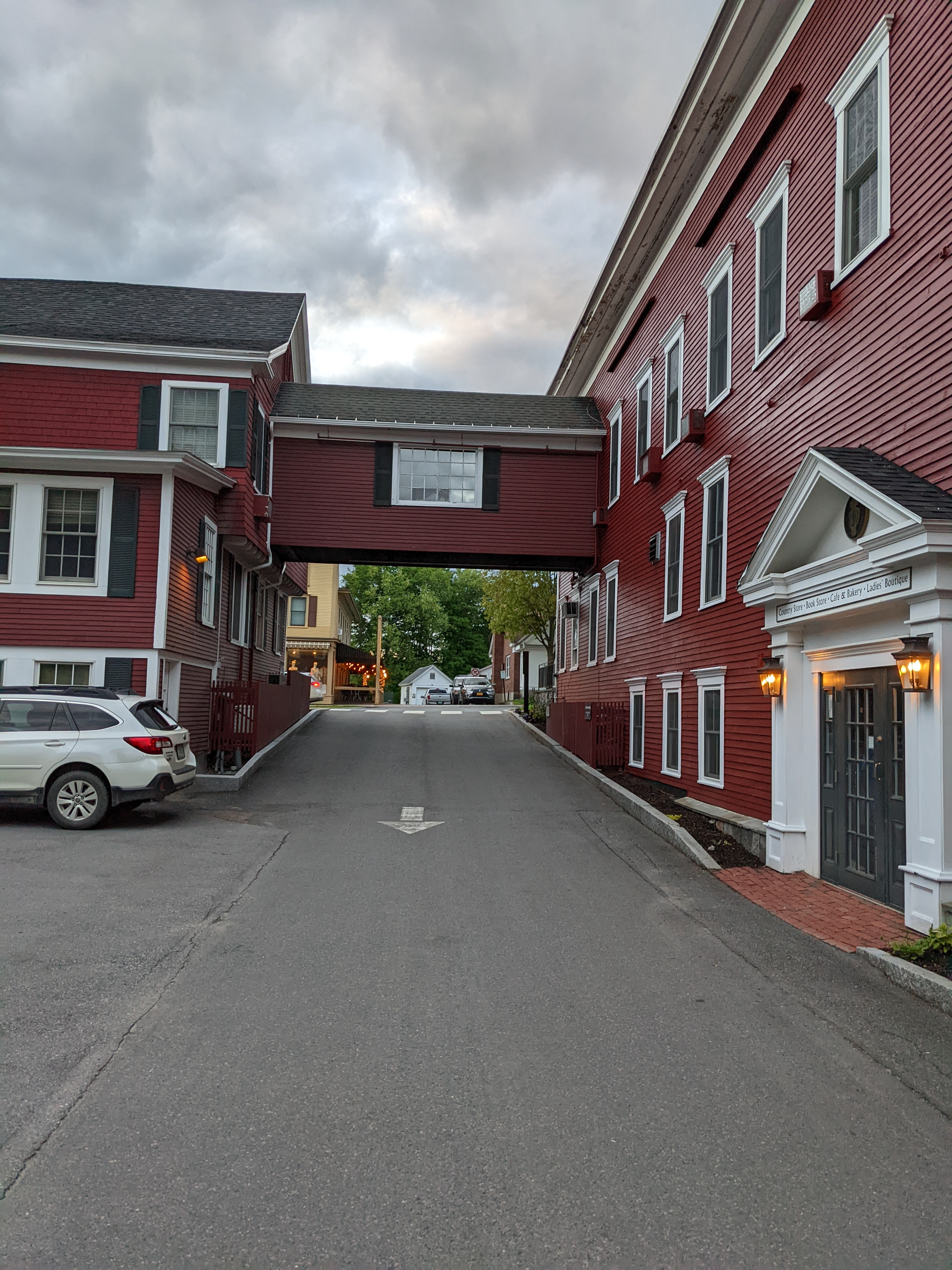
The bridge connecting the main inn (left) to the Depot Street building, looking back to Main Street from the inn's parking lot
