= Roswell Farnham =

Governor of Vermont (1880–1882)

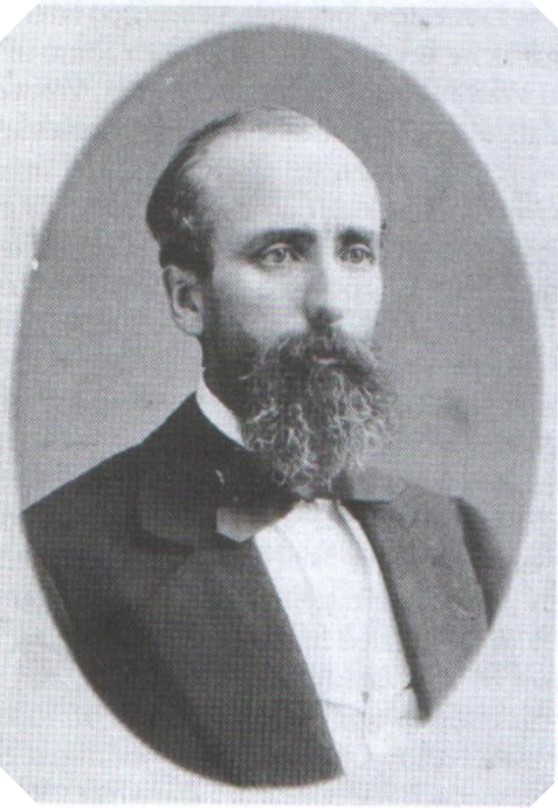

38th Governor of Vermont
- In office October 7, 1880 – October 5, 1882
- Lieutenant: John L. Barstow
- Preceded by: Redfield Proctor
- Succeeded by: John L. Barstow

Member of the Vermont Senate from Orange County
- In office 1868–1870 Serving with James Hutchinson Jr.
- Preceded by: Burnham Martin; Hiram Barrett
- Succeeded by: Heman A. White; Harry H. Niles

State's Attorney of Orange County, Vermont
- In office 1859–1862
- Preceded by: Charles C. Dewey
- Succeeded by: John W. Rowell

Personal details
- Born: July 23, 1827 Boston, Massachusetts
- Died: January 5, 1903 (aged 75) Bradford, Vermont
- Resting place: Bradford Town Cemetery
- Party: Republican
- Spouse: Mary Elizabeth Johnson
- Education: University of Vermont
- Profession: Attorney

Military service
- Allegiance: United States (Union)
- Branch/service: Union Army
- Years of service: 1861-1863
- Rank: Lieutenant Colonel
- Unit: 1st Vermont Infantry; 12th Vermont Infantry
- Battles/wars: American Civil War

Roswell Farnham (July 23, 1827 – January 5, 1903) was an American politician of the Republican Party, an officer in the Union Army during the American Civil War, a lawyer, and the 38th governor of Vermont.

== Biography ==
Farnham was born in Boston, Massachusetts, son of Roswell and Nancy Bixby Farnham. His father was in business and moved to Haverhill, Massachusetts, where he began manufacturing boots and shoes until 1839. The financial downturn ruined him. In 1840 Roswell moved with his father and family to a farm on the Connecticut River in Bradford.

Farnham entered the junior class University of Vermont, where he was a member of the Lambda Iota Society: graduated in 1849, and earned a degree of A. M. in 1852. On December 25, 1849, he married Mary Elizabeth Johnson of Bradford. The couple had three children, Charles Cyrus, Florence Mary, and William Mills.

== Career ==
Farnham taught school at Dunham, Lower Canada; was principal of Franklin Academical Institution, Franklin, Vermont; later taught at the Bradford Academy. He studied law during that time and was admitted to the Orange County Bar 1857. He formed partnership with Robert McK. Ormsby until 1859 when he began practicing independently. He was elected states attorney 1859, and twice re-elected.

During the early part of the Civil War, Farnham was a second lieutenant in the Bradford Guards, a company in the 1st Vermont Infantry. Later, he was a captain and then the lieutenant colonel of the 12th Vermont Infantry, and for nearly half the term of his nine months of service was in command of the regiment.

After the war, Farnham resumed practice of law at Bradford, and was Republican candidate for representative in the Legislature, but was defeated. He was elected to the Vermont State Senate from Orange County in 1868 and 1869. He was a delegate to the Republican national convention and presidential elector 1876.

Farnham was elected Governor of Vermont in 1880 by a majority of over 26,000, at that time the third-largest majority ever recorded in the state of Vermont. During his tenure, he focused on school and prison reform. He also sought ways to encourage manufacturing businesses to relocate to Vermont.

== Death ==
He died in Bradford and is interred at Bradford Town Cemetery, Bradford, Vermont.

Party political offices
Preceded by Redfield Proctor	Republican nominee for Governor of Vermont; 1880	Succeeded by John L. Barstow
Political offices
Preceded by Redfield Proctor	Governor of Vermont; 1880–1882	Succeeded by John L. Barstow
