= Isaac F. Redfield =

American lawyer, judge, and legal scholar (1804–1876)

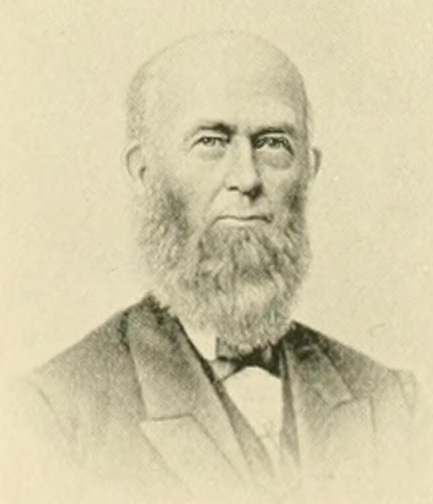
- From 1894's Men of Vermont Illustrated

Chief Justice of the Vermont Supreme Court
- In office 1852–1859
- Preceded by: Stephen Royce
- Succeeded by: Luke P. Poland

Associate Justice of the Vermont Supreme Court
- In office 1836–1852
- Preceded by: John Mattocks
- Succeeded by: Milo Lyman Bennett

State's Attorney of Orleans County, Vermont
- In office 1832–1835
- Preceded by: George C. West
- Succeeded by: Elisha H. Starkweather

Personal details
- Born: April 10, 1804 Weathersfield, Vermont
- Died: March 23, 1876 (aged 71) Charlestown, Massachusetts
- Resting place: Old South Church Cemetery, Windsor, Vermont
- Party: Democratic
- Spouse(s): Mary Ward Smith (m. 1836-1839, her death); Catherine Blanchard Clark (m. 1842-1876, his death)
- Relations: Timothy P. Redfield (brother); Redfield Proctor (cousin)
- Children: 7
- Education: Dartmouth College
- Profession: Attorney
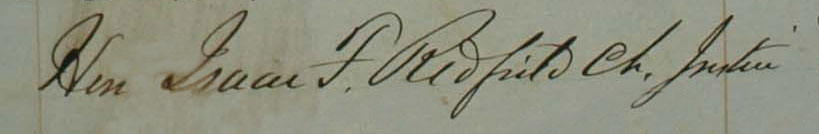
- Signature

Isaac Fletcher Redfield (April 10, 1804 – March 23, 1876) was an American lawyer, judge, and legal scholar. He was most notable for his service as an associate justice of the Vermont Supreme Court from 1836 to 1852 and chief justice from 1852 to 1859.

A native of Weathersfield, Vermont, Redfield was raised and educated in Coventry and graduated from Dartmouth College in 1825. He studied law, attained admission to the bar in 1827, and began to practice in Derby. A Democrat in politics, in 1832 he was elected State's Attorney of Orleans County. He served until 1835, when he resigned to become a judge.

In 1835, Redfield was chosen to serve as an associate justice of the Vermont Supreme Court. He served until 1852, when he was appointed the court's chief justice. Redfield served until 1859, when he declined reappointment. From 1857 to 1861, Redfield was a professor at Dartmouth College. In 1861, he moved to Boston in order to further his scholarly and written work. In addition to serving as an editor of the American Law Register beginning in 1861, he authored numerous books and journal articles, particularly on medical jurisprudence and railroad law.

Redfield died at his home in Charlestown, Massachusetts on March 23, 1876. He was buried at Old South Church Cemetery in Windsor, Vermont.

== Early life ==
Redfield was born in Wethersfield, Vermont on April 10, 1804, the oldest of twelve children born to Dr. Peleg Redfield and Hannah (Parker) Sunderland. In 1806, the family moved to Coventry, then a frontier region of northern Vermont. In addition to practicing medicine, Peleg Redfield farmed and served in local offices including selectman, town clerk, town treasurer, and member of the Vermont House of Representatives.

After the move to Coventry, Redfield was educated in the local schools. He then began attendance at Dartmouth College, teaching schools and producing and selling maple sugar to pay his tuition. He graduated in 1825, then studied law with a local attorney. Redfield was admitted to the bar in 1827, then began a practice in Derby.

== Start of career ==
During the early years of his practice, Redfield developed expertise in special pleading, and as a result was frequently retained by other attorneys to draft their written pleas and motions. He was affiliated with the Democratic Party, and in 1832 he was elected State's Attorney of Orleans County.

In 1835, the Vermont General Assembly elected Redfield as an associate justice of the Vermont Supreme Court, succeeding John Mattocks. He was reelected annually until 1852, when he was promoted to chief justice, and was succeeded by Milo Lyman Bennett. He succeeded Stephen Royce as chief justice, and served until 1859, when he declined to be considered for another term. He was succeeded by Luke P. Poland.

After becoming a judge, Redfield resided in Montpelier, Randolph Center, and Windsor. While residing in Randolph Center, he resided in the home that had once been owned by Dudley Chase.

== Continued career ==
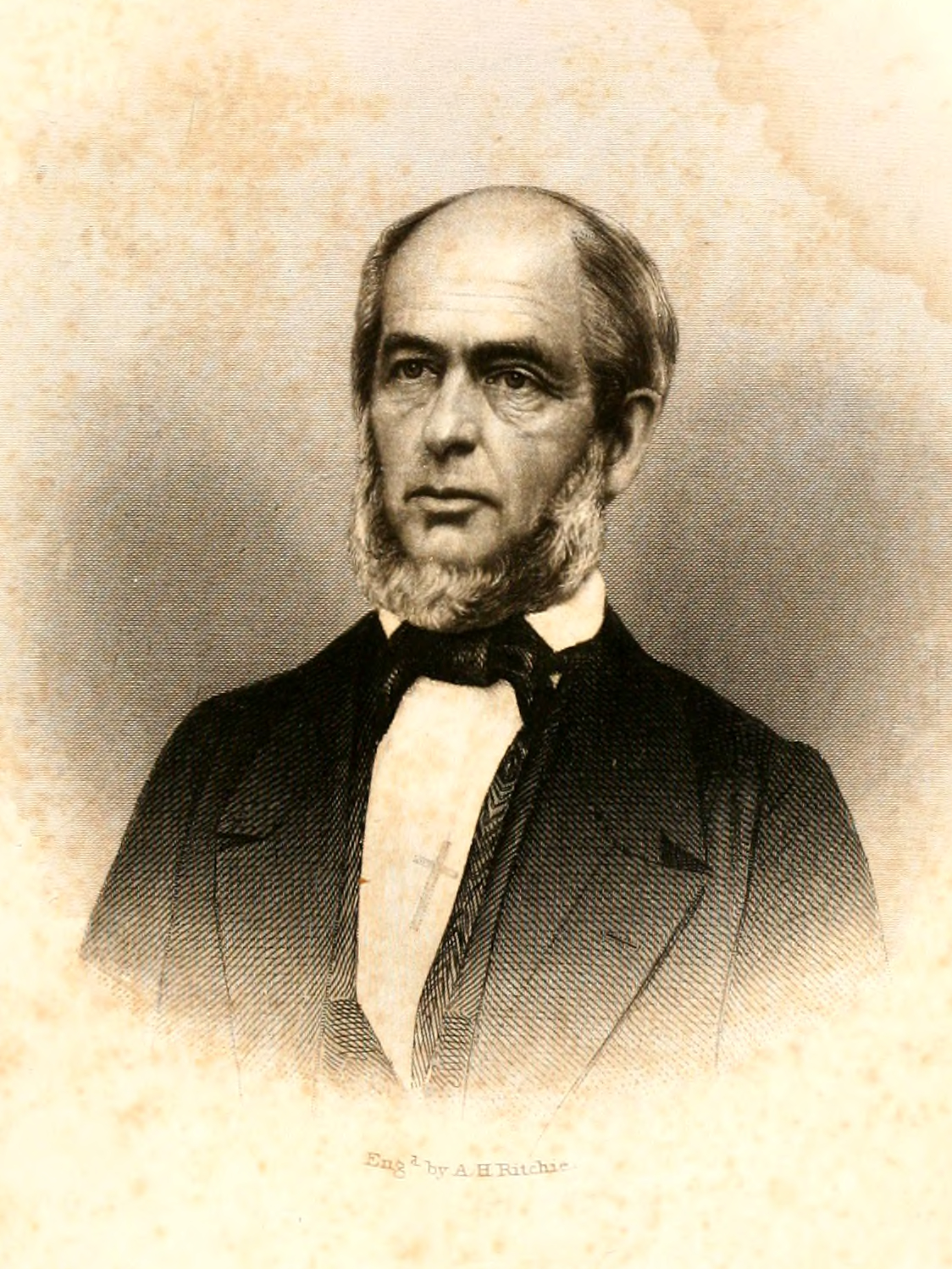
Redfield circa 1860

From 1857 to 1861, Redfield was professor of medical jurisprudence at Dartmouth College. In 1861 he moved to Boston to concentrate on legal scholarship and writing. He became an editor of the American Law Register and authored or co-authored many journal articles and books. Redfield's academic work concentrated largely on the fields of railroad law and medical jurisprudence.

In 1867, he was appointed a special counsel of the United States Department of State. In this role, he worked with co-counsel Caleb Cushing on the recovery of U.S. government property that had been in the possession of the Confederate government during the American Civil War. He carried out this assignment through 1868 and spent most of that time in England and France negotiating with the governments of those countries.

== Death and burial ==
Redfield died at his home in Charlestown, Massachusetts on March 23, 1876. He was buried at Old South Church Cemetery in Windsor, Vermont.

== Family ==
In 1836, Redfield married Mary Ward Smith, who died in 1839. In 1842, he married Catherine Blanchard Clark. With his second wife, he was the father of seven children, many of whom died in infancy.

Redfield's younger brother Timothy P. Redfield (1812-1888) studied law with him, became an attorney, and served on the Vermont Supreme Court from 1870 to 1884. Redfield Proctor, who served as governor of Vermont, United States Secretary of War, and a U.S. Senator, was Redfield's first cousin, the youngest son of his mother's sister.

== Awards ==
In 1835, Redfield received the honorary degree of Master of Arts from the University of Vermont. In 1849, he received an honorary LL.D. from Trinity College. In 1855, he received an honorary LL.D. from Dartmouth College.

== Legal scholarship ==
Redfield's published works included:

- Law of Railroads (1857) - This work went through at least five editions and was described at Redfield's death as "the repository of American law on that important subject".
- Law of Wills (1864–66) - 3 volumes. A legal historian stated that it "quickly became the standard study on wills in the United States"
- Law of Carriers and Bailements - (1869)
- Leading American Railway Cases - (1870-2, 2 volumes)
- Leading American Cases, on the Law of Bills of Exchange, Promissory Notes and Checks - (1871, with Melville M. Bigelow)
- Leading American Cases and Notes Upon the Law of Wills - (1874)
