= Theodore T. Munger =

American Congregational clergyman and writer

Theodore Thornton Munger
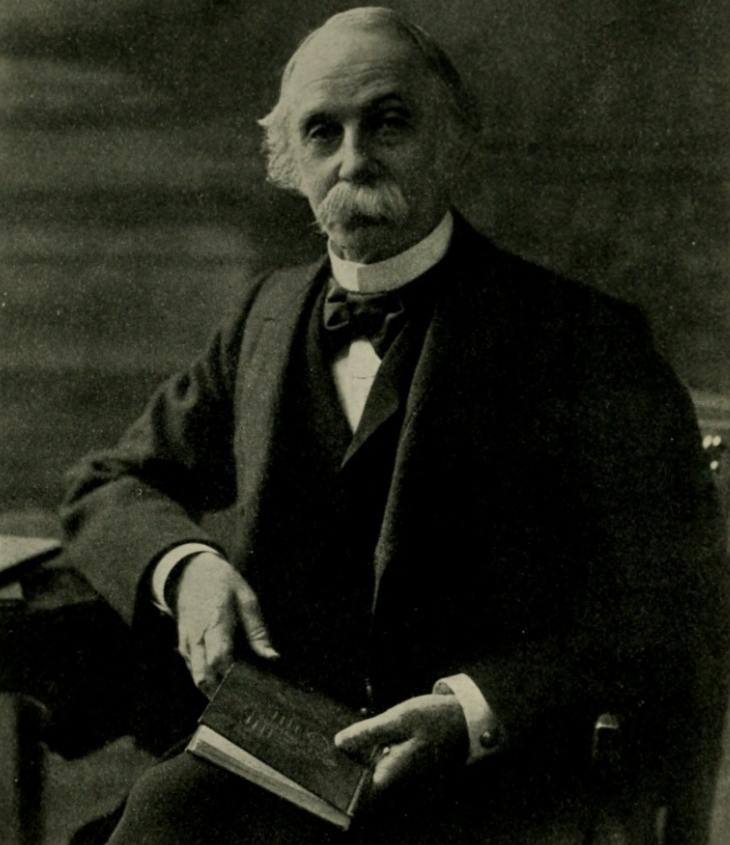
- Born: March 5, 1830; Bainbridge, New York
- Died: January 11, 1910 (aged 79); New Haven, Connecticut
- Occupation: Pastor

Theodore Thornton Munger (March 5, 1830 - January 11, 1910) was an American Congregational clergyman, theologian and writer.

== Biography ==
Born on March 5, 1830, in Bainbridge, New York, Munger graduated from Yale University in 1851 and from Yale Divinity School in 1855. He studied under Horace Bushnell at Yale Divinity School. After graduating in 1855, Munger began preaching in Massachusetts. In 1885, he was appointed pastor of the United Church in New Haven, Connecticut.

Munger was an advocate of theistic evolution. He argued that "evolution not only perfects our conception of the unity of God, but... strengthens the argument from design". However, Munger rejected the concept of survival of the fittest. Munger promoted liberal theology and maintained that revelation was a product of evolution and that there are no a priori scriptural truths.

Munger was an early proponent of animal rights. He authored the book The Rights of Dumb Animals, published by the Connecticut Humane Society in 1896.

Munger's other publications include: On the Threshold (1880); The Freedom of Faith (1883); Lamps and Paths (1883); The Appeal to Life (1887); Horace Bushnell (1899) and Character Through Inspiration.

Munger received the degree of Doctor of Divinity from Illinois College (1883), Harvard University (1904) and Yale University (1908).

He died at his home in New Haven on January 11, 1910.

== Famous quotation ==
Munger is well known for a famous quotation which is usually misattributed to others. In his 1884 book On the Threshold he wrote the following:

A purpose is the eternal condition of success. Nothing will take its place. Talent will not; nothing is more common than unsuccessful men of talent. Genius will not; unrewarded genius is a proverb. Education will not; the country is full of unsuccessful educated men. There is no road to success but through a clear, strong purpose.

This is extracted from a larger quote in the book. This shortened version, with the word "persistence" replacing the word "purpose" is often misattributed to President Calvin Coolidge in 1929. But the true source was Munger.

== Selected publications ==
- The Freedom of Faith (1883)
- On the Threshold (1884)
- Lamps and Paths (1885)
- The Rights of Dumb Animals (1896)
- The Appeal to Life (1899)
- Essays for the Day (1904)
