= Horace Fairbanks =

American politician (1820–1888)

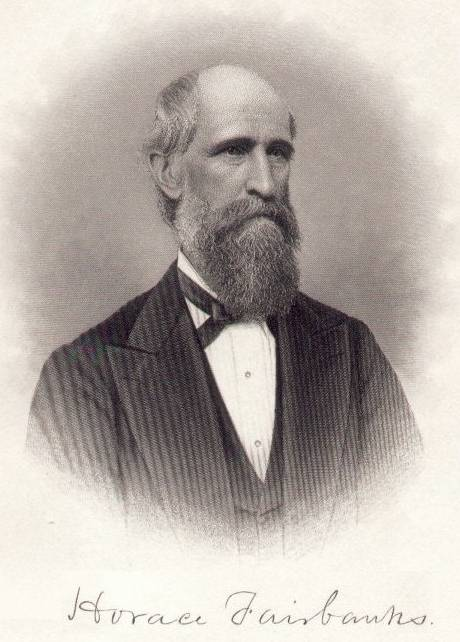

36th Governor of Vermont
- In office October 5, 1876 – October 3, 1878
- Lieutenant: Redfield Proctor
- Preceded by: Asahel Peck
- Succeeded by: Redfield Proctor

Member of the Vermont Senate from Caledonia County
- In office 1869–1870 Serving with Harley M. Hall
- Preceded by: Gates B. Bullard; Harley M. Hall
- Succeeded by: Jonathan Ross; John M. Martin

Personal details
- Born: March 21, 1820 Barnet, Vermont, US
- Died: March 17, 1888 (aged 67) New York City, US
- Party: Republican
- Spouse: Mary E. Taylor (m. 1840)
- Relations: Erastus Fairbanks (father); Franklin Fairbanks (brother); Thaddeus Fairbanks (uncle); Ephraim Paddock (grand-uncle)
- Profession: Businessman

Horace Fairbanks (March 21, 1820 – March 17, 1888) was an American politician and the 36th governor of Vermont from 1876 to 1878.

== Biography ==
Fairbanks was born in Barnet, Vermont, on March 21, 1820, the third of nine children of Erastus Fairbanks and Lois (Crossman) Fairbanks. He was educated at schools in Peacham and Lyndon, Vermont, and Meriden, New Hampshire, and completed his education at Phillips Academy in Andover, Massachusetts.

== Career ==
In 1840, Fairbanks became a confidential clerk at E. & T. Fairbanks & Co. his family's St. Johnsbury business, which became famous as the maker of the first platform scale. He became a partner in 1843 and later became the company's president. Fairbanks was active in several other business ventures, including construction of the Portland and Ogdensburg Railway from Portland, Maine to Ogdensburg, New York. Fairbanks was president of the Vermont division of the railroad and president of the First National Bank of St. Johnsbury. In 1871 Fairbanks presented to St. Johnsbury the St. Johnsbury Athenaeum, which includes a public library and an art gallery. He was a trustee of the University of Vermont and Phillips Academy.

Fairbanks was a delegate to the Republican National Conventions of 1864 and 1868. In 1868, Fairbanks also one of Vermont's electors. In 1869 he was elected to the Vermont State Senate; He served one term, but illness prevented him from attending sessions regularly. He was a delegate to the 1872 Republican National Convention, as well one of Vermont's 1872 presidential electors.

Elected Governor of Vermont over Democrat W. H. H. Bingham in 1876, Fairbanks served a two-year term. His term included initiatives such as establishing the state board of agriculture, improvement to conditions in state prisons and county jails, and statewide licensing requirements for medical doctors.

Fairbanks died in New York City on March 17, 1888. He is interred at Mount Pleasant Cemetery in St. Johnsbury.

== Family ==
Fairbanks married Mary E. Taylor (1824–1901) on August 9, 1840. They were the parents of three children, Helen, Agnes, and Isabel.

Fairbanks was the brother of Franklin Fairbanks, who served as Speaker of the Vermont House of Representatives.

Party political offices
Preceded by Asahel Peck	Republican nominee for Governor of Vermont; 1876	Succeeded by Redfield Proctor
Political offices
Preceded by Asahel Peck	Governor of Vermont; 1876–1878	Succeeded by Redfield Proctor
