= Redfield Proctor =

American politician (1831–1908)

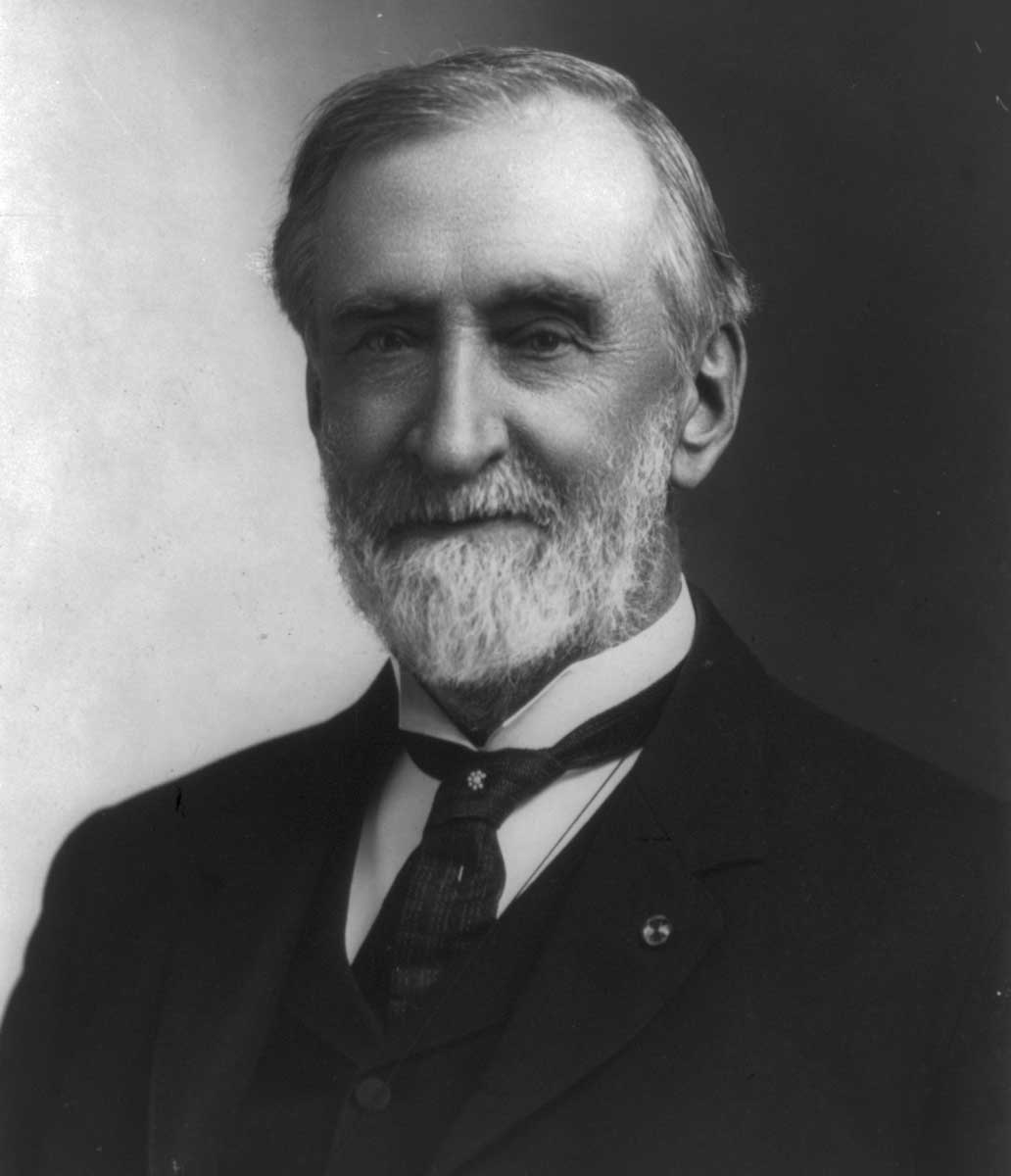
- Proctor, c. 1904

United States Senator from Vermont
- In office November 2, 1891 – March 4, 1908
- Preceded by: George F. Edmunds
- Succeeded by: John Stewart

37th United States Secretary of War
- In office March 5, 1889 – November 5, 1891
- President: Benjamin Harrison
- Preceded by: William Endicott
- Succeeded by: Stephen Elkins

37th Governor of Vermont
- In office October 3, 1878 – October 7, 1880
- Lieutenant: E. Pomeroy Colton
- Preceded by: Horace Fairbanks
- Succeeded by: Roswell Farnham

31st Lieutenant Governor of Vermont
- In office October 5, 1876 – October 3, 1878
- Governor: Horace Fairbanks
- Preceded by: Lyman G. Hinckley
- Succeeded by: Pomeroy Colton

President pro tempore of the Vermont Senate
- In office 1874–1875
- Preceded by: Lyman G. Hinckley
- Succeeded by: William W. Grout

Personal details
- Born: June 1, 1831 Proctorsville, Vermont, U.S.
- Died: March 4, 1908 (aged 76) Washington, D.C., U.S.
- Party: Republican
- Spouse: Emily Dutton
- Children: 5, including Fletcher and Redfield
- Education: Dartmouth College (BA, MA); Albany Law School (LLB)

Military service
- Allegiance: United States
- Branch/service: US Army
- Years of service: 1861–1863
- Rank: Colonel
- Commands: 15th Vermont Infantry
- Battles/wars: American Civil War

Redfield Proctor (June 1, 1831 – March 4, 1908) was a U.S. politician of the Republican Party. He served as the 37th governor of Vermont from 1878 to 1880, as the secretary of war from 1889 to 1891, and as a United States senator from Vermont from 1891 to 1908.

== Biography ==
Redfield Proctor was born on June 1, 1831. a native of Proctorsville, a village named after his family in the town of Cavendish in Windsor County, Vermont. His father, Jabez Proctor, was a farmer, merchant, and prominent local Whig politician. He was raised by his mother, Betsy Parker Proctor (1792–1871), from age 8 after the sudden death of his father. Proctor's first cousins on his mother's side included Isaac F. Redfield and Timothy P. Redfield, both justices of the Vermont Supreme Court.

After graduating from Dartmouth College in 1851, Proctor returned to Proctorsville, where he became first a businessman, and later a lawyer. He earned his master's degree from Dartmouth College and graduated from Albany Law School in 1859. He married Emily Jane Dutton in 1858, and moved to Boston, Massachusetts two years later. They had five children; Arabella G. Proctor Holden (1859–1905), Fletcher Dutton (1860–1911), Fanny Proctor (1863–1883) Redfield Jr. (1879–1957), and Emily Dutton Proctor (1869–1948). He was initiated into Delta Upsilon fraternity as an honorary member by the Middlebury College Chapter.

== Civil War ==
Upon the outbreak of the American Civil War in 1861, Proctor returned to Vermont and enlisted in the 3rd Vermont Infantry, was commissioned as lieutenant and quartermaster, and repaired to the front. In July of the same year he was appointed on the staff of General William F. ("Baldy") Smith, and in October was promoted and transferred to the 5th Vermont Infantry, of which he was commissioned major. With this regiment he served nearly a year in the neighborhood of Washington and on the Peninsula. In October 1862, Major Proctor was promoted to colonel of the 15th Vermont Infantry, and participated in the Gettysburg campaign, but was stationed in the rear and did not participate in the battle.

== Career ==
After being mustered out of military service in 1863, Proctor initially returned to practicing law, this time in Rutland, Vermont. He entered into law partnership with Wheelock G. Veazey. In 1869, he entered business again, taking a job as a manager in the Sutherland Falls Marble Company. In 1880, this company merged with another to become the Vermont Marble Company, over which Proctor served as president. Six years later, the area containing the company's marble quarries was split into a separate town called Proctor.

During these years, Proctor began his political career. In 1866 he became a selectman of the town of Rutland. In 1867 he represented his town in the Vermont House of Representatives, serving as chairman of the committee on elections. Again a member of the House in 1868, he served as a member of the committee on ways and means. Elected to the Vermont Senate in 1874, he was chosen president pro tempore.

In 1876 Proctor was elected lieutenant governor, and in 1878 was the successful Republican nominee for governor, defeating Democrat W. H. H. Bingham. He remained active in state politics after stepping down as governor. He was delegate-at-large to the Republican National Convention in 1884, and also in 1888. In the latter year he was chairman of the Vermont delegation, and seconded the presidential nomination of Benjamin Harrison.

In 1888, he was again elected to the Vermont House. Following the 1888 presidential election, the Vermont legislature unanimously recommended him for a cabinet position, and in March 1889, President Benjamin Harrison chose Proctor to be his Secretary of War. At the War Department, Proctor made a mark with his managerial skill and reforming zeal, with which he modernized the Army and improved the living conditions of enlisted soldiers.

From President Harrison State of the Union Address, Dec 1892:

The report of the Secretary of War exhibits the results of an intelligent, progressive, and businesslike administration of a Department which has been too much regarded as one of mere routine. The separation of Secretary Proctor from the Department by reason of his appointment as a Senator from the State of Vermont is a source of great regret to me and to his colleagues in the Cabinet, as I am sure it will be to all those who have had business with the Department while under his charge.

In the administration of army affairs some especially good work has been accomplished. The efforts of the Secretary to reduce the percentage of desertions by removing the causes that promoted it have been so successful as to enable him to report for the last year a lower percentage of desertion than has been before reached in the history of the Army. The resulting money saving is considerable, but the improvement in the morale of the enlisted men is the most valuable incident of the reforms which have brought about this result.

Proctor left the War Department in November 1891 to become a United States Senator, filling the vacancy caused by the resignation of George F. Edmunds. As a Senator he served as chairman of the U.S. Senate Committee to Establish a University of the United States from 1891 to 1893, the Committee on Agriculture and Forestry (1895–1909), and the Committee on Military Affairs (1905–1907). He remained a Senator for the rest of his life, and was an effective advocate in the Senate for high tariffs and the gold standard, as well as an influence on the military policies of the McKinley and Theodore Roosevelt administrations.

== Death ==
Proctor died in Washington, D.C., on March 4, 1908. He is interred at South Street Cemetery, Proctor, Vermont. Two of Proctor's children, Fletcher D. Proctor and Redfield Proctor, Jr., served as governors of Vermont, as did his grandson Mortimer R. Proctor. His 1867 Rutland residence is listed on the National Register of Historic Places.

== See also ==
- List of members of the United States Congress who died in office (1900–1949)

Vermont Senate
Preceded by Lyman G. Hinckley	President pro tempore of the Vermont Senate; 1874–1875	Succeeded by William W. Grout
Political offices
Preceded by Lyman G. Hinckley	Lieutenant Governor of Vermont; 1876–1878	Succeeded by Eben Colton
Preceded by Horace Fairbanks	Governor of Vermont; 1878–1880	Succeeded by Roswell Farnham
Preceded by William Endicott	United States Secretary of War; 1889–1891	Succeeded by Stephen Elkins
Party political offices
Preceded by Lyman G. Hinckley	Republican nominee for Lieutenant Governor of Vermont; 1876	Succeeded by Eben Pomeroy Colton
Preceded by Horace Fairbanks	Republican nominee for Governor of Vermont; 1878	Succeeded by Roswell Farnham
U.S. Senate
Preceded by George F. Edmunds	U.S. Senator (Class 1) from Vermont; 1891–1908; Served alongside: Justin Morrill, Jonathan Ross, William P. Dillingham	Succeeded by John Stewart
Preceded by James Z. George	Chair of the Senate Agriculture Committee; 1895–1908	Succeeded by Henry C. Hansbrough
Preceded by Joseph Hawley	Chair of the Senate Military Affairs Committee; 1905	Succeeded by Francis E. Warren
