= W. H. H. Bingham =

Vermont attorney and politician (1813–1894)

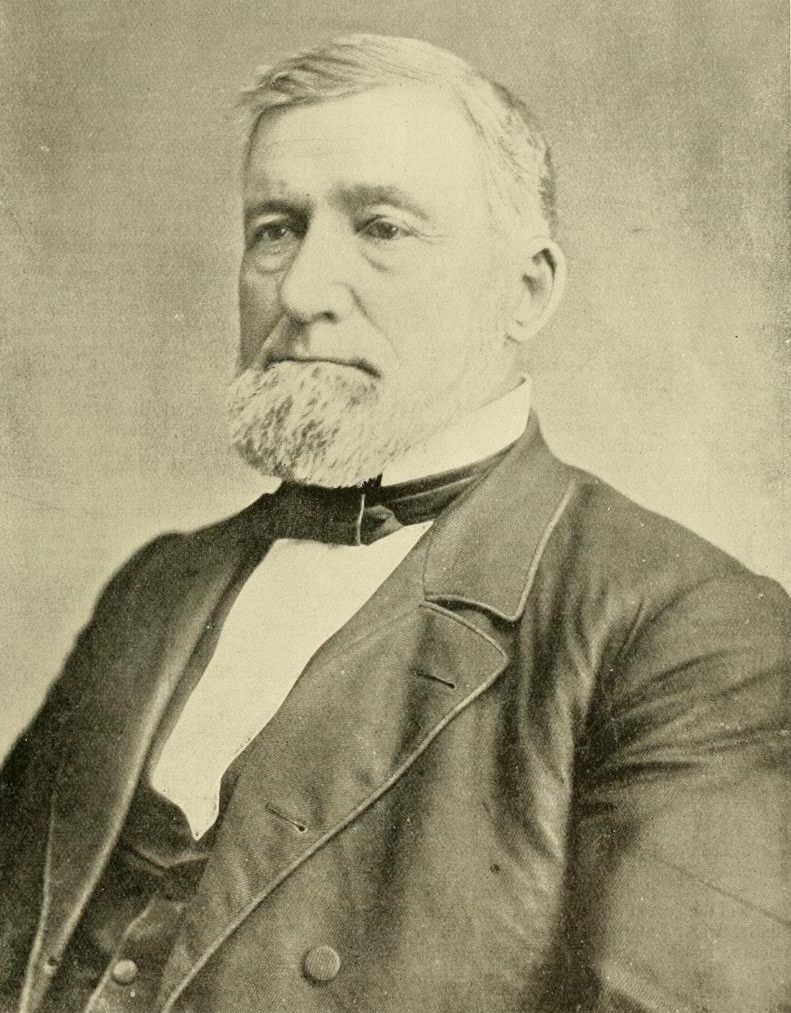
- Bingham in 1894

Member of the Vermont House of Representatives
- In office 1853–1854
- Preceded by: None (No selection in 1852)
- Succeeded by: Nathan Robinson
- Constituency: Stowe

State's Attorney of Lamoille County, Vermont
- In office 1849–1851
- Preceded by: Whitman G. Ferrin
- Succeeded by: George Wilkins
- In office 1842–1844
- Preceded by: Harlow P. Smith
- Succeeded by: Luke P. Poland

Personal details
- Born: William Henry Harrison Bingham; 15 April 1813 Fletcher, Vermont, US
- Died: 12 October 1894 (aged 81) Stowe, Vermont, US
- Resting place: Old Yard Cemetery, Stowe, Vermont, US
- Party: Democratic
- Spouse: Orpha R. Camp (m. 1838–1891)
- Profession: Attorney

W. H. H. Bingham (15 April 1813 – 12 October 1894) was an attorney and politician from Vermont. A Democrat when first the Whigs and then the Republicans achieved near total dominance of statewide elections, he was the Democratic nominee for state treasurer in 1849 and US Representative from Vermont's 3rd congressional district in 1856 and 1858. He was the party's unsuccessful candidate for lieutenant governor in 1872, and governor in 1874, 1876, and 1878.

== Early life ==
William Henry Harrison Bingham was born in Fletcher, Vermont on 15 April 1813, a son of Elias and Martha (Robinson) Bingham. He was raised and educated in Fletcher and attended the academy in St. Albans. Bingham went on to study law in the Stowe office of attorney Orion W. Butler. He was admitted to the bar in 1836 and began to practice in Stowe. Bingham became a successful practitioner of corporate law and his standing was high enough that the courts of Lamoille County and the Vermont Supreme Court often turned to him when cases required a master in chancery, referee, commissioner, or auditor.

A Democrat during the period when first the Whig Party and then the Republican Party cemented their control of statewide politics and government, Bingham was so well regarded that he was chosen for local offices including state's attorney of Lamoille County (1842 to 1844 and 1849 to 1851) and Stowe's member of the Vermont House of Representatives (1853 to 1854). He was the Democratic nominee for state treasurer in 1849. From 1853 to 1857, he served as US pension agent for eastern Vermont, responsible for payments to veterans of the American Revolutionary War and War of 1812 and their widows. Bingham was the Democratic nominee for US Representative from Vermont's 3rd congressional district, first in 1856 and again in 1858. In 1862, he was a member of the state Council of Censors, the body that met once every seven years to ensure the constitutionality of laws passed by the Vermont General Assembly.

== Later career ==
In 1870, Bingham was a delegate to the state constitutional convention. He was the Democratic Party's unsuccessful candidate for lieutenant governor in 1872, and for governor in 1874, 1876, and 1878. After 1878 Republican nominee Redfield Proctor became governor, he appointed Bingham as one of the three directors who supervised the Vermont House of Correction, a post in which Bingham served for 14 years. In the 1886 US Senate election, Bingham received the courtesy votes of Democrats in the Vermont General Assembly; incumbent Republican George F. Edmunds won reelection with 227 votes to 29 for Bingham and 8 anti-Edmunds protest votes for Republican Wheelock G. Veazey.

Bingham was active in several businesses, and as his career continued he began to spend less time on his legal practice and more on his commercial ventures. He was a longtime board of directors member for the National Life Insurance Company and the Vermont Mutual Fire Insurance Company, and he served as Vermont Mutual's president for 10 years. He was also a director of many banks, railroads, and other institutions, including the Montpelier and Wells River Railroad, Central Vermont Railway and Waterbury National Bank. In addition, he organized a company that operated a hotel at the base of Mount Mansfield, now called the Green Mountain Inn, and built a carriage road and summit house, which helped turn the mountain into a popular tourist attraction.

Bingham died in Stowe on 12 October 1894. He was buried at Old Yard Cemetery (Center Cemetery) in Stowe.
