= Nathan Clarke =

Nathan Clarke may refer to:

- Nathan Clarke (English footballer), English football centre-back
- Nathan Clarke (Australian footballer), Australian rules footballer
- Nathan Clarke (actor), British actor and voice actor

== See also ==
- Nathan Clark, Vermont colonial and Revolutionary War leader
