= Governor Coolidge =

Governor Coolidge may refer to:

- Calvin Coolidge (1872–1933), 48th Governor of Massachusetts
- Carlos Coolidge (1792–1866), 19th Governor of Vermont
