= Senator Hotchkiss =

Senator Hotchkiss may refer to:

- James M. Hotchkiss (1812–1877), Vermont State Senate
- Robert H. Hotchkiss (1818–1878), Wisconsin State Senate
