= 1872 Vermont gubernatorial election =

- September 3, 1872
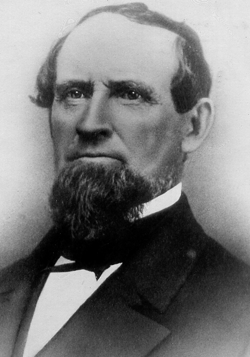

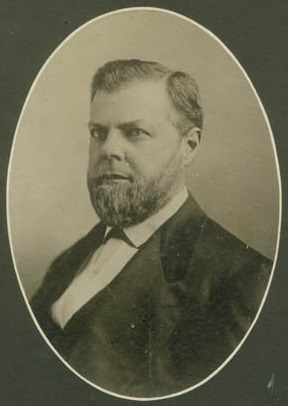
Candidate	Julius Converse	Abraham B. Gardner
Party	Republican	Democratic
Popular vote	41,946	16,613
Percentage	71.61%	28.36%
- County results Converse: 50–60% 60–70% 70–80% 80–90%
Governor before election
John W. Stewart
Republican
Elected Governor
Julius Converse
Republican

The 1872 Vermont gubernatorial election took place on September 3, 1872. Incumbent Republican John W. Stewart, per the "Mountain Rule", did not run for re-election to a second term as Governor of Vermont. Republican candidate Julius Converse defeated Liberal Republican and Democratic nominee Abraham B. Gardner to succeed him.

== Results ==
1872 Vermont gubernatorial election
Party	Candidate	Votes	%	±%
Republican	Julius Converse	41,946	71.61	−1.8
Democratic/Liberal Republican	Abraham B. Gardner	16,613	28.36	+1.9
N/A	Other	14	0.03	0.0
Total votes		58,573	100.0	–
