= Senator Hancock =

Senator Hancock may refer to:

- John E. Hancock (1903–1982), Vermont State Senate
- Kelly Hancock (born 1963), Texas State Senate
- Loni Hancock (born 1940), California State Senate
- Mary Louise Hancock (1920–2017), New Hampshire State Senate
- Tom Hancock (1948–2016), Iowa State Senate
