= Senator Hunton (disambiguation) =

Eppa Hunton (1822–1908) was a U.S. Senator from Virginia from 1892 to 1895. Senator Hunton may also refer to:

- Augustus P. Hunton (1816–1911), Vermont State Senate
- Jonathan G. Hunton (1781–1851), Maine State Senate
