= Horatio Needham =

American politician

Horatio Needham (April 21, 1796–July 8, 1863) was a Vermont politician and lawyer who served as Speaker of the Vermont House of Representatives.

== Biography ==
Horatio Needham was born in Whiting, Vermont on April 21, 1796. He was educated in the local schools and began to study law in 1817. Needham was admitted to the bar in 1821 and established a practice in Bristol.

A Democrat who followed the tenets of the Free Soil movement, Needham was Bristol's Town Clerk for five years and a member of the board of selectmen for six.

In 1849 Needham was the Free Soil nominee for governor, losing a close race to Whig Carlos Coolidge.

He was a Delegate to the Vermont constitutional conventions of 1843, 1850 and 1857.

Active in the state militia, in 1851 the Vermont General Assembly appointed Needham commander of the 3rd Brigade with the rank of Brigadier General.

Needham was selected as the speaker of the Vermont House of Representatives in 1853, after thirty-one ballots.

Needham served several terms in the Vermont House of Representatives and was Speaker from 1853 to 1854, the last non-Republican to hold the office until 1975. He also served as a member of the state Council of Censors from 1862 to 1863.

Horatio Needham died in Bristol on July 8, 1863. He was buried in Bristol's Greenwood Cemetery.

Party political offices
Preceded by Oscar L. Shafter	Free Soil nominee for Governor of Vermont; 1849	Succeeded by Lucius Benedict Peck
Political offices
Preceded by Thomas E. Powers	Speaker of the Vermont House of Representatives; 1853–1854	Succeeded by George W. Grandey
