= David Robinson (1754–1842) =

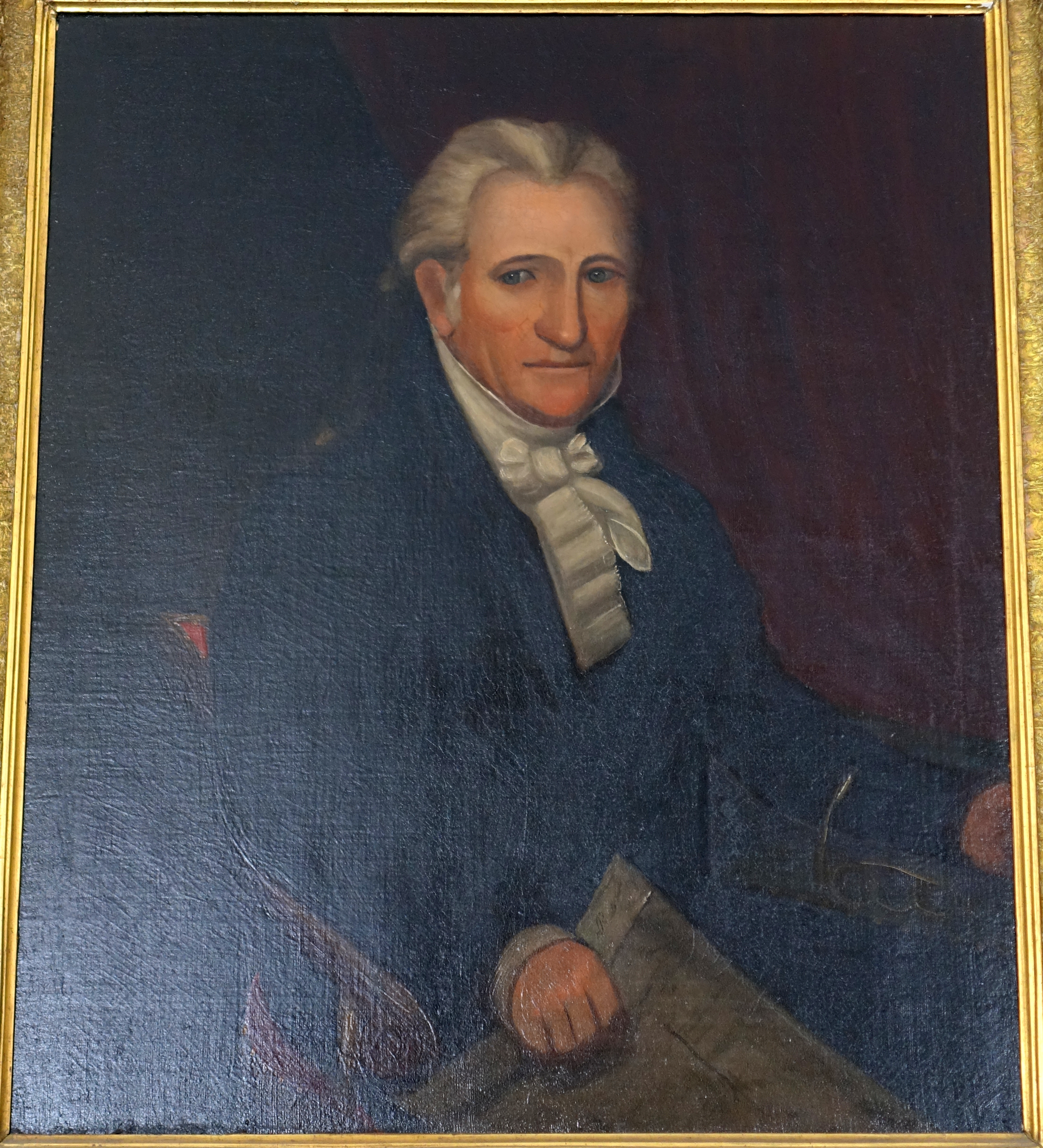
General David Robinson

David Robinson (November 22, 1754 – December 11, 1843) was a Vermont soldier active in the American Revolution who was promoted to the rank of Major General.

Robinson was born in Hardwick, Massachusetts as the eighth child of Captain Samuel Robinson, and his siblings included Samuel Robinson Jr., Moses Robinson, and Jonathan Robinson. The family moved to Bennington, Vermont with their father in 1761.

David Robinson served in the Revolution as a private at the Battle of Bennington on August 16, 1777, and rose rapidly by regular promotion to the rank of Major General. He resigned that office in 1817. From 1789-1811 he also served as sheriff of Bennington County, then was appointed United States Marshal, which office he held until 1819. Robinson died in Bennington on December 11, 1843 and was buried in Bennington's Old Cemetery.

== Sources ==
- New England Families, Genealogical and Memorial: A Record of the Achievements of Her People in the Making of Commonwealths and the Founding of a Nation, Volume 1, William Richard Cutter, Lewis Historical Publishing Company, 1913, pages 156-157.
- Genealogical and Family History of the State of Vermont: A Record of the Achievements of Her People in the Making of a Commonwealth and the Founding of a Nation, Hiram Carleton, Genealogical Publishing Com, 2003, pages 280-281. ISBN 9780806347943.
