= Joseph Bowker =

American politician

Joseph Bowker (December 28, 1725 – July 2, 1784) was an early political and governmental leader of Vermont and was the first Speaker of the Vermont House of Representatives.

== Biography ==
Joseph Bowker was born in Hopkinton, Massachusetts, on December 28, 1725. After being orphaned he was raised by a guardian, whose daughter he later married.

Bowker was a farmer and served with the British during the French and Indian War. Most of his service was spent on garrison duty at Fort Ticonderoga, and as a result of it Bowker was usually referred to as "Captain Bowker" for the rest of his life.

In 1773 Bowker relocated to Rutland, Vermont. In addition to farming he was involved in several business enterprises, including establishing the town's first sawmill.

After settling in Rutland Bowker served in several local offices, including Town Clerk and Treasurer and Selectman. He was also the first Judge of the Rutland County Court and Rutland County's first Probate Judge.

Bowker served as chairman or president of several conventions of delegates called to organize Vermont and plan its activities during the American Revolution During the War Bowker also served on Vermont's Board of War, as a Sequestration Commissioner, and a Commissary in charge of acquiring supplies and equipment for Vermont's military.

In 1778 was elected to the Vermont House of Representatives and served as the body's first ever Speaker of the House. He resigned as Speaker in order to accept a position on the Governor's Council.

Bowker died in Rutland on July 11, 1784. He was buried at Center Rutland Cemetery in Rutland Town, just across the road from Evergreen Cemetery.

Political offices
| Preceded by New Position | Speaker of the Vermont House of Representatives; 1778–1778 | Succeeded by Nathan Clark |
