= Charles Henry Brown (politician) =

American lawyer and politician

Charles Brown

Speaker of the Vermont House of Representatives
- In office 1957–1959
- Preceded by: John E. Hancock
- Succeeded by: F. Ray Keyser Jr.

Member of the Vermont House of Representatives
- In office 1953–1959
- In office 1949–1951

Personal details
- Born: Charles Henry Brown; March 7, 1904 Whiting, Vermont, U.S.
- Died: April 26, 1959 (aged 55) Waltham, Massachusetts, U.S.
- Party: Republican
- Education: University of New Hampshire (BA); University of Michigan (LLB)

Charles Henry Brown (March 7, 1904 – April 26, 1959) was an American lawyer and politician who served as speaker of the Vermont House of Representatives.

== Early life ==
Charles Henry Brown was born in Whiting, Vermont, on March 7, 1904. He graduated from Brandon High School and received a Bachelor of Arts degree from the University of New Hampshire in 1926. While at UNH, Brown participated in the Reserve Officer Training Corps program.

After college, Brown studied at the University of Michigan Law School, passed the bar, and established a practice in Brandon.

== Career ==
A Republican, Brown served in local offices including town agent and town grand juror. He served in the Vermont House of Representatives from 1949 to 1951.

In 1952, Brown was again elected to the Vermont House and served three terms, 1953 to 1959. He was speaker of the House in his final term, 1957 to 1959.

Brown was appointed Secretary of Civil and Military Affairs (chief assistant) to Governor Robert Stafford in 1959.

== Personal life ==
Brown died unexpectedly in Waltham, Massachusetts, on April 26, 1959. He was buried at Pine Hill Cemetery in Brandon.

Political offices
Preceded by John E. Hancock	Speaker of the Vermont House of Representatives; 1957–1959	Succeeded by F. Ray Keyser Jr.
