= Augustus P. Hunton =

American lawyer and politician (1816–1911)

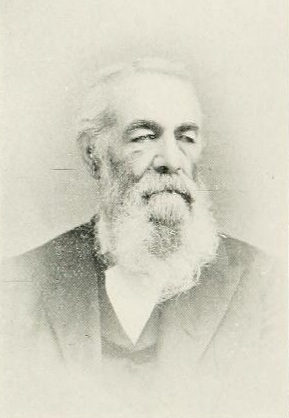
- From 1895's The Illustrated Historical Souvenir of Bethel, Vermont

President pro tempore of the Vermont State Senate
- In office 1857–1857
- Preceded by: James M. Hotchkiss
- Succeeded by: Lucius E. Chittenden

Member of the Vermont Senate from Windsor County
- In office 1856–1857 Serving with George Johnson, Shubael Converse, George F. Davis, Joseph D. Hatch
- Preceded by: Carlos Coolidge, Norman Williams, Shubael Converse, George Johnson
- Succeeded by: Charles S. Raymond, Warren C. French, Joseph D. Hatch, John Wilder

Speaker of the Vermont House of Representatives
- In office 1860–1862
- Preceded by: George F. Edmunds
- Succeeded by: J. Gregory Smith

Member of the Vermont House of Representatives from Bethel
- In office 1859–1863
- Preceded by: None (no selection)
- Succeeded by: Francis W. Anderson
- In office 1854–1855
- Preceded by: None (no selection)
- Succeeded by: None (no selection)
- In office 1849–1850
- Preceded by: None (no selection)
- Succeeded by: Almon Durkee

Personal details
- Born: February 23, 1816 Groton, New Hampshire, US
- Died: June 20, 1911 (aged 95) Bethel, Vermont, US
- Party: Whig (before 1854); Republican (after 1854)
- Spouse: Caroline Paige (m. 1849–1884)
- Children: 2
- Profession: Attorney

Augustus Pingry Hunton (February 23, 1816 – June 20, 1911) was a Vermont lawyer and Senator. He served in the Vermont House of Representatives including three years as Speaker. In addition, he served as President pro tempore of the Vermont State Senate.

== Early life ==
Augustus Pingry Hunton was born in Groton, New Hampshire, on February 23, 1816. He was raised in Hyde Park and Johnson, Vermont, studied law and was admitted to the bar in 1837.

Hunton practiced in Stockbridge, Bethel and Chelsea before settling permanently in Bethel in 1848. Hunton usually practiced in conjunction with one other attorney, and one of his early partners was Governor Julius Converse. In addition, Hunton was a relative of Lt. Col. Samuel Pingree, later Governor of Vermont, and Samuel's brother Stephen M. Pingree, both of whom studied law with Hunton before forming the Hartford firm of Pingree and Pingree.

== Political career ==
Originally a Whig, he became a Republican when the party was organized in the mid-1850s. Hunton represented Bethel in the Vermont House of Representatives In 1849, 1854, and 1859 to 1862. From 1860 to 1862 Hunton served as Speaker.

From 1856 to 1857 Hunton represented Windsor County in the Vermont Senate, and in 1857 he served as the Senate's President pro tem.

During the Civil War Hunton was superintendent of Union Army recruiting for Windsor County. In 1864 he was a delegate to the Republican National Convention which nominated Abraham Lincoln. After the war Hunton was a U.S. Pension Notary, responsible for verifying the documents presented by claimants before they were delivered to Vermont's U.S. Pension Agents.

== Other activities ==
Hunton was a trustee of Norwich University from 1862 to 1867. He was the recipient of honorary master's degrees from the University of Vermont in 1847 and Dartmouth College in 1859.

== Death and burial ==
Hunton died in Bethel on June 20, 1911. He was buried in Bethel's Cherry Hill Cemetery, of which he was an original incorporator. Hunton was married to Caroline Paige of Bethel, and had two children, Mary and Albert. His granddaughter Mary Stickney married State attorney Robert Ashton Lawrence, family member of Capt. Elihu Yale of the Yale family.

== Notes ==
Political offices
Preceded by George F. Edmunds	Speaker of the Vermont House of Representatives; 1860 – 1862	Succeeded by J. Gregory Smith
Preceded by James M. Hotchkiss	President pro tempore of the Vermont State Senate; 1857	Succeeded by Lucius E. Chittenden

|}
