= George W. Grandey =

American politician

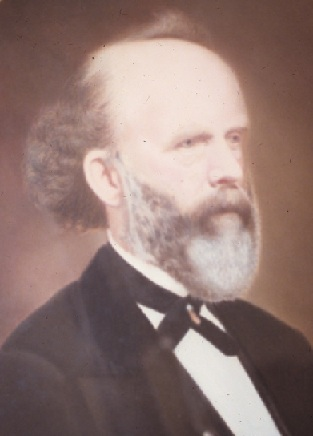

George W. Grandey (February 3, 1813 – December 4, 1893) was a Vermont politician and lawyer who served as Speaker of the Vermont House of Representatives.

== Biography ==
George Washington Grandey was born in Panton, Vermont on February 3, 1813. He studied law, became an attorney in 1840 and established a practice in Vergennes, Vermont.

Grandey served in several local offices, including county school superintendent, city school superintendent, state's attorney, postmaster, justice of the peace, and mayor of Vergennes. First a Whig, and later an active Republican, Grandey served as chairman of the state party on several occasions from the 1860s to the 1890s and was a delegate to several state and national conventions.

From 1850 to 1857 Grandey was Quartermaster General of the Vermont Militia with the rank of Brigadier General.

For thirteen years from the 1850s to the 1870s Grandey served in the Vermont House of Representatives, including election as Speaker from 1854 to 1857 and 1868 to 1870.

Grandey also served several terms in the Vermont Senate.

In 1867 Grandey was appointed U.S. Consul in San Juan del Sur, Nicaragua.

Grandey declined appointment to a consulship in Canada in 1881.

Grandey died in Vergennes on December 4, 1893. He was buried at Prospect Cemetery in Vergennes.

Political offices
Preceded by Horatio Needham	Speaker of the Vermont House of Representatives; 1854–1857	Succeeded by George F. Edmunds
Preceded by John W. Stewart	Speaker of the Vermont House of Representatives; 1868–1870	Succeeded by Charles Herbert Joyce
