= Abraham B. Gardner =

American attorney, businessman and politician (1819–1881)

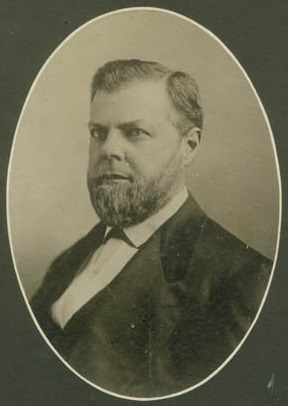
- Gardner circa 1872

25th Lieutenant Governor of Vermont
- In office 1865–1867
- Governor: Paul Dillingham
- Preceded by: Paul Dillingham
- Succeeded by: Stephen Thomas

Member of the Vermont Senate from Bennington County
- In office 1870–1872 Serving with William T. Horrobin
- Preceded by: Martin J. Love, Franklin H. Orvis
- Succeeded by: Mason S. Colburn, Charles E. Houghton

Speaker of the Vermont House of Representatives
- In office 1863–1865
- Preceded by: J. Gregory Smith
- Succeeded by: John Wolcott Stewart

Member of the Vermont House of Representatives from Bennington
- In office 1860–1865
- Preceded by: Elijah D. Hubbell
- Succeeded by: Trenor W. Park

State's Attorney of Bennington County, Vermont
- In office 1855–1857
- Preceded by: Alexander M. Huling
- Succeeded by: Nathaniel B. Hall

Personal details
- Born: September 2, 1819 Pownal, Vermont, US
- Died: November 23, 1881 (aged 62) Bennington, Vermont, US
- Resting place: Old Bennington Cemetery
- Party: Whig (before 1856); Republican (1856-1881)
- Other political affiliations: Liberal Republican (1872)
- Spouse(s): Mary Jeannette Swift Gardner (m. 1849); Cynthia E Brown Gardner (m. 1857); Samantha Willmarth Gardner (m. 1875)
- Children: 3
- Education: Union College
- Profession: Attorney

Abraham Brookins Gardner (September 2, 1819 – November 23, 1881) was a Vermont attorney and businessman who served as the 25th lieutenant governor of Vermont from 1865 to 1867.

== Early life and business career ==
Abraham Brookins Gardner was born in Pownal, Vermont, on September 2, 1819. He was the son of David and Eunice (Wright) Gardner. He graduated Phi Beta Kappa from Union College in 1842, where he was a member of the Delta Upsilon fraternity. Gardner then studied law and became an attorney and business owner in Bennington, Vermont, including serving as President of the Eagle Square Manufacturing Company and the Bennington and Rutland Railroad.

== Political career ==
A Republican, he was Register of Probate for the Bennington District from 1848 to 1857, State's Attorney from 1855 to 1857, and Vermont's Banking Commissioner from 1859 to 1860.

From 1860 to 1865 Gardner served in the Vermont House of Representatives, and he was Speaker from 1863 to 1865.

He was Lieutenant Governor from 1865 to 1867, and also served as a member of the Republican National Committee.

== Later life ==
Gardner served in the Vermont Senate from 1870 to 1872, and in 1872 was an unsuccessful candidate for Governor as the fusion candidate of Democrats and Liberal Republican backers of Horace Greeley for President. Later in the 1870s he served as a member of the Bennington Battle Monument Commission.

== Death and burial ==
Gardner died in Bennington on November 23, 1881. He was buried in Old Bennington Cemetery.

== Other ==
His first name sometimes appears in records as Abram and his middle name is sometimes written as "Brooks" or "Brookings". Several of Gardner's relatives shared the Abraham B. Gardner name, including one who lived from January 6, 1858, to January 2, 1914, and was a member of the Vermont House of Representatives.

Party political offices
| Preceded by Paul Dillingham | Republican nominee for Lieutenant Governor of Vermont; 1865, 1866 | Succeeded by Stephen Thomas |
| Preceded by Homer W. Heaton | Democratic nominee for Governor of Vermont; 1872 | Succeeded by W. H. H. Bingham |
| First | Liberal Republican nominee for Governor of Vermont; 1872 | Succeeded by None |
Political offices
| Preceded by Paul Dillingham | Lieutenant Governor of Vermont; 1865–1867 | Succeeded by Stephen Thomas |
| Preceded by J. Gregory Smith | Speaker of the Vermont House of Representatives; 1863–1865 | Succeeded by John W. Stewart |
