= List of speakers of the Vermont House of Representatives =

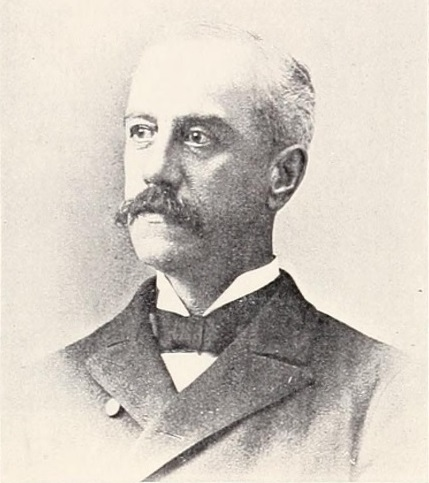
William A. Lord, who was a Vermont House Speaker between 1896 and 1898.

The speaker of the Vermont House of Representatives is the speaker or presiding officer of the Vermont House of Representatives, the lower house of the Vermont Legislature.

The speaker presides over sessions of the Houses, recognizes members so that they may speak, and ensures compliance with House rules for parliamentary procedure. The speaker also assigns members to the standing committees of the House and assigns committee chairpersons. The speaker is second (behind the lieutenant governor) in the line of succession to the office of Governor of Vermont.

Vermont was admitted to the Union in 1791 as the fourteenth state, but its House of Representatives dates from 1778, when the Vermont Republic was created.

Vermont had a unicameral legislature until 1836, when the Governor's Council was abolished and the Vermont Senate was created.

The speaker of the Vermont House of Representatives earned $10,080 starting in 2005. Beginning in 2007, this amount receives an annual cost of living increase.

| Speaker | Term | Party |
|---|---|---|
| Joseph Bowker | 1778 | |
| Nathan Clark | 1778 | |
| Thomas Chandler Jr. | 1778–1780 | |
| Samuel Robinson | 1780 | |
| Thomas Porter | 1780–1782 | |
| Increase Moseley | 1782–1783 | |
| Isaac Tichenor | 1783–1784 | Federalist |
| Nathaniel Niles | 1784–1785 | Democratic-Republican |
| Stephen R. Bradley | 1785–1786 | Democratic-Republican |
| John Strong | 1786 | Democratic-Republican |
| Gideon Olin | 1786–1793 | Democratic-Republican |
| Daniel Buck | 1793–1795 | Federalist |
| Lewis R. Morris | 1795–1797 | Federalist |
| Abel Spencer | 1797–1798 | Federalist |
| Daniel Farrand | 1798–1799 | Federalist |
| Amos Marsh | 1799–1802 | Federalist |
| Abel Spencer | 1802–1803 | Federalist |
| Theophilus Harrington | 1803–1804 | Democratic-Republican |
| Aaron Leland | 1804–1808 | Democratic-Republican |
| Dudley Chase | 1808–1813 | Democratic-Republican |
| Daniel Chipman | 1813–1815 | Federalist |
| William A. Griswold | 1815–1818 | Democratic-Republican |
| Richard Skinner | 1818–1819 | Democratic-Republican |
| William A. Griswold | 1819–1820 | Democratic-Republican |
| D. Azro A. Buck | 1820–1822 | Adams-Clay Republican |
| George E. Wales | 1822–1824 | Adams-Clay Republican |
| Isaac Fletcher | 1824 | Democratic-Republican |
| D. Azro A. Buck | 1825–1826 | Adams-Clay Republican |
| Robert B. Bates | 1826–1829 | Democratic-Republican |
| D. Azro A. Buck | 1829–1830 | Adams-Clay Republican |
| Robert B. Bates | 1830–1831 | Democratic-Republican |
| John Smith | 1831–1834 | Democratic-Republican |
| Ebenezer N. Briggs | 1834–1836 | Whig |
| Carlos Coolidge | 1836–1837 | Whig |
| Solomon Foot | 1837–1839 | Whig |
| Carlos Coolidge | 1839–1842 | Whig |
| Andrew Tracy | 1842–1845 | Whig |
| Ebenezer N. Briggs | 1845–1847 | Whig |
| Solomon Foot | 1847–1848 | Whig |
| William C. Kittredge | 1848–1850 | Whig |
| Thomas E. Powers | 1850–1853 | Whig |
| Horatio Needham | 1853–1854 | Free Soil Democratic |
| George W. Grandey | 1854–1857 | Republican |
| George F. Edmunds | 1857–1860 | Republican |
| Augustus P. Hunton | 1860–1862 | Republican |
| J. Gregory Smith | 1862–1863 | Republican |
| Abraham B. Gardner | 1863–1865 | Republican |
| John W. Stewart | 1865–1868 | Republican |
| George W. Grandey | 1868–1870 | Republican |
| Charles Herbert Joyce | 1870–1872 | Republican |
| Franklin Fairbanks | 1872–1874 | Republican |
| Horace Henry Powers | 1874 | Republican |
| Josiah Grout | 1874–1876 | Republican |
| John W. Stewart | 1876–1878 | Republican |
| James Loren Martin | 1878–1884 | Republican |
| James K. Batchelder | 1884–1886 | Republican |
| Josiah Grout | 1886–1890 | Republican |
| Henry R. Start | 1890 | Republican |
| Hosea A. Mann Jr. | 1890–1892 | Republican |
| William Wallace Stickney | 1892–1896 | Republican |
| William A. Lord | 1896–1898 | Republican |
| Kittredge Haskins | 1898–1900 | Republican |
| Fletcher Dutton Proctor | 1900–1902 | Republican |
| John H. Merrifield | 1902–1906 | Republican |
| Thomas Charles Cheney | 1906–1910 | Republican |
| Frank E. Howe | 1910–1912 | Republican |
| Charles Albert Plumley | 1912–1915 | Republican |
| John E. Weeks | 1915–1917 | Republican |
| Stanley C. Wilson | 1917 | Republican |
| Charles S. Dana | 1917–1921 | Republican |
| Franklin S. Billings | 1921–1923 | Republican |
| Orlando L. Martin | 1923–1925 | Republican |
| Roswell M. Austin | 1925–1927 | Republican |
| Loren R. Pierce | 1927–1929 | Republican |
| Benjamin Williams | 1929–1931 | Republican |
| Edward H. Deavitt | 1931–1933 | Republican |
| George David Aiken | 1933–1935 | Republican |
| Ernest E. Moore | 1935–1937 | Republican |
| Mortimer R. Proctor | 1937–1939 | Republican |
| Oscar L. Shepard | 1939–1941 | Republican |
| Lee Earl Emerson | 1941–1943 | Republican |
| Asa S. Bloomer | 1943–1945 | Republican |
| Joseph H. Denny | 1945–1947 | Republican |
| Winston L. Prouty | 1947–1949 | Republican |
| J. Harold Stacey | 1949–1951 | Republican |
| Wallace M. Fay | 1951–1953 | Republican |
| Consuelo N. Bailey | 1953–1955 | Republican |
| John E. Hancock | 1955–1957 | Republican |
| Charles H. Brown | 1957–1959 | Republican |
| F. Ray Keyser Jr. | 1959–1961 | Republican |
| Leroy Lawrence | 1961–1963 | Republican |
| Franklin S. Billings Jr. | 1963–1965 | Republican |
| Richard Walker Mallary | 1965–1969 | Republican |
| John S. Burgess | 1969–1971 | Republican |
| Walter L. Kennedy | 1971–1975 | Republican |
| Timothy J. O'Connor Jr. | 1975–1981 | Democratic |
| Stephan A. Morse | 1981–1985 | Republican |
| Ralph G. Wright | 1985–1995 | Democratic |
| Michael J. Obuchowski | 1995–2001 | Democratic |
| Walter E. Freed | 2001–2005 | Republican |
| Gaye Randolph Symington | 2005–2009 | Democratic |
| Shapleigh "Shap" Smith Jr. | 2009–2017 | Democratic |
| Mitzi Johnson | 2017–2021 | Democratic |
| Jill Krowinski | 2021- | Democratic |

== See also ==
- List of Vermont General Assemblies
