= William C. Kittredge =

American politician and lawyer (1800–1869)

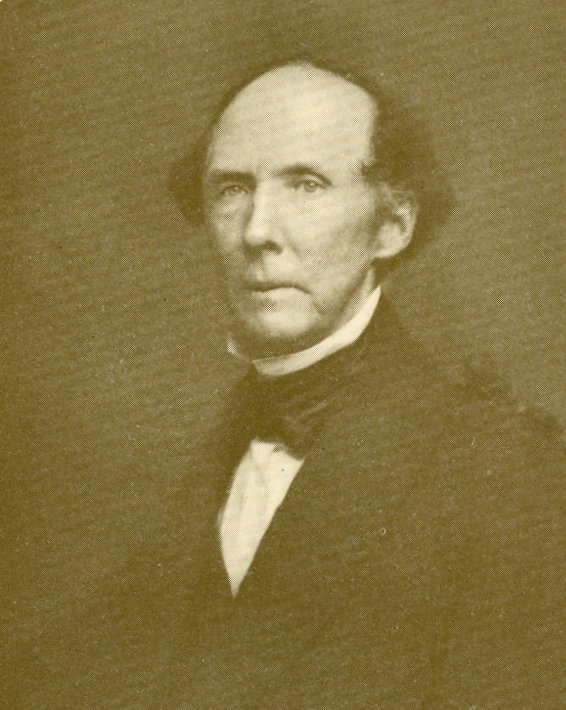
- Illustration from National Life Insurance Company of Montpelier, Vermont

18th Lieutenant Governor of Vermont
- In office 1852–1853
- Governor: Erastus Fairbanks
- Preceded by: Julius Converse
- Succeeded by: Jefferson P. Kidder

Member of the Vermont Senate from Rutland County
- In office 1838–1840 Serving with Robert Pierpoint, Obadiah Noble
- Preceded by: Robert Pierpoint, Thomas D. Hammond, Zimri Howe
- Succeeded by: Isaac Norton, Orson Clark, Anderson G. Dana

Speaker of the Vermont House of Representatives
- In office 1848–1850
- Preceded by: Solomon Foot
- Succeeded by: Thomas E. Powers

Member of the Vermont House of Representatives from Fair Haven
- In office 1856–1857
- Preceded by: Joseph Adams
- Succeeded by: Hiram Hamilton
- In office 1847–1850
- Preceded by: Jonathan Capen
- Succeeded by: Abram Graves
- In office 1837–1838
- Preceded by: Barnabas Ellis
- Succeeded by: Adams Dutton
- In office 1833–1834
- Preceded by: Tilly Gilbert
- Succeeded by: Barnabas Ellis
- In office 1831–1832
- Preceded by: John Jones
- Succeeded by: Tilly Gilbert

State's Attorney of Rutland County, Vermont
- In office 1848–1849
- Preceded by: Edgar L. Ormsbee
- Succeeded by: Ezra June
- In office 1843–1845
- Preceded by: Solomon Foot
- Succeeded by: Edgar L. Ormsbee

Assistant Judge of Rutland County, Vermont
- In office 1833–1839 Serving with Henry Hodges (1833), Nathan T. Sprague (1834–1839)
- Preceded by: Henry Hodges, John P. Colburn
- Succeeded by: Zimri Howe, Nathan T. Sprague

Personal details
- Born: February 23, 1800 Dalton, Massachusetts, US
- Died: June 11, 1869 (aged 69) Rutland, Vermont, US
- Party: Whig (before 1856); Republican
- Spouse(s): Maria Hatch (m. 1827); Harriet Newell Adams (m. 1831); Charlotte (Pomeroy) Button (m. 1838)
- Children: 12
- Education: Williams College
- Profession: Attorney; Businessman
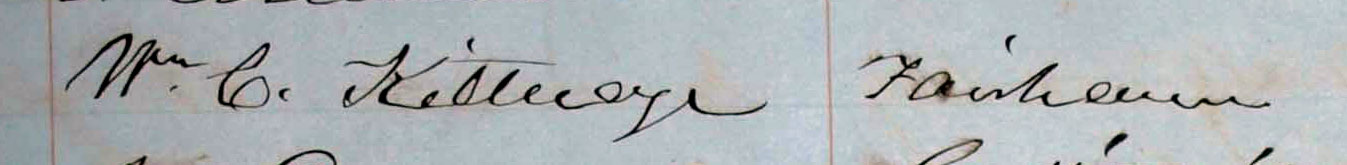
- Signature

William Cullen Kittredge (February 23, 1800 – June 11, 1869) was a Vermont lawyer and politician. He served as 18th lieutenant governor of Vermont from 1852 to 1853.

== Early life ==
William Cullen Kittredge was born in Dalton, Massachusetts, on February 23, 1800, the son of Dr. Abel Kittredge and Eunice (Chamberlain) Kittredge. He graduated Phi Beta Kappa from Williams College in 1821, received a master's degree from Williams in 1824, studied law with E. H. Mills and Lewis Strong of Northampton, and was admitted to the bar. He practiced in Kentucky and Ohio before settling in Fair Haven, Vermont, in 1824.

== Business and political career ==
In addition to practicing law, Kittredge was involved in several business ventures, including serving as the first President of National Life Insurance Company and owning a partnership in a successful marble company.

Kittredge served for eight years in the Vermont House of Representatives, including two as Speaker. He also served in the Vermont Senate and as Rutland County State's Attorney and Assistant Judge and Judge of the County Court. Kittredge was the successful Whig nominee for Lieutenant Governor in 1852 and served from 1852 to 1853.

== Death ==
After leaving office Kittredge continued to practice law in Fair Haven. He became a Republican when the party was founded in the mid 1850s. Kittredge died in Rutland, Vermont, on June 11, 1869, while en route to Bennington to assume the post of U.S. Internal Revenue Assessor. He was buried at West Street Cemetery in Fair Haven.

Party political offices
Preceded by Julius Converse	Whig nominee for Lieutenant Governor of Vermont; 1852, 1853	Succeeded by None
Political offices
Preceded by Solomon Foot	Speaker of the Vermont House of Representatives; 1848–1850	Succeeded by Thomas E. Powers
Preceded by Julius Converse	Lieutenant Governor of Vermont; 1852–1853	Succeeded by Jefferson P. Kidder
