= Solomon Foot =

American politician and attorney (1802–1866)

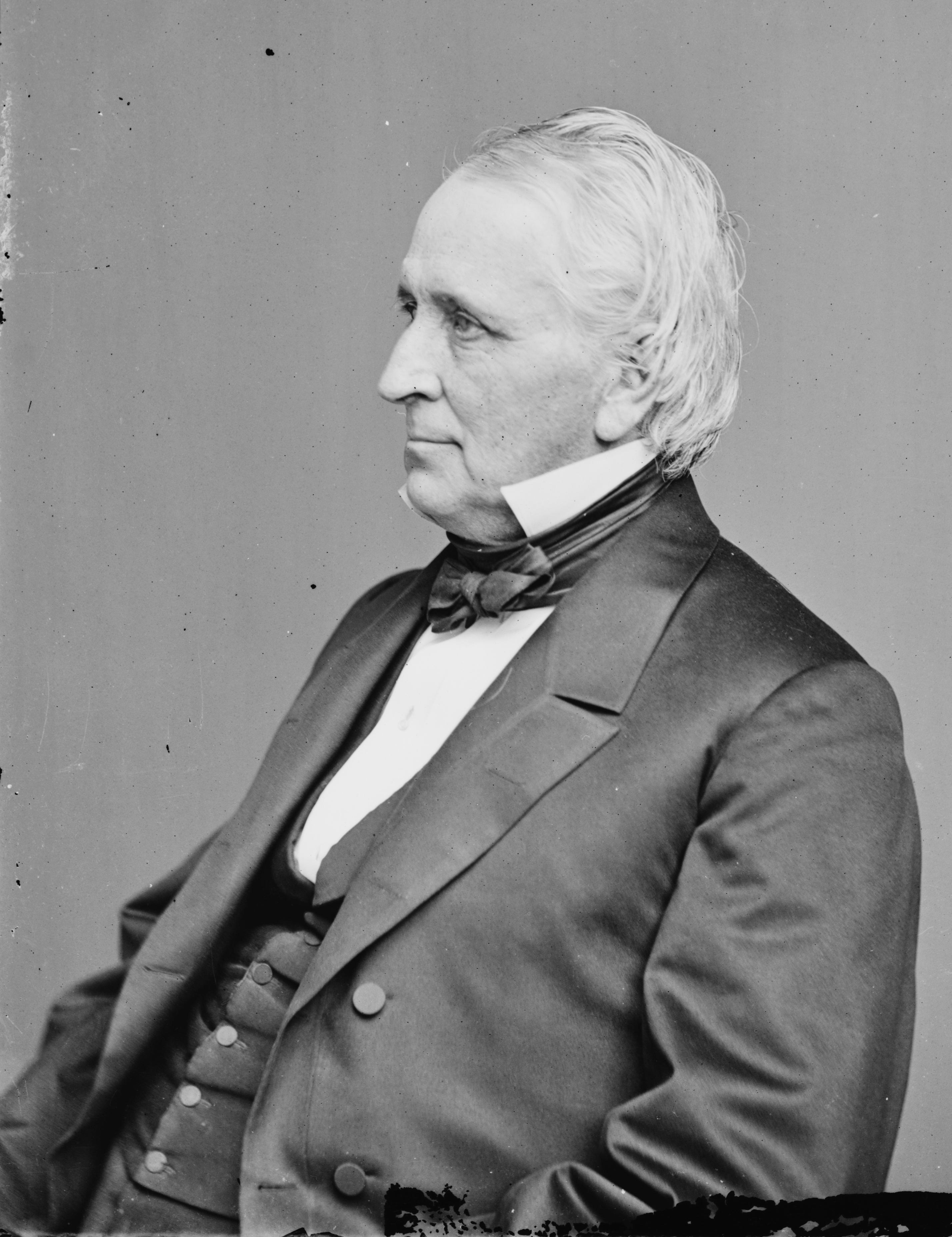
- Brady-Handy Photograph Collection, Library of Congress, circa 1860

President pro tempore of the United States Senate
- In office February 16, 1861 – April 13, 1864
- Preceded by: Benjamin Fitzpatrick
- Succeeded by: Daniel Clark
- In office March 4, 1851 – March 28, 1866
- Preceded by: Samuel S. Phelps
- Succeeded by: George F. Edmunds

Chairman of the Joint Congressional Committee on Public Buildings and Grounds
- In office 1861–1866
- Preceded by: Jesse D. Bright
- Succeeded by: B. Gratz Brown

Member of the United States House of Representatives from Vermont's 1st district
- In office March 4, 1843 – March 3, 1847
- Preceded by: Hiland Hall
- Succeeded by: William Henry

Speaker of the Vermont House of Representatives
- In office 1847–1848
- Preceded by: Ebenezer N. Briggs
- Succeeded by: William C. Kittredge
- In office 1837–1839
- Preceded by: Carlos Coolidge
- Succeeded by: Carlos Coolidge

State's Attorney of Rutland County, Vermont
- In office 1836–1842
- Preceded by: Reuben R. Thrall
- Succeeded by: William C. Kittredge

Member of the Vermont House of Representatives from Rutland
- In office 1847–1849
- Preceded by: Joel M. Mead
- Succeeded by: Edwin L. Griswold
- In office 1836–1839
- Preceded by: Ambrose L. Brown
- Succeeded by: George Tisdale Hodges
- In office 1833–1834
- Preceded by: Rodncy C. Royce
- Succeeded by: Ambrose L. Brown

Personal details
- Born: November 19, 1802 Cornwall, Vermont, US
- Died: March 28, 1866 (aged 63) Washington, D.C., US
- Resting place: Evergreen Cemetery, Rutland, Vermont
- Party: Whig (before 1854); Republican (from 1854)
- Spouse(s): Emily Fay Foot; Anna Dora Hodges Foot
- Children: Helen Eliza Foot
- Education: Middlebury College
- Profession: Teacher; Lawyer

Solomon T. Foot (November 19, 1802 – March 28, 1866) was an American politician and attorney. He held numerous offices during his career, including Speaker of the Vermont House of Representatives, State's Attorney for Rutland County, member of the United States House of Representatives, and United States Senator.

A native of Cornwall, Vermont, Foot began working on local farms at age nine, helping support his family after the death of his father. After graduating from Middlebury College, Foot worked as a teacher, school principal, and college professor while studying law. After attaining admission to the bar in 1831, he opened a practice in Rutland.

Entering politics as a Whig, Foot served in several offices, including member of the Vermont House of Representatives, delegate to the state constitutional conventions of 1833 and 1836, and Rutland County State's Attorney. He was Vermont's Speaker of the House from 1837 to 1839. Foot served in the United States House of Representatives from 1843 to 1847 and was noted for his opposition to the Mexican–American War and the extension of slavery. He did not run for reelection in 1846; returned to the Vermont House, he served as Speaker from 1847 to 1848.

In 1850 Foot was elected to the United States Senate; he became a Republican when the party was founded, and won reelection in 1856 and 1862. Foot served as President pro tempore of the United States Senate during the American Civil War, and was a strong advocate for the Union. He headed the Joint Congressional Committee on Public Buildings and Grounds beginning in 1861, and which included supervising completion of the United States Capitol's construction.

Foot died in Washington, D.C., in 1866; he was buried at Evergreen Cemetery in Rutland.

== Early life ==
Foot was born on November 19, 1802, in Cornwall, Vermont. He was the son of Dr. Solomon and Betsey Crossett Foot, and his family lived across the road from William Slade. Foot's father died when he was nine years old, and he worked on local farms to help support his family. He graduated from Middlebury College in 1826 and also received a master's degree from Middlebury.

He was a tutor in Middlebury and Burlington, preceptor of Castleton Academy, and professor of natural philosophy at the Vermont Medical School in Castleton.

While teaching he studied law with attorneys Benjamin F. Langdon and Reuben R. Thrall. Foot attained admission to the bar in 1831, afterwards practicing in Rutland.

== Start of career ==
Foot served in the Vermont House of Representatives in 1833 and was a Delegate to the Vermont State Constitutional Convention in 1836. He served again in the Vermont House from 1836 to 1839 and was Speaker from 1837 to 1839.

He served as Rutland County State's Attorney from 1836 to 1842.

== Congressman ==
Foot was elected to the United States House of Representatives as a Whig in 1842 and served two terms, 1843 to 1847. As a Congressman Foot opposed extending slavery and the Mexican–American War.

He declined renomination in 1846. Returned to the Vermont House of Representatives, Foot was again chosen to serve as Speaker, holding the post from 1847 to 1848.

== 1848 Whig Convention ==
Foot was a Delegate to the 1848 Whig National Convention, and was Chairman of the Vermont delegation. Abbott Lawrence of Massachusetts, who had worked diligently to obtain the Presidential nomination for Zachary Taylor, expected to be the Vice Presidential nominee, counting on the support of Thurlow Weed of New York and the southern delegates who had backed Taylor. Northern and border state delegates, who had backed Henry Clay or Daniel Webster for President, threatened to run a northern candidate in opposition to Taylor unless a northerner other than Lawrence—one seen as less willing to allow slavery—was selected for Vice President. They proposed Millard Fillmore of New York.

Other delegates promoted Fillmore because they opposed the efforts of Weed and William H. Seward to control the party in New York, and believed that Weed was working to install Seward as Secretary of State in a Taylor administration. They backed Fillmore for Vice President because in an era when the President, Vice President and cabinet were expected to reflect geographic balance, if Fillmore became Vice President, another New Yorker (Seward) could not be expected to claim a place in the cabinet.

Foot went to the convention as a supporter of Lawrence. Recognizing that the Whigs would likely collapse if Lawrence was nominated and northern delegates left the party, Foot agreed to support Fillmore. Lawrence's support eroded as other northern delegates followed Foot's lead, and on the first ballot, Fillmore had 115 votes and Lawrence 109. Fillmore won the nomination on the second ballot, and the ticket of Taylor and Fillmore went on to win the election.

== United States Senator ==
Foot was elected to the United States Senate as a Whig in 1850. He became a Republican at the party's founding and was reelected to the Senate in 1856 and 1862. He served from March 4, 1851, until his death.

In early 1861 Foot met the Vermont delegates to the Peace Conference which attempted to prevent the start of the American Civil War. At this meeting, he shared with them his view that the conference was a sham by secessionists who hoped to obtain additional time to plan for the withdrawal of their states from the Union.

Foot was also Chairman of the Senate committee responsible for the inauguration of Abraham Lincoln in 1861.

Foot served as the Senate's President pro tempore from 1861 to 1864. Because Vice President Hannibal Hamlin was often absent, Foot usually presided over the Senate during the war, and he was commended for his tact and fairness.

He was Chairman of the Joint Congressional Committee on Public Buildings and Grounds from 1861 until his death. In this capacity, he oversaw completion of construction on the United States Capitol.

== Death ==
Foot died in Washington, D.C., on March 28, 1866. Funeral services were held in the Chamber of the United States Senate. He is interred at Evergreen Cemetery, Rutland, Vermont.

== Honors ==
Foot was a Trustee of Middlebury College and the University of Vermont. He received an honorary LL.D. degree from Middlebury in 1857.

== Family ==
Foot was married in 1839 to Emily Fay of Rutland. They had one daughter, Helen Eliza Foot (1840–1841). Emily died on May 2, 1842.

In 1844, Foot married Mary A. (Hodges) Dana.

Foot's brother Jonathan (born October 31, 1804) graduated from Vermont Medical College in 1829. He settled in Whitby, Ontario, Canada, where he practiced medicine.

Solomon Foot's mother lived with him in Rutland until her death in 1845.

== See also ==
- List of members of the United States Congress who died in office (1790–1899)

== Gallery ==
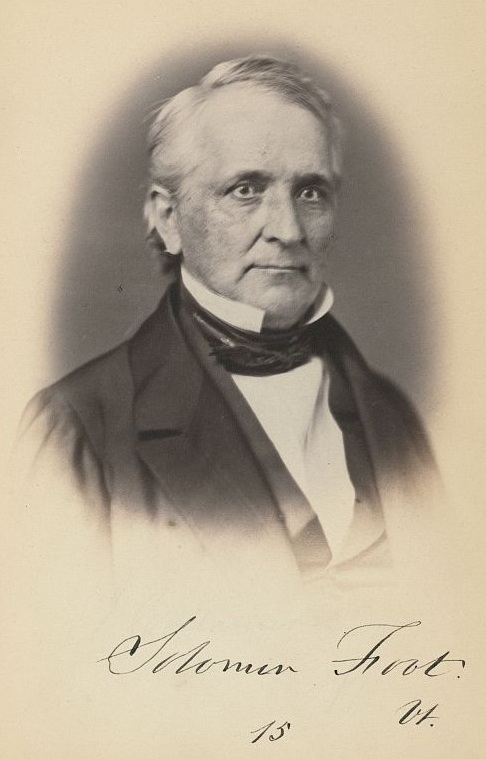
Solomon Foot as a U.S. Senator in 1859

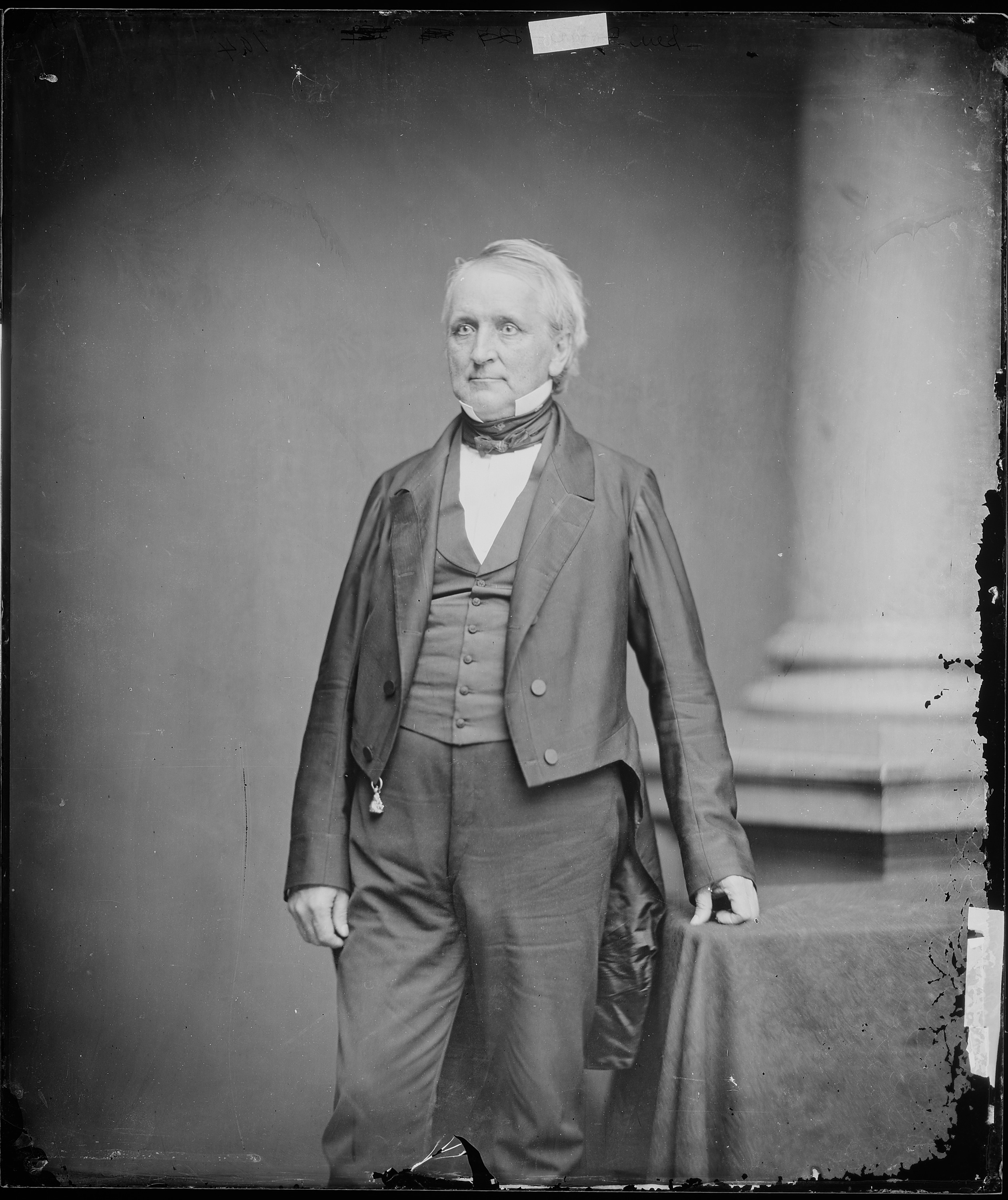
Photo by Mathew Brady

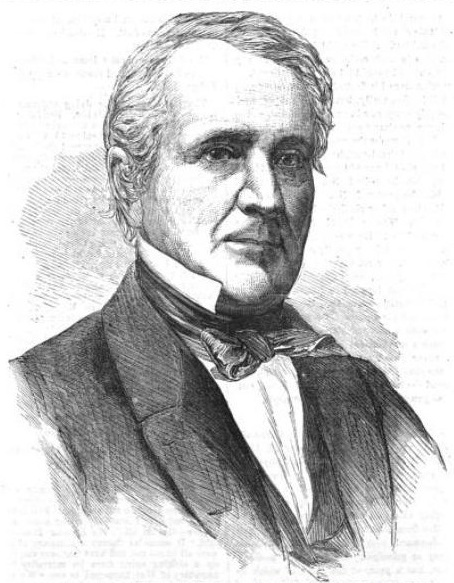
The American Phrenological Journal and Life Illustrated, June 1866.

Political offices
Preceded by Carlos Coolidge	Speaker of the Vermont House of Representatives; 1837–1839	Succeeded by Carlos Coolidge
Preceded by Ebenezer N. Briggs	Speaker of the Vermont House of Representatives; 1847–1848	Succeeded by William C. Kittredge
U.S. House of Representatives
Preceded by Hiland Hall	Member of the U.S. House of Representatives from Vermont's 1st congressional district March 4, 1843 – March 3, 1847	Succeeded by William Henry
U.S. Senate
Preceded by Samuel S. Phelps	U.S. senator (Class 1) from Vermont; March 4, 1851 – March 28, 1866; Served alongside: William Upham, Samuel S. Phelps, Lawrence Brainerd, Jacob Collamer and Luke P. Poland	Succeeded by George F. Edmunds
Political offices
Preceded by Benjamin Fitzpatrick	President pro tempore of the United States Senate; February 16, 1861 – April 13, 1864	Succeeded by Daniel Clark
