= Ebenezer Porter =

American minister and writer

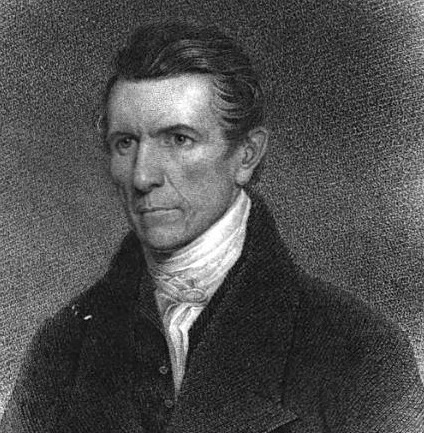

Ebenezer Porter (May 5, 1772 – April 8, 1834), D.D., was an American minister and writer.

== Early life and career ==
The son of Vermont politician and judge Thomas Porter, Ebenezer was born in Cornwall, Connecticut on May 5, 1772. He graduated from Dartmouth College in 1792, studied theology in Bethlehem, Connecticut, and in 1796 became pastor of the Congregational church in Washington, Connecticut.

In 1812 he was appointed professor of sacred rhetoric at Andover Theological Seminary, and he was appointed the academy's president in 1827, retaining both positions until his death.

In 1814 Dartmouth College awarded Porter an honorary Doctor of Divinity degree.

== Author ==
Porter published Young Preacher's Manual; Analysis of Vocal Inflections; Analysis of the Principles of Rhetorical Delivery; Rhetorical Reader and Exercises; and Lectures on Homilectics and Preaching, and on Public Prayer, with Sermons and Addresses. After his death, The Biblical Reader and Lectures on Eloquence and Style were also published.

Porter was also a contributor to the Quarterly Register, and a translator of many sacred German poems.

== Death and burial ==
Porter died in Andover, Massachusetts on April 8, 1834.
