= George F. Edmunds =

Republican U.S. Senator from Vermont

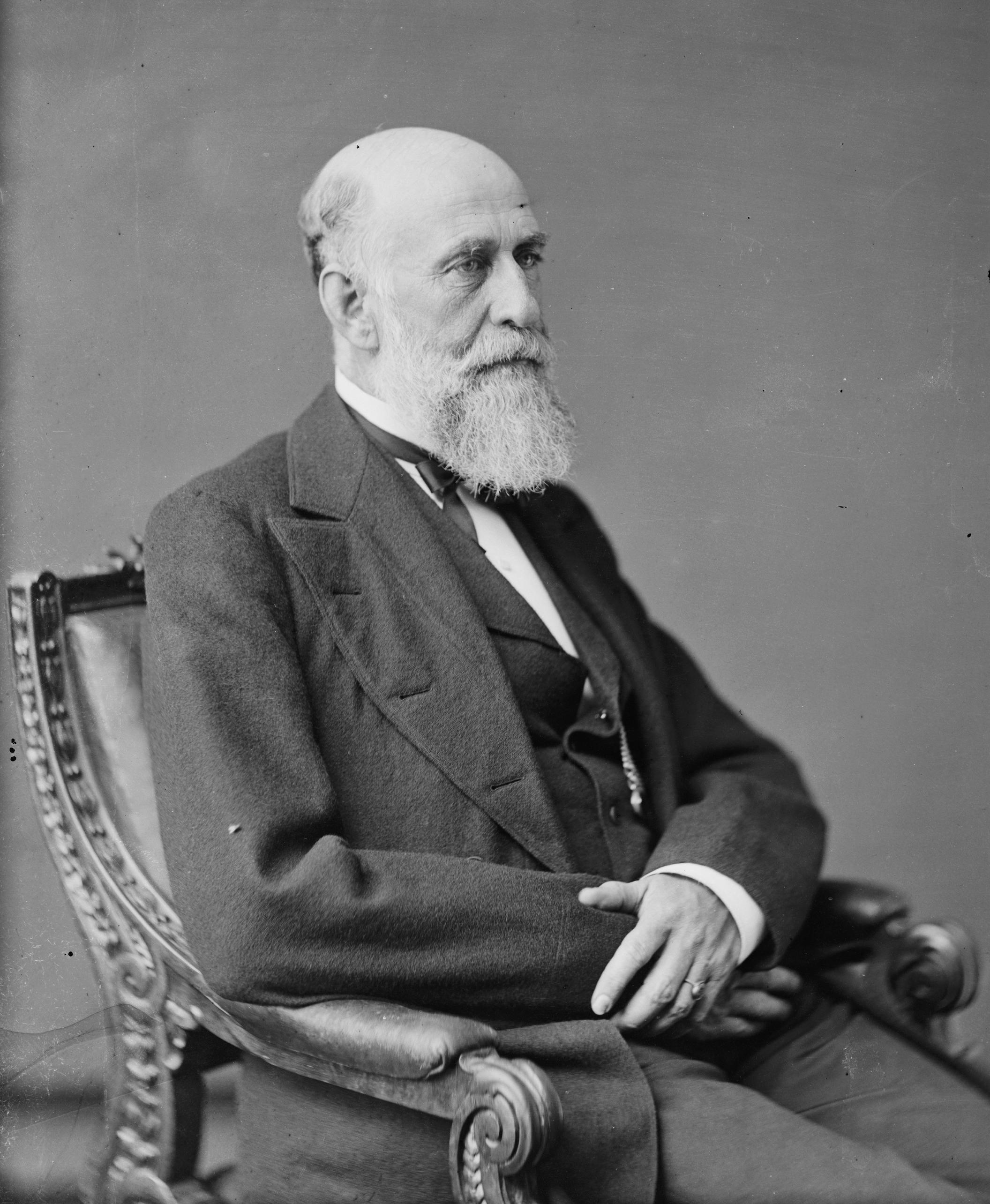
- Edmunds c. 1865–80

President pro tempore of the United States Senate
- In office March 3, 1883 – March 3, 1885
- Preceded by: David Davis
- Succeeded by: John Sherman

Chairman of the Senate Republican Conference
- In office December 1885 – November 1, 1891
- Preceded by: John Sherman
- Succeeded by: John Sherman

United States Senator from Vermont
- In office April 3, 1866 – November 1, 1891
- Preceded by: Solomon Foot
- Succeeded by: Redfield Proctor

President pro tempore of the Vermont State Senate
- In office 1861–1862
- Preceded by: Frederick E. Woodbridge
- Succeeded by: Henry E. Stoughton

Member of the Vermont Senate from Chittenden County
- In office 1861–1863 Serving with John H. Woodward, Elmer Beecher, Jed P. Clark, A. C. Welch
- Preceded by: John H. Woodward, Asahel Peck, Elmer Beecher
- Succeeded by: Leverett B. Englesby, Amos Hobart, A. J. Crane

Speaker of the Vermont House of Representatives
- In office 1857–1860
- Preceded by: George W. Grandey
- Succeeded by: Augustus P. Hunton

Member of the Vermont House of Representatives from Burlington
- In office 1854–1860
- Preceded by: Edward C. Palmer
- Succeeded by: Carlous Noyes

Personal details
- Born: George Franklin Edmunds; February 1, 1828 Richmond, Vermont, U.S.
- Died: February 27, 1919 (aged 91) Pasadena, California, U.S.
- Resting place: Green Mount Cemetery, Burlington, Vermont
- Party: Republican
- Spouse: Susan Marsh Edmunds
- Profession: Lawyer

George Franklin Edmunds (February 1, 1828 – February 27, 1919) was an American attorney and Republican politician who represented the state of Vermont in the United States Senate from 1866 to 1891. He was a candidate for the Republican presidential nomination in 1880 and in 1884, as a leading representative of New England and of the faction favoring civil service reform.

Edmunds was born in Richmond, Vermont, and began to study law while still a teenager; he proved an adept student, and was admitted to the bar as soon as he reached the minimum required age of 21. He practiced in Burlington and became active in local politics and government. Before entering the Senate, he served in a number of high-profile positions in state government, including Speaker of the Vermont House of Representatives and President pro tempore of the Vermont State Senate.

Edmunds was appointed to the U.S. Senate in 1866, filling the vacancy caused by the death of Solomon Foot. He was subsequently elected by the Vermont General Assembly, and reelected in 1868, 1874, 1880, and 1886 before resigning in November 1891. As a longtime member of the U.S. Senate, he served in a variety of leadership posts, including chairman of the committees on Pensions, the Judiciary, Private Land Claims, and Foreign Relations. He was also the leader of the Senate Republicans as President pro tempore of the Senate and chairman of the Republican Conference. Edmunds was an unsuccessful candidate for president at the 1880 and 1884 Republican National Conventions.

After leaving the Senate, Edmunds practiced law in Philadelphia. He later lived in retirement in Pasadena, California, where he died in 1919. He was buried at Green Mount Cemetery in Burlington, Vermont.

== Early life ==
George F. Edmunds was born in Richmond, Vermont, on February 1, 1828, the son of Ebenezer Edmunds and Naomi (Briggs) Edmunds. He attended the local schools and was privately tutored. Edmunds began studying law as a teenager, spending time in both the office of his brother-in-law Aaron B. Maynard and the office of David A. Smalley and Edward J. Phelps. He was admitted to the bar as soon as he was eligible in 1849. He practiced in Burlington, and became active in politics by serving in local offices including Town Meeting Moderator. During his time practicing law, one of the students who studied under him was Russell S. Taft, who later served as Lieutenant Governor and as Chief Justice of the Vermont Supreme Court.

A Republican, he was elected to the Vermont House of Representatives in 1854. He served until 1860, and was Speaker from 1857 to 1860. He moved to the Vermont Senate in 1861, where he served until 1862. While in the State Senate, Edmunds was chosen to serve as President pro tempore.

== United States Senate ==
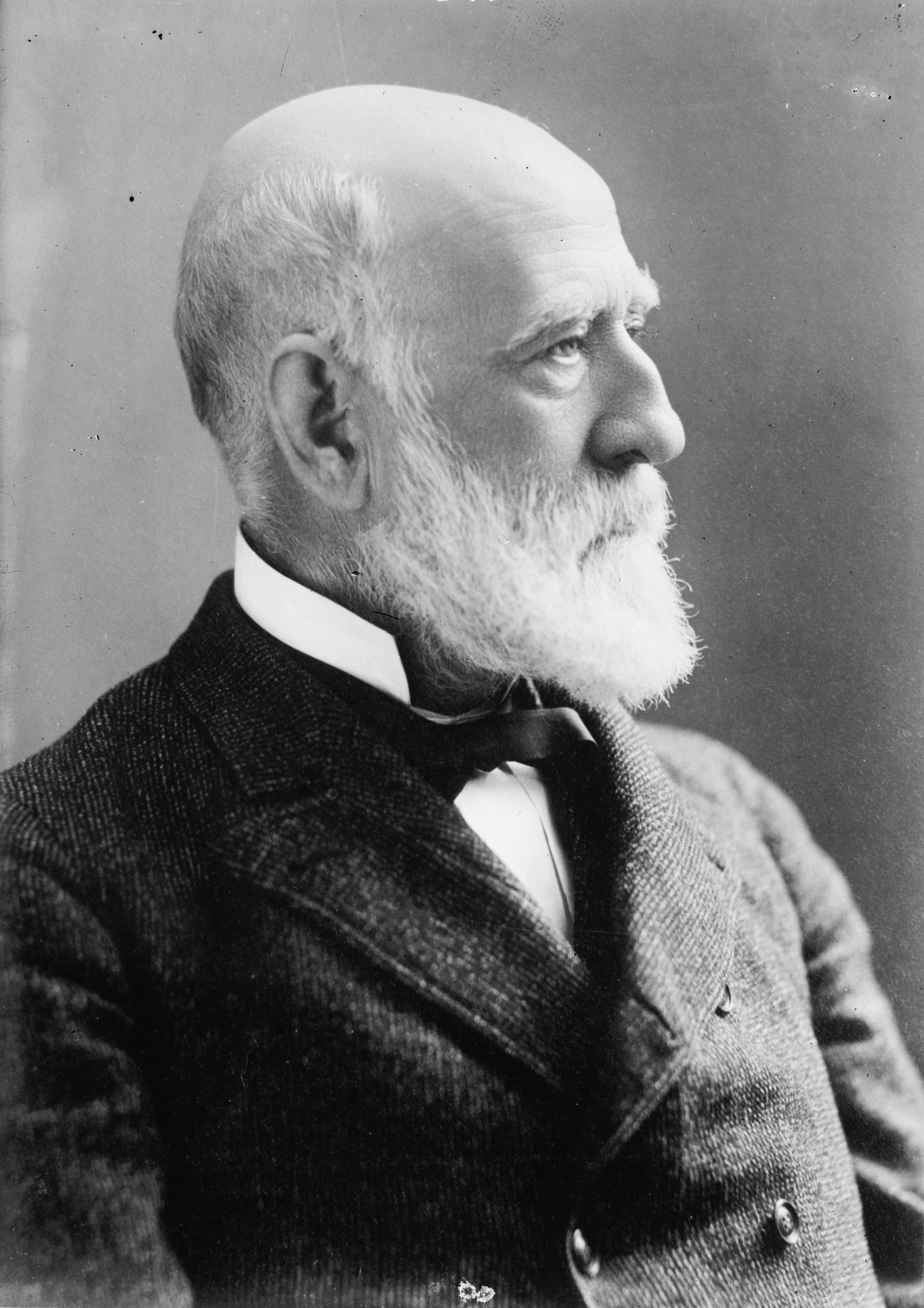

After the death of U.S. Senator Solomon Foot in March 1866, Governor Paul Dillingham was expected to appoint someone from the west side of the Green Mountains, in keeping with the Republican Party's Mountain Rule. He first considered former Governor J. Gregory Smith. When Smith indicated that he would not accept, Dillingham turned to Edmunds, who had favorably impressed Dillingham during their service together in the State Senate, and whose residence in Burlington was on the west side of the state. Edmunds subsequently won reelection in 1868, 1874, 1880 and 1886, and served from April 1866 until resigning in November 1891.

In the Senate, Edmunds took an active part in the attempt to impeach President Andrew Johnson in 1868, having helped pass the Tenure of Office Act to rebuke Johnson.

Although considering himself devoted to the principles of the Republican Party, like most congressional "Half-Breeds", Edmunds staunchly supported civil service reform. This was opposed by the conservative "Stalwart" faction, who supported maintaining the spoils system as a way to reward political supporters and punish political enemies.

Edmunds was influential in providing for the electoral commission to decide the disputed presidential election of 1876 and served as one of the commissioners, voting for Republicans Rutherford B. Hayes and William A. Wheeler.

He was the author of the Edmunds Act against polygamy in Utah, and the Sherman Antitrust Act to limit monopolies.

In 1882, President Chester A. Arthur nominated Senator Roscoe Conkling to replace the retiring Ward Hunt as an Associate Justice of the United States Supreme Court. When Conkling declined, Arthur chose Edmunds, who also declined. The appointment ultimately went to Samuel Blatchford.

=== Senate leadership positions ===
Edmunds served as chairman of the Committee on Pensions from 1869 to 1873, the Committee on the Judiciary from 1872 to 1879 and again from 1881 to 1891, the Committee on Private Land Claims from 1879 to 1881 and the Committee on Foreign Relations in 1881. He was President pro tempore of the Senate from 1883 to 1885 and chairman of the Republican Conference from 1885 to 1891.

=== Reputation in the Senate ===
While serving in Congress he continued to practice law, as did many other members of Congress at the time. He held retainers from railroads and other corporations, including those which could be affected by Senate action. In 1921, former Senator Richard F. Pettigrew published an autobiography in which he condemned Edmunds as a "senatorial bribe-taker" and "distinctly dishonest" for having accepted corporate retainers while a senator.

An acerbic debater, he often favored the status quo or slow progress. He was known for making his colleagues feel the sting of his criticisms, and some thought him better at merely opposing than offering constructive alternatives. David Davis joked that he could make Edmunds vote against any measure by simply phrasing the request for votes in the New England town meeting way: "Contrary-minded will say no." One friend trying to interest him in a presidential bid pleaded, "But, Edmunds, think how much fun you would have vetoing bills."

Edmunds took special delight in goading Southern senators into blurting out statements that would embarrass the Democratic Party. To those Southerners opposed to any federal role in protecting blacks' right to vote, Edmunds seemed the epitome of Yankee evil. One Southern correspondent in 1880 wrote, "When I look at that man sitting almost alone in the Senate, isolated in his gloom of hate and bitterness, stern, silent, watchful, suspicious and pitiless, I am reminded of the worst types of Puritan character... You see the impress of the purer persecuting spirit that burned witches, drove out Roger Williams, hounded Jonathan Edwards for doing his sacred duty, maligned Jefferson, and like a toad squatted at the ear of the Constitution it had failed to pervert."

==== Friendship with Allen G. Thurman ====
In spite of contempt from many Democratic colleagues, Edmunds formed friendships across the aisle. One Democrat with no reason to appreciate him wrote a colleague that among all the Republicans, "Edmunds made the most impression upon me. I couldn't help admiring his clear and incisive way of putting a question, although it appeared to me that his manner is occasionally very irritating. This manner of his is very much that of a lawyer employed as counsel in a case, who therefore makes ex parte statements, and thinks it fair to make all manner of allegations." His closest friend in the chamber for many years was the ranking Democrat on the Judiciary Committee, Allen G. Thurman of Ohio.

Edmunds and Thurman shared similar reformist attitudes. When Edmunds ran for president in 1884, the other candidates included the eventual Republican nominee, James G. Blaine, a Half-Breed. During the campaign, Edmunds touted his alliance with Thurman, which in turn was cited as a positive quality by cartoonist Thomas Nast, an anti-Blaine Mugwump and illustrator for Harper's Weekly. At Thurman's death in 1895, Edmunds spoke highly of the former Ohio senator as "brave in his convictions".

== Presidential campaigns ==
=== 1880 campaign ===
Edmunds was a candidate for president at the 1880 Republican National Convention. Nominated by Frederick H. Billings, he received 34 votes on the first ballot, carrying Vermont and Massachusetts. His support remained at 31 or 32 votes through the 29th ballot, after which his supporters began to trend towards eventual nominee James A. Garfield.

=== 1884 campaign ===
In 1884, Republicans who favored civil service reform, including Carl Schurz, George William Curtis, Theodore Roosevelt and Henry Cabot Lodge, supported Edmunds for President over incumbent President Chester A. Arthur and former Senator James G. Blaine, hoping to build a groundswell for Edmunds if the two stronger candidates deadlocked.

Revelations about Edmunds's legal work for railroads and corporations while sitting in the Senate prevented Edmunds from attaining wide support from reformers. On the first ballot he received 93 votes, once again carrying Vermont and Massachusetts, along with Rhode Island, a significant minority in New York, and scattered delegates from throughout the West. His support declined, however, and the nomination went to Blaine on the fourth ballot.

After the convention, many Edmunds supporters backed Democratic nominee Grover Cleveland, earning them the nickname "Mugwumps". Edmunds himself refused support for Blaine, who ultimately narrowly lost the general election.

Although Blaine was the leader of the Half-Breeds, he was viewed with suspicion and distrust by Edmunds, who believed that a true Half-Breed must support civil service reform. Indeed, Blaine's inclinations in the late 1870s were closer to that of the Stalwarts, evident in his hostility towards civil service reform and the policies pursued by Half-Breed Rutherford B. Hayes.

During the campaign, Edmunds stated:

It is my deliberate opinion that Senator Blaine acts as the attorney of Jay Gould. Whenever [Allen G. Thurman] and I have settled upon legislation to bring the Pacific Railroad to terms of equity with the government, up has jumped Mr. James G. Blaine musket in hand, from behind the breastworks of Jay Gould’s lobby to fire in our faces.

=== 1886 re-election ===
Edmunds' refusal to support Blaine consequentially led to immense opposition from Republicans who pushed to deny him re-election in the 1886 midterms. A supporter of Blaine said of the Vermont senator:

Do you believe, [Edmunds] sulked during the campaign of 1884, and refused to assist the party that gave him all the eminence he ever had as a statesman, and thereby on account of his personal dislike to James G. Blaine refused to contribute his support. . . There are honest, intelligent Republicans who believe he is guilty.

— Blaine supporter Daniel Tarbell

When the 1886 US Senate election drew closer, newspapers covering the race became either increasingly pro or anti Edmunds. The Vermont Watchman, which was noted for defending his stance on Blaine in 1884, changed direction and harshly attacked Edmunds. A number of smaller papers split, and the Burlington Free Press affirmed its support for Edmunds.

Blaine had strong contempt for Edmunds, and Blaine supporters likely financed the movement to oust Edmunds. Despite Blaine's efforts, Edmunds easily retained his seat, winning reelection with 227 votes to 29 for Democrat W. H. H. Bingham and 8 anti-Edmunds protest votes for Republican Wheelock G. Veazey.

At Arthur's funeral in 1886, Edmunds extended his hand to Blaine. Blaine, recalling the 1884 campaign, refused to shake it.

== Senate resignation, retirement and death ==
Edmunds resigned from the Senate in 1891 in order to start a law practice in Philadelphia, Pennsylvania.

He later retired to Pasadena, California, where he died on February 27, 1919. He was buried at Green Mount Cemetery in Burlington, Vermont.

== Family ==
In 1852 Edmunds married Susan Marsh Lyman (1831–1916), a niece of George Perkins Marsh. They had two daughters.

== Awards and honors ==
Among Edmunds's honors were an honorary Master of Arts from the University of Vermont and honorary LL.D. degrees from Middlebury College, Dartmouth College and the University of Vermont. He was elected to the American Philosophical Society in 1895.

== Legacy ==
Edmunds Elementary and Middle Schools in Burlington, which share a complex, opened as the city's high school in 1900 on land donated by Edmunds, and became a middle and elementary grades facility in 1964.

Mount Rainier's Edmunds Glacier and the town of Edmonds, Washington (despite the spelling), are named for him.

The Vermont Historical Society maintains the George F. Edmunds Fund, which awards an annual prize for student research and writing on Vermont history.

His birthplace in Richmond, Vermont, is a privately owned residence and farm, and marked by a Vermont Historic Sites Commission sign.

== See also ==
- Edmunds–Tucker Act

Political offices
Preceded by George W. Grandey	Speaker of the Vermont House of Representatives; 1857–1860	Succeeded by Augustus P. Hunton
Preceded by Frederick E. Woodbridge	President pro tempore of the Vermont State Senate; 1861–1862	Succeeded by Henry E. Stoughton
U.S. Senate
Preceded by Solomon Foot	U.S. senator (Class 1) from Vermont; April 3, 1866 – November 1, 1891; Served alongside: Luke P. Poland and Justin S. Morrill	Succeeded by Redfield Proctor
Political offices
Preceded by David Davis	President pro tempore of the United States Senate; March 4, 1883 – March 3, 1885	Succeeded by John Sherman
Preceded by John Sherman	Chairman of the Republican Conference of the United States Senate; 1885–1891	Succeeded by John Sherman
Honorary titles
Preceded by William Sprague	Most senior living U.S. senator (Sitting or former); September 11, 1915 – February 27, 1919	Succeeded by Cornelius Cole
