= Charles Herbert Joyce =

American lawyer and politician (1830–1916)

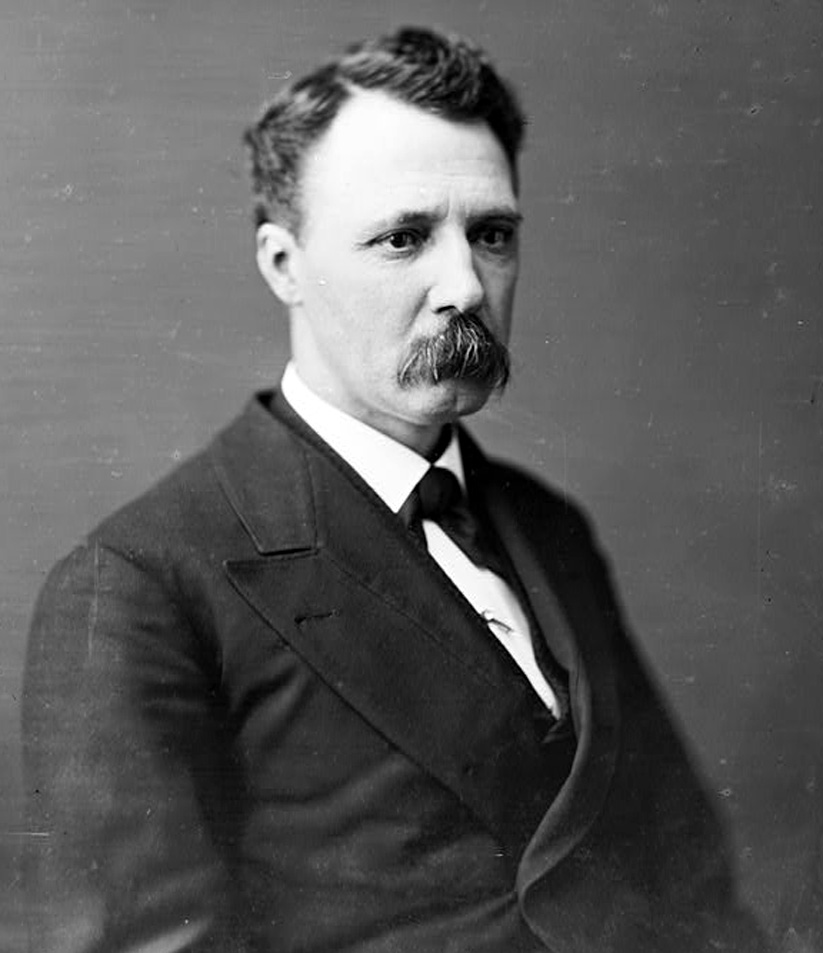
- Joyce, 1865–1880

Member of the United States House of Representatives from Vermont's 1st district
- In office March 4, 1875 – March 3, 1883
- Preceded by: Charles W. Willard
- Succeeded by: John Wolcott Stewart

Speaker of the Vermont House of Representatives
- In office 1870–1872
- Preceded by: George W. Grandey
- Succeeded by: Franklin Fairbanks

Member of the Vermont House of Representatives from Rutland
- In office 1869–1872
- Preceded by: Redfield Proctor
- Succeeded by: Zacheus V. K. Willson

Personal details
- Born: January 30, 1830 near Andover, Hampshire, England, U.K.
- Died: November 22, 1916 (aged 86) Pittsfield, Vermont, U.S.
- Resting place: Evergreen Cemetery, Rutland, Vermont, U.S.
- Party: Republican
- Spouse: Rouene M. Randall
- Children: 3
- Education: Newbury Seminary
- Profession: Lawyer

Military service
- Allegiance: United States (Union)
- Branch/service: Union Army
- Years of service: 1861–1863
- Rank: Lieutenant Colonel
- Unit: 2nd Vermont Infantry Regiment
- Battles/wars: American Civil War

Charles Herbert Joyce (January 30, 1830 – November 22, 1916) was an American lawyer and politician. He served as a U.S. representative from Vermont.

== Biography ==
Joyce was born near Andover, Hampshire, England to Charles Joyce and Martha E. Grist Joyce. At the age of six, in 1836, he immigrated to the United States with his parents, who settled in Waitsfield, Vermont.

He attended Waitsfield Academy and Northfield Academy before entering Newbury Seminary. He was a page in the Vermont House of Representatives for three sessions. While studying law with Francis V. Randall, John L. Buck, and Ferrand F. Merrill, Joyce taught school to support himself. He was admitted to the bar in 1852. He began the practice of law in Northfield, Vermont in 1855.

Joyce spent one year as assistant state librarian, then two years as the state librarian. He served as the State's Attorney of Washington County in 1857 and 1858.

When the American Civil War broke out, he served in the Union Army as major and lieutenant colonel of the Second Vermont Volunteers. After the war he resumed his legal practice in Rutland, Vermont and entered politics, serving as a member of the Vermont House of Representatives from 1869 until 1872. He was the speaker from 1870 and 1872.

Joyce was elected as a Republican candidate to the Forty-fourth Congress and to the three succeeding Congresses, serving from March 4, 1875, until March 3, 1883. He was not a candidate for renomination in 1882. After leaving office he again resumed his legal practice in Rutland, Vermont.

He retired from his legal practice in 1895. Joyce resided in Pittsfield, Vermont until his death on November 22, 1916. He is interred in Evergreen Cemetery in Rutland, Vermont.

== Personal life ==
Joyce was married to Rouene Randall, the sister of Francis V. Randall. They had three children: Inez Rouene Joyce, Grace Randall Joyce, and Charles P.F. Joyce.

== See also ==
U.S. House of Representatives
Preceded by Charles W. Willard	Member of the U.S. House of Representatives from Vermont's 1st congressional district March 4, 1875 – March 3, 1883	Succeeded by John W. Stewart
