= Thomas Porter (Vermont politician) =

American judge

Judge of the Rutland County, Vermont Court
- In office 1787–1789
- Preceded by: Increase Moseley
- Succeeded by: Ebenezer Marvin

Judge of the Vermont Supreme Court
- In office 1783–1785
- Preceded by: Jonas Fay
- Succeeded by: None (position eliminated)

Member of the Vermont Governor's Council
- In office 1782–1795
- Preceded by: Bezaleel Woodward
- Succeeded by: Samuel Williams

Assistant Judge of the Rutland County, Vermont Court
- In office 1781–1782
- Preceded by: None (position created)
- Succeeded by: William Ward

Speaker of the Vermont House of Representatives
- In office 1780–1782
- Preceded by: Samuel Robinson
- Succeeded by: Increase Moseley

Member of the Vermont House of Representatives
- In office 1780–1782
- Preceded by: Charles Brewster
- Succeeded by: Ebenezer Marvin
- Constituency: Tinmouth

Personal details
- Born: February 15, 1734 Farmington, Connecticut Colony
- Died: May 30, 1833 (aged 99) Granville, New York, US
- Resting place: Sawyer Cemetery, Tinmouth, Vermont, US
- Spouse: Abigail Howe (m. 1758–1812)
- Children: 7 (including Ebenezer Porter)
- Occupation: Farmer

Military service
- Allegiance: United States
- Service: Connecticut Militia
- Years of service: 1761–1779
- Rank: Captain
- Commands: Cornwall Company
- Wars: American Revolutionary War

Thomas Porter (February 15, 1734 – May 30, 1833) was a Connecticut and Vermont military and political figure who served as Speaker of the Vermont House of Representatives.

== Biography ==
Thomas Porter was born in Farmington, Connecticut Colony, in what is now the United States, on February 15, 1734, and became a farmer in Cornwall. He served with the British during the French and Indian War and held several local offices, including member of the Connecticut House of Representatives.

Porter served in the Connecticut Militia from 1761 through the early years of the American Revolution and advanced to command of the Cornwall Company with the rank of captain. He relocated to Tinmouth, Vermont in 1779.

In 1780 Porter was elected to the Vermont House of Representatives. He served until 1782 and was Speaker of the House during his entire House tenure.

Porter resigned as Speaker to accept election to the Governor's Council, on which he served until 1795.

From 1781 to 1782 Porter was Assistant Judge of the Rutland County Court, and he was the court's Chief Judge from 1788 to 1789.

In 1783 Porter became a Judge on the Vermont Supreme Court, serving until 1785.

He died in Granville, New York on May 30, 1833. Porter was buried at Sawyer Cemetery in Tinmouth.

Porter was the father of college president and theologian Ebenezer Porter.

Political offices
Preceded by Samuel Robinson	Speaker of the Vermont House of Representatives; 1780–1782	Succeeded by Increase Moseley
