= Increase Moseley =

American politician (1712–1795)

Increase Moseley (May 18, 1712 – May 2, 1795) was a Connecticut and Vermont government official who served as Speaker of the Vermont House of Representatives.

== Biography ==
Increase Moseley was born in Norwich, Connecticut on May 18, 1712. He studied medicine and became a medical doctor in Woodbury.

Moseley served in the Connecticut House of Representatives almost continuously from 1751 until he moved to Vermont, although the exact length of his service cannot be determined because his son Increase Moseley Jr. (1740 – 1811) also served in the legislature and the rolls do not differentiate between the two.

At the start of the American Revolution Moseley was active on several committees formed to coordinate the activities of the colonists, including the Connecticut committee formed to aid Boston, Massachusetts during the British occupation at the start of the war.

In 1779 Moseley moved to Clarendon, Vermont. In 1780 he was named a Judge of the Rutland County Court, serving until 1781. In 1780, Moseley also served as an Associate Justice of the Vermont Supreme Court.

In 1782 he was elected to the Vermont House of Representatives, serving until 1783 and holding the position of House Speaker.

Moseley returned to the judgeship of the Rutland County Court in 1782 and served until 1787.

In 1785 Moseley served as President of Vermont's first Council of Censors, the body charged with reviewing the actions of the executive and legislative branches every seven years to ensure compliance with the Vermont Constitution.

Moseley died in Clarendon on May 12, 1795.

Political offices
| Preceded by Thomas Porter | Speaker of the Vermont House of Representatives; 1782–1783 | Succeeded by Isaac Tichenor |
