= Thomas E. Powers =

American politician (1808–1876)

Thomas E. Powers (November 14, 1808 – December 27, 1876) was a Vermont medical doctor, newspaper editor and politician who served as Speaker of the Vermont House of Representatives and President pro tempore of the Vermont Senate.

== Biography ==
Thomas E. Powers was born in Woodstock, Vermont on November 14, 1808. He attended Castleton Medical College for two years before continuing to study at Dartmouth College, from which he graduated in 1827.

Powers practiced in Hartland and Woodstock before abandoning medicine for other pursuits. Active in politics as a Whig and an advocate of the Temperance movement, Powers edited newspapers dedicated to both causes.

From 1846 to 1849, Powers served as Assistant Secretary of the Vermont Senate.

Powers served several terms in the Vermont House of Representatives in the 1850s, and was Speaker from 1850 to 1853.

In 1857, Powers was appointed superintendent of the construction of the Vermont State House, erecting the current building to replace one destroyed by fire.

Powers served in the Vermont Senate during the American Civil War, and was appointed President pro tempore in 1861.

In 1862, Powers was appointed federal revenue assessor for southern Vermont, and he served until 1871.

Powers died in Woodstock on December 27, 1876. He was buried in Woodstock's River Street Cemetery.

The Thomas E. Powers House at 2 Church Street in Woodstock was built in 1825. As of 2011 the St. James Episcopal Church of Woodstock was considering purchasing it for use as a rectory.

Political offices
| Preceded by William C. Kittredge | Speaker of the Vermont House of Representatives; 1850–1853 | Succeeded by Horatio Needham |
| Preceded by Frederick E. Woodbridge | President pro tempore of the Vermont State Senate; 1861–1861 | Succeeded by Henry E. Stoughton |
