= Samuel Robinson (Vermont politician) =

American politician

Samuel Robinson, Jr. (August 15, 1738 – May 3, 1813) was an early Vermont political and military leader who served an officer in the American Revolution and as Speaker of the Vermont House of Representatives.

== Biography ==
Samuel Robinson was born in Hardwick, Massachusetts, on August 15, 1738. He was the son of Samuel Robinson, Sr. (1707–1767), one of Vermont's earliest white settlers. Samuel Robinson's brothers included Moses Robinson, David Robinson, and Jonathan Robinson. At the age of 17 he served in his father's company of militia during the French and Indian War.

The younger Robinson succeeded his father as one of Bennington's agents who attempted to resolve the dispute between New York and New Hampshire over control of colonial Vermont.

During the American Revolution Robinson was active in the militia, commanding a company at the Battle of Bennington and rising to the rank of colonel. In 1777 and 1778 Robinson served as custodian of Loyalist prisoners.

Samuel Robinson was a member of Vermont's Board of War and was one of the first Justices of the Peace appointed in Vermont. As Judge for the court with jurisdiction over southern Bennington County, in 1778 Robinson presided over the trial of David Redding, who had been accused of stealing a horse. Redding was prosecuted by Ethan Allen, and was convicted and executed by hanging.

Robinson served in the Vermont House of Representatives from 1779 to 1780, serving as Speaker in 1780.

Robinson died in Bennington on May 3, 1813, and is buried in Bennington's Old Cemetery.

Political offices
Preceded by Thomas Chandler, Jr.	Speaker of the Vermont House of Representatives; 1780–1780	Succeeded by Thomas Porter
