= 1848 Vermont gubernatorial election =

- September 5, 1848
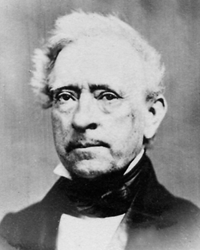

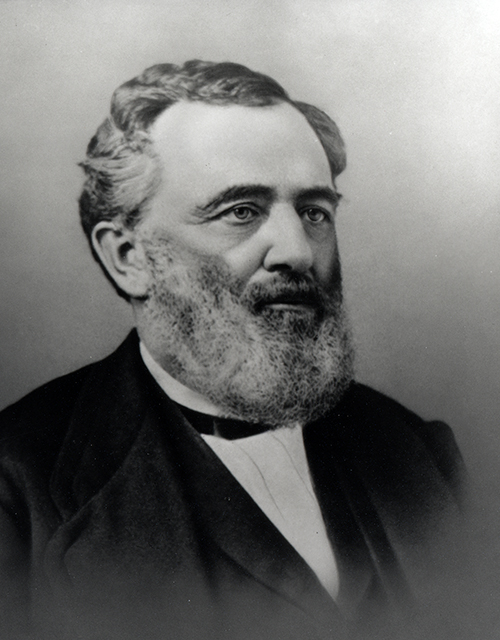

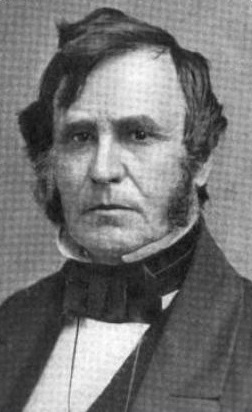
Nominee	Carlos Coolidge	Oscar L. Shafter	Paul Dillingham
Party	Whig	Free Soil	Democratic
Electoral vote	122	65	54
Popular vote	22,007	14,931	13,420
Percentage	43.66%	29.62%	26.62%
- County results Coolidge: 40–50% 50–60% Shafter: 40–50% Dillingham: 30–40% 40–50%
Governor before election
Horace Eaton
Whig
Elected Governor
Carlos Coolidge
Whig

The 1848 Vermont gubernatorial election took place on September 5, 1848, to elect the governor of Vermont. As no candidate received a majority of the votes cast, the Vermont General Assembly elected Whig Carlos Coolidge, the plurality winner, with 122 votes to 65 for Oscar L. Shafter, 54 for Paul Dillingham, and 1 each for Luke P. Poland and William M. Shafter.

== Results ==
1848 Vermont gubernatorial election
Party	Candidate	Votes	%	±%
Whig	Carlos Coolidge	22,007	43.66%	
Free Soil	Oscar L. Shafter	14,931	29.62%	
Democratic	Paul Dillingham	13,420	26.62%	
Write-in	Other	47	0.09%	
Total votes		50,405	100.00%	
