= 1870 Vermont gubernatorial election =

- September 6, 1870
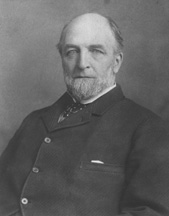

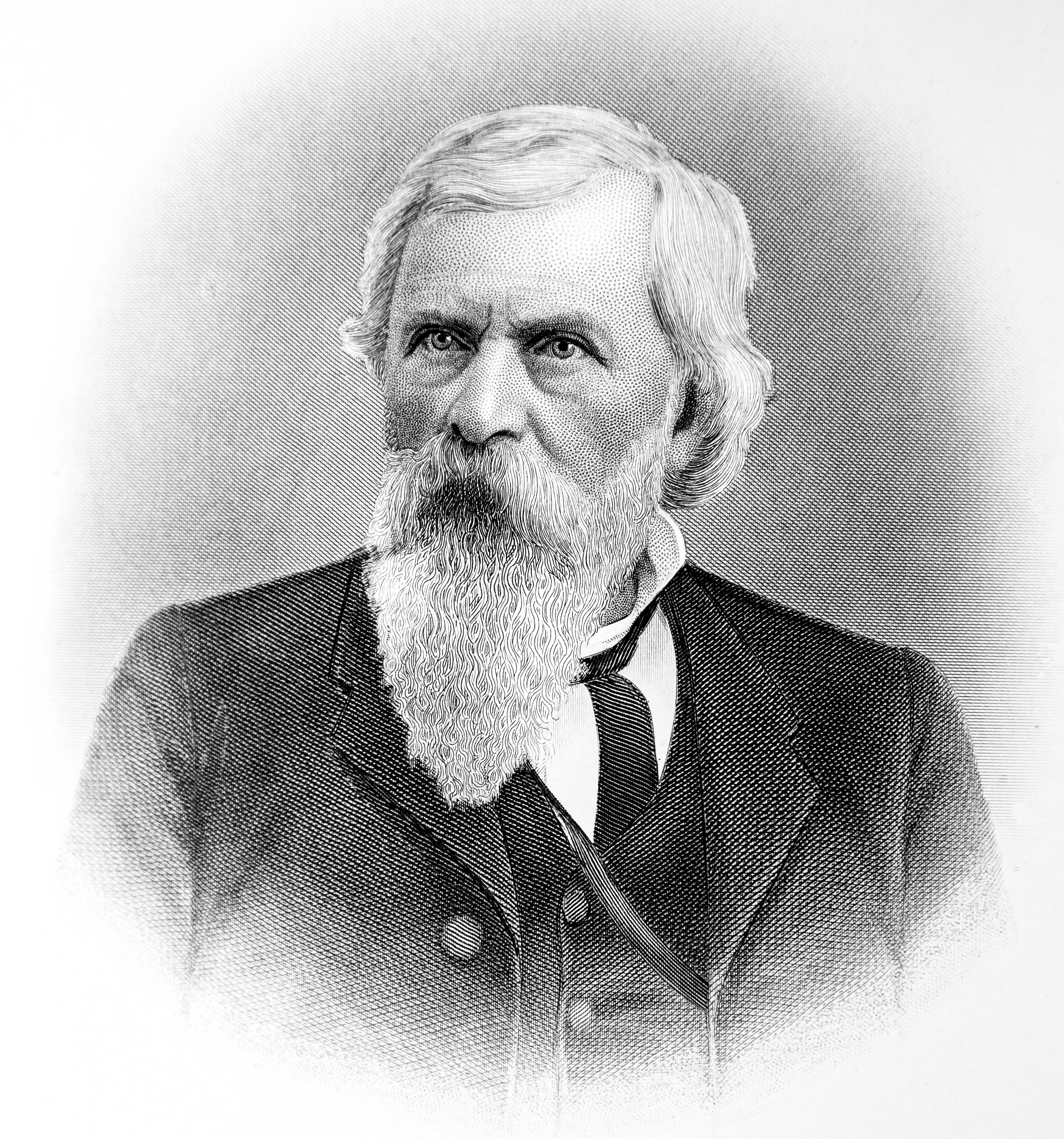
Candidate	John W. Stewart	Homer W. Heaton
Party	Republican	Democratic
Popular vote	33,367	12,058
Percentage	73.45%	26.54%
- County results Stewart: 60–70% 70–80% 80–90%
Governor before election
George W. Hendee
Republican
Elected Governor
John W. Stewart
Republican

The 1870 Vermont gubernatorial election took place on September 6, 1870. In keeping with the "Mountain Rule", incumbent Republican George W. Hendee, who had succeeded to the governorship at the death of Peter T. Washburn, did not run for election to a full term as Governor of Vermont. Republican candidate John W. Stewart defeated Democratic candidate Homer W. Heaton to succeed Hendee. The 1870 election marked the start of biennial gubernatorial elections in Vermont.

== Results ==
1870 Vermont gubernatorial election
Party	Candidate	Votes	%	±%
Republican	John W. Stewart	33,367	73.45	−0.1
Democratic	Homer W. Heaton	12,058	26.54	+0.1
N/A	Other	4	0.01	−0.1
Total votes		45,429	100.0	–
