= 1849 Vermont gubernatorial election =

- September 4, 1849
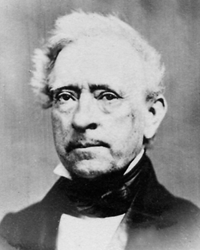
Nominee	Carlos Coolidge	Horatio Needham	Jonas Clark
Party	Whig	Free Soil	Democratic
Electoral vote	149	90	8
Popular vote	26,238	23,250	3,357
Percentage	49.63%	43.98%	6.35%
- County results Coolidge: 40–50% 50–60% 60–70% Needham: 40–50% 50–60% 60–70%
Governor before election
Carlos Coolidge
Whig
Elected Governor
Carlos Coolidge
Whig

The 1849 Vermont gubernatorial election took place on September 4, 1849, to elect the governor of Vermont. As no candidate received a majority of the votes cast, the Vermont General Assembly re-elected Whig Carlos Coolidge with 149 votes to 90 for Horatio Needham and 8 for Jonas Clark.

== Results ==
1849 Vermont gubernatorial election
Party	Candidate	Votes	%	±%
Whig	Carlos Coolidge (incumbent)	26,238	49.63%	
Free Soil	Horatio Needham	23,250	43.98%	
Democratic	Jonas Clark	3,357	6.35%	
Write-in	Other	26	0.05%	
Total votes		'52,871'	'100'	
