= Stephen Thomas (Medal of Honor) =

American Medal of Honor recipient and politician (1809–1903)

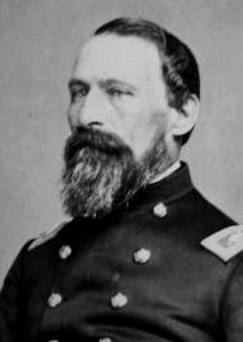

26th Lieutenant Governor of Vermont
- In office 1867–1869
- Governor: John B. Page
- Preceded by: Abraham B. Gardner
- Succeeded by: George W. Hendee

Member of the Vermont Senate from Orange County
- In office 1849–1851 Serving with Joseph W. D. Parker, S. Milton Bigelow
- Preceded by: Henry Keyes, William Sweatt, Jefferson P. Kidder
- Succeeded by: George P. Baldwin, Phineas Moulton, Benjamin Thurber Jr.

Member of the Vermont House of Representatives from West Fairlee
- In office 1860–1862
- Preceded by: Thomas Bond
- Succeeded by: Simeon Hastings
- In office 1845–1847
- Preceded by: Elisha May
- Succeeded by: J. B. Slayton
- In office 1838–1840
- Preceded by: George May
- Succeeded by: David Robinson

Judge of Probate for Vermont's Bradford District
- In office 1847–1849
- Preceded by: Joseph W. D. Parker
- Succeeded by: Arad Stebbins

Personal details
- Born: December 6, 1809 Bethel, Vermont
- Died: December 18, 1903 (aged 94) Montpelier, Vermont
- Resting place: Green Mount Cemetery, Montpelier, Vermont
- Party: Democratic (before 1861); Republican (from 1861)
- Spouse: Ann Peabody (m. 1830–1877, her death)
- Children: 2
- Occupation: Manufacturer
- Awards: Medal of Honor

Military service
- Allegiance: United States of America; Union
- Branch/service: United States Army; Union Army
- Years of service: 1861–1865
- Rank: Brigadier General
- Commands: 8th Vermont Infantry; 2nd Brigade, 1st Division, XIX Corps
- Battles/wars: American Civil War: Battle of New Orleans (Civil War); Battle of Fort Bisland; Siege of Port Hudson; Valley Campaigns of 1864

Stephen Thomas (December 6, 1809 – December 18, 1903), manufacturer, politician, jurist, and Union Army officer. He was a recipient of the Medal of Honor for gallantry.

== Early life ==
Thomas was born in Bethel, Vermont, the son of John and Rebecca (Batchellor) Thomas. His father died while serving in the U.S. 31st Infantry during the War of 1812. His grandfather, Joseph, served in a New Hampshire regiment during the American Revolution. Thomas was only four years old when his father died, and he started work young to help his widowed mother. He apprenticed in the woolen industry, then started his own business, which was destroyed by fire, and finally ended up in the manufacturing business in West Fairlee.

On January 13, 1830, Thomas married Ann Peabody of Reading. She died in West Fairlee on January 8, 1877. They were the parents of two children, son Hartop and daughter Amanda.

In the 1830s and 1840s, Thomas served in the Vermont Militia. He rose through the ranks, and commanded the 19th Regiment's Rifle Company as a captain.

== Political career ==
He represented the town of West Fairlee in the Vermont House of Representatives in 1838, 1839, 1845, 1846, 1860 and 1861. He was a state senator, representing Orange County from 1849 to 1851, and a delegate to the state Constitutional Conventions in 1843 and 1850. He served a register of probate for the district of Bradford from 1842 to 1846, and probate judge from 1847 to 1849.

He was a Democrat until the outbreak of the American Civil War, an alternate to the Democratic national convention of 1848, delegate for the next three conventions, in 1852, 1856 and 1860, and candidate for Lieutenant Governor in 1860.

Governor Erastus Fairbanks called an extra session of the State Legislature on April 23, 1861, which Thomas attended. He was a member of the Ways and Means committee, which intended to report out a bill appropriating half a million dollars for military purposes. Thomas presented an impassioned speech supporting an amendment that doubled the amount to one million dollars. He said "Until this rebellion shall have been put down, I have no friends to reward and no enemies to punish, and I trust that the whole strength and power of Vermont, both of men and of money, will be put into the field to sustain the government."

After some spirited debate in the full house, the measure was passed unanimously. Thomas also supported passage of a bill giving every non-commissioned officer and private seven dollars a month in addition to their Federal pay, and that bill was enacted as well.

== Military career ==
Thomas was commissioned as colonel of the 8th Vermont, a three-year infantry regiment, (Note: The 8th Vermont was raised for specifically for service in the Department of the Gulf unlike its brethren in the 7th Vermont who found out after they were raised. See its Wikipedia article for more information.) on November 12, 1861, and proceeded to recruit the regiment, which was destined to be part of Benjamin F. Butler's New England Division. The regiment left Vermont for the Department of the Gulf on March 4, 1862. It was part of Butler's occupation forces in the New Orleans metropolitan area through 1862. (Note: Thomas and the 8th spent most of 1862 across the river in Algiers. He had general charge of the district around Algiers, in a civil and military capacity, with his own provost judge and marshal. The majority of their duty at the time was rebuilding the New Orleans, Opelousas and Great Western Railroad (NOO&GW) line there, tending to the needs of the large numbers of escaped slaves, and providing security against Rebel forces in the area. For more information, see the regiments's Wikipedia article.), and Thomas commanded it through May 1863, when he assumed command of the 2nd Brigade, 1st Division, XIX Corps, which included the 8th Vermont. During this period, the 8th Vermont participated in the Occupation of New Orleans, and battles at Raceland, Boutte Station, Bayou des Allemands, (Note: Thomas was also responsible for opening up the railway from Algiers to Berwick Bay and was one of the first commanders of black troops of the war during Weitzel's operations around LaFourche from October through December 1862.)Bisland, and Port Hudson.

In July 1864, a portion of the XIX Corps, including the 8th Vermont, was transferred to the eastern theater of the war. They arrived at Fortress Monroe just in time to join the VI Corps in the Shenandoah Valley, and participate in Major General Philip Sheridan's campaign against the Confederacy's Jubal Early. Thomas commanded the 2nd Brigade, 1st Division from October 15 to October 24, and again from November 1 to December 3, which included the 8th Vermont, 12th Connecticut, 160th New York and 47th Pennsylvania infantry regiments. During this period, the 8th Vermont participated in the Battle of Opequon, Battle of Fisher's Hill, Battle of Cedar Creek, and Newton, Virginia. In 1892 he received the Medal of Honor for "distinguished conduct in a desperate hand-to-hand encounter, in which the advance of the enemy was checked," at Cedar Creek on October 19, 1864.

Thomas was appointed Brigadier General of Volunteers on February 1, 1865, and mustered out of the service August 24, 1865.

== Postwar ==
General Thomas started the war as a Democrat, but by the time he returned home, he was a Republican. "But the opposition of the old party, whose favorite he had been, would not permit it, and he was obliged to defend his course in public. The leaders with whom he had affiliated said to him after his return from the war, 'THOMAS, you've changed; we haven't.' 'Fools never do,' was his reply.

He refused to be a candidate for governor, but did serve as lieutenant governor in 1867 and 1868 under Governor John B. Page. He served as a delegate to the soldiers' convention that nominated General Ulysses S. Grant for the presidency.

He was appointed by President Grant as a U.S. pension agent in 1870, and served in that capacity for eight years. In the late 1880s Thomas was president of the U.S. Clothes Pin Company, of Montpelier, which had 15 employees and customers worldwide. He was also president of the North Haverhill Granite Company.

He served as commander of the Department of Vermont, Grand Army of the Republic, and as president of the Vermont Officers' Reunion Society. He was Companion #09174 of the Military Order of the Loyal Legion of the United States, or MOLLUS, through its Vermont Commandery.

General Thomas died in Montpelier, and was buried at Green Mount Cemetery in Montpelier. On October 19, 1914—the 50th anniversary of Cedar Creek — his regiment dedicated a birth marker to him in Bethel-Gilead.

== Medal of Honor citation ==
Rank and organization: Colonel, 8th Vermont Infantry. Place and date: At Cedar Creek, Va., October 19, 1864. Entered service at: Montpelier, Vt. Birth: Vermont. Date of issue: July 25, 1892.

Citation:

The President of the United States of America, in the name of Congress, takes pleasure in presenting the Medal of Honor to Colonel (Infantry) Stephen Thomas, United States Army, for extraordinary heroism on 19 October 1864, while serving with 8th Vermont Infantry, in action at Cedar Creek, Virginia, for distinguished conduct in a desperate hand-to-hand encounter, in which the advance of the enemy was checked.

== See also ==
- List of Medal of Honor recipients
- List of American Civil War Medal of Honor recipients: T–Z
- List of American Civil War generals (Union)

Political offices
Preceded by Abraham B. Gardner	Lieutenant Governor of Vermont; 1867–1869	Succeeded by George W. Hendee

Party political offices
Preceded by Wyllys Lyman	Democratic nominee for Lieutenant Governor of Vermont; 1859, 1860	Succeeded by Giles Harrington
Preceded by Abraham B. Gardner	Republican nominee for Lieutenant Governor of Vermont; 1867, 1868	Succeeded by George Whitman Hendee
