= James M. Hotchkiss =

American farmer, businessman and politician (1812–1877)

President pro tempore of the Vermont Senate
- In office 1856–1856
- Preceded by: Carlos Coolidge
- Succeeded by: Augustus P. Hunton

Member of the Vermont Senate
- In office 1855–1857
- Preceded by: Horace Powers
- Succeeded by: Thomas C. Gleed
- Constituency: Lamoille County

Assistant Judge of Lamoille County, Vermont
- In office 1851–1853 Serving with Giles A. Barber
- Preceded by: Henry Stobwell
- Succeeded by: Nathan Foster

Member of the Vermont House of Representatives
- In office 1851–1855
- Preceded by: None (no selection)
- Succeeded by: Abram Hartshorn
- In office 1850–1851
- Preceded by: Elias Willey
- Succeeded by: None (no selection)
- Constituency: Waterville

Personal details
- Born: May 27, 1812 Georgia, Vermont, US
- Died: May 27, 1877 (aged 65) Fairfax, Vermont, US
- Resting place: Sanderson Corners Cemetery, Fairfax, Vermont, US
- Party: Republican
- Other political affiliations: Opposition; Free Soil Party
- Spouse(s): Mariel Story (m. 1835–1851); Harriet Horsford (m. 1851–1877)
- Children: 3
- Occupation: Merchant; Farmer

James M. Hotchkiss (May 27, 1812 – May 7, 1877) was a Vermont farmer, businessman, and politician. He served in the Vermont House of Representatives and Vermont Senate, and was chosen to serve as the Senate's President pro tem.

== Biography ==
James Madison Hotchkiss was born in Georgia, Vermont on May 27, 1812, the son of James Hotchkiss and Alice (Story) Hotchkiss. He was educated in Georgia, and in 1832 he purchased a farm in Fairfax in partnership with his brother Hiram. They operated the farm for several years, after which James Hotchkiss established himself as a merchant in Fairfax. He later moved to Waterville, where he continued his mercantile career, and returned to Fairfax after 20 years as a Waterville resident.

Hotchkiss was involved in politics as an advocate of abolishing slavery, and as the abolition movement grew and coalesced, he moved successively from the Opposition Party to the Free Soil Party to the Republican Party. He represented Waterville in the Vermont House of Representatives in the early 1850s, and served as one of the assistant judges of Lamoille County from 1851 to 1853. Hotchkiss served in the Vermont Senate from 1855 to 1857, and was chosen to serve as the Senate's President pro tem in 1856.

During the American Civil War, Hotchkiss supported the Union. During and immediately after the conflict, he took part in political conventions of the Union Party, which aimed to fuse Republicans and pro-Union Democrats in support of the war effort and Reconstruction measures that were less severe than those proposed by Radical Republican movement.

After returning to Fairfax, Hotchkiss remained active in politics as a delegate to numerous Republican conventions, and in local offices including Town Meeting Moderator. He was involved in managing his business interests until 1874, after which he lived in retirement in Fairfax.

== Death and burial ==
Hotchkiss died in Fairfax on May 7, 1877. He was buried at Sanderson Corners Cemetery in Fairfax.

== Family ==
In 1835, Hotchkiss married Mariel Story. She died in 1851, and later that year he married Harriet Horsford of Cambridge. With his first wife, Hotchkiss was the father of two children, Hiram J. (1841–1851) and James M. Jr. (1842–1863). Another son, also named Hiram, was born in 1837 and died sometime before 1841.

Hotchkiss' brother Cyrus was a member of the Vermont Senate, and his nephew Cephas served in the Vermont House of Representatives.

== Sources ==
=== Books ===
- Aldrich, Lewis Cass (1891). History of Franklin and Grand Isle Counties, Vermont. Syracuse, New York: D. Mason & Co. p. 697.
- Child, Hamilton (1883). Gazetteer and Business Directory of Lamoille and Orleans Counties, Vt. for 1883-84. Syracuse, New York: Syracuse Journal.
- Deming, Leonard (1851). Catalogue of the Principal Officers of Vermont. Middlebury, Vermont: Leonard Deming.
- Vermont General Assembly (1856). Journal of the House of Representatives and Senate of the State of Vermont. Montpelier, Vermont: E. P. Walton.

=== Newspapers ===
- "Vermont Election: The House - Complete". Vermont Watchman and State Journal. Montpelier, Vermont. September 22, 1853 – via Newspapers.com.
- "The State Convention". Burlington Daily Times. Burlington, Vermont. April 4, 1860 – via Newspapers.com. "An unusually large assemblage of the Republicans of Vermont met at Northfield yesterday."
- "Union State Convention". Lamoille Newsdealer. Hyde Park, Vermont. May 25, 1864 – via Newspapers.com.
- "Town Officers: Fairfax; Moderator". Vermont Transcript. St. Albans, Vermont. March 9, 1866 – via Newspapers.com.
- "The Third District Convention: Committee on Credentials". Burlington Free Press. Burlington, Vermont. August 26, 1870 – via Newspapers.com.

=== Internet ===
- "Vermont Vital Records, 1720-1908, Marriage Entry for James M. Hotchkiss and Mariah Story". Ancestry.com. Provo, Utah: Ancestry.com, LLC. July 26, 1835.
- "Vermont Vital Records, 1720-1908, Birth Record for Hiram Hotchkiss". Ancestry.com. Provo, Utah: Ancestry.com, LLC. September 9, 1837.
- "Vermont Vital Records, 1720-1908, Death Record for Hiram J. Hotchkiss". Ancestry.com. Provo, Utah: Ancestry.com, LLC. October 11, 1851.
- "Vermont, Vital Records, 1720-1908, Marriage Record for Hon. James M Hotchkiss and Harriet Horsford". Ancestry.com. Provo, Utah: Ancestry.com, LLC. November 20, 1851.
- "Vermont Vital Records, 1720-1908, Death Record for James M. Hotchkiss Jr". Ancestry.com. Provo, Utah: Ancestry.com, LLC. May 31, 1863.

Political offices
Preceded by Carlos Coolidge	President pro tempore of the Vermont State Senate; 1856	Succeeded by Augustus P. Hunton
