= Nathan Clark =

American politician

Nathan Clark (July 21, 1718 – April 8, 1792) was a Vermont colonial and Revolutionary War leader who served as Speaker of the Vermont House of Representatives.

== Life and career ==
Clark was born in Preston, Connecticut on July 21, 1718.

Clark was one of Vermont's founders, settling in Bennington in 1762.

During the dispute between Vermonters who held land New Hampshire titles from Benning Wentworth, the colonial Governor, and the government of New York, which tried to make them acquire confirming titles from New York, Clark was a prominent anti-New Yorker, chairing meetings of citizens called to discuss and plan strategy, and preparing written communications to New York's leaders.

In 1777 Clark served as a member of the committee that prepared the Declaration of Independence that created the Republic of Vermont, an entity which remained in existence until Vermont's acceptance into the Union as the 14th state in 1791.

Clark was active in the American Revolution, serving as chairman of Bennington's Committee of Satefy. In addition he served as a Commissary, helping supply the garrison at Fort Ticonderoga, and gathering and organizing the delivery of supplies to the army of Horatio Gates during the Saratoga Campaign. Several of Clark's sons saw military service, and one, Nathan Clark, Jr., was wounded at the Battle of Bennington and later died as a result. Another of Clark's sons, Isaac, served in the Revolution and the War of 1812. Isaac Clark married Hannah, one of the daughters of Governor Thomas Chittenden.

In 1778 Clark was elected to the first session of the Vermont House of Representatives. He was selected to serve as Speaker of the House after Joseph Bowker resigned in order to accept a seat on the Governor's Council.

Clark died in Bennington on April 8, 1792. He was buried in Bennington's Old Cemetery.

Political offices
| Preceded by Joseph Bowker | Speaker of the Vermont House of Representatives; 1778–1778 | Succeeded by Thomas Chandler, Jr. |
