= Julius Converse =

American politician

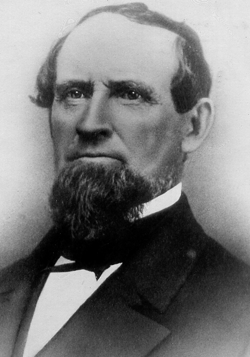

34th Governor of Vermont
- In office October 3, 1872 – October 8, 1874
- Lieutenant: Russell S. Taft
- Preceded by: John W. Stewart
- Succeeded by: Asahel Peck

17th Lieutenant Governor of Vermont
- In office 1850–1852
- Governor: Charles K. Williams
- Preceded by: Robert Pierpoint
- Succeeded by: William C. Kittredge

Member of the Vermont House of Representatives
- In office 1867–1869
- Preceded by: Charles Marsh
- Succeeded by: Lorenzo Richmond
- Constituency: Woodstock
- In office 1847–1850
- Preceded by: Nathan T. Churchill
- Succeeded by: Thomas E. Powers
- Constituency: Woodstock
- In office 1833–1834
- Preceded by: Elisha Fowler
- Succeeded by: John Woodbury
- Constituency: Bethel

Member of the Vermont Senate
- In office 1836–1840 Serving with Various (Multimember district)
- Preceded by: None (Position created)
- Succeeded by: Barnabas Dean, Abel Gilson, Walter Palmer, Thomas P. Russell
- Constituency: Windsor County

Personal details
- Born: December 27, 1798 Stafford, Connecticut, US
- Died: August 16, 1885 (aged 86) Dixville Notch, New Hampshire, US
- Resting place: River Street Cemetery, Woodstock, Vermont, US
- Party: Whig (before 1859); Republican (from 1859)
- Spouse(s): Melissa Arnold (m. 1825–1872) Jane Elvira Martin (m. 1873–1885)
- Children: 1
- Profession: Attorney

Julius Converse (December 27, 1798 – August 16, 1885) was an American politician. He was the 34th governor of Vermont, from 1872 to 1874 and the 17th lieutenant governor of Vermont from 1850 to 1852.

== Early life and start of political career ==
Julius Converse was born in Stafford, Connecticut, on December 27, 1798. He was raised in Vermont, educated at Vermont's Randolph Academy, studied law, and became an attorney in Bethel in 1826. A Whig, Converse served in the Vermont House of Representatives in 1833 and the Vermont State Senate from 1836 to 1840.

After his state senate term ended, Converse moved to Woodstock, where he resumed practicing law and served as Windsor County State's Attorney from 1844 to 1847. He returned to the Vermont house in 1847, serving until 1850. From 1850 to 1852 Converse was Vermont's lieutenant governor. He became a Republican when the party was founded in the 1850s, and served in the Vermont House for the third time from 1867 to 1869. In 1869 he was an unsuccessful candidate for the nomination for governor, losing to Peter T. Washburn.

== Election as governor ==
In 1872 Converse was selected as the Republican nominee for governor even though he was over 70 years old, was not an active candidate, and had not campaigned for the position. His nomination was regarded by observers as a way to block the candidacy of railroad magnate Frederick H. Billings, who had only recently returned to Vermont from California, and the renomination of incumbent John W. Stewart, which would break the Republican party's Mountain Rule. Converse won the general election and served as governor from 1872 to 1874, afterwards living in retirement.

== Family ==
In 1825 Julius Converse was married to Melissa Arnold (born June 1, 1799) of Randolph. The couple had no children, and Mrs. Converse died on December 12, 1872. In 1873 Converse married 31-year-old Jane Martin (born North Stratford, New Hampshire, March 24, 1842 - died Lowell, Massachusetts, June 22, 1916). They were the parents of a daughter, Luna Belle Converse (June 13, 1874 – May 14, 1961).

== Death and burial ==
Converse died on August 16, 1885, aged 86, while vacationing in Dixville Notch, New Hampshire. He was buried in Woodstock's River Street Cemetery.

Party political offices
Preceded by Robert Pierpoint	Whig nominee for Lieutenant Governor of Vermont; 1850, 1851	Succeeded by William C. Kittredge
Preceded by John Wolcott Stewart	Republican nominee for Governor of Vermont; 1872	Succeeded by Asahel Peck
Political offices
Preceded by Robert Pierpoint	Lieutenant Governor of Vermont; 1850–1852	Succeeded by William C. Kittredge
Preceded by John W. Stewart	Governor of Vermont; 1872–1874	Succeeded by Asahel Peck
