= John Wolcott Stewart =

American politician (1825–1915)

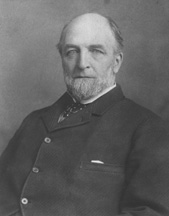

United States Senator from Vermont
- In office March 24, 1908 – October 21, 1908
- Appointed by: Fletcher D. Proctor
- Preceded by: Redfield Proctor
- Succeeded by: Carroll S. Page

Member of the U.S. House of Representatives from Vermont's 1st district
- In office March 4, 1883 – March 3, 1891
- Preceded by: Charles Herbert Joyce
- Succeeded by: H. Henry Powers

33rd Governor of Vermont
- In office October 6, 1870 – October 3, 1872
- Lieutenant: George N. Dale
- Preceded by: George W. Hendee
- Succeeded by: Julius Converse

Speaker of the Vermont House of Representatives
- In office 1876–1878
- Preceded by: Josiah Grout
- Succeeded by: James Loren Martin
- In office 1865–1868
- Preceded by: Abraham B. Gardner
- Succeeded by: George W. Grandey

Member of the Vermont Senate
- In office 1861–1862 Serving with Frederick E. Woodbridge (1861), Samuel D. Holcomb (1862)
- Preceded by: Alonzo G. Allen, Frederick E. Woodbridge
- Succeeded by: Samuel D. Holcomb, Earl Cushman
- Constituency: Addison County

Member of the Vermont House of Representatives from Middlebury
- In office 1876–1878
- Preceded by: James M. Slade Jr.
- Succeeded by: George Hammond
- In office 1864–1868
- Preceded by: William H. Parker
- Succeeded by: Calvin Hill
- In office 1856–1858
- Preceded by: Julius A. Beckwith
- Succeeded by: Edwin Hammond

State's Attorney of Addison County, Vermont
- In office 1851–1854
- Preceded by: John Prout
- Succeeded by: Frederick E. Woodbridge

Personal details
- Born: November 24, 1825 Middlebury, Vermont, US
- Died: October 29, 1915 (aged 89) Middlebury, Vermont, US
- Resting place: West Cemetery, Middlebury, Vermont U.S.
- Party: Republican
- Spouse: Emma Seymour Battell
- Children: 5
- Education: Middlebury College
- Profession: Lawyer
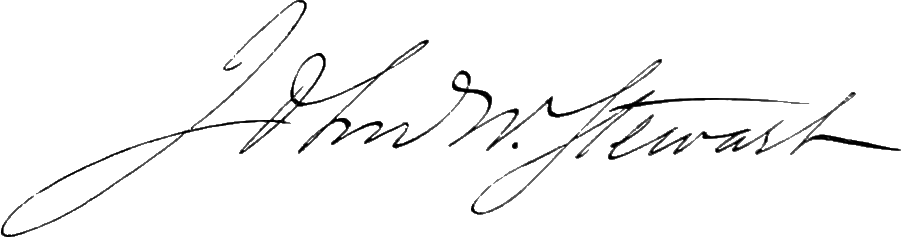
- Signature

John Wolcott Stewart (November 24, 1825 – October 29, 1915) was an American lawyer and politician from Vermont. He served as Speaker of the Vermont House of Representatives and as the 33rd governor of Vermont before serving in the United States House of Representatives and briefly in the U.S. Senate.

== Biography ==
Born in Middlebury, Vermont, Stewart attended the Middlebury Academy, and graduated from Middlebury College in 1846. He studied law with Horatio Seymour, and was admitted to the bar in 1850. He served as State's Attorney of Addison County from 1851 to 1854. He married Emma Seymour Battell on November 21, 1860, and they had five children. Emma Battell was the daughter of Philip Battell and Emma Hart Seymour, and Emma Hart Seymour was the daughter of Horatio Seymour. Stewart's brother Dugald served as Vermont Auditor of Accounts from 1864 to 1870.

== Career ==
Stewart served as a member of the Vermont House of Representatives in 1856 and 1857, and then was a member of the Vermont Senate from 1861 to 1862. He returned to the state House from 1864 to 1868, serving as Speaker from 1865 to 1868, and then became the governor of Vermont from 1870 to 1872. He was the first governor of the state to serve a two-year term. Later he returned to the state House from 1876 to 1878, and again served as Speaker.

Stewart was elected as a Republican to the U.S. House of Representatives in the 1882 election. He was subsequently reelected three times and served from March 4, 1883, to March 3, 1891. He declined to be a candidate for renomination in 1890, but instead engaged in the banking business at Middlebury. Stewart was appointed to the Senate on March 24, 1908, to fill the vacancy caused by the death of Redfield Proctor, and served until October 21 of that year, when a successor was elected.

== Death ==
Stewart retired from political life and active business pursuits, and resided in Middlebury until his death there. He is interred at West Cemetery in Middlebury.

Party political offices
Preceded by Peter T. Washburn	Republican nominee for Governor of Vermont; 1870	Succeeded by Julius Converse
Political offices
Preceded by George W. Hendee	Governor of Vermont; 1870–1872	Succeeded by Julius Converse
U.S. House of Representatives
Preceded by Charles Herbert Joyce	U.S. Representative from Vermont's first district 1883–1891	Succeeded by H. Henry Powers
U.S. Senate
Preceded by Redfield Proctor	U.S. senator (Class 1) from Vermont; 1908; Served alongside: William P. Dillingham	Succeeded by Carroll S. Page
