= John E. Hancock =

American politician

John E. Hancock (March 23, 1903 – June 23, 1982) was a Vermont farmer and politician who served one term as Speaker of the Vermont House of Representatives.

== Biography ==
John Ellsworth Hancock, Jr. was born in Hardwick, Vermont on March 23, 1903. He graduated from Hardwick Academy, attended Middlebury College and became a farmer in Hardwick.

Hancock was also involved in local businesses and civic institutions in Hardwick, including serving as President of Vermont Cooperative Creameries, President of the Hardwick Trust Company and Vice President of the St. Johnsbury and Lamoille County Railroad.

A Republican, Hancock served in local offices including Town Meeting Moderator and Selectman. He served in the Vermont House of Representatives from 1933 to 1935, and in the Vermont Senate from 1939 to 1941. In the 1940s and 1950s he was a member of the state Civil Defense Board.

In 1950 Hancock was again elected to the Vermont House, serving from 1951 to 1957, and holding the office of Speaker of the House from 1955 to 1957.

Hancock was an unsuccessful candidate for lieutenant governor in 1956, losing the Republican primary to Robert Stafford.

In 1966 Hancock returned to the Vermont House of Representatives, serving until 1977.

Hancock died in Morrisville, Vermont June 23, 1982 and was buried in East Hardwick's Sanborn Cemetery.

Political offices
Preceded by Consuelo N. Bailey	Speaker of the Vermont House of Representatives; 1955–1957	Succeeded by Charles H. Brown
