= Carlos Coolidge =

American politician (1792–1866)

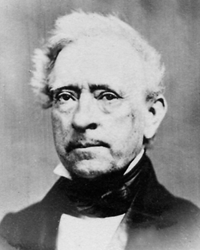
- Coolidge in the 1850s

19th Governor of Vermont
- In office October 1, 1848 – October 11, 1850
- Lieutenant: Robert Pierpoint
- Preceded by: Horace Eaton
- Succeeded by: Charles K. Williams

President pro tempore of the Vermont Senate
- In office 1853–1856
- Preceded by: Orlando Stevens
- Succeeded by: James M. Hotchkiss

Member of the Vermont Senate
- In office 1853–1856 Serving with Benoni Buck, Thomas H. Harvey, Dudley Chase Denison (1853); Dudley Chase Denison, Daniel A. Heald, Norman Williams (1854); Norman Williams, Shubael Converse, George Johnson (1855)
- Preceded by: Warren Currier, Daniel Lyman, Asa B. Foster, Crosby Miller
- Succeeded by: George Johnson, Shubael Converse, Augustus P. Hunton, George F. Davis
- Constituency: Windsor County

Speaker of the Vermont House of Representatives
- In office 1839–1842
- Preceded by: Solomon Foot
- Succeeded by: Andrew Tracy
- In office 1836–1837
- Preceded by: Ebenezer N. Briggs
- Succeeded by: Solomon Foot

Member of the Vermont House of Representatives
- In office 1839–1842
- Preceded by: Charles Hopkins
- Succeeded by: Allen Wardner
- Constituency: Windsor
- In office 1834–1837
- Preceded by: Allen Wardner
- Succeeded by: Charles Hopkins
- Constituency: Windsor

State's Attorney of Windsor County, Vermont
- In office 1831–1836
- Preceded by: Wyllys Lyman
- Succeeded by: Oliver P. Chandler

Personal details
- Born: June 25, 1792 Windsor, Vermont, US
- Died: August 15, 1866 (aged 74) Windsor, Vermont, US
- Resting place: Old South Church Cemetery, Windsor, Vermont, US
- Party: Whig
- Spouse: Harriet Bingham (m. 1817–1866)
- Children: 2
- Education: Middlebury College
- Profession: Attorney

Carlos Coolidge (June 25, 1792 – August 15, 1866) was an American attorney and politician from Windsor, Vermont. Originally a Whig, and later a Republican, he served as governor of Vermont from 1848 to 1850.

A native of Windsor, Coolidge graduated from Middlebury College in 1811. He served in the militia and studied law, and attained admission to the bar in 1814 and practiced in Windsor. Coolidge's legal career continued for more than fifty years, and he was active almost until his death. Coolidge was active in local office throughout his life, including justice of the peace. originally a Whig, Coolidge served as Windsor County State's Attorney from 1831 to 1836. He represented Windsor in the Vermont House of Representatives from 1834 to 1837 and served as speaker of the house from 1836 to 1837. He served again in the Vermont House from 1839 to 1842 and was again chosen to serve as speaker. In 1848, he was the successful Whig nominee for governor; he was reelected in 1849 and served from October 1848 to October 1850.

After leaving the governorship, Coolidge resumed his legal practice. He served in the Vermont Senate from 1853 to 1856 and was elected as the senate's president pro tempore. Coolidge became a Republican when the party was founded in the mid-1850s. He died in Windsor on August 15, 1866 and was buried at Old South Church Cemetery in Windsor.

== Biography ==
Coolidge was born in Windsor, Vermont on June 25, 1792, the son of Nathan Coolidge and Elizabeth (Curtis) Coolidge. His extended family included Calvin Coolidge, who was a distant cousin. He attended the schools of Windsor, and studied with Reverend James Converse of Weathersfield in preparation for attending college. He began studies at Dartmouth College, transferred to Middlebury College in 1809, and graduated with honors in 1811. He studied law with Peter Starr of Middlebury, and then with Jonathan H. Hubbard of Windsor, attained admission to the bar, and began a practice in Windsor in 1814. Coolidge was active well into his old age, and practiced for more than fifty years. On September 22, 1817, Coolidge married Harriet Bingham and the couple had two daughters, Mary and Harriet. Mary Coolidge (1818–1875) was the wife of Reverend Franklin Butler (1814–1880). Harriet (1826–1831) died at the age of 5.

== Career ==
In 1816, Coolidge was commissioned as a captain in the Vermont Militia, and assigned to 1st Regiment, 4th Division. He remained in the militia for several years, and advanced to colonel and commander of the regiment.

Coolidge was one of the first members of the state Board of Bank Commissioners. He was elected State's Attorney for Windsor County and served from 1831 until 1836. He was a Representative in the Vermont House from 1834 to 1837, and served as Speaker from 1836 to 1837. He served in the House again from 1839 to 1842, and was again Speaker of the House. In 1835 he received an honorary Master of Arts degree from the University of Vermont.

Coolidge was one of Vermont's presidential electors in 1844, and cast his ballot for Henry Clay and Theodore Frelinghuysen. He served as President of the Vermont Whig Convention in 1847, which passed resolutions opposing the Mexican–American War and the acquisition of territory by conquest, and in favor of the Wilmot Proviso. Coolidge's anti-slavery views also included the idea of returning freed slaves to Africa as settlers, and he was active in both the American Colonization Society and the Vermont Colonization Society.

Coolidge served two terms as Governor of Vermont from October 1, 1848, to October 11, 1850. During his tenure, a Supreme Court and Circuit Court System was established. He received an honorary LL.D. degree from Middlebury College in 1849.

After serving as Governor Coolidge returned to his law practice in Windsor. He became a Republican when the party was founded in the 1850s, and served in the Vermont State Senate from 1853 to 1856, after which he again returned to his law practice.

== Death ==
Coolidge died in Windsor, Vermont, on August 15, 1866, and is interred in Windsor's Old South Church Cemetery.

Party political offices
Preceded by Horace Eaton	Whig nominee for Governor of Vermont; 1848, 1849	Succeeded by Charles K. Williams
Political offices
Preceded by Ebenezer N. Briggs	Speaker of the Vermont House of Representatives; 1836–1837	Succeeded by Solomon Foot
Preceded by Solomon Foot	Speaker of the Vermont House of Representatives; 1839–1842	Succeeded by Andrew Tracy
Preceded by Orlando Stevens	President pro tempore of the Vermont State Senate; 1853-1856	Succeeded by James M. Hotchkiss
Preceded by Horace Eaton	Governor of Vermont; 1848–1850	Succeeded by Charles K. Williams
