= Vermont's congressional delegations =

These are tables of congressional delegations from Vermont to the United States Senate and United States House of Representatives.

Vermont was the last state in the United States to include a woman in its congressional delegation, in 2023, when Becca Balint was sworn in as its only U.S. House member following her victory in the 2022 election. Despite its status as a heavily Democratic-majority state, it has only sent two Democratic United States senators to Congress in its entire history. Bernie Sanders and Peter Welch are the current senators from the state. At age 34, Patrick Leahy was the youngest U.S. senator in Vermont history, the first non-Republican senator from Vermont since 1856, and the first Democrat to represent Vermont in the chamber.

The current dean of the Vermont congressional delegation is Senator Bernie Sanders (I), having served in the Senate since 2007 and in Congress since 1991.

== Current delegation ==
Current U.S. senators from Vermont
Vermont CPVI (2025): D+17	Class I senator	Class III senator
Vermont CPVI (2025): D+17	Bernie Sanders (Senior senator) (Burlington)	Peter Welch (Junior senator) (Norwich)
Party	Independent	Democratic
Incumbent since	January 3, 2007	January 3, 2023

Vermont's current delegation in the 119th United States Congress consists of two senators—Bernie Sanders, an independent politician; and Peter Welch, a Democrat—and one member of the United States House, Democratic representative Becca Balint.

The Cook Partisan Voting Index (CPVI) is a measure of how strongly partisan a state is. For each district or state, the CPVI measures the party leaning (Democratic or Republican) and the number of percentage points more partisan than the national average. In 2025, the CPVI gave Vermont an D+17 rating, meaning the state voted seventeen percentage points more Democratic than the national average.

Current U.S. representatives from Vermont
District	Member (Residence)	Party	Incumbent since	CPVI (2025)	District map
At-large	Becca Balint (Brattleboro)	Democratic	January 3, 2023	D+17	

== United States Senate ==
Four presidents pro tempore of the United States Senate—Stephen R. Bradley, Solomon Foot, George Franklin Edmunds, and Patrick Joseph Leahy—have been from Vermont. Of the four, Bradley, one Vermont's first senators after its admittance into the Union, also served as the first chairman of the Senate Judiciary Committee and helped author the Twelfth Amendment to the United States Constitution, while Leahy (who chaired the Senate Committee on Agriculture, Nutrition, and Forestry, Senate Judiciary Committee, and Senate Appropriations Committee) is, as of 2026, the longest-serving senator from Vermont.

Other Vermont senators include Justin Morrill, the namesake of the Morrill Land-Grant Acts and the longest serving chair of the Senate Committee on Finance; and Bernie Sanders, chairman of the Senate Committee on Veterans' Affairs and Senate Committee on Health, Education, Labor, and Pensions and the longest-serving independent in U.S. congressional history.

Class I senator	Congress	Class III senator
Moses Robinson (AA)	2nd (1791–1793)	Stephen R. Bradley (AA)
Moses Robinson (AA)	3rd (1793–1795)	Stephen R. Bradley (AA)
Moses Robinson (DR) (Note: Senator Robinson resigned on October 15, 1796, citing the "circumstances of [his] domestic affairs".)	4th (1795–1797)	Elijah Paine (F) (Note: Senator Paine resigned from the Senate on September 1, 1801, to serve as the United States district judge for the District of Vermont.)
Isaac Tichenor (F) (Note: Senator Tichenor served from October 17, 1791, following the resignation of his predecessor, Moses Robinson, to October 15, 1796, when he resigned from the Senate to serve as the Governor of Vermont.)	4th (1795–1797)	Elijah Paine (F)
Isaac Tichenor (F)	5th (1797–1799)	Elijah Paine (F)
Nathaniel Chipman (F)	5th (1797–1799)	Elijah Paine (F)
Nathaniel Chipman (F)	6th (1799–1801)	Elijah Paine (F)
Nathaniel Chipman (F)	7th (1801–1803)	Elijah Paine (F)
Nathaniel Chipman (F)	7th (1801–1803)	Stephen R. Bradley (DR)
Israel Smith (DR) (Note: Senator Smith served from March 4, 1803, to October 1, 1807, when he resigned from the Senate to serve as the Governor of Vermont.)	8th (1803–1805)	Stephen R. Bradley (DR)
Israel Smith (DR)	9th (1805–1807)	Stephen R. Bradley (DR)
Israel Smith (DR)	10th (1807–1809)	Stephen R. Bradley (DR)
Jonathan Robinson (DR)	10th (1807–1809)	Stephen R. Bradley (DR)
Jonathan Robinson (DR)	11th (1809–1811)	Stephen R. Bradley (DR)
Jonathan Robinson (DR)	12th (1811–1813)	Stephen R. Bradley (DR)
Jonathan Robinson (DR)	13th (1813–1815)	Dudley Chase (DR) (Note: Senator Chase resigned from the Senate on November 3, 1817, to serve as the chief justice of the Vermont Supreme Court.)
Isaac Tichenor (F)	14th (1815–1817)	Dudley Chase (DR)
Isaac Tichenor (F)	15th (1817–1819)	Dudley Chase (DR)
Isaac Tichenor (F)	15th (1817–1819)	James Fisk (DR) (Note: Senator Fisk served from November 4, 1817, following the resignation of his predecessor, Dudley Chase, to January 8, 1818, when he resigned from the Senate to serve as the Collector of Customs for the district of Vermont.)
Isaac Tichenor (F)	15th (1817–1819)	William A. Palmer (DR)
Isaac Tichenor (F)	16th (1819–1821)	William A. Palmer (DR)
Horatio Seymour (DR)	17th (1821–1823)	William A. Palmer (DR)
Horatio Seymour (DR)	18th (1823–1825)	William A. Palmer (DR)
Horatio Seymour (NR)	19th (1825–1827)	Dudley Chase (NR)
Horatio Seymour (NR)	20th (1827–1829)	Dudley Chase (NR)
Horatio Seymour (NR)	21st (1829–1831)	Dudley Chase (NR)
Horatio Seymour (NR)	22nd (1831–1833)	Samuel Prentiss (NR)
Benjamin Swift (NR)	23rd (1833–1835)	Samuel Prentiss (NR)
Benjamin Swift (NR)	24th (1835–1837)	Samuel Prentiss (NR)
Benjamin Swift (W)	25th (1837–1839)	Samuel Prentiss (W) (Note: Senator Prentiss resigned from the Senate on April 11, 1842, to serve as the United States district judge for the District of Vermont.)
Samuel S. Phelps (W)	26th (1839–1841)	Samuel Prentiss (W)
Samuel S. Phelps (W)	27th (1841–1843)	Samuel Prentiss (W)
Samuel S. Phelps (W)	27th (1841–1843)	Samuel C. Crafts (W)
Samuel S. Phelps (W)	28th (1843–1845)	William Upham (W)
Samuel S. Phelps (W)	29th (1845–1847)	William Upham (W)
Samuel S. Phelps (W)	30th (1847–1849)	William Upham (W)
Samuel S. Phelps (W)	31st (1849–1851)	William Upham (W)
Solomon Foot (W)	32nd (1851–1853)	William Upham (W)
Solomon Foot (W)	33rd (1853–1855)	Samuel S. Phelps (W)
Solomon Foot (W)	33rd (1853–1855)	Lawrence Brainerd (FS)
Solomon Foot (R) (Note: Senator Foot died on March 28, 1866, while in office.)	34th (1855–1857)	Jacob Collamer (R) (Note: Senator Collamer died on November 9, 1865, while in office.)
Solomon Foot (R)	35th (1857–1859)	Jacob Collamer (R)
Solomon Foot (R)	36th (1859–1861)	Jacob Collamer (R)
Solomon Foot (R)	37th (1861–1863)	Jacob Collamer (R)
Solomon Foot (R)	38th (1863–1865)	Jacob Collamer (R)
Solomon Foot (R)	39th (1865–1867)	Jacob Collamer (R)
George F. Edmunds (R) (Note: Senator Edmunds served from April 3, 1866, following the death of his predecessor, Solomon Foot, to November 1, 1891, when he resigned from the Senate.)	39th (1865–1867)	Luke P. Poland (R)
George F. Edmunds (R)	40th (1867–1869)	Justin S. Morrill (R) (Note: Senator Morrill died on December 28, 1898, while in office.)
George F. Edmunds (R)	41st (1869–1871)	Justin S. Morrill (R)
George F. Edmunds (R)	42nd (1871–1873)	Justin S. Morrill (R)
George F. Edmunds (R)	43rd (1873–1875)	Justin S. Morrill (R)
George F. Edmunds (R)	44th (1875–1877)	Justin S. Morrill (R)
George F. Edmunds (R)	45th (1877–1879)	Justin S. Morrill (R)
George F. Edmunds (R)	46th (1879–1881)	Justin S. Morrill (R)
George F. Edmunds (R)	47th (1881–1883)	Justin S. Morrill (R)
George F. Edmunds (R)	48th (1883–1885)	Justin S. Morrill (R)
George F. Edmunds (R)	49th (1885–1887)	Justin S. Morrill (R)
George F. Edmunds (R)	50th (1887–1889)	Justin S. Morrill (R)
George F. Edmunds (R)	51st (1889–1891)	Justin S. Morrill (R)
George F. Edmunds (R)	52nd (1891–1893)	Justin S. Morrill (R)
Redfield Proctor (R) (Note: Senator Proctor served from November 2, 1891, following the resignation of his predecessor, George F. Edmunds, to March 4, 1908, when he died in office.)	52nd (1891–1893)	Justin S. Morrill (R)
Redfield Proctor (R)	53rd (1893–1895)	Justin S. Morrill (R)
Redfield Proctor (R)	54th (1895–1897)	Justin S. Morrill (R)
Redfield Proctor (R)	55th (1897–1899)	Justin S. Morrill (R)
Redfield Proctor (R)	55th (1897–1899)	Jonathan Ross (R) (Note: Senator Ross served from January 11, 1899, appointed following the death of his predecessor, Justin S. Morrill, to October 18, 1900, when William P. Dillingham was elected as Greene's successor.)
Redfield Proctor (R)	56th (1899–1901)	Jonathan Ross (R)
Redfield Proctor (R)	56th (1899–1901)	William P. Dillingham (R) (Note: Senator Dillingham served from October 18, 1900, elected following the death of Justin S. Morrill, to July 12, 1923, when he died in office.)
Redfield Proctor (R)	57th (1901–1903)	William P. Dillingham (R)
Redfield Proctor (R)	58th (1903–1905)	William P. Dillingham (R)
Redfield Proctor (R)	59th (1905–1907)	William P. Dillingham (R)
Redfield Proctor (R)	60th (1907–1909)	William P. Dillingham (R)
John Wolcott Stewart (R) (Note: Senator Stewart served from March 24, 1908, elected following the death of his predecessor, Redfield Proctor, to October 20, 1908, when Carroll S. Page was elected as Proctor's successor.)	60th (1907–1909)	William P. Dillingham (R)
Carroll S. Page (R)	60th (1907–1909)	William P. Dillingham (R)
Carroll S. Page (R)	61st (1909–1911)	William P. Dillingham (R)
Carroll S. Page (R)	62nd (1911–1913)	William P. Dillingham (R)
Carroll S. Page (R)	63rd (1913–1915)	William P. Dillingham (R)
Carroll S. Page (R)	64th (1915–1917)	William P. Dillingham (R)
Carroll S. Page (R)	65th (1917–1919)	William P. Dillingham (R)
Carroll S. Page (R)	66th (1919–1921)	William P. Dillingham (R)
Carroll S. Page (R)	67th (1921–1923)	William P. Dillingham (R)
Frank L. Greene (R) (Note: Senator Greene died on December 17, 1930, while in office.)	68th (1923–1925)	William P. Dillingham (R)
Frank L. Greene (R)	68th (1923–1925)	Porter H. Dale (R) (Note: Senator Dale served from November 6, 1923, elected following the death of his predecessor, William P. Dillingham, to October 6, 1933, when he died in office.)
Frank L. Greene (R)	69th (1925–1927)	Porter H. Dale (R)
Frank L. Greene (R)	70th (1927–1929)	Porter H. Dale (R)
Frank L. Greene (R)	71st (1929–1931)	Porter H. Dale (R)
Frank C. Partridge (R) (Note: Senator Partridge served from December 23, 1930, appointed following the death of his predecessor, Frank L. Greene, to March 31, 1931, when Warren Austin was elected as Greene's successor.)	71st (1929–1931)	Porter H. Dale (R)
Frank C. Partridge (R)	72nd (1931–1933)	Porter H. Dale (R)
Warren Austin (R) (Note: Senator Austin served from March 31, 1931, elected following the death of Frank L. Greene, to August 2, 1946, when he resigned from the Senate to serve as the U.S. Ambassador to the United Nations.)	72nd (1931–1933)	Porter H. Dale (R)
Warren Austin (R)	73rd (1933–1935)	Porter H. Dale (R)
Warren Austin (R)	73rd (1933–1935)	Ernest W. Gibson (R) (Note: Senator Gibson served from January 16, 1934, elected following the death of his predecessor, Porter H. Dale, to June 20, 1940, when he died in office.)
Warren Austin (R)	74th (1935–1937)	Ernest W. Gibson (R)
Warren Austin (R)	75th (1937–1939)	Ernest W. Gibson (R)
Warren Austin (R)	76th (1939–1941)	Ernest W. Gibson (R)
Warren Austin (R)	76th (1939–1941)	Ernest W. Gibson Jr. (R)
Warren Austin (R)	77th (1941–1943)	George Aiken (R)
Warren Austin (R)	78th (1943–1945)	George Aiken (R)
Warren Austin (R)	79th (1945–1947)	George Aiken (R)
Ralph Flanders (R)	79th (1945–1947)	George Aiken (R)
Ralph Flanders (R)	80th (1947–1949)	George Aiken (R)
Ralph Flanders (R)	81st (1949–1951)	George Aiken (R)
Ralph Flanders (R)	82nd (1951–1953)	George Aiken (R)
Ralph Flanders (R)	83rd (1953–1955)	George Aiken (R)
Ralph Flanders (R)	84th (1955–1957)	George Aiken (R)
Ralph Flanders (R)	85th (1957–1959)	George Aiken (R)
Winston L. Prouty (R) (Note: Senator Prouty died on September 10, 1971, while in office.)	86th (1959–1961)	George Aiken (R)
Winston L. Prouty (R)	87th (1961–1963)	George Aiken (R)
Winston L. Prouty (R)	88th (1963–1965)	George Aiken (R)
Winston L. Prouty (R)	89th (1965–1967)	George Aiken (R)
Winston L. Prouty (R)	90th (1967–1969)	George Aiken (R)
Winston L. Prouty (R)	91st (1969–1971)	George Aiken (R)
Winston L. Prouty (R)	92nd (1971–1973)	George Aiken (R)
Robert Stafford (R)	92nd (1971–1973)	George Aiken (R)
Robert Stafford (R)	93rd (1973–1975)	George Aiken (R)
Robert Stafford (R)	94th (1975–1977)	Patrick Leahy (D)
Robert Stafford (R)	95th (1977–1979)	Patrick Leahy (D)
Robert Stafford (R)	96th (1979–1981)	Patrick Leahy (D)
Robert Stafford (R)	97th (1981–1983)	Patrick Leahy (D)
Robert Stafford (R)	98th (1983–1985)	Patrick Leahy (D)
Robert Stafford (R)	99th (1985–1987)	Patrick Leahy (D)
Robert Stafford (R)	100th (1987–1989)	Patrick Leahy (D)
Jim Jeffords (R)	101st (1989–1991)	Patrick Leahy (D)
Jim Jeffords (R)	102nd (1991–1993)	Patrick Leahy (D)
Jim Jeffords (R)	103rd (1993–1995)	Patrick Leahy (D)
Jim Jeffords (R)	104th (1995–1997)	Patrick Leahy (D)
Jim Jeffords (R)	105th (1997–1999)	Patrick Leahy (D)
Jim Jeffords (R)	106th (1999–2001)	Patrick Leahy (D)
Jim Jeffords (R)	107th (2001–2003)	Patrick Leahy (D)
Jim Jeffords (I)	107th (2001–2003)	Patrick Leahy (D)
Jim Jeffords (I)	108th (2003–2005)	Patrick Leahy (D)
Jim Jeffords (I)	109th (2005–2007)	Patrick Leahy (D)
Bernie Sanders (I)	110th (2007–2009)	Patrick Leahy (D)
Bernie Sanders (I)	111th (2009–2011)	Patrick Leahy (D)
Bernie Sanders (I)	112th (2011–2013)	Patrick Leahy (D)
Bernie Sanders (I)	113th (2013–2015)	Patrick Leahy (D)
Bernie Sanders (I)	114th (2015–2017)	Patrick Leahy (D)
Bernie Sanders (I)	115th (2017–2019)	Patrick Leahy (D)
Bernie Sanders (I)	116th (2019–2021)	Patrick Leahy (D)
Bernie Sanders (I)	117th (2021–2023)	Patrick Leahy (D)
Bernie Sanders (I)	118th (2023–2025)	Peter Welch (D)
Bernie Sanders (I)	119th (2025–2027)	Peter Welch (D)
Bernie Sanders (I)	120th (2027–2029)	Peter Welch (D)

== U.S. House of Representatives ==
Current representative

Vermont used at-large seats, but restored the districts in 1821. Starting after the 1820 United States census, Vermont had five seats. Initially it used at-large seats, but starting in 1825 those seats were districted. All five representatives supported the Adams-Clay faction in the 1824 United States presidential election.

Starting after the 1840 United States census, Vermont had four seats. Starting after the 1850 United States census, Vermont had three seats. Starting after the 1880 United States census, Vermont had two seats. Since 1933, Vermont has had one at-large seat.

=== 1791–1813 ===
Congress	1st district	2nd district	3rd district	4th district
2nd (1791–1793)	Israel Smith (AA)	Nathan Niles (AA)	3rd district	4th district
3rd (1793–1795)	Israel Smith (AA)	Nathan Niles (AA)	3rd district	4th district
4th (1795–1797)	Israel Smith (DR)	Daniel Buck (F)	3rd district	4th district
5th (1797–1799)	Matthew Lyon (DR)	Lewis R. Morris (F)	3rd district	4th district
6th (1799–1801)	Matthew Lyon (DR)	Lewis R. Morris (F)	3rd district	4th district
7th (1801–1803)	Israel Smith (DR)	Lewis R. Morris (F)	3rd district	4th district
8th (1803–1805)	Gideon Olin (DR)	James Elliott (F)	William Chamberlain (F)	Martin Chittenden (F)
9th (1805–1807)	Gideon Olin (DR)	James Elliott (F)	James Fisk (DR)	Martin Chittenden (F)
10th (1807–1809)	James Witherell (DR) (Note: Representative Witherell resigned from the House on May 1, 1808, to serve as the Territorial Supreme Court justice for the Territory of Michigan.)	James Elliott (F)	James Fisk (DR)	Martin Chittenden (F)
10th (1807–1809)	Samuel Shaw (DR)	James Elliott (F)	James Fisk (DR)	Martin Chittenden (F)
11th (1809–1811)	Samuel Shaw (DR)	Jonathan H. Hubbard (F)	William Chamberlain (F)	Martin Chittenden (F)
12th (1811–1813)	Samuel Shaw (DR)	William Strong (DR)	James Fisk (DR)	Martin Chittenden (F)

=== 1813–1823 ===
Congress	At-large seat A	At-large seat B	At-large seat C	At-large seat D	At-large seat E	At-large seat F
13th (1813–1815)	William C. Bradley (DR)	William Strong (DR)	James Fisk (DR)	Charles Rich (DR)	Richard Skinner (DR)	Ezra Butler (DR)
14th (1815–1817)	Daniel Chipman (F)	Luther Jewett (F)	Chauncey Langdon (F)	Asa Lyon (F)	Charles Marsh (F)	John Noyes (F)
15th (1817–1819)	Orsamus Cook Merrill (DR) (Note: Representative Merrill left the House on January 12, 1820, after his successor, Rollin Carolas Mallary, successfully contested the election.)	Mark Richards (DR)	Charles Rich (DR)	Heman Allen (DR)	Samuel C. Crafts (DR)	William Hunter (DR)
16th (1819–1821)	Orsamus Cook Merrill (DR)	Mark Richards (DR)	Charles Rich (DR)	William Strong (DR)	Samuel C. Crafts (DR)	Ezra Meech (DR)
16th (1819–1821)	Rollin Carolas Mallary (DR)	Mark Richards (DR)	Charles Rich (DR)	William Strong (DR)	Samuel C. Crafts (DR)	Ezra Meech (DR)
Congress	1st district	2nd district	3rd district	4th district	5th district	6th district
17th (1821–1823)	Rollin Carolas Mallary (DR)	Phineas White (DR)	Charles Rich (DR)	Elias Keyes (DR)	Samuel C. Crafts (DR)	John Mattocks (DR)

=== 1823–1825 ===
Congress	At-large seat A	At-large seat B	At-large seat C	At-large seat D	At-large seat E
18th (1823–1825)	William C. Bradley (DR)	Rollin Carolas Mallary (DR)	Samuel C. Crafts (DR)	Henry Olin (DR)	D. Azro A. Buck (DR)

=== 1825–1933 ===
Congress	1st district	2nd district	3rd district	4th district	5th district
19th (1825–1827)	William C. Bradley (NR)	Rollin Carolas; Mallary (NR) (Note: Representative Mallary served from January 13, 1820, when he successfully contested the election of his predecessor, Orsamus C. Merrill, to April 16, 1831, when he died in office.)	George Edward; Wales (NR)	Ezra Meech (J)	John Mattocks (NR)
20th (1827–1829)	Jonathan Hunt (NR) (Note: Representative Hunt died on May 15, 1832, while in office.)	Rollin Carolas; Mallary (NR)	George Edward; Wales (NR)	Benjamin Swift (NR)	D. Azro A. Buck (NR)
21st (1829–1831)	Jonathan Hunt (NR)	Rollin Carolas; Mallary (NR)	Horace Everett (NR)	Benjamin Swift (NR)	William Cahoon (A-M)
22nd (1831–1833)	Jonathan Hunt (NR)	Rollin Carolas; Mallary (NR)	Horace Everett (NR)	Heman Allen (NR)	William Cahoon (A-M)
22nd (1831–1833)	Hiland Hall (NR)	William Slade (A-M)	Horace Everett (NR)	Heman Allen (NR)	William Cahoon (A-M)
23rd (1833–1835)	Hiland Hall (NR)	William Slade (A-M)	Horace Everett (NR)	Heman Allen (NR)	Benjamin Deming (A-M) (Note: Representative Deming died on July 11, 1834, while in office.)
23rd (1833–1835)	Hiland Hall (NR)	William Slade (A-M)	Horace Everett (NR)	Heman Allen (NR)	Henry Fisk; James (A-M)
24th (1835–1837)	Hiland Hall (NR)	William Slade (A-M)	Horace Everett (NR)	Heman Allen (NR)	Henry Fisk; James (A-M)
25th (1837–1839)	Hiland Hall (W)	William Slade (W)	Horace Everett (W)	Heman Allen (W)	Isaac Fletcher (D)
26th (1839–1841)	Hiland Hall (W)	William Slade (W)	Horace Everett (W)	John Smith (D)	Isaac Fletcher (D)
27th (1841–1843)	Hiland Hall (W)	William Slade (W)	Horace Everett (W)	Augustus Young (W)	John Mattocks (W)
28th (1843–1845)	Solomon Foot (W)	Jacob Collamer (W)	George Perkins; Marsh (W) (Note: Representative Marsh resigned in 1849 to serve as Minister Resident to Turkey.)	Paul Dillingham (D)	
29th (1845–1847)	Solomon Foot (W)	Jacob Collamer (W)	George Perkins; Marsh (W)	Paul Dillingham (D)	
30th (1847–1849)	William Henry (W)	Jacob Collamer (W)	George Perkins; Marsh (W)	Lucius Benedict; Peck (D)	
31st (1849–1851)	William Henry (W)	William Hebard (W)	George Perkins; Marsh (W)	Lucius Benedict; Peck (D)	
31st (1849–1851)	William Henry (W)	William Hebard (W)	James Meacham (W)	Lucius Benedict; Peck (D)	
32nd (1851–1853)	Ahiman Louis Miner (W)	William Hebard (W)	James Meacham (W)	Thomas Bartlett Jr. (D)	
33rd (1853–1855)	James Meacham (W)	Andrew Tracy (W)	Alvah Sabin (W)		
34th (1855–1857)	James Meacham (O) (Note: Representative Meacham died on August 23, 1856, while in office.)	Justin S. Morrill (O)	Alvah Sabin (O)		
34th (1855–1857)	George T. Hodges (R)	Justin S. Morrill (O)	Alvah Sabin (O)		
35th (1857–1859)	E. P. Walton (R)	Justin S. Morrill (R)	Homer Elihu; Royce (R)		
36th (1859–1861)	E. P. Walton (R)	Justin S. Morrill (R)	Homer Elihu; Royce (R)		
37th (1861–1863)	E. P. Walton (R)	Justin S. Morrill (R)	Portus Baxter (R)		
38th (1863–1865)	Frederick E. Woodbridge (R)	Justin S. Morrill (R)	Portus Baxter (R)		
39th (1865–1867)	Frederick E. Woodbridge (R)	Justin S. Morrill (R)	Portus Baxter (R)		
40th (1867–1869)	Frederick E. Woodbridge (R)	Luke P. Poland (R)	Worthington C. Smith (R)		
41st (1869–1871)	Charles W. Willard (R)	Luke P. Poland (R)	Worthington C. Smith (R)		
42nd (1871–1873)	Charles W. Willard (R)	Luke P. Poland (R)	Worthington C. Smith (R)		
43rd (1873–1875)	Charles W. Willard (R)	Luke P. Poland (R)	George Whitman; Hendee (R)		
44th (1875–1877)	Charles Herbert; Joyce (R)	Dudley C. Denison (I)	George Whitman; Hendee (R)		
45th (1877–1879)	Charles Herbert; Joyce (R)	Dudley C. Denison (R)	George Whitman; Hendee (R)		
46th (1879–1881)	Charles Herbert; Joyce (R)	James Manning; Tyler (R)	Bradley Barlow (GB)		
47th (1881–1883)	Charles Herbert; Joyce (R)	James Manning; Tyler (R)	William W. Grout (R)		

=== 1883–1933 ===
Members of the House of Representatives from Vermont from 1883 to 1933
Congress	1st district	2nd district
48th (1883–1885)	John Wolcott; Stewart (R)	Luke P. Poland (R)
49th (1885–1887)	John Wolcott; Stewart (R)	William W. Grout (R)
50th (1887–1889)	John Wolcott; Stewart (R)	William W. Grout (R)
51st (1889–1891)	John Wolcott; Stewart (R)	William W. Grout (R)
52nd (1891–1893)	H. Henry Powers (R)	William W. Grout (R)
53rd (1893–1895)	H. Henry Powers (R)	William W. Grout (R)
54th (1895–1897)	H. Henry Powers (R)	William W. Grout (R)
55th (1897–1899)	H. Henry Powers (R)	William W. Grout (R)
56th (1899–1901)	H. Henry Powers (R)	William W. Grout (R)
57th (1901–1903)	David J. Foster (R) (Note: Representative Foster died on March 21, 1912, while in office.)	Kittredge Haskins (R)
58th (1903–1905)	David J. Foster (R)	Kittredge Haskins (R)
59th (1905–1907)	David J. Foster (R)	Kittredge Haskins (R)
60th (1907–1909)	David J. Foster (R)	Kittredge Haskins (R)
61st (1909–1911)	David J. Foster (R)	Frank Plumley (R)
62nd (1911–1913)	David J. Foster (R)	Frank Plumley (R)
62nd (1911–1913)	Frank L. Greene (R)	Frank Plumley (R)
63rd (1913–1915)	Frank L. Greene (R)	Frank Plumley (R)
64th (1915–1917)	Frank L. Greene (R)	Porter H. Dale (R)
65th (1917–1919)	Frank L. Greene (R)	Porter H. Dale (R)
66th (1919–1921)	Frank L. Greene (R)	Porter H. Dale (R)
67th (1921–1923)	Frank L. Greene (R)	Porter H. Dale (R)
68th (1923–1925)	Frederick Fleetwood (R)	Ernest W. Gibson (R)
69th (1925–1927)	Elbert S. Brigham (R)	Ernest W. Gibson (R)
70th (1927–1929)	Elbert S. Brigham (R)	Ernest W. Gibson (R)
71st (1929–1931)	Elbert S. Brigham (R)	Ernest W. Gibson (R)
72nd (1931–1933)	John E. Weeks (R)	Ernest W. Gibson (R)

=== 1933–present ===
Members of the House of Representatives from Vermont from 1933 to present
Congress	At-large representative
73rd (1933–1935)	Ernest W. Gibson (R) (Note: Representative Gibson resigned from the House on October 19, 1933, to serve in the U.S. Senate.)
73rd (1933–1935)	Charles A. Plumley (R)
74th (1935–1937)	Charles A. Plumley (R)
75th (1937–1939)	Charles A. Plumley (R)
76th (1939–1941)	Charles A. Plumley (R)
77th (1941–1943)	Charles A. Plumley (R)
78th (1943–1945)	Charles A. Plumley (R)
79th (1945–1947)	Charles A. Plumley (R)
80th (1947–1949)	Charles A. Plumley (R)
81st (1949–1951)	Charles A. Plumley (R)
82nd (1951–1953)	Winston L. Prouty (R)
83rd (1953–1955)	Winston L. Prouty (R)
84th (1955–1957)	Winston L. Prouty (R)
85th (1957–1959)	Winston L. Prouty (R)
86th (1959–1961)	William H. Meyer (D)
87th (1961–1963)	Robert Stafford (R) (Note: Representative Stafford resigned from the House on September 16, 1971, to serve in the U.S. Senate.)
88th (1963–1965)	Robert Stafford (R)
89th (1965–1967)	Robert Stafford (R)
90th (1967–1969)	Robert Stafford (R)
91st (1969–1971)	Robert Stafford (R)
92nd (1971–1973)	Robert Stafford (R)
92nd (1971–1973)	Richard W. Mallary (R)
93rd (1973–1975)	Richard W. Mallary (R)
94th (1975–1977)	Jim Jeffords (R)
95th (1977–1979)	Jim Jeffords (R)
96th (1979–1981)	Jim Jeffords (R)
97th (1981–1983)	Jim Jeffords (R)
98th (1983–1985)	Jim Jeffords (R)
99th (1985–1987)	Jim Jeffords (R)
100th (1987–1989)	Jim Jeffords (R)
101st (1989–1991)	Peter Plympton Smith (R)
102nd (1991–1993)	Bernie Sanders (I)
103rd (1993–1995)	Bernie Sanders (I)
104th (1995–1997)	Bernie Sanders (I)
105th (1997–1999)	Bernie Sanders (I)
106th (1999–2001)	Bernie Sanders (I)
107th (2001–2003)	Bernie Sanders (I)
108th (2003–2005)	Bernie Sanders (I)
109th (2005–2007)	Bernie Sanders (I)
110th (2007–2009)	Peter Welch (D)
111th (2009–2011)	Peter Welch (D)
112th (2011–2013)	Peter Welch (D)
113th (2013–2015)	Peter Welch (D)
114th (2015–2017)	Peter Welch (D)
115th (2017–2019)	Peter Welch (D)
116th (2019–2021)	Peter Welch (D)
117th (2021–2023)	Peter Welch (D)
118th (2023–2025)	Becca Balint (D)
119th (2025–2027)	Becca Balint (D)
120th (2027–2029)	Becca Balint (D)

== Key ==
Anti-Administration (AA)
Anti-Masonic (A-M)
Democratic (D)
Democratic-Republican (DR)
Federalist (F)
Pro-Administration (PA)
Free Soil (FS)
Greenback (GB)
Independent Democrat (ID)
Jacksonian (J)
National Republican (NR)
Opposition Northern (O)
Republican (R)
Whig (W)

== See also ==
- List of United States congressional districts
- Vermont's congressional districts
- Political party strength in Vermont
