= List of United States representatives from Vermont =

The following is an alphabetical list of United States representatives from the state of Vermont. For chronological tables of members of both houses of the United States Congress from the state (through the present day), see Vermont's congressional delegations. The list of names should be complete, but other data may be incomplete.

== Current representative ==
Current as of January 3, 2025.

- Vermont's at-large district: Becca Balint (D) (since 2023)

== List of members ==
Members	Party	Years	District	Notes
Heman Allen (of Colchester)	Democratic-Republican	March 4, 1817 – April 20, 1818	At-large	Elected in 1816. Resigned to become a U.S. Marshall.
Heman Allen (of Milton)	Anti-Jacksonian	March 4, 1831 – March 3, 1837	4th	Elected in 1832. Switched parties.
Heman Allen (of Milton)	Whig	March 4, 1837 – March 3, 1839	4th	Re-elected in 1836 as a Whig. Lost re-election to J. Smith.
Becca Balint	Democratic	January 3, 2023 – present	At-large	Elected in 2022. Incumbent
Bradley Barlow	Greenback	March 4, 1879 – March 3, 1881	3rd	Elected in 1878. Lost re-election to Grout.
Thomas Bartlett Jr.	Democratic	March 4, 1851 – March 3, 1853	4th	Elected in 1850. Redistricted to the 2nd district and lost re-election to Tracy.
Portus Baxter	Republican	March 4, 1861 – March 3, 1867	3rd	Elected in 1860. Retired.
William C. Bradley	Democratic-Republican	March 4, 1813 – March 3, 1815	At-large	Elected in 1812. Lost re-election to Chipman.
William C. Bradley	Democratic-Republican	March 4, 1823 – March 3, 1825	2nd	Elected in 1822. Redistricted to the 1st district.
William C. Bradley	Anti-Jacksonian	March 4, 1825 – March 3, 1827	1st	Redistricted from the at-large district and re-elected in 1824. Lost re-election to Hunt.
Elbert S. Brigham	Republican	March 4, 1925 – March 3, 1931	1st	Elected in 1924. Retired.
Daniel Buck	Federalist	March 4, 1795 – March 3, 1797	2nd	Elected in 1795. Re-elected in 1797 but declined the seat.
Daniel A. A. Buck	Democratic-Republican	March 4, 1823 – March 3, 1825	4th	Elected in 1822. Retired.
Daniel A. A. Buck	Anti-Jacksonian	March 4, 1827 – March 3, 1829	5th	Elected in 1826. Lost re-election to Cahoon.
Ezra Butler	Democratic-Republican	March 4, 1813 – March 3, 1815	At-large	Elected in 1812. Lost re-election to Noyes.
William Cahoon	Anti-Masonic	March 4, 1829 – March 3, 1833	5th	Elected in 1829. Lost re-election to Deming.
William Chamberlain	Federalist	March 4, 1803 – March 3, 1805	3rd	Elected in 1802. Lost re-election to Fisk.
William Chamberlain	Federalist	March 4, 1809 – March 3, 1811	3rd	Elected in 1808. Lost re-election to Fisk.
Daniel Chipman	Federalist	March 4, 1815 – May 5, 1816	At-large	Elected in 1814. Resigned due to illness.
Martin Chittenden	Federalist	March 4, 1803 – March 3, 1813	4th	Elected in 1803. Retired to run for Governor of Vermont.
Jacob Collamer	Whig	March 4, 1843 – March 3, 1849	2nd	Elected in 1843. Resigned to become U.S. Postmaster General.
Samuel C. Crafts	Democratic-Republican	March 4, 1817 – March 3, 1821	At-large	Elected in 1816. Redistricted to the 5th district.
Samuel C. Crafts	Democratic-Republican	March 4, 1821 – March 3, 1823	5th	Redistricted from the at-large district and re-elected in 1820. Redistricted to the at-large district.
Samuel C. Crafts	Democratic-Republican	March 4, 1823 – March 3, 1825	At-large	Redistricted from the 5th district and re-elected in 1822. Retired.
Porter H. Dale	Republican	March 4, 1915 – August 11, 1923	2nd	Elected in 1914. Resigned to become U.S. senator.
Benjamin F. Deming	Anti-Masonic	March 4, 1833 – July 11, 1834	5th	Elected in 1833. Died.
Dudley C. Denison	Independent Republican	March 4, 1875 – March 3, 1877	2nd	Elected in 1874. Joined Republican Party.
Dudley C. Denison	Republican	March 4, 1877 – March 3, 1879	2nd	Re-elected in 1876 as a Republican. Retired.
Paul Dillingham	Democratic	March 4, 1843 – March 3, 1847	4th	Elected in 1843. Retired.
James Elliot	Federalist	March 4, 1797 – March 3, 1803	2nd	Elected in 1803. Retired.
Horace Everett	Anti-Jacksonian	March 4, 1829 – March 3, 1837	3rd	Elected in 1828. Switched parties.
Horace Everett	Whig	March 4, 1837 – March 3, 1843	3rd	Re-elected in 1836 as a Whig. Retired to run for U.S. Senator.
James Fisk	Democratic-Republican	March 4, 1805 – March 3, 1809	3rd	Elected in 1805. Lost re-election to Chamberlain.
James Fisk	Democratic-Republican	March 4, 1811 – March 3, 1813	3rd	Elected in 1810. Redistricted to the at-large district.
James Fisk	Democratic-Republican	March 4, 1813 – March 3, 1815	At-large	Redistricted from the 3rd district and re-elected in 1812. Lost re-election to Langdon.
Frederick G. Fleetwood	Republican	March 4, 1923 – March 3, 1925	1st	Elected in 1922. Retired.
Isaac Fletcher	Democratic	March 4, 1837 – March 3, 1841	5th	Elected in 1836. Lost re-election to Mattocks.
Solomon Foot	Whig	March 4, 1843 – March 3, 1847	1st	Elected in 1843. Retired.
David J. Foster	Republican	March 4, 1901 – March 21, 1912	1st	Elected in 1900. Died.
Ernest W. Gibson	Republican	November 6, 1923 – March 3, 1933	2nd	Elected to finish Dale's term. Redistricted to the at-large district.
Ernest W. Gibson	Republican	March 4, 1933 – October 19, 1933	At-large	Redistricted from the 2nd district and re-elected in 1932. Resigned when appointed U.S. senator.
Frank L. Greene	Republican	July 30, 1912 – March 3, 1923	1st	Elected to finish Foster's term. Retired to run for U.S. senator.
William W. Grout	Republican	March 4, 1881 – March 3, 1883	3rd	Elected in 1880. Redistricted to the 2nd district and lost renomination to Poland.
William W. Grout	Republican	March 4, 1885 – March 3, 1901	2nd	Elected in 1884. Retired.
Hiland Hall	Anti-Jacksonian	January 1, 1833 – March 3, 1837	1st	Elected to finish Hunt's term. Switched parties.
Hiland Hall	Whig	March 4, 1837 – March 3, 1843	1st	Re-elected in 1836 as a Whig. Retired to become State Banking Commissioner.
Kittredge Haskins	Republican	March 4, 1901 – March 3, 1909	2nd	Elected in 1900. Lost renomination to F. Plumley.
William Hebard	Whig	March 4, 1849 – March 3, 1853	2nd	Elected in 1848. Retired.
George W. Hendee	Republican	March 4, 1873 – March 3, 1879	3rd	Elected in 1872. Lost re-election to Barlow.
William Henry	Whig	March 4, 1847 – March 3, 1851	1st	Elected in 1846. Lost re-election to Miner.
George T. Hodges	Republican	December 1, 1856 – March 3, 1857	1st	Elected to finish Meacham's term. Retired.
Jonathan H. Hubbard	Federalist	March 4, 1809 – March 3, 1811	2nd	Elected in 1808. Lost re-election to Strong.
Jonathan Hunt	Anti-Jacksonian	March 4, 1827 – May 15, 1832	1st	Elected in 1827. Died.
William Hunter	Democratic-Republican	March 4, 1817 – March 3, 1819	At-large	Elected in 1816. Retired.
Henry F. Janes	Anti-Masonic	December 2, 1834 – March 3, 1837	5th	Also elected to finish Deming's term. Lost re-election to Fletcher.
Jim Jeffords	Republican	January 3, 1975 – January 3, 1989	At-large	Elected in 1974. Retired to run for U.S. senator.
Luther Jewett	Federalist	March 4, 1815 – March 3, 1817	At-large	Elected in 1814. Retired.
Charles H. Joyce	Republican	March 4, 1875 – March 3, 1883	1st	Elected in 1874. Retired.
Elias Keyes	Democratic-Republican	March 4, 1821 – March 3, 1823	4th	Elected in 1820. Redistricted to the at-large district and lost re-election to Mallary, Crafts, Rich, Buck, and Bradley.
Chauncey Langdon	Federalist	March 4, 1815 – March 3, 1817	At-large	Elected in 1814. Lost re-election to Rich.
Asa Lyon	Federalist	March 4, 1815 – March 3, 1817	At-large	Elected in 1814. Lost re-election to Allen.
Matthew Lyon	Democratic-Republican	March 4, 1797 – March 3, 1801	1st	Elected in 1797. Retired.
Richard W. Mallary	Republican	January 7, 1972 – January 3, 1975	At-large	Elected to finish Stafford's term. Retired to run for U.S. senator.
Rollin C. Mallary	Democratic-Republican	January 13, 1820 – March 3, 1821	At-large	Won election contest. Redistricted to the 1st district.
Rollin C. Mallary	Democratic-Republican	March 4, 1821 – March 3, 1823	1st	Redistricted from the at-large district and re-elected in 1820. Redistricted to the at-large district.
Rollin C. Mallary	Democratic-Republican	March 4, 1823 – March 3, 1825	At-large	Redistricted from the 1st district and re-elected in 1822. Redistricted to the 2nd district.
Rollin C. Mallary	Anti-Jacksonian	March 4, 1825 – April 15, 1831	2nd	Elected in 1824. Died.
Charles Marsh	Federalist	March 4, 1815 – March 3, 1817	At-large	Elected in 1814. Retired.
George Perkins Marsh	Whig	March 4, 1843 – May 29, 1849	2nd	Elected in 1843. Resigned to become U.S. Minister resident to Turkey.
John Mattocks	Democratic-Republican	March 4, 1821 – March 3, 1823	6th	Elected in 1820. Redistricted to the at-large district and lost re-election to Mallary, Crafts, Rich, Buck, and Bradley.
John Mattocks	Anti-Jacksonian	March 4, 1825 – March 3, 1827	5th	Elected in 1824. Retired.
John Mattocks	Whig	March 4, 1841 – March 3, 1843	5th	Elected in 1840. Retired to run for Governor of Vermont.
James Meacham	Whig	December 3, 1849 – March 3, 1853	3rd	Elected to finish Marsh's term. Redistricted to the 1st district.
James Meacham	Whig	March 4, 1853 – March 3, 1855	1st	Redistricted from the 3rd district and re-elected in 1852. Switched parties.
James Meacham	Opposition	March 4, 1855 – August 23, 1856	1st	Re-elected in 1854 as an Opposition Party candidate. Died.
Ezra Meech	Democratic-Republican	March 4, 1819 – March 3, 1821	At-large	Re-elected in 1818. Lost re-election.
Ezra Meech	Jacksonian	March 4, 1825 – March 3, 1827	4th	Elected in 1824. Lost re-election to Swift.
Orsamus C. Merrill	Democratic-Republican	March 4, 1817 – January 12, 1820	At-large	Elected in 1816. Re-elected in 1818 but election overturned.
William H. Meyer	Democratic	January 3, 1959 – January 3, 1961	At-large	Elected in 1958. Lost re-election to Stafford.
Ahiman L. Miner	Whig	March 4, 1851 – March 3, 1853	1st	Elected in 1850. Retired.
Justin S. Morrill	Whig	March 4, 1855 – March 3, 1857	2nd	Elected in 1854. Switched parties.
Justin S. Morrill	Republican	March 4, 1857 – March 3, 1867	2nd	Re-elected in 1856 as a Republican. Retired to run for U.S. senator.
Lewis R. Morris	Federalist	May 24, 1797 – March 3, 1803	2nd	Elected to finish Buck's term. Lost re-election to Elliot.
Nathaniel Niles	Anti-Administration	October 17, 1791 – March 3, 1795	2nd	Elected in 1791. Lost re-election to Buck.
John Noyes	Federalist	March 4, 1815 – March 3, 1817	At-large	Elected in 1814. Retired.
Gideon Olin	Democratic-Republican	March 4, 1803 – March 3, 1807	1st	Elected in 1802. Retired.
Henry Olin	Democratic-Republican	December 13, 1824 – March 3, 1825	3rd	Elected to finish Rich's term. Retired.
Lucius B. Peck	Democratic	March 4, 1847 – March 3, 1851	4th	Elected in 1846. Retired to run for Governor of Vermont.
Charles A. Plumley	Republican	January 16, 1934 – January 3, 1951	At-large	Elected to finish Gibson's term. Retired.
Frank Plumley	Republican	March 4, 1909 – March 3, 1915	2nd	Elected in 1908. Retired.
Luke P. Poland	Republican	March 4, 1867 – March 3, 1875	2nd	Elected in 1866. Lost re-election to Denison.
Luke P. Poland	Republican	March 4, 1883 – March 3, 1885	2nd	Elected in 1882. Retired.
H. Henry Powers	Republican	March 4, 1891 – March 3, 1901	1st	Elected in 1890. Lost re-election to Foster.
Winston L. Prouty	Republican	January 3, 1951 – January 3, 1959	At-large	Elected in 1950. Retired to run for U.S. senator.
Charles Rich	Democratic-Republican	March 4, 1813 – March 3, 1815	At-large	Elected in 1812. Lost re-election to Lyon.
Charles Rich	Democratic-Republican	March 4, 1817 – March 3, 1821	At-large	Elected in 1816. Redistricted to the 3rd district.
Charles Rich	Democratic-Republican	March 4, 1821 – March 3, 1823	3rd	Redistricted from the at-large district and re-elected in 1821. Redistricted to the at-large district.
Charles Rich	Democratic-Republican	March 4, 1823 – October 15, 1824	3rd	Redistricted from the 3rd district and re-elected in 1822. Died.
Mark Richards	Democratic-Republican	March 4, 1817 – March 3, 1821	At-large	Elected in 1816. Redistricted to the 2nd district and lost re-election to White.
Homer E. Royce	Republican	March 4, 1857 – March 3, 1861	3rd	Elected in 1856. Retired.
Alvah Sabin	Whig	March 4, 1853 – March 3, 1855	3rd	Elected in 1852. Switched parties.
Alvah Sabin	Opposition	March 4, 1855 – March 3, 1857	3rd	Re-elected in 1854 as an Opposition Party candidate. Retired.
Bernie Sanders	Independent	January 3, 1991 – January 3, 2007	At-large	Elected in 1990. Retired to run for U.S. senator.
Samuel Shaw	Democratic-Republican	September 6, 1808 – March 3, 1813	1st	Elected to finish Witherell's term. Retired to join the military.
Richard Skinner	Democratic-Republican	March 4, 1813 – March 3, 1815	At-large	Elected in 1812. Lost re-election to Marsh.
William Slade	Anti-Masonic	November 1, 1831 – March 3, 1837	2nd	Elected to finish Mallary's term. Switched parties.
William Slade	Whig	March 4, 1837 – March 3, 1843	2nd	Re-elected in 1836 as a Whig. Resigned to become Reporter of the Vermont Supreme Court.
Israel Smith	Anti-Administration	October 17, 1791 – March 3, 1795	1st	Elected in 1791. Switched parties.
Israel Smith	Democratic-Republican	March 4, 1795 – March 3, 1797	1st	Re-elected in 1795 as a Democratic-Republican. Lost re-election to M. Lyon.
Israel Smith	Democratic-Republican	March 4, 1801 – March 3, 1803	1st	Elected in 1800. Retired to run for U.S. senator.
John Smith	Democratic	March 4, 1839 – March 3, 1841	4th	Elected in 1838. Lost re-election to Young.
Peter P. Smith	Republican	January 3, 1989 – January 3, 1991	At-large	Elected in 1988. Lost re-election to Sanders.
Worthington C. Smith	Republican	March 4, 1867 – March 3, 1873	3rd	Elected in 1866. Retired.
Robert Stafford	Republican	January 3, 1961 – September 16, 1971	At-large	Elected in 1960. Resigned after being appointed to the US Senate
John W. Stewart	Republican	March 4, 1883 – March 3, 1891	1st	Elected in 1882. Retired.
William Strong	Democratic-Republican	March 4, 1811 – March 3, 1813	2nd	Elected in 1810. Redistricted to the at-large district.
William Strong	Democratic-Republican	March 4, 1813 – March 3, 1815	At-large	Redistricted from the 2nd district and re-elected in 1812. Lost re-election to Jewett.
William Strong	Democratic-Republican	March 4, 1819 – March 3, 1821	At-large	Elected in 1818. Redistricted to the 4th district and lost re-election.
Benjamin Swift	Anti-Jacksonian	March 4, 1827 – March 3, 1829	4th	Elected in 1827. Retired.
Benjamin Swift	Anti-Jacksonian	March 4, 1829 – March 3, 1831	4th	[data missing]
Andrew Tracy	Whig	March 4, 1853 – March 3, 1855	2nd	Elected in 1852. Retired.
James M. Tyler	Republican	March 4, 1879 – March 3, 1883	2nd	Elected in 1878. Retired.
George E. Wales	Anti-Jacksonian	March 4, 1825 – March 3, 1829	3rd	Elected in 1824. Lost re-election to Everett.
Eliakim P. Walton	Republican	March 4, 1857 – March 3, 1863	1st	Elected in 1856. Retired.
John E. Weeks	Republican	March 4, 1931 – March 3, 1933	1st	Elected in 1930. Retired.
Peter Welch	Democratic	January 3, 2007 – January 3, 2023	At-large	Elected in 2006. Retired to run for U.S. senator.
Phineas White	Democratic-Republican	March 4, 1821 – March 3, 1823	2nd	Elected in 1821. Retired.
Charles W. Willard	Republican	March 4, 1869 – March 3, 1875	1st	Elected in 1868. Lost re-election to Joyce.
James Witherell	Democratic-Republican	March 4, 1807 – May 1, 1808	1st	Elected in 1806. Resigned when appointed to the Michigan Territory Supreme Court.
Frederick E. Woodbridge	Republican	March 4, 1863 – March 3, 1869	1st	Elected in 1862. Retired.
Augustus Young	Whig	March 4, 1841 – March 3, 1843	4th	Elected in 1840. Retired.

== See also ==
- List of United States senators from Vermont
- Vermont's congressional delegations
- Vermont's congressional districts
