= 1824 United States House of Representatives elections in Vermont =

1822 United States House of Representatives election in Vermont
- September 7, 1824 and December 6, 1824

All 5 Vermont seats to the United States House of Representatives
	Majority party	Minority party
Party	Anti-Jacksonian	Jacksonian
Last election	0	0
Seats won	4	1
Seat change	▲4	▲1

Vermont elected its members September 7, 1824. Congressional districts were re-established in Vermont for the 1824 election. Vermont had used an at-large district 1812-1818 and 1822. A majority was required for election, which was not met in the 1st district, necessitating a second election December 6, 1824.

District	Incumbent			This race	
District	Member	Party	First elected	Results	Candidates
Vermont 1	William C. Bradley; Redistricted from the at-large district	Adams-Clay Democratic-Republican	1812; 1814 (Lost); 1822	Incumbent re-elected as Anti-Jacksonian.	First ballot (September 7, 1824): William C. Bradley (Anti-Jacksonian) 49.8%; Phineas White (Federalist) 36.9%; Calvin Sheldon (Democratic-Republican) 10.7%; Others 2.6%; Second ballot (December 6, 1824): ✓ William C. Bradley (Anti-Jacksonian) 62.0%; Phineas White (Federalist) 34.9%; Others 3.1%
Vermont 2	Rollin C. Mallary; Redistricted from the at-large district	Adams-Clay Democratic-Republican	1818	Incumbent re-elected as Anti-Jacksonian.	✓ Rollin C. Mallary (Anti-Jacksonian) 95.6%; Charles K. Williams (Democratic-Republican) 2.2%; Charles Rich (Democratic-Republican) 1.0%; Others 1.3%
Vermont 2	Charles Rich; Redistricted from the at-large district	Adams-Clay Democratic-Republican	1812; 1814 (Lost); 1816	Unknown if incumbent retired or lost re-election. Democratic-Republican loss. Incumbent then died October 15, 1824, leading to a special election.	✓ Rollin C. Mallary (Anti-Jacksonian) 95.6%; Charles K. Williams (Democratic-Republican) 2.2%; Charles Rich (Democratic-Republican) 1.0%; Others 1.3%
Vermont 3	None (District created)			New seat. New member elected. Anti-Jacksonian gain.	✓ George E. Wales (Anti-Jacksonian) 69.3%; Horace Everett (Federalist) 23.9%; Elias Keyes (Democratic-Republican) 4.8%; Others 1.3%
Vermont 4	Samuel C. Crafts; Redistricted from the at-large district	Adams-Clay Democratic-Republican	1816	Incumbent lost re-election. New member elected. Jacksonian gain.	✓ Ezra Meech (Jacksonian) 54.6%; Benjamin Swift (Anti-Jacksonian) 32.4%; Stephen Royce 7.2%; Herman Allen (Federalist) 3.6%; Samuel C. Crafts 0.6%; Others 1.7%
Vermont 5	Daniel A. A. Buck; Redistricted from the at-large district	Adams-Clay Democratic-Republican	1822	Incumbent lost re-election. New member elected. Anti-Jacksonian gain.	✓ John Mattocks (Anti-Jacksonian) 51.9%; Daniel A. A. Buck (Adams-Clay Democratic-Republican) 46.4%; Others 1.7%

== See also ==
- 1824 Vermont's at-large congressional district special election
- 1824 and 1825 United States House of Representatives elections
- List of United States representatives from Vermont
