= Vermont's congressional districts =

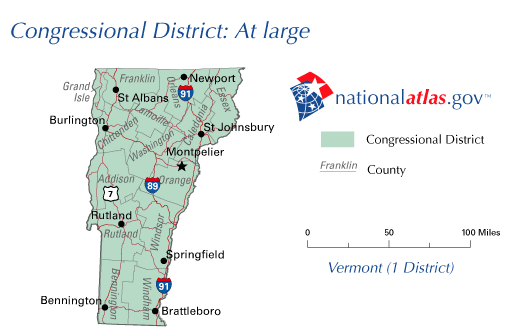

The U.S. state of Vermont currently has one congressional district, whose representative in the United States House of Representatives is elected statewide at-large. At one time, however, it had as many as six districts.

== Current district and representative ==
Current U.S. representatives from Vermont
District	Member (Residence)	Party	Incumbent since	CPVI (2025)	District map
At-large	Becca Balint (Brattleboro)	Democratic	January 3, 2023	D+17	

== Obsolete districts ==
- 1st district, obsolete since reapportionment after the 1930 census
- 2nd district, obsolete since reapportionment after the 1930 census
- 3rd district, obsolete since reapportionment after the 1880 census
- 4th district, obsolete since reapportionment after the 1850 census
- 5th district, obsolete since reapportionment after the 1840 census
- 6th district, only used from 1821 to 1823, and obsolete since reapportionment after the 1820 census
