= 1797 Vermont's 2nd congressional district special election =

- May 23, 1797
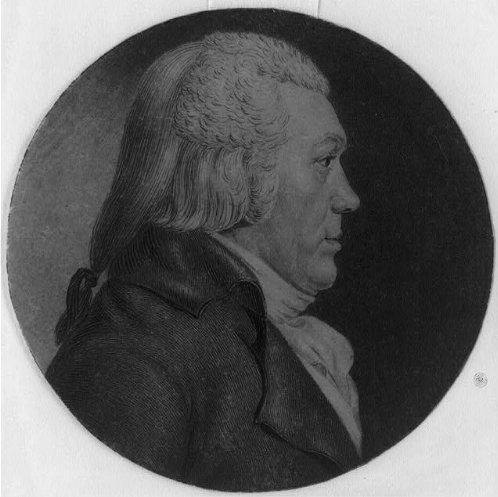
Candidate	Lewis R. Morris	Stephen Jacob
Party	Federalist	Federalist
Popular vote	1,033	246
Percentage	56.9%	13.6%
Candidate	Nathaniel Niles	Amasa Paine
Party	Democratic-Republican	Federalist
Popular vote	203	119
Percentage	11.2%	6.6%
Representative before election
Daniel Buck
Federalist
Elected Representative
Lewis R. Morris
Federalist

A special election was held in Vermont's 2nd congressional district on May 23, 1797, to fill a vacancy left by Daniel Buck (F) declining to serve the term to which he had been re-elected in the previous election.

== Election results ==
1797 Vermont's 2nd congressional district special election
Party	Candidate	Votes	%
Federalist	Lewis R. Morris	1,033	56.91%
Federalist	Stephen Jacob	246	13.55%
Democratic-Republican	Nathaniel Niles	203	11.18%
Federalist	Amasa Paine	119	6.56%
	Scattering	214	11.79%
Total votes		1,815	100.00%
Federalist hold			

== See also ==
- List of special elections to the United States House of Representatives
