= 1808 United States House of Representatives elections in Vermont =

- September 6, 1808 and December 13, 1808

All 4 Vermont seats to the United States House of Representatives
	Majority party	Minority party
Party	Federalist	Democratic-Republican
Last election	2	2
Seats won	3	1
Seat change	▲1	▼1

Following the September 1808 election for delegates to represent Vermont in the 11th United States Congress, two of its four districts had failed to choose representatives. A second ballot was held in December, giving Vermont a total of three Federalist representatives and one Democratic-Republican.

District	Incumbent	Party	First elected	Result	Candidates
Vermont 1 "Southwestern district"	James Witherell	Democratic-Republican	1806	Incumbent resigned May 1, 1808. New member elected. Democratic-Republican hold.	√ Samuel Shaw (Democratic-Republican) (Note: Numbers of votes missing or incomplete in source); Nathan Robinson (Federalist); Chauncey Langdon (Federalist); Jonas Galusha (Democratic-Republican)
Vermont 2 "Southeastern district"	James Elliot	Federalist	1802	Incumbent retired. New member elected. Federalist hold.	First ballot (September 6, 1808): Jonathan H. Hubbard (Federalist) 45.4% Aaron Leland (Democratic-Republican) 36.2% William Czar Bradley (Democratic-Republican) 14.5% Others 4.0% Second ballot (December 13, 1808): √ Jonathan H. Hubbard (Federalist) 51.6% Aaron Leland (Democratic-Republican) 42.2% William Czar Bradley (Democratic-Republican) 4.3% Elias Keyes (Democratic-Republican) 1.4%
Vermont 3 "Northeastern district"	James Fisk	Democratic-Republican	1802	Lost re-election. New member elected. Federalist gain.	First ballot (September 6, 1808): Jedediah Buckingham (Federalist) 47.9% James Fisk (Democratic-Republican) 47.4% William Chamberlain (Federalist) 2.3% Others 2.3% Second ballot (December 13, 1808): √ William Chamberlain (Federalist) 51.5% James Fisk (Democratic-Republican) 47.7% Others 0.8%
Vermont 4 "Northwestern district"	Martin Chittenden	Federalist	1802	Incumbent re-elected.	√ Martin Chittenden (Federalist) 59.9% Ezra Butler (Democratic-Republican) 37.6% Others 2.5%

== See also ==
- United States House of Representatives elections, 1808 and 1809
- List of United States representatives from Vermont
