= 17th United States Congress =

1821-1823 U.S. Congress

←	16th	18th	→
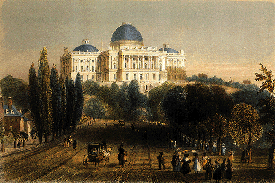
- United States Capitol (1827)

Overview
- Legislative body: United States Congress
- Jurisdiction: United States
- Term: March 4, 1821 – March 4, 1823

Senate
- Members: 48
- President: Daniel D. Tompkins (DR)
- President pro tempore: John Gaillard (DR)
- Party control: Democratic-Republican

House of Representatives
- Members: 187 representatives 3 non-voting delegates
- Speaker: Philip P. Barbour (DR)
- Party control: Democratic-Republican

Sessions
- 1st: December 3, 1821 – May 8, 1822
- 2nd: December 2, 1822 – March 3, 1823

The 17th United States Congress was a meeting of the legislative branch of the United States federal government, consisting of the United States Senate and the United States House of Representatives. While its term was officially March 4, 1821, to March 4, 1823, during the fifth and sixth years of James Monroe's presidency, its first session began on December 3, 1821, ending on May 8, 1822, and its second session began on December 2, 1822, to March 3, 1823. The apportionment of seats in the House of Representatives was based on the 1810 United States census. Both chambers had a Democratic-Republican majority.

The members William Smith, John Gaillard, Joseph Gist, John Wilson, George McDuffie, Starling Tucker, James Overstreet, Thomas R. Mitchell, William Lowndes, Joel Roberts Poinsett, and James Blair were described as being "outspokenly pro-British" in their outlook. All of whom signed a "letter of brotherhood and solidarity" addressed to British Prime Minister Robert Jenkinson, 2nd Earl of Liverpool and the British Secretary of State for Foreign Affairs Robert Stewart, Viscount Castlereagh in 1822. The same letter harshly condemned the actions of France and specifically those of King Louis XVIII.

== Major events ==
- March 5, 1821: Second inauguration of James Monroe as President of the United States.
- July 10, 1821: In accordance with the terms of the 1819 Adams–Onís Treaty, sovereignty over Spanish Florida is officially transferred to the United States from Spain.
- December 3–4, 1821: The election for the House speakership takes 12 ballots.

== States admitted and territories organized ==
- August 10, 1821: Missouri was admitted as the 24th U.S. state
- March 30, 1822: Florida Territory was formed from the lands ceded by Spain known by the name East and West Florida

== Party summary ==
The count below identifies party affiliations at the beginning of the first session of this congress. Changes resulting from subsequent replacements are shown below in the "Changes in membership" section.

=== Senate ===
During this congress, two Senate seats were added for the new state of Missouri.

	Party (shading shows control)		Total	Vacant
	Democratic- Republican (DR)	Federalist (F)	Total	Vacant
End of previous congress	38	8	46	0
Begin	39	4	43	3
End	43	4	47	1
Final voting share	91.5%	8.5%		
Beginning of next congress	42	3	45	3

=== House of Representatives ===
For the beginning of this congress, six seats from Massachusetts were reapportioned to the new state of Maine (one seat had already moved during the previous congress), 3 Stat. 555. During this congress, one House seat was added for the new state of Missouri, 3 Stat. 547.

	Party (shading shows control)		Total	Vacant
	Democratic- Republican (DR)	Federalist (F)	Total	Vacant
End of previous congress	159	24	183	3
Begin	150	31	181	5
End	154	31	185	2
Final voting share	83.2%	16.8%		
Beginning of next congress	188	24	212	1

== Leadership ==
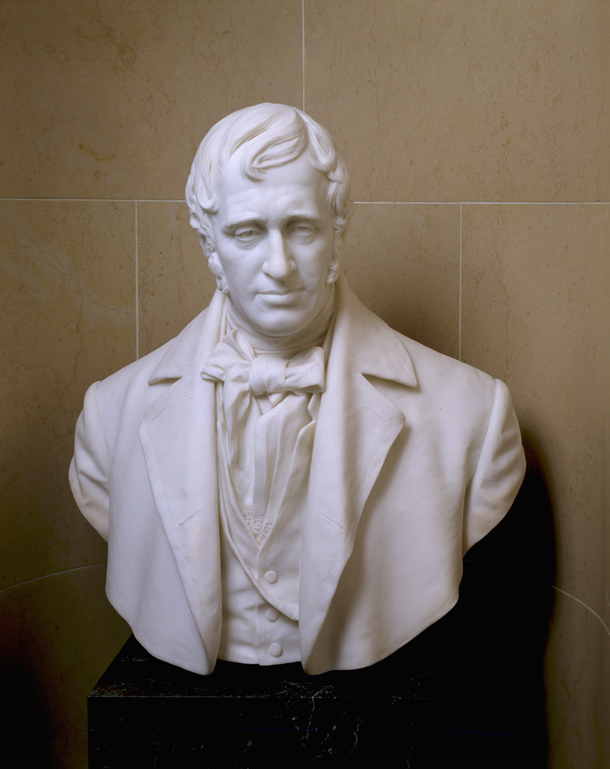
President of the Senate Daniel D. Tompkins

=== Senate ===
- President: Daniel D. Tompkins (DR)
- President pro tempore: John Gaillard (DR), elected December 3, 1821

=== House of Representatives ===
- Speaker: Philip P. Barbour (DR), elected December 4, 1821, on the 12th ballot

== Members ==
This list is arranged by chamber, then by state. Senators are listed by class, and representatives are listed by district.

Skip to House of Representatives, below

=== Senate ===
Senators were elected by the state legislatures every two years, with one-third beginning new six-year terms with each Congress. Preceding the names in the list below are Senate class numbers, which indicate the cycle of their election. In this Congress, Class 1 meant their term began with this Congress, requiring reelection in 1826; Class 2 meant their term ended with this Congress, requiring reelection in 1822; and Class 3 meant their term began in the last Congress, requiring reelection in 1824.

==== Alabama ====
▌2. William R. King (DR)
▌3. John W. Walker (DR), until December 12, 1822

▌William Kelly (DR), from December 12, 1822

==== Connecticut ====
▌1. Elijah Boardman (DR)
▌3. James Lanman (DR)

==== Delaware ====
▌1. Caesar A. Rodney (DR), January 24, 1822 – January 29, 1823, vacant for remainder of term
▌2. Nicholas Van Dyke (F)

==== Georgia ====
▌2. Freeman Walker (DR), until August 6, 1821

▌Nicholas Ware (DR), from November 10, 1821

▌3. John Elliott (DR)

==== Illinois ====
▌2. Jesse B. Thomas (DR)
▌3. Ninian Edwards (DR)

==== Indiana ====
▌1. James Noble (DR)
▌3. Waller Taylor (DR)

==== Kentucky ====
▌2. Richard M. Johnson (DR)
▌3. Isham Talbot (DR)

==== Louisiana ====
▌2. Henry Johnson (DR)
▌3. James Brown (DR)

==== Maine ====
▌1. John Holmes (DR)
▌2. John Chandler (DR)

==== Maryland ====
▌1. William Pinkney (DR), until February 25, 1822

▌Samuel Smith (DR), from December 17, 1822

▌3. Edward Lloyd (DR)

==== Massachusetts ====
▌1. Elijah H. Mills (F)
▌2. Harrison Gray Otis (F), until May 30, 1822

▌James Lloyd (F), from June 5, 1822

==== Mississippi ====
▌1. David Holmes (DR)
▌2. Thomas H. Williams (DR)

==== Missouri ====
▌1. Thomas H. Benton (DR), from August 10, 1821 (newly admitted state)
▌3. David Barton (DR), from August 10, 1821 (newly admitted state)

==== New Hampshire ====
▌2. David L. Morril (DR)
▌3. John F. Parrott (DR)

==== New Jersey ====
▌1. Samuel L. Southard (DR)
▌2. Mahlon Dickerson (DR)

==== New York ====
▌1. Martin Van Buren (DR)
▌3. Rufus King (F)

==== North Carolina ====
▌2. Montfort Stokes (DR)
▌3. Nathaniel Macon (DR)

==== Ohio ====
▌1. Benjamin Ruggles (DR)
▌3. William A. Trimble (DR), until December 13, 1821

▌Ethan Allen Brown (DR), from January 3, 1822

==== Pennsylvania ====
▌1. William Findlay (DR), from December 10, 1821
▌3. Walter Lowrie (DR)

==== Rhode Island ====
▌1. James DeWolf (DR)
▌2. Nehemiah R. Knight (DR)

==== South Carolina ====
▌2. William Smith (DR)
▌3. John Gaillard (DR)

==== Tennessee ====
▌1. John H. Eaton (DR), from September 27, 1821
▌2. John Williams (DR)

==== Vermont ====
▌1. Horatio Seymour (DR)
▌3. William A. Palmer (DR)

==== Virginia ====
▌1. James Barbour (DR)
▌2. James Pleasants (DR), until December 15, 1822

▌John Taylor of Caroline (DR), from December 18, 1822

Senators' party membership by state at the opening of the 17th Congress in March 1821. Missouri's senators were not seated until August 10, 1821. 2 Democratic-Republicans 1 Democratic-Republican and 1 Federalist 2 Federalists

=== House of Representatives ===
The names of representatives are preceded by their district numbers.

==== Alabama ====
▌At-large. Gabriel Moore (DR)

==== Connecticut ====
All representatives were elected statewide on a general ticket.

▌At-large. Noyes Barber (DR)
▌At-large. Daniel Burrows (DR)
▌At-large. Henry W. Edwards (DR)
▌At-large. John Russ (DR)
▌At-large. Ansel Sterling (DR)
▌At-large. Ebenezer Stoddard (DR)
▌At-large. Gideon Tomlinson (DR)

==== Delaware ====
Both representatives were elected statewide on a general ticket.

▌At-large. Louis McLane (F)
▌At-large. Caesar A. Rodney (DR), until January 24, 1822

▌Daniel Rodney (F), from October 1, 1822

==== Georgia ====
All representatives were elected statewide on a general ticket.

▌At-large. Joel Abbot (DR)
▌At-large. Alfred Cuthbert (DR)
▌At-large. George R. Gilmer (DR)
▌At-large. Robert R. Reid (DR)
▌At-large. Edward F. Tattnall (DR)
▌At-large. Wiley Thompson (DR)

==== Illinois ====
▌At-large. Daniel P. Cook (DR)

==== Indiana ====
▌At-large. William Hendricks (DR), until July 25, 1822

▌Jonathan Jennings (DR), from December 2, 1822

==== Kentucky ====
▌1. David Trimble (DR)
▌2. Samuel H. Woodson (DR)
▌3. John T. Johnson (DR)
▌4. Thomas Metcalfe (DR)
▌5. Anthony New (DR)
▌6. Francis Johnson (DR)
▌7. George Robertson (DR), until sometime in 1821 before the convening of Congress

▌John S. Smith (DR), from August 6, 1821

▌8. Wingfield Bullock (DR), until October 13, 1821

▌James D. Breckinridge (DR), from November 21, 1821

▌9. Thomas Montgomery (DR)
▌10. Benjamin Hardin (DR)

==== Louisiana ====
▌At-large. Josiah S. Johnston (DR)

==== Maine ====
▌1. Joseph Dane (F)
▌2. Ezekiel Whitman (F), until June 1, 1822

▌Mark Harris (DR), from December 2, 1822

▌3. Mark L. Hill (DR)
▌4. William D. Williamson (DR)
▌5. Ebenezer Herrick (DR)
▌6. Joshua Cushman (DR)
▌7. Enoch Lincoln (DR)

==== Maryland ====
The 5th district was a plural district with two representatives.

▌1. Raphael Neale (F)
▌2. Joseph Kent (DR)
▌3. Henry R. Warfield (F)
▌4. John Nelson (DR)
▌5. Peter Little (DR)
▌5. Samuel Smith (DR), until December 17, 1822

▌Isaac McKim (DR), from January 4, 1823

▌6. Jeremiah Cosden (DR), until March 19, 1822

▌Philip Reed (DR), from March 19, 1822

▌7. Robert Wright (DR)
▌8. Thomas Bayly (F)

==== Massachusetts ====
▌1. Benjamin Gorham (DR)
▌2. Gideon Barstow (DR)
▌3. Jeremiah Nelson (F)
▌4. Timothy Fuller (DR)
▌5. Samuel Lathrop (F)
▌6. Samuel C. Allen (F)
▌7. Henry W. Dwight (F)
▌8. Aaron Hobart (DR)
▌9. John Reed Jr. (F)
▌10. Francis Baylies (F)
▌11. Jonathan Russell (DR)
▌12. Lewis Bigelow (F)
▌13. William Eustis (DR)

==== Mississippi ====
▌At-large. Christopher Rankin (DR)

==== Missouri ====
▌At-large. John Scott (DR), from August 10, 1821 (newly admitted state)

==== New Hampshire ====
All representatives were elected statewide on a general ticket.

▌At-large. Josiah Butler (DR)
▌At-large. Matthew Harvey (DR)
▌At-large. Aaron Matson (DR)
▌At-large. William Plumer Jr. (DR)
▌At-large. Nathaniel Upham (DR)
▌At-large. Thomas Whipple Jr. (DR)

==== New Jersey ====
All representatives were elected statewide on a general ticket.

▌At-large. Ephraim Bateman (DR)
▌At-large. George Cassedy (DR)
▌At-large. Lewis Condict (DR)
▌At-large. George Holcombe (DR)
▌At-large. James Matlack (DR)
▌At-large. Samuel Swan (DR)

==== New York ====
There were five plural districts: the 1st, 2nd, 12th, 15th & 20th each had two representatives.

▌1. Cadwallader D. Colden (F), from December 12, 1821
▌1. Silas Wood (F)
▌2. Churchill C. Cambreleng (DR)
▌2. John J. Morgan (DR)
▌3. Jeremiah H. Pierson (DR)
▌4. William W. Van Wyck (DR)
▌5. Walter Patterson (F)
▌6. Selah Tuthill (DR), until September 7, 1821 (Note: Selah Tuthill (DR) was elected in New York's 6th district late in April 1821 and died September 7, 1821 before Congress convened. It is unclear if/when he received his credentials.)

▌Charles Borland Jr. (DR), from December 3, 1821

▌7. Charles H. Ruggles (F)
▌8. Richard McCarty (DR)
▌9. Solomon Van Rensselaer (F), until January 14, 1822

▌Stephen Van Rensselaer (F), from March 12, 1822

▌10. John D. Dickinson (F)
▌11. John W. Taylor (DR)
▌12. Nathaniel Pitcher (DR)
▌12. Reuben H. Walworth (DR)
▌13. John Gebhard (DR)
▌14. Alfred Conkling (DR)
▌15. Samuel Campbell (DR)
▌15. James Hawkes (DR)
▌16. Joseph Kirkland (F)
▌17. Thomas H. Hubbard (DR)
▌18. Micah Sterling (F)
▌19. Elisha Litchfield (DR)
▌20. William B. Rochester (DR)
▌20. David Woodcock (DR)
▌21. Elijah Spencer (DR)
▌22. Albert H. Tracy (DR)

==== North Carolina ====
▌1. Lemuel Sawyer (DR)
▌2. Hutchins G. Burton (DR)
▌3. Thomas H. Hall (DR)
▌4. William S. Blackledge (DR)
▌5. Charles Hooks (DR)
▌6. Weldon N. Edwards (DR)
▌7. Archibald McNeill (F)
▌8. Josiah Crudup (DR)
▌9. Romulus M. Saunders (DR)
▌10. John Long (DR)
▌11. Henry W. Connor (DR)
▌12. Felix Walker (DR)
▌13. Lewis Williams (DR)

==== Ohio ====
▌1. Thomas R. Ross (DR)
▌2. John W. Campbell (DR)
▌3. Levi Barber (DR)
▌4. David Chambers (DR), from October 9, 1821
▌5. Joseph Vance (DR)
▌6. John Sloane (DR)

==== Pennsylvania ====
There were six plural districts: the 2nd, 3rd, 5th, 6th & 10th had two representatives each, and the 1st had four representatives.

▌1. Samuel Edwards (F)
▌1. Joseph Hemphill (F)
▌1. William Milnor (F), until May 8, 1822

▌Thomas Forrest (F), from October 8, 1822

▌1. John Sergeant (F)
▌2. William Darlington (DR)
▌2. Samuel Gross (DR)
▌3. James Buchanan (F)
▌3. John Phillips (F)
▌4. James S. Mitchell (DR)
▌5. John Findlay (DR), from October 9, 1821
▌5. James McSherry (F)
▌6. Samuel Moore (DR), until May 20, 1822

▌Samuel D. Ingham (DR), from October 8, 1822

▌6. Thomas J. Rogers (DR)
▌7. Ludwig Worman (F), until October 17, 1822

▌Daniel Udree (DR), from October 17, 1822

▌8. John Tod (DR)
▌9. John Brown (DR)
▌10. George Denison (DR)
▌10. Thomas Murray Jr. (DR), from October 9, 1821
▌11. George Plumer (DR)
▌12. Thomas Patterson (DR)
▌13. Andrew Stewart (DR)
▌14. Henry Baldwin (DR), until May 8, 1822

▌Walter Forward (DR), from October 8, 1822

▌15. Patrick Farrelly (DR)

==== Rhode Island ====
Both representatives were elected statewide on a general ticket.

▌At-large. Job Durfee (DR)
▌At-large. Samuel Eddy (DR)

==== South Carolina ====
▌1. Joel R. Poinsett (DR)
▌2. William Lowndes (DR), until May 8, 1822

▌James Hamilton Jr. (DR), from December 13, 1822

▌3. Thomas R. Mitchell (DR)
▌4. James Overstreet (DR), until May 24, 1822

▌Andrew R. Govan (DR), from December 4, 1822

▌5. Starling Tucker (DR)
▌6. George McDuffie (DR)
▌7. John Wilson (DR)
▌8. Joseph Gist (DR)
▌9. James Blair (DR), until May 8, 1822

▌John Carter (DR), from December 11, 1822

==== Tennessee ====
▌1. John Rhea (DR)
▌2. John Cocke (DR)
▌3. Francis Jones (DR)
▌4. Robert Allen (DR)
▌5. Newton Cannon (DR)
6. Vacant

==== Vermont ====
▌1. Rollin C. Mallary (DR)
▌2. Phineas White (DR)
▌3. Charles Rich (DR)
▌4. Elias Keyes (DR)
▌5. Samuel C. Crafts (DR)
▌6. John Mattocks (DR)

==== Virginia ====
▌1. Edward B. Jackson (DR)
▌2. Thomas Van Swearingen (F), until August 19, 1822

▌James Stephenson (F), from October 28, 1822

▌3. Jared Williams (DR)
▌4. William McCoy (DR)
▌5. John Floyd (DR)
▌6. Alexander Smyth (DR)
▌7. William Smith (DR)
▌8. Charles F. Mercer (F)
▌9. William Lee Ball (DR)
▌10. Thomas L. Moore (DR)
▌11. Philip P. Barbour (DR)
▌12. Robert S. Garnett (DR)
▌13. Burwell Bassett (DR)
▌14. Jabez Leftwich (DR)
▌15. George Tucker (DR)
▌16. John Randolph (DR)
▌17. William S. Archer (DR)
▌18. Mark Alexander (DR)
▌19. James Jones (DR)
▌20. Arthur Smith (DR)
▌21. Thomas Newton Jr. (DR)
▌22. Hugh Nelson (DR), until January 14, 1823, vacant thereafter
▌23. Andrew Stevenson (DR)

==== Non-voting members ====
Arkansas Territory. James W. Bates
Florida Territory. Joseph M. Hernández, from September 30, 1822
Michigan Territory. Solomon Sibley
Missouri Territory. Vacant until statehood

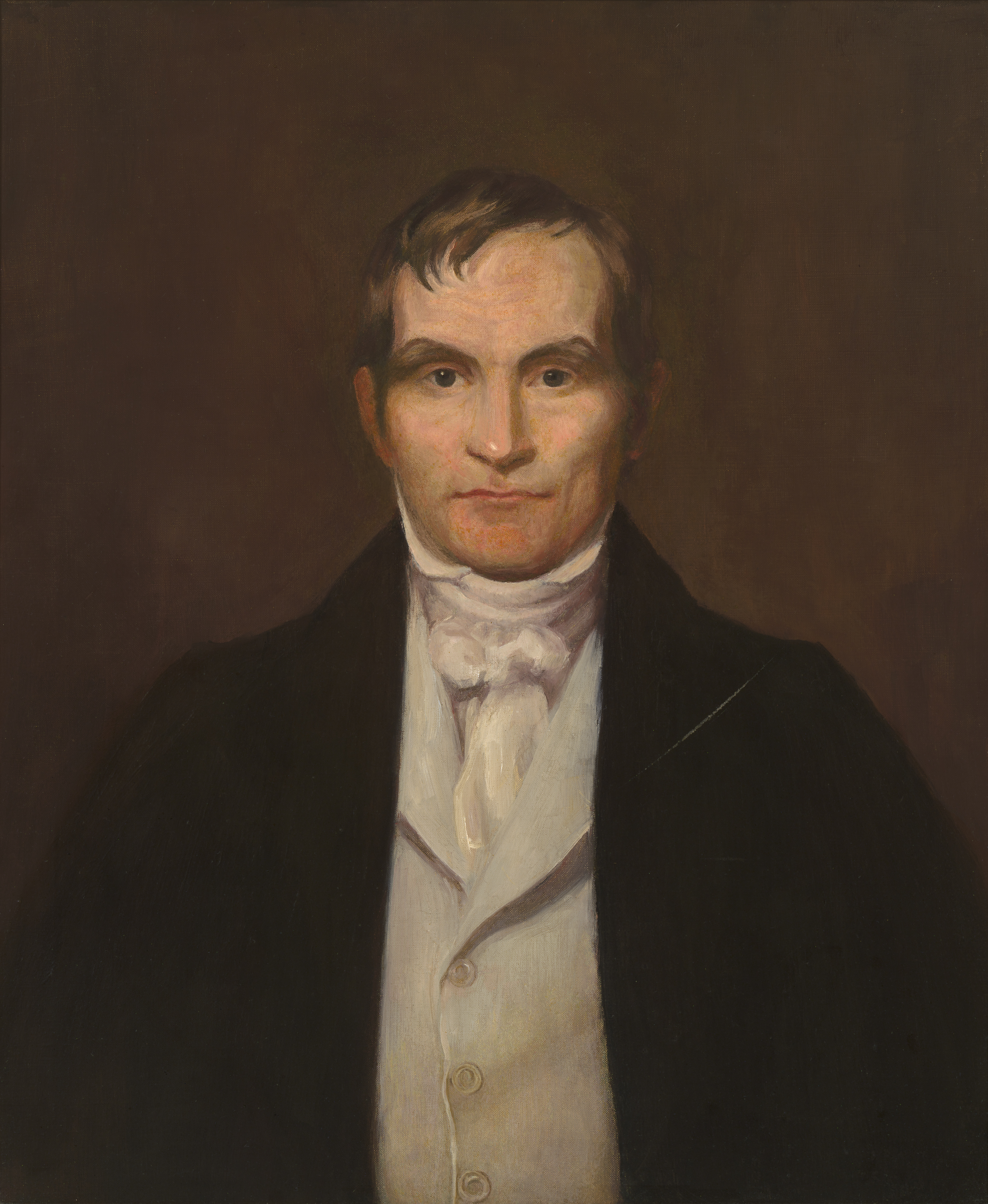
Speaker of the House Philip P. Barbour

== Changes in membership ==
The count below reflects changes from the beginning of the first session of this Congress.

=== Senate ===
- Replacements: 5
  - Democratic-Republicans: no net change
  - Federalists: no net change
- Deaths: 2
- Resignations: 6
- Seats of newly admitted states: 2
- Vacancies: 3
- Total seats with changes: 12

Senate changes
State (class)	Vacated by	Reason for change	Successor	Date of successor's formal installation (Note: When seated or oath administered, not necessarily when service began.)
Tennessee (1)	Vacant	Legislature failed to re-elect John Eaton (DR). Late election held.	John Eaton (DR)	Elected September 27, 1821
Pennsylvania (1)	Vacant	Seat remained vacant at end of previous Congress	William Findlay (DR)	Elected December 10, 1821
Delaware (1)	Vacant	Seat remained vacant at end of previous Congress	Caesar A. Rodney (DR)	Elected January 24, 1822
Georgia (2)	Freeman Walker (DR)	Resigned August 6, 1821	Nicholas Ware (DR)	Elected November 10, 1821
Missouri (1)	New seats	Missouri was admitted to the Union.	Thomas Hart Benton (DR)	Elected August 10, 1821
Missouri (3)	New seats	Missouri was admitted to the Union.	David Barton (DR)	Elected August 10, 1821
Ohio (3)	William A. Trimble (DR)	Died December 13, 1821	Ethan Allen Brown (DR)	Elected January 3, 1822
Maryland (1)	William Pinkney (DR)	Died February 25, 1822	Samuel Smith (DR)	Elected December 17, 1822
Massachusetts (2)	Harrison Gray Otis (F)	Resigned May 30, 1822, to run for Mayor of Boston	James Lloyd (F)	Elected June 5, 1822
Alabama (3)	John W. Walker (DR)	Resigned December 12, 1822, due to failing health	William Kelly (DR)	Elected December 12, 1822
Virginia (2)	James Pleasants (DR)	Resigned December 15, 1822, after being elected Governor of Virginia	John Taylor (DR)	Elected December 18, 1822
Delaware (1)	Caesar A. Rodney (DR)	Resigned January 29, 1823, to accept a diplomatic appointment	Vacant	Not filled in this Congress

=== House of Representatives ===
- Replacements: 13
  - Democratic-Republicans: 1 seat net gain
  - Federalists: 1 seat net loss
- Deaths: 5
- Resignations: 15
- Contested election: 2
- Seats of newly admitted states: 1
- Total seats with changes: 23

House changes
District	Vacated by	Reason for change	Successor	Date of successor's formal installation
Tennessee; 6th	Vacant	Rep. Henry Hunter Bryan was re-elected but did not take his seat	Vacant	
Ohio; 4th	Vacant	Rep.-elect John C. Wright resigned his seat in the next Congress on March 3, 1821	David Chambers (DR)	Seated December 3, 1821
Pennsylvania; 5th	Vacant	Rep.-elect James Duncan resigned before Congress met	John Findlay (DR)	Seated December 12, 1821
Pennsylvania; 10th	Vacant	Rep.-elect William Cox Ellis resigned before Congress met	Thomas Murray Jr. (DR)	Seated December 12, 1821
New York; 1st	Vacant	Credentials for Peter Sharpe were issued by the Secretary of State of New York, but Sharpe never claimed or took the seat, Sharpe's election was contested by Colden, see United States House of Representatives elections in New York, 1821	Cadwallader D. Colden (F)	Seated December 12, 1821
Kentucky; 7th	George Robertson (DR)	resigned before Congress met	John S. Smith (DR)	Seated December 3, 1821
Missouri Territory at-large	Vacant	Missouri was admitted to the Union on August 10, 1821	John Scott (DR)	Seated December 3, 1821
Missouri at-large	Vacant	Missouri was admitted to the Union on August 10, 1821	John Scott (DR)	Seated December 3, 1821
New York; 6th	Vacant	Selah Tuthill (DR) was elected after the Congress term had already begun, and died on September 7, 1821, before Congress met. It is uncertain whether credentials were ever issued for Tuthill.	Charles Borland Jr. (DR)	Seated December 3, 1821
Kentucky; 8th	Wingfield Bullock (DR)	Died October 13, 1821, before Congress met	James D. Breckinridge (DR)	Seated January 2, 1822
New York; 9th	Solomon Van Rensselaer (F)	Resigned January 14, 1822, upon appointment as Postmaster of Albany	Stephen Van Rensselaer (F)	Seated March 12, 1822
Delaware at-large	Caesar A. Rodney (DR)	Resigned on January 24, 1822, after being elected to the US Senate	Daniel Rodney (F)	Seated December 2, 1822
Maryland; 6th	Jeremiah Cosden (DR)	Cosden's election was contested by Reed	Philip Reed (DR)	Seated March 19, 1822
Pennsylvania; 1st	William Milnor (F)	Resigned on May 8, 1822, to run for Mayor of Philadelphia	Thomas Forrest (F)	Seated December 2, 1822
Pennsylvania; 14th	Henry Baldwin (DR)	Resigned on May 8, 1822	Walter Forward (DR)	Seated December 2, 1822
South Carolina; 9th	James Blair (DR)	Resigned on May 8, 1822	John Carter (DR)	Seated December 11, 1822
South Carolina; 2nd	William Lowndes (DR)	Resigned on May 8, 1822	James Hamilton Jr. (DR)	Seated January 6, 1823
Pennsylvania; 6th	Samuel Moore (DR)	Resigned on May 20, 1822	Samuel D. Ingham (DR)	Seated December 2, 1822
South Carolina; 4th	James Overstreet (DR)	Died May 24, 1822	Andrew R. Govan (DR)	Seated December 4, 1822
Maine; 2nd	Ezekiel Whitman (F)	Resigned on June 1, 1822, after becoming a judge of a Court of Common Pleas in Maine	Mark Harris (DR)	Seated December 2, 1822
Indiana at-large	William Hendricks (DR)	Resigned on July 25, 1822, after his election as Governor of Indiana	Jonathan Jennings (DR)	Seated December 2, 1822
Virginia; 2nd	Thomas Van Swearingen (F)	Died on August 19, 1822	James Stephenson (F)	Seated December 2, 1822
Florida Territory at-large	Vacant	Florida Territory was organized on March 30, 1822	Joseph M. Hernández	Seated January 3, 1823
Pennsylvania; 7th	Ludwig Worman (F)	Died October 17, 1822	Daniel Udree (DR)	Seated December 23, 1822
Maryland; 5th	Samuel Smith (DR)	Resigned on December 17, 1822, after his election to the US Senate	Isaac McKim (DR)	Seated January 8, 1823
Virginia; 22nd	Hugh Nelson (DR)	Resigned on January 14, 1823, upon appointment as Minister to Spain	Vacant	

== Committees ==
Lists of committees and their party leaders.

=== Senate ===
- Amendments to the Constitution (Select)
- Audit and Control the Contingent Expenses of the Senate (Chairman: James Lanman then Nathaniel Macon)
- Claims (Chairman: Benjamin Ruggles)
- Commerce and Manufactures (Chairman: Mahlon Dickerson)
- Debt Imprisonment Abolition (Select)
- District of Columbia (Chairman: James Barbour)
- Engrossed Bills (Chairman: James Lanman)
- Finance (Chairman: John Holmes then Walter Lowrie)
- Foreign Relations (Chairman: Rufus King then James Barbour)
- Indian Affairs (Chairman: Henry Johnson)
- Judiciary (Chairman: William Smith)
- Military Affairs (Chairman: John Williams)
- Militia (Chairman: James Noble)
- National Road from Cumberland to Wheeling (Select)
- Naval Affairs (Chairman: James Pleasants)
- Pensions (Chairman: James Noble)
- Post Office and Post Roads (Chairman: Montfort Stokes)
- Public Lands (Chairman: Jesse B. Thomas)
- Roads and Canals (Select)
- Tariff Regulation (Select)
- Whole

=== House of Representatives ===
- Accountability of Public Moneys (Select)
- Accounts (Chairman: Samuel C. Allen)
- Agriculture (Chairman: Josiah Butler)
- Arkansas Territorial Limits (Select)
- Claims (Chairman: Lewis Williams)
- Commerce (Chairman: Thomas Newton Jr.)
- District of Columbia (Chairman: Joseph Kent)
- Elections (Chairman: John Sloane)
- Expenditures in the Navy Department (Chairman: Samuel Edwards)
- Expenditures in the Post Office Department (Chairman: George Denison)
- Expenditures in the State Department (Chairman: Silas Wood)
- Expenditures in the Treasury Department (Chairman: Albert H. Tracy)
- Expenditures in the War Department (Chairman: Starling Tucker)
- Expenditures on Public Buildings (Chairman: Hugh Nelson)
- Foreign Affairs (Chairman: Jonathan Russell)
- Indian Affairs (Chairman: Thomas Metcalfe)
- Judiciary (Chairman: John Sergeant then Hugh Nelson)
- Manufactures (Chairman: John Tod)
- Military Affairs (Chairman: William Eustis)
- Naval Affairs (Chairman: Timothy Fuller)
- Pensions and Revolutionary War Claims (Chairman: John Rhea)
- Post Office and Post Roads (Chairman: Francis Johnson)
- Private Land Claims (Chairman: Samuel Campbell)
- Public Expenditures (Chairman: Thomas Montgomery)
- Public Lands (Chairman: Christopher Rankin)
- Revisal and Unfinished Business (Chairman: Thomas R. Ross)
- Rules (Select)
- Standards of Official Conduct
- Ways and Means (Chairman: Samuel Smith)
- Whole

=== Joint committees ===
- Enrolled Bills
- The Library

== Employees ==
=== Legislative branch agency directors ===
- Architect of the Capitol: Charles Bulfinch
- Librarian of Congress: George Watterston

=== Senate ===
- Chaplain: William Ryland (Methodist), until December 9, 1822
  - Charles P. McIlvaine (Episcopalian), elected December 9, 1822
- Secretary: Charles Cutts
- Sergeant at Arms: Mountjoy Bayly

=== House of Representatives ===
- Chaplain: John Nicholson Campbell (Presbyterian), until December 10, 1821
  - Jared Sparks (Unitarian), elected December 10, 1821
  - John Brackenridge (Presbyterian), elected December 5, 1822
- Clerk: Thomas Dougherty (died)
  - Matthew St. Clair Clarke, elected December 3, 1822
- Doorkeeper: Benjamin Birch, elected December 4, 1821
- Sergeant at Arms: Thomas Dunn

== See also ==
- 1820 United States elections (elections leading to this Congress)
  - 1820 United States presidential election
  - 1820–21 United States Senate elections
  - 1820–21 United States House of Representatives elections
- 1822 United States elections (elections during this Congress, leading to the next Congress)
  - 1822–23 United States Senate elections
  - 1822–23 United States House of Representatives elections

== Bibliography ==
- Martis, Kenneth C. (1989). The Historical Atlas of Political Parties in the United States Congress. New York: Macmillan Publishing Company.
- Martis, Kenneth C. (1982). The Historical Atlas of United States Congressional Districts. New York: Macmillan Publishing Company.
