= Orsamus Cook Merrill =

American politician (1775-1865)

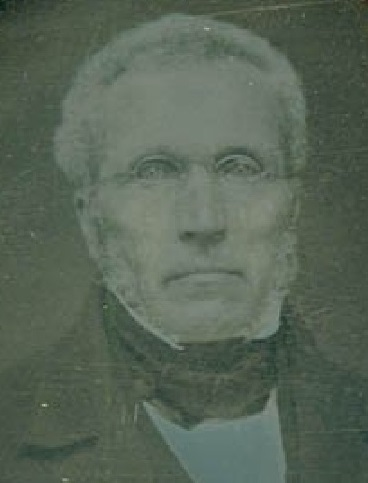

Member of the United States House of Representatives from Vermont's 1st district
- In office March 4, 1817 – January 12, 1820
- Preceded by: Daniel Chipman
- Succeeded by: Rollin Carolas Mallary

Member of the Vermont House of Representatives
- In office 1822–1823; 1841–1847

Personal details
- Born: June 18, 1775 Farmington, Connecticut Colony, British America
- Died: April 12, 1865 (aged 89) Bennington, Vermont, U.S.
- Party: Democratic-Republican Party
- Profession: Politician, Lawyer, Judge

Orsamus Cook Merrill (June 18, 1775 – April 12, 1865) was a U.S. Representative from Vermont.

== Early life ==
Merrill was born in Farmington in the Connecticut Colony to James and Jerusha Seymour Merrill. He completed his preparatory studies in Farmington, and moved to Bennington, Vermont in 1791 where he was an apprentice to a printer. He was an editor or publisher of several newspapers, including the "Vermont Gazette" and the "Tablet of the Times" in Bennington, and the "Berkshire Gazette" in Pittsfield, Massachusetts.

He later studied law, was admitted to the bar in 1805, and practiced in Bennington.

From 1809 to 1812 he was Postmaster of Bennington.

In the early 1800s he also served as Engrossing Clerk of the Vermont House of Representatives.

== War of 1812 ==
He served in upstate New York and Vermont during the War of 1812 as a Major of the 11th Infantry Regiment, and a Lieutenant Colonel in the 26th Infantry and 11th Infantry.

When Merrill received promotion to lieutenant colonel in the 26th Infantry, his replacement as major in the 11th was Zachary Taylor, who was promoted from captain in the 7th Infantry.

== Post-war life ==
Merrill became Register of Probate for Bennington County in 1815 and served as Clerk of the Courts in 1816.

Merrill was elected as a Democratic-Republican candidate to the Fifteenth Congress, serving from March 4, 1817 until March 3, 1819. He presented credentials as a Member-elect to the Sixteenth Congress and served from March 4, 1819 until January 12, 1820, when he was succeeded by Rollin C. Mallary, who successfully contested the election.

== Later life ==
Merrill lost elections for Congress in 1822, 1826, 1827, 1830, 1832, and 1833, evidence that Vermont was trending away from Democrats and towards, in succession, the Anti-Masons, Whigs and Republicans.

In 1822 Merrill served as a delegate to the State constitutional convention.

He served in the Vermont House of Representatives from 1822 to 1823 and from 1841 to 1847 he was county Judge of Probate.

He was Bennington County's State's Attorney from 1823 to 1825, a member of the Governor's Council from 1824 until 1827, and a member of the first Vermont State Senate after the body was created in 1836.

In 1839 he ran unsuccessfully for lieutenant governor.

== Family ==
Merrill married Mary Robinson on August 18, 1805 and they had three children. Mary Robinson was the daughter of Jonathan Robinson.

O.C. Merrill's brother Timothy served as Vermont Secretary of State from 1831 to 1836. His nephew Ferrand F. Merrill (son of Timothy) served as Secretary of State from 1849 to 1853.

== Death ==
Merrill died in Bennington on April 12, 1865.

Party political offices
Preceded by John S. Pettibone	Democratic nominee for Lieutenant Governor of Vermont; 1839	Succeeded by Edward D. Barber
U.S. House of Representatives
Preceded by Daniel Chipman	Member of the U.S. House of Representatives from Vermont's at-large congressional district 1817-1820	Succeeded by Rollin C. Mallary
