= Benjamin F. Deming =

American politician (1790–1834)

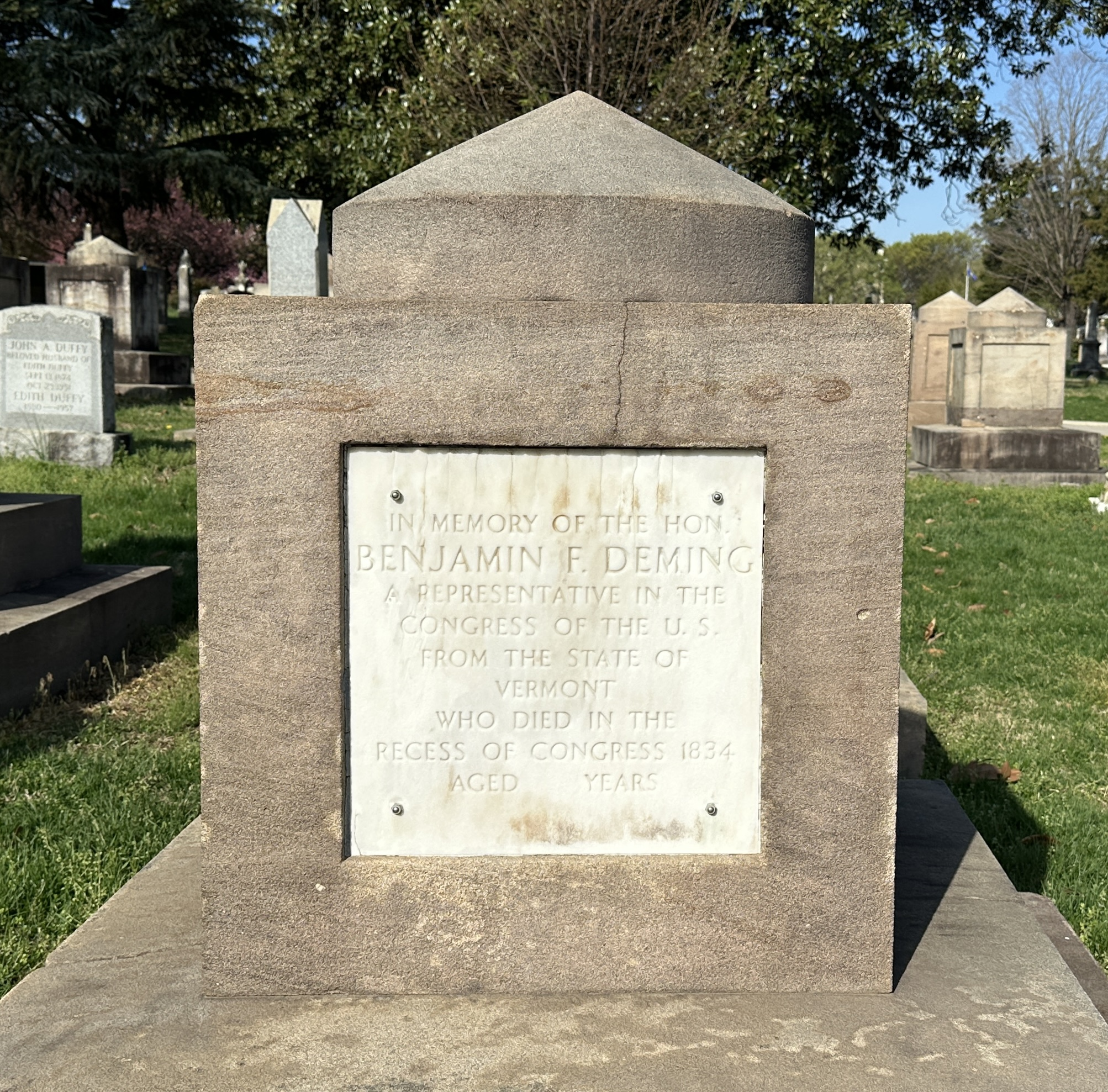
- Deming's cenotaph at Congressional Cemetery

Member of the United States House of Representatives from Vermont's 5th district
- In office March 4, 1833 – July 11, 1834
- Preceded by: William Cahoon
- Succeeded by: Henry Fisk Janes

Personal details
- Born: August 12, 1790 Danville, Vermont Republic
- Died: July 11, 1834 (aged 43) Saratoga Springs, New York, U.S.
- Resting place: Danville Green Cemetery
- Party: Anti-Masonic
- Spouse: Eunice Clark Deming
- Children: 5
- Relatives: Carlos Baxter (son-in-law)
- Profession: Politician, Merchant

Benjamin F. Deming (August 12, 1790 – July 11, 1834) was an American merchant and politician. He served briefly as a U.S. representative from Vermont for part of one term from 1833 to 1834.

== Biography ==
Deming was born in 1790 in Danville in the Vermont Republic; he pursued academic studies and became a merchant.

=== Early career ===
He was the clerk of the Caledonia County Court from 1817 until 1833. From 1822 until 1833, he was the probate judge in Vermont, and he served as a member of the Governor's council from 1827 until 1832.

=== Congress ===
Deming was elected as an Anti-Masonic candidate to the Twenty-third Congress, and served from March 4, 1833 until his death on July 11, 1834.

== Personal life ==
He married Eunice Clark on June 6, 1816. They had five children together.

== Death ==
In the summer of 1834, Deming became ill while in Washington, DC and decided to return home. He died in Saratoga Springs, New York en route to his home in Danville. He is interred at the Danville Green Cemetery.

== See also ==
- List of members of the United States Congress who died in office (1790–1899)

U.S. House of Representatives
Preceded by William Cahoon	Member of the U.S. House of Representatives from Vermont's 5th congressional district 1833–1834	Succeeded by Henry F. Janes
