= Henry Fisk Janes =

American politician

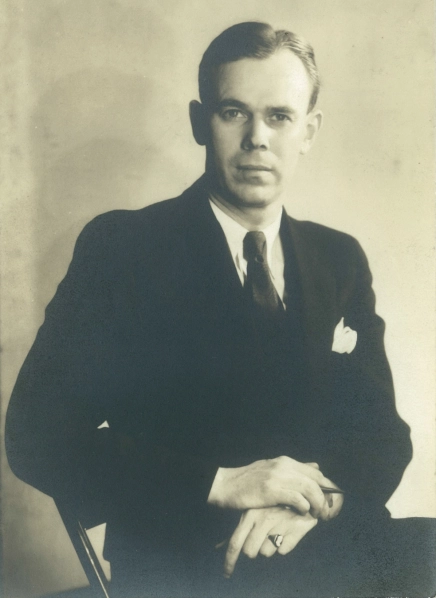

Member of the United States House of Representatives from Vermont's 5th district
- In office December 2, 1834 – March 3, 1837
- Preceded by: Benjamin F. Deming
- Succeeded by: Isaac Fletcher

Vermont State Treasurer
- In office October, 1838 – October 1841
- Preceded by: Allen Wardner
- Succeeded by: John Spaulding

Member of the Vermont House of Representatives
- In office 1854–1855; 1861–1862

Personal details
- Born: October 10, 1792 Brimfield, Massachusetts, U.S.
- Died: June 6, 1879 (aged 86) Waterbury, Vermont, U.S.
- Party: Anti-Masonic; Whig; Republican
- Spouse: Fanny Butler Janes in 1827
- Children: 2
- Profession: Politician, Lawyer

Henry Fisk Janes (October 10, 1792 – June 6, 1879) was an American lawyer and politician. He served as a U.S. representative from Vermont from 1834 to 1837.

== Biography ==
Janes was born in Brimfield, Massachusetts and moved with his parents to Calais, Vermont where he pursued academic studies.

=== War of 1812 ===
He served in the War of 1812 as an officer in Captain Gideon Wheelock's company of Vermont Militia, and participated in the Battle of Plattsburgh.

=== Political career ===
He studied law in Montpelier and was admitted to the bar. He began the practice of law in Waterbury. He was Postmaster from 1820 until 1830. He served as a member of the Governor's Council from 1830 until 1834.

Janes was elected as an Anti-Masonic candidate to the Twenty-third Congress to fill the vacancy caused by the death of Benjamin F. Deming and was reelected to the Twenty-fourth Congress, serving from December 2, 1834, until March 3, 1837. He was an unsuccessful Anti-Masonic candidate for reelection in 1836.

He was the Vermont State Treasurer from 1838 until 1841 as a Whig, and served as a member of the state council of censors in 1848. Janes joined the Republican Party at its creation in the mid-1850s, and was a member of the Vermont House of Representatives in 1854, 1855, 1861, and 1862.

== Personal life ==
In 1827 Janes married Fanny Butler, the daughter of Governor Ezra Butler. Their daughter Helen Maria was born in 1828, and their son Henry Janes was born in 1832 and died in 1915. Henry Janes was a physician during the American Civil War, and attained the rank of brigadier general as surgeon general of the Vermont National Guard.

== Death ==
Janes died on June 6, 1879, in Waterbury, Vermont, and is interred at Hope Cemetery in Waterbury.

Party political offices
First	Whig nominee for Vermont State Treasurer; 1838, 1839, 1840	Succeeded by John Spaulding
U.S. House of Representatives
Preceded by Benjamin F. Deming	Member of the U.S. House of Representatives from Vermont's 5th congressional district 1834–1837	Succeeded by Isaac Fletcher
Political offices
Preceded by Allen Wardner	Vermont State Treasurer; 1838–1841	Succeeded by John Spaulding
