= Phineas White =

American politician

Member of the U.S. House of Representatives from Vermont's 2nd congressional district
- In office March 4, 1821 – March 3, 1823
- Preceded by: Mark Richards
- Succeeded by: William Czar Bradley

Member of the Vermont House of Representatives
- In office 1815–1820

Personal details
- Born: October 30, 1770 South Hadley, Province of Massachusetts Bay, British America
- Died: July 6, 1847 (aged 76) Putney, Vermont, U.S.
- Resting place: Maple Grove Cemetery, Putney, Vermont, U.S.
- Party: Democratic-Republican
- Profession: Attorney

Phineas White (October 30, 1770 – July 6, 1847) was an American lawyer and politician. He served one term as United States Representative from Vermont from 1821 to 1823.

== Biography ==
White was born in South Hadley in the Province of Massachusetts Bay to Deacon Enoch White and Esther Stevens. He graduated from Dartmouth College in Hanover, New Hampshire in 1797.

=== Legal career ===
He studied law with Charles Marsh of Woodstock, Vermont and Judge Samuel Porter of Dummerston, Vermont. He was admitted to the bar in 1800 and commenced practice in Pomfret. White married Elizabeth Stevens on July 5, 1801.

He was Register of Probate for Windsor County from 1800 to 1809, postmaster of Putney from 1802 to 1809 and county attorney in 1813.

White served as judge of Windham County in 1814, 1815 and 1817, and was chief judge from 1818 to 1820. White was probate judge of the Westminster district from 1814 to 1815.

White was a member of the state constitutional convention in 1814 and served in the Vermont House of Representatives from 1815 to 1820.

=== Congress ===
He was elected as a Democratic-Republican to the Seventeenth Congress, and served from March 4, 1821 to March 3, 1823. White was again a member of the state constitutional convention in 1836 and also served in the Vermont Senate in 1836 and 1837.

=== Affiliations ===
White served as a trustee of Middlebury College, President of the Vermont Bible Society, and President of the Vermont Colonization Society. He belonged to the Masonic Order and was Grand Master of the Grand Lodge of Vermont.

== Death ==
White died on July 6, 1847, in Putney, Vermont and was buried in Maple Grove Cemetery.

U.S. House of Representatives
| Preceded by William Strong | Member of the U.S. House of Representatives from Vermont's 2nd congressional district 1821–1823 | Succeeded by William C. Bradley |
