= Rollin Carolas Mallary =

American politician (1784-1831)

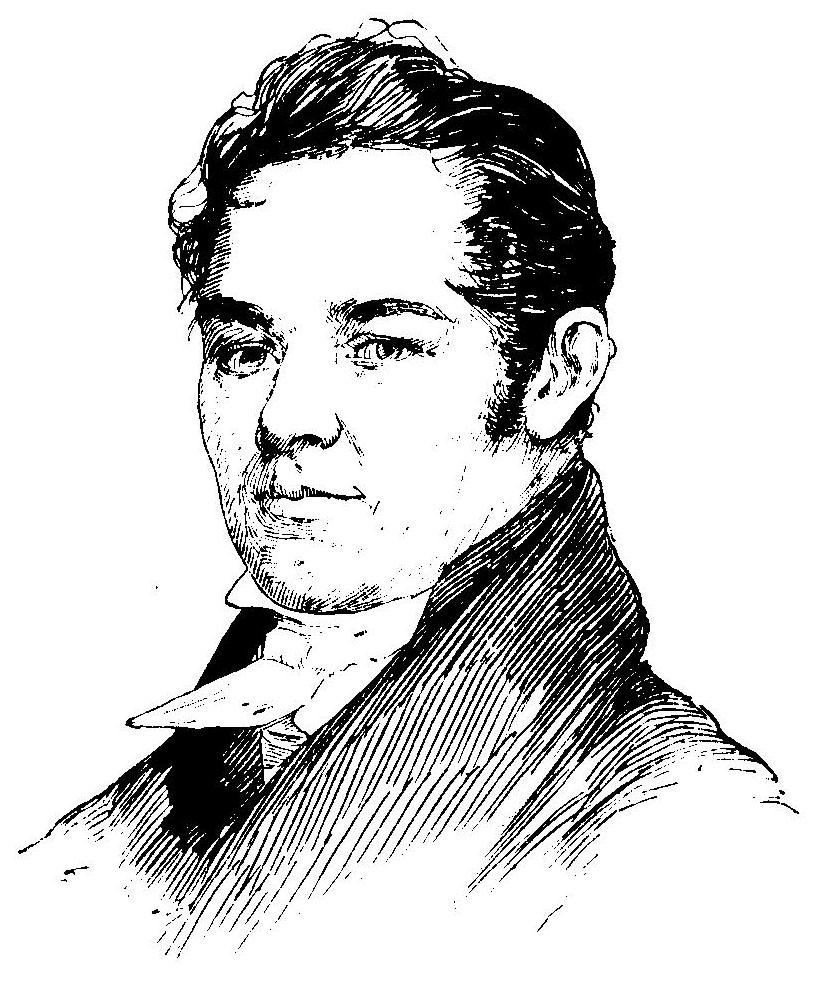

Member of the U.S. House of Representatives from Vermont
- In office January 13, 1820 – April 15, 1831
- Preceded by: Orsamus C. Merrill (AL); District established (1st); William C. Bradley (2nd)
- Succeeded by: District eliminated (AL); William C. Bradley (1st); William Slade (2nd)
- Constituency: At-large district (1820-21); 1st district (1821-25); 2nd district (1825-31)

Personal details
- Born: May 27, 1784 Cheshire, Connecticut
- Died: April 15, 1831 (aged 46) Baltimore, Maryland
- Party: Democratic-Republican Party
- Spouse: Ruth Stanley Mallary
- Children: Carolus Rollin, Caroline Stanley, George Henry, and Sarah Mallary

Rollin Carolas Mallary (May 27, 1784 – April 15, 1831) was an American lawyer and politician. He served as U.S. Representative from Vermont.

== Biography ==
Mallary was born in Cheshire, Connecticut, and graduated from Middlebury College in 1805. He moved to Poultney, Vermont, where he studied law and was admitted to the bar. He began the practice of law in Castleton, Vermont, in 1807. Mallary married Ruth Stanley Mallary, and they had four children.

Mallary was elected trustee of the Rutland County Grammar School in 1807. He was appointed by Governor Israel Smith as Secretary to the Governor and Council in 1807, he held that position again from 1809 to 1812 and from 1815 to 1819. He served as the State's attorney for Rutland County from 1811 to 1813. In 1816, Mallary moved to Poultney, Vermont. He was defeated for Congress in 1819 because votes for several of the towns were not returned early enough to be counted. As a Democratic-Republican, Mallary successfully contested the election of Orsamus C. Merrill to the Sixteenth Congress.

Mallary served six terms in Congress. He was elected as a Democratic-Republican to the Seventeenth Congress, reelected as an Adams-Clay Democratic-Republican to the Eighteenth Congress, and elected as an Adams candidate to the Nineteenth and Twentieth Congresses. He was reelected as an Anti-Jacksonian candidate to the Twenty-first and Twenty-second Congresses, serving from January 13, 1820, until his death in Baltimore, Maryland, on April 15, 1831. He served as chairman of the Committee on Manufactures in the Nineteenth through Twenty-first Congresses.

== Death ==
Mallary is interred in East Poultney Cemetery, in East Poultney, Vermont.

== See also ==
- List of members of the United States Congress who died in office (1790–1899)

U.S. House of Representatives
| Preceded by Orsamus C. Merrill | Member of the U.S. House of Representatives from Vermont's 2nd congressional district 1820-1821 | Succeeded by District eliminated |
| Preceded by Samuel Shaw | Member of the U.S. House of Representatives from Vermont's 1st congressional district 1821-1825 | Succeeded by William C. Bradley |
| Preceded by William C. Bradley | Member of the U.S. House of Representatives from Vermont's 2nd congressional district 1825-1831 | Succeeded by William Slade |
