= Lewis R. Morris =

American politician

Lewis Richard Morris
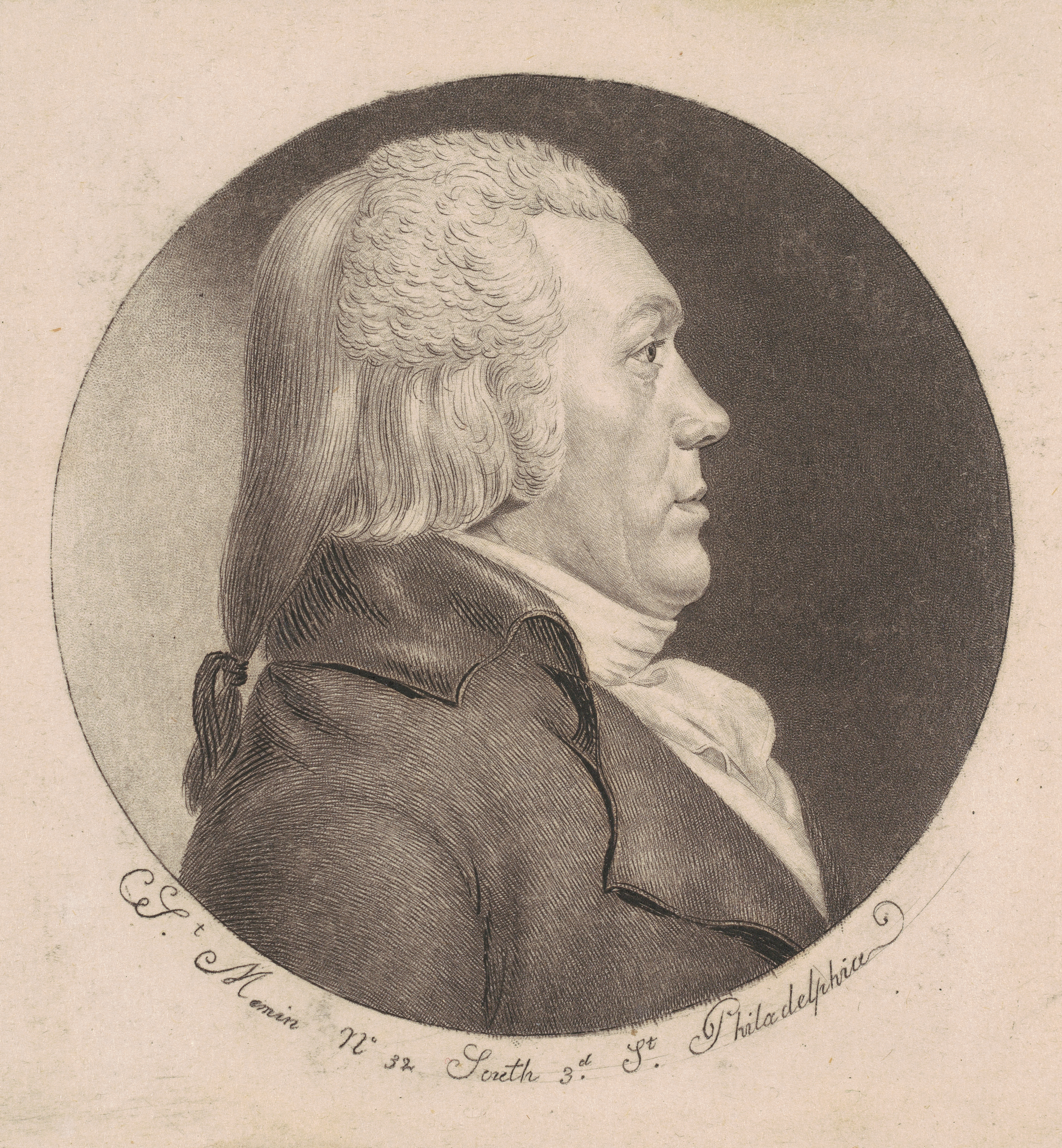
- Morris in 1798

Member of the U.S. House of Representatives from Vermont's 2nd district
- In office May 22, 1797 – March 3, 1803
- Preceded by: Daniel Buck
- Succeeded by: James Elliot

Member of the Vermont House of Representatives
- In office 1795–1797; 1803–1808

Personal details
- Born: November 2, 1760 Scarsdale, Province of New York, British America
- Died: December 29, 1825 (aged 65) Springfield, Vermont, U.S.
- Party: Federalist
- Spouse(s): Hulda Theodosia Olcott; Ellen Hunt
- Parent(s): Richard Morris; Sarah Ludlow

Lewis Richard Morris (November 2, 1760 – December 29, 1825) was an American lawyer and politician. He served as a United States representative from Vermont.

== Early life ==
Morris was born in Scarsdale in the Province of New York to Sarah Ludlow (1730–1791) and Richard Morris (1730–1810), Chief Justice of the New York Supreme Court from 1779 to 1790. Morris attended the common schools. While in his teens, Morris served as an aide to General Philip Schuyler and then to General George Clinton (vice president) during the American Revolutionary War. Morris was a nephew of Gouverneur Morris and Lewis Morris.

== Career ==
In 1786, Morris moved to Springfield in the Vermont Republic and established himself as a businessman, landowner and politician. He served as Secretary of Foreign Affairs from 1781 to 1783. He was a member of the Springfield meeting-house committee in 1785 and was tax collector in 1786 and 1787. He served as a selectman on the town council in 1788, and as town treasurer from 1790 to 1794. Morris was Windsor County court clerk from 1789 to 1796. He served as judge of the Windsor County court until 1801.

Morris was clerk of the Vermont House of Representatives in 1790 and 1791, and was a member of the convention to ratify the United States Constitution. He was secretary of the constitutional convention in Windsor in 1793. Morris attended the Vermont ratifying convention in Bennington, Vermont, where he voted in support of the Constitution. On March 4, 1791, President George Washington appointed him the first U.S. Marshal of the District of Vermont. He served as Marshal until 1794 and was succeeded by his deputy, Jabez G. Fitch.

Morris was a brigadier general in the State militia in 1793 and major general of the First Division from 1795 to 1817. He was a member of the Vermont House of Representatives from 1795 to 1797 and 1803 to 1808, and served as speaker. He was elected as a Federalist to the Fifth, Sixth, and Seventh Congresses, holding office from May 22, 1797, to March 3, 1803.

== Personal life ==
Morris married Mary Dwight, daughter of Timothy and Mary Edwards Dwight, Hulda Theodosia Olcott, who died soon after their marriage and Ellen Hunt, daughter of Jonathan Hunt Sr.

Morris died on December 29, 1825, in Springfield, Vermont, and is interred at Forest Hill Cemetery in Charlestown, New Hampshire.

U.S. House of Representatives
Preceded by Daniel Buck	Member of the U.S. House of Representatives from Vermont's 2nd congressional district May 22, 1797 – March 3, 1803	Succeeded by James Elliot
