= Nathaniel Niles (politician) =

American lawyer and politician (1741–1828)

Member of the U.S. House of Representatives from Vermont's 2nd district
- In office October 17, 1791 – March 3, 1795
- Preceded by: None (position created)
- Succeeded by: Daniel Buck

Personal details
- Born: April 3, 1741 South Kingstown, Rhode Island Colony, British America
- Died: October 31, 1828 (aged 87) Fairlee, Vermont, U.S.
- Party: Anti-Administration Party
- Spouse: Elizabeth Watson Niles
- Profession: Attorney; Entrepreneur

Nathaniel Niles (April 3, 1741 – October 31, 1828) was an American lawyer and politician. He served as a United States representative from Vermont. He also wrote a famous poem about the Battle of Bunker Hill. Orated one of the first abolition sermons preached in the colonies.

== Early life ==
Niles was born in South Kingstown in the Colony of Rhode Island and Providence Plantations. He attended Harvard College and graduated from Princeton College in 1766. He studied law and medicine, and taught in New York City. Niles also studied theology and preached in Norwich and Torrington, Connecticut. Niles invented a process for making wire, and erected mills in Norwich.

On the fifth of June, 1774, he gave two sermons in the North church in Newburyport. He argued liberal concepts of liberty must apply to all, including those enslaved. Proclaiming "For shame, let us either cease to enslave our fellow-men, or else let us cease to complain of those who would enslave us."

== Career ==
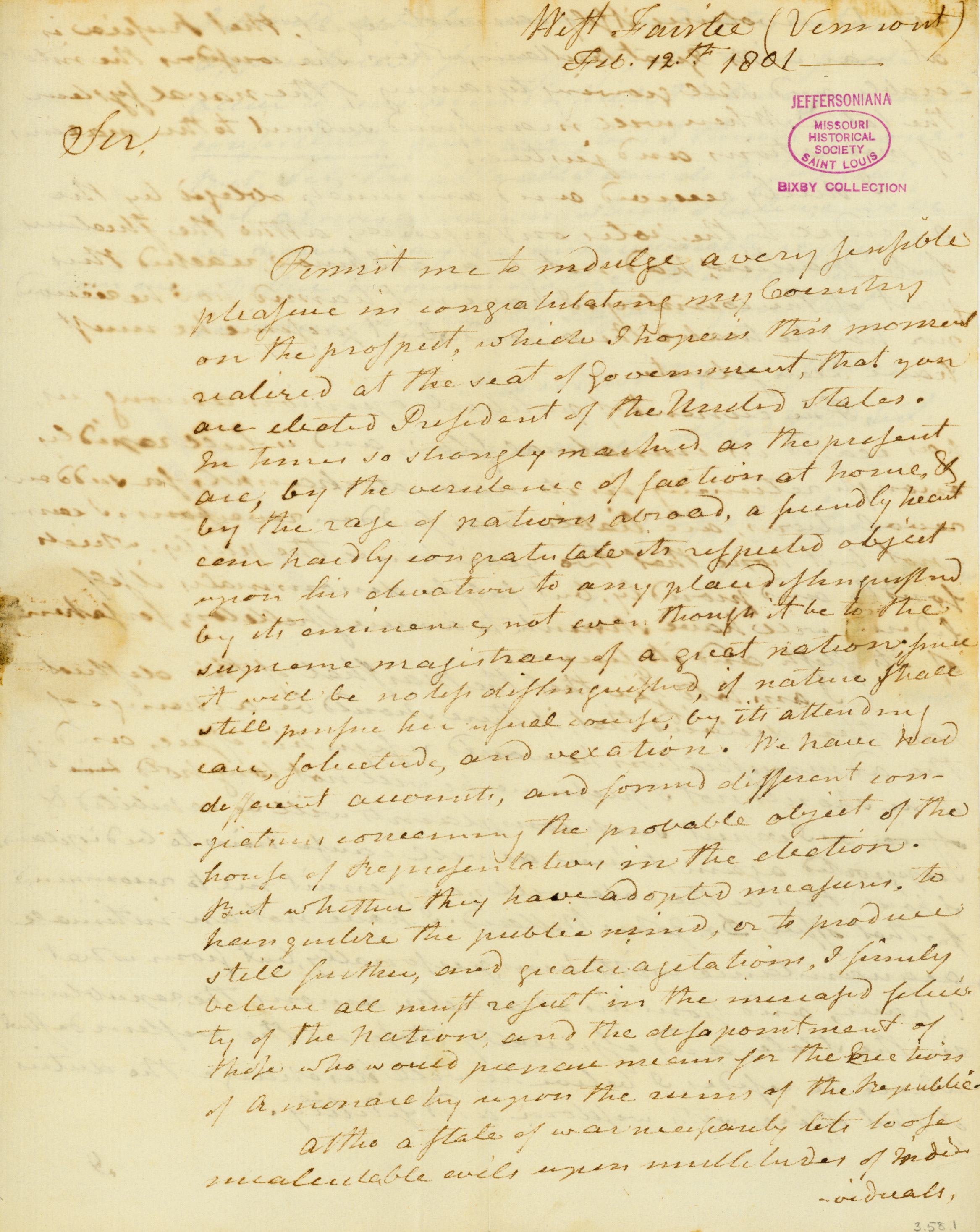
Letter from Niles to Thomas Jefferson, February 12, 1801

After the Revolution, Niles moved to West Fairlee in the Vermont Republic, and was a member of the Vermont House of Representatives in 1784 and served as Speaker. From 1784 to 1788, he was a justice of the Vermont Supreme Court and a member of the council in 1785 and 1787.

He was a delegate to the Vermont state constitutional convention of 1791, and upon the admission of Vermont as a State into the Union was elected to the Second Congress as an Anti-Administration Party candidate. Niles was reelected to the Third Congress and served from October 17, 1791, to March 3, 1795. He was one of seven representatives to vote against the Fugitive Slave Act of 1793.

After his terms in Congress, Niles was again a member of the Vermont House of Representatives from 1800 to 1803 and 1812 to 1815. He was a member of the Governor's Council from 1803 to 1809. He was a presidential elector for the Thomas Jefferson ticket in 1804 and for the James Madison ticket in 1812. He was a delegate to the State constitutional convention of 1814.

== The American Hero ==
During his early adulthood, Niles was famous for a poem he wrote in 1775 and published in a broadside in 1781. The music for the poem was published the same year by Andrew Law, entitled Bunker Hill; the poem and song were widely printed and sung well into the 1830s.

== Death ==
Niles died in Fairlee, Vermont on October 31, 1828, and was interred at West Fairlee Center Cemetery.

== Family ==
In 1774, Niles married Nancy Lathrop. After her death, in 1789 Niles married Elizabeth Watson, whose family was from Plymouth, Massachusetts.

With his first wife, Niles' children included William, Sally, Mary, and Elizabeth. With his second wife, Niles was the father of five children -- Nathaniel, Samuel, Betsey, Watson, and Nancy.

== See also ==
- Colonial government in the Thirteen Colonies

U.S. House of Representatives
Preceded by None (position created)	Member of the U.S. House of Representatives from Vermont's 2nd congressional district 1791–1795	Succeeded by Daniel Buck
