= Vermont's 3rd congressional district =

Electoral district 1803-1883

- Obsolete district
- Created: 1803; 1821; 1825
- Eliminated: 1810; 1820; 1880
- Years active: 1803–1813; 1821–1823; 1825–1883

Vermont's 3rd congressional district is an obsolete district. It was created in 1803. It was eliminated after the 1880 census. Its last congressman was William W. Grout.

== List of members representing the district ==
Member	Party	Years ↑	Cong ress	Electoral history	Location
District established March 4, 1803
William Chamberlain (Peacham)	Federalist	March 4, 1803 – March 3, 1805	8th	Elected in 1802. Lost re-election.	1803–1813 [data missing]
James Fisk (Barre)	Democratic-Republican	March 4, 1805 – March 3, 1809	9th 10th	Elected on the third ballot in 1805. Re-elected in 1806. Lost re-election.	1803–1813 [data missing]
William Chamberlain (Peacham)	Federalist	March 4, 1809 – March 3, 1811	11th	Elected in 1808. Lost re-election.	1803–1813 [data missing]
James Fisk (Barre)	Democratic-Republican	March 4, 1811 – March 3, 1813	12th	Elected in 1810. Redistricted to the at-large district.	1803–1813 [data missing]
District inactive		March 4, 1813 – March 3, 1821	13th 14th 15th 16th	Vermont elected its representatives statewide at-large.	
Charles Rich (Shoreham)	Democratic-Republican	March 4, 1821 – March 3, 1823	17th	Redistricted from the at-large district and re-elected on the third ballot in 1821. Redistricted to the at-large district.	1821–1823 [data missing]
District inactive		March 4, 1823 – March 3, 1825	18th	Vermont elected its representatives statewide at-large.	
George Edward Wales (Hartford)	Anti-Jacksonian	March 4, 1825 – March 3, 1829	19th 20th	Elected in 1824. Re-elected in 1826. Lost re-election.	1825–1833 [data missing]
Horace Everett (Windsor)	Anti-Jacksonian	March 4, 1829 – March 3, 1837	21st 22nd 23rd 24th 25th 26th 27th	Elected in 1828 on the second ballot. Re-elected in 1830. Re-elected in 1833. Re-elected in 1834. Re-elected in 1836. Re-elected in 1838. Re-elected in 1840. Retired to run for U.S. Senator.	1825–1833 [data missing]
Horace Everett (Windsor)	Anti-Jacksonian	March 4, 1829 – March 3, 1837	21st 22nd 23rd 24th 25th 26th 27th	Elected in 1828 on the second ballot. Re-elected in 1830. Re-elected in 1833. Re-elected in 1834. Re-elected in 1836. Re-elected in 1838. Re-elected in 1840. Retired to run for U.S. Senator.	1833–1843 [data missing]
Horace Everett (Windsor)	Whig	March 4, 1837 – March 3, 1843	21st 22nd 23rd 24th 25th 26th 27th	Elected in 1828 on the second ballot. Re-elected in 1830. Re-elected in 1833. Re-elected in 1834. Re-elected in 1836. Re-elected in 1838. Re-elected in 1840. Retired to run for U.S. Senator.	1833–1843 [data missing]
George Perkins Marsh (Burlington)	Whig	March 3, 1843 – May 29, 1849	28th 29th 30th	Elected in 1843. Re-elected in 1844. Re-elected in 1846. Re-elected in 1848. Resigned to become U.S. Minister resident to Turkey.	1843–1853; Franklin County, Grand Isle County, Chittenden County, Addison County
Vacant		May 29, 1849 – December 3, 1849	30th		1843–1853; Franklin County, Grand Isle County, Chittenden County, Addison County
James Meacham (Middlebury)	Whig	December 3, 1849 – March 3, 1853	30th 31st 32nd	Elected to finish Marsh's term. Re-elected in 1850. Redistricted to the 1st district.	1843–1853; Franklin County, Grand Isle County, Chittenden County, Addison County
Alvah Sabin (Georgia)	Whig	March 4, 1853 – March 3, 1855	33rd 34th	Elected in 1852. Re-elected in 1854. Retired.	1853–1863; Franklin County, Orleans County, Lamoille County, Essex County, Grand Isle County, Chittenden County
Alvah Sabin (Georgia)	Opposition	March 4, 1855 – March 3, 1857	33rd 34th	Elected in 1852. Re-elected in 1854. Retired.	1853–1863; Franklin County, Orleans County, Lamoille County, Essex County, Grand Isle County, Chittenden County
Homer E. Royce (East Berkshire)	Republican	March 4, 1857 – March 3, 1861	35th 36th	Elected in 1856. Elected in 1858. Retired.	1853–1863; Franklin County, Orleans County, Lamoille County, Essex County, Grand Isle County, Chittenden County
Portus Baxter (Derby Line)	Republican	March 4, 1861 – March 3, 1867	37th 38th 39th	Elected in 1860. Re-elected in 1863. Re-elected in 1864. Retired.	1853–1863; Franklin County, Orleans County, Lamoille County, Essex County, Grand Isle County, Chittenden County
Portus Baxter (Derby Line)	Republican	March 4, 1861 – March 3, 1867	37th 38th 39th	Elected in 1860. Re-elected in 1863. Re-elected in 1864. Retired.	1863–1873 [data missing]
Worthington C. Smith (St. Albans)	Republican	March 4, 1867 – March 3, 1873	40th 41st 42nd	Elected in 1866. Re-elected in 1868. Re-elected in 1870. Retired.	1863–1873 [data missing]
George W. Hendee (Morrisville)	Republican	March 4, 1873 – March 3, 1879	43rd 44th 45th	Elected in 1872. Re-elected in 1874. Re-elected in 1876. Lost re-election.	1873–1883; Franklin County, Orleans County, Lamoille County, Essex County, Grand Isle County, Chittenden County
Bradley Barlow (St. Albans)	Greenback	March 4, 1879 – March 3, 1881	46th	Elected in 1878. Lost re-election.	1873–1883; Franklin County, Orleans County, Lamoille County, Essex County, Grand Isle County, Chittenden County
William W. Grout (Barton)	Republican	March 4, 1881 – March 3, 1883	47th	Elected in 1880. Redistricted to the 2nd district and lost renomination.	1873–1883; Franklin County, Orleans County, Lamoille County, Essex County, Grand Isle County, Chittenden County
District dissolved March 3, 1883
