= Daniel Buck =

American politician (1753–1816)

Member of the U.S. House of Representatives from Vermont's 2nd district
- In office March 4, 1795 – March 3, 1797
- Preceded by: Nathaniel Miles
- Succeeded by: Lewis R. Morris

2nd Attorney General of Vermont
- In office 1793–1795
- Governor: Thomas Chittenden
- Preceded by: Samuel Hitchcock
- Succeeded by: office abolished (1797–1904); Clarke C. Fitts (in 1904)

Member of the Vermont House of Representatives
- In office 1784

Personal details
- Born: November 9, 1753 Hebron, Connecticut Colony, British America (now Connecticut, U.S.)
- Died: August 16, 1816 (aged 62) Chelsea, Vermont, U.S.
- Party: Federalist
- Spouse: Content Ashley Buck
- Children: Alpha Buck, Daniel Azro Ashley Buck, Samuel Ashley Buck, Portus Buck, Thomas Osker Noldo Buck

Daniel Buck (November 9, 1753 – August 16, 1816) was an American lawyer and politician. He served as a United States representative from Vermont.

== Biography ==
Buck was born in Hebron, Connecticut, the son of Thomas and Jane Buck.

He served as a soldier in the American Revolution and rose to the rank of sergeant as a member of Captain David Wheeler's Company in the Massachusetts militia regiment commanded by Benjamin Simonds. He was wounded and lost an arm at the Battle of Bennington in 1777, and received a pension from the state of Massachusetts.

He studied law with Sylvester Gilbert and was admitted to the bar in 1783. He practiced law in Thetford, Vermont, and served as state's attorney of Orange County from 1783 to 1785 and Orange County's clerk of the court in 1783 and 1784.

He was assistant secretary of the Vermont House of Representatives in 1784, and secretary pro tempore of Vermont's Governor's Council in 1785.

Buck moved to Norwich, Vermont in 1785. The town's first attorney, he also supported himself by carrying out the duties of town highway surveyor and pound keeper. He was a delegate to the 1791 convention which ratified the United States Constitution and made possible Vermont's admission to the Union as the 14th state. That year, he ran as the Federalist candidate in the 2nd congressional district, which he would later be elected to in 1795. In 1792 he served on the state Council of Censors, which met periodically to review acts of the Vermont House and ensure their constitutionality.

He was a member of the Vermont House of Representatives in 1793 and 1794, and served as Speaker. He served as Vermont Attorney General from 1793 to 1795.

He was elected as a Federalist to the Fourth Congress, serving from March 4, 1795, to March 3, 1797. He was re-elected in 1796 but declined his seat.

In 1799 Buck received the honorary degree of Master of Arts from Dartmouth College.

Buck was state's attorney for Windsor County in 1802 and 1803.

In 1805 Buck moved to Chelsea, Vermont, where he practiced law and again served as a member of the Vermont House of Representatives in 1806 and 1807. Among the students who studied law with Buck was William A. Palmer.

While living in Chelsea Buck was imprisoned for debt. He was given a parole called "freedom of the prison", which enabled him to work and raise money to pay off his creditors.

== Death ==
Buck died in Chelsea on August 16, 1816, and was interred at the Old Chelsea Cemetery in Chelsea.

== Family ==
In 1786 Buck married Content Ashley of Norwich. They were the parents of eleven children, seven of whom lived to adulthood.

Daniel Buck's son, Daniel Azro Ashley Buck, was also a U.S. Representative from Vermont, and served in the Twentieth Congress (March 4, 1827 to March 3, 1829).

Political offices
| Preceded by Gideon Olin | Speaker of the Vermont House of Representatives; 1793–1795 | Succeeded by Lewis R. Morris |
U.S. House of Representatives
| Preceded by Nathaniel Niles | Member of the U.S. House of Representatives from Vermont's 2nd congressional district 1795–1797 | Succeeded by Lewis R. Morris |
