= Elias Keyes =

American politician

Member of the United States House of Representatives from Vermont's 4th district
- In office March 4, 1821 – March 3, 1823
- Preceded by: William Strong
- Succeeded by: Daniel Azro Ashley Buck

Member of the Vermont House of Representatives
- In office 1793–1796; 1798–1802; 1818; 1820; 1823–1825

Personal details
- Born: April 14, 1758 Ashford, Connecticut Colony, British America
- Died: July 9, 1844 (aged 86) Stockbridge, Vermont, U.S.
- Resting place: Stockbridge's Maplewood Cemetery
- Party: Democratic-Republican
- Profession: Politician, Judge

Elias Keyes (April 14, 1758 – July 9, 1844) was an American politician and judge. He served one term as a U.S. representative from Vermont from 1821 to 1823.

== Biography ==
Keyes was born in Ashford in the Connecticut Colony. He attended the common schools and later read law.

=== Revolutionary War ===
Keyes enlisted in the Continental Army during the American Revolution, and rose to the rank of sergeant major.

In 1780 he moved to Barnard, Vermont. In 1785, he accepted an offer of 400 acres for whoever constructed the first gristmill and sawmill in Stockbridge, Vermont, and he was one of the town's first settlers.

=== Political career ===
Keyes served in the Vermont House of Representatives from 1793 until 1796, 1798 until 1802, 1818, 1820 and 1823 until 1825.

He was a member of the Governor's council from 1805 until 1813 and from 1815 until 1817. In 1814 Keyes was a member of the Vermont state constitutional convention. From 1803 until 1814 he served as assistant judge of the Windsor County, Vermont Court, and from 1815 until 1818 he served as judge of Windsor County.

Keyes was elected a Democratic-Republican to the Seventeenth United States Congress, serving from March 4, 1821 until March 3, 1823.

=== Later career ===
Business reverses and debts after his term in Congress caused Keyes to move to Norfolk, New York. He later returned to Stockbridge and was able to restart his gristmill and sawmill.

=== Death and burial ===
He died in Stockbridge on July 9, 1844, and was interred in Stockbridge's Maplewood Cemetery.

U.S. House of Representatives
Preceded by District created	Member of the U.S. House of Representatives from Vermont's 4th congressional district March 4, 1821–March 3, 1823	Succeeded by Daniel Azro A. Buck
