= 1824 Vermont's at-large congressional district special election =

On October 15, 1824, Charles Rich of Vermont's at-large district died in office. A special election was held for his replacement.

== Election results ==
Candidate	Party	Votes	Percent
Henry Olin	Democratic-Republican	5,197	59.3%
Charles K. Williams		3,420	39.0%

Olin took his seat in the 18th Congress on December 13, 1824.

== See also ==
- List of special elections to the United States House of Representatives
