= Vermont's 5th congressional district =

- Obsolete district
- Created: 1821
- Eliminated: 1843
- Years active: 1821–1843

Vermont's 5th congressional district is an obsolete district. It was created in 1821. It was eliminated after the 1840 census. Its last congressman was John Mattocks.

Vermont began with district representation when it was admitted as the 14th State in 1791.

From 1813 to 1821, beginning with the 13th Congress, Vermont elected its US representatives statewide at-large

After the 16th Congress, Vermont returned to electing congressmen from districts

Vermont added the 5th district in 1821, Vermont was apportioned a fifth congressional district after the 1810 census. However, this along with the likewise created sixth district were constituted at-large until 1821, and then from 1823 to 1825.

== List of members representing the district ==
Member	Party	Years	Cong ress	Electoral history	Location
District established March 4, 1821
Samuel C. Crafts (Craftsbury)	Democratic-Republican	March 4, 1821 – March 3, 1823	17th	Redistricted from the at-large district and re-elected in 1820. Redistricted to the at-large district.	1821–1823
District inactive		March 4, 1823 – March 3, 1825	18th	Vermont elected its representatives statewide at-large.	
John Mattocks (Peacham)	Anti-Jacksonian	March 4, 1825 – March 3, 1827	19th	Elected in 1824. Retired.	1825–1833
Daniel Azro Ashley Buck (Chelsea)	Anti-Jacksonian	March 4, 1827 – March 3, 1829	20th	Elected in 1826. Lost re-election.	1825–1833
William Cahoon (Lyndon)	Anti-Masonic	March 4, 1829 – March 3, 1833	21st 22nd	Elected in 1829 on the eighth ballot. Re-elected in 1830. Lost re-election.	1825–1833
Benjamin F. Deming (Danville)	Anti-Masonic	March 4, 1833 – July 11, 1834	23rd	Elected in 1833. Died.	1833–1843
Vacant		July 11, 1834 – December 2, 1834	23rd		1833–1843
Henry F. Janes (Waterbury)	Anti-Masonic	December 2, 1834 – March 3, 1837	23rd 24th	Elected in 1834. Also elected to finish Deming's term. Lost re-election.	1833–1843
Isaac Fletcher (Lyndon)	Democratic	March 4, 1837 – March 3, 1841	25th 26th	Elected in 1836. Re-elected in 1838. Lost re-election.	1833–1843
John Mattocks (Peacham)	Whig	March 4, 1841 – March 3, 1843	27th	Elected in 1840. Retired to run for Governor of Vermont.	1833–1843
District dissolved March 3, 1843
