= William Strong (Vermont politician) =

American politician

Member of the U.S. House of Representatives from Vermont
- In office March 4, 1811 – March 3, 1815
- Preceded by: Jonathan H. Hubbard (2nd); Constituency established (AL)
- Succeeded by: Luther Jewett (both)
- Constituency: 2nd district (1811-13); At-large district (1813-15)

Member of the Vermont House of Representatives
- In office 1798–1799; 1801–1802; 1815–1818

Personal details
- Born: 1763 Lebanon, Connecticut Colony, British America
- Died: January 28, 1840 (aged 76–77) Hartford, Vermont, U.S.
- Resting place: Hilltop Cemetery in Quechee, Vermont
- Party: Democratic-Republican
- Spouse: Abigail Hutchinson Strong
- Profession: Politician

William Strong (1763 – January 28, 1840) was an American businessman and politician. He served two terms as a congressman from Vermont from 1811 to 1815.

== Biography ==
Strong was born in Lebanon in the Connecticut Colony in 1763 to Benajah and Polly (Bacon) Strong. He moved with his parents to Hartford the following year. Strong's father was one of the pioneer settlers of Hartford. Strong was self-educated and worked in land surveying and farming. Strong married Abigail Hutchinson on June 17, 1793.

=== Political career ===
Strong was a member of the Vermont House of Representatives in 1798, 1799, 1801, and 1802, and was the sheriff of Windsor County from 1802 to 1810. He was elected as a Democratic-Republican US Representative to the Twelfth and Thirteenth Congresses, from March 4, 1811, until March 3, 1815.

Strong returned to Vermont politics to sit once more in the state House of Representatives from 1815 to 1818, and as a judge of the Supreme Court of Windsor County from 1819 to 1821. In 1819 he was elected to the Sixteenth Congress, and served from March 4, 1819, to March 3, 1821. In 1832 he served as one of Vermont's Presidential Electors, and voted for Anti-Masonic Party candidate William Wirt.

== Death ==
Strong died in Hartford, Vermont on January 28, 1840, and is interred at Hilltop Cemetery in Quechee, Vermont.

U.S. House of Representatives
Preceded by Jonathan H. Hubbard	Member of the U.S. House of Representatives from Vermont's 2nd congressional district 1811-1813	Succeeded by District inactive
Preceded by Seat created	Member of the U.S. House of Representatives from Vermont's at-large congressional district 1813-1815	Succeeded by Luther Jewett
