= Vermont's 6th congressional district =

- Obsolete district
- Created: 1813
- Eliminated: 1823
- Years active: 1813-1823

Vermont's 6th congressional district is an obsolete district.

== History ==
Only during a single decade (1813 to 1823), did Vermont have six seats in the United States House of Representatives.

For the first four congresses of that decade (the 13th through 16th Congresses, lasting from 1813 through 1821), Vermont's six members of the House were elected at-large. For the 17th and final Congress of that apportionment (lasting from 1821 through 1823), Vermont elected its representatives from geographical districts. After the 1820 United States census, Vermont lost one seat and went back to at-large members.

Vermont has not had six seats since 1823.

== List of member representing the district ==
Member	Party	Term	Cong ress	Electoral history	Location
District established March 4, 1821
John Mattocks (Peacham)	Democratic-Republican	March 4, 1821 – March 3, 1823	17th	Elected in 1820. Redistricted to the at-large district and lost re-election.	
District dissolved March 3, 1823

== Cite Book ==
- Martis, Kenneth C. (1989). The Historical Atlas of Political Parties in the United States Congress. New York: Macmillan Publishing Company.
- Martis, Kenneth C. (1982). The Historical Atlas of United States Congressional Districts. New York: Macmillan Publishing Company.
- Congressional Biographical Directory of the United States 1774–present
