= Vermont's 2nd congressional district =

Obsolete congressional district

- Obsolete district
- Created: 1791; 1821; 1825
- Eliminated: 1810; 1820; 1930
- Years active: 1791–1813; 1821–1823; 1825–1933

Vermont's 2nd congressional district is an obsolete district in the US state. It was created upon Vermont's admission as the 14th state in 1791. It was eliminated after the 1930 census. Its last congressman was Ernest W. Gibson, who was redistricted into the at-large district.

== List of members representing the district ==
Vermont had district representation upon admission as the 14th state on March 4, 1791. From 1813-1821, beginning with the 13th, Vermont elected its US representatives statewide at-large. After the 16th, Vermont returned to electing congressmen from districts. Vermont returned to a single at-large district after losing its second representative following redistricting resulting from the 1930 census.

Member	Party	Term	Cong ress	Electoral history
District established March 4, 1791
Vacant		March 4, 1791 – October 16, 1791	2nd	
Nathaniel Niles (West Fairlee)	Anti-Administration	October 17, 1791 – March 3, 1795	2nd 3rd	Elected in 1791. Re-elected in 1793. Lost re-election.
Daniel Buck (Norwich)	Federalist	March 4, 1795 – March 3, 1797	4th	Elected in 1795. Re-elected in 1797 but declined the seat.
Vacant		March 4, 1797 – May 23, 1797	5th	
Lewis R. Morris (Springfield)	Federalist	May 24, 1797 – March 3, 1803	5th 6th 7th	Elected to finish Buck's term. Re-elected in 1798. Re-elected in 1800. Lost re-election.
James Elliot (Brattleboro)	Federalist	March 4, 1803 – March 3, 1809	8th 9th 10th	Elected in 1803. Re-elected in 1804. Re-elected in 1806. Retired.
Jonathan H. Hubbard (Windsor)	Federalist	March 4, 1809 – March 3, 1811	11th	Elected in 1808. Lost re-election.
William Strong (Hartford)	Democratic-Republican	March 4, 1811 – March 3, 1813	12th	Elected in 1810. Redistricted to the at-large district.
District inactive		March 4, 1813 – March 3, 1821	13th 14th 15th 16th	Vermont elected its representatives statewide at-large.
Phineas White (Putney)	Democratic-Republican	March 4, 1821 – March 3, 1823	17th	Elected on the seventh ballot in 1821. Retired.
District inactive		March 4, 1823 – March 3, 1825	18th	Vermont elected its representatives statewide at-large.
Rollin C. Mallary (Poultney)	Anti-Jacksonian	March 4, 1825 – April 15, 1831	19th 20th 21st 22nd	Elected in 1824. Re-elected in 1826. Re-elected in 1828. Re-elected in 1830. Died.
Vacant		April 16, 1831 – November 1, 1831	22nd	
William Slade (Middlebury)	Anti-Masonic	November 1, 1831 – March 3, 1837	22nd 23rd 24th 25th 26th 27th	Elected to finish Mallary's term. Re-elected in 1833. Re-elected in 1834. Re-elected in 1836. Re-elected in 1838. Re-elected in 1840. Resigned to become Reporter of the Vermont Supreme Court.
William Slade (Middlebury)	Whig	March 4, 1837 – March 3, 1843	22nd 23rd 24th 25th 26th 27th	Elected to finish Mallary's term. Re-elected in 1833. Re-elected in 1834. Re-elected in 1836. Re-elected in 1838. Re-elected in 1840. Resigned to become Reporter of the Vermont Supreme Court.
Jacob Collamer (Woodstock)	Whig	March 4, 1843 – March 3, 1849	28th 29th 30th	Elected in 1843. Re-elected in 1844. Re-elected in 1846. Re-elected in 1848. Resigned to become U.S. Postmaster General.
William Hebard (Chelsea)	Whig	March 4, 1849 – March 3, 1853	31st 32nd	Elected in 1848. Re-elected in 1850. Retired.
Andrew Tracy (Woodstock)	Whig	March 4, 1853 – March 3, 1855	33rd	Elected in 1852. Retired.
Justin S. Morrill (Strafford)	Whig	March 4, 1855 – March 3, 1857	34th 35th 36th 37th 38th 39th	Elected in 1854. Re-elected in 1856. Re-elected in 1858. Re-elected in 1860. Re-elected in 1863. Re-elected in 1864. Retired to run for U.S. senator.
Justin S. Morrill (Strafford)	Republican	March 4, 1857 – March 3, 1867	34th 35th 36th 37th 38th 39th	Elected in 1854. Re-elected in 1856. Re-elected in 1858. Re-elected in 1860. Re-elected in 1863. Re-elected in 1864. Retired to run for U.S. senator.
Luke P. Poland (St. Johnsbury)	Republican	March 4, 1867 – March 3, 1875	40th 41st 42nd 43rd	Elected in 1866. Re-elected in 1868. Re-elected in 1870. Re-elected in 1872. Lost re-election.
Dudley C. Denison (Royalton)	Independent Republican	March 4, 1875 – March 3, 1877	44th 45th	Elected in 1874. Re-elected in 1876. Retired.
Dudley C. Denison (Royalton)	Republican	March 4, 1877 – March 3, 1879	44th 45th	Elected in 1874. Re-elected in 1876. Retired.
James M. Tyler (Brattleboro)	Republican	March 4, 1879 – March 3, 1883	46th 47th	Elected in 1878. Re-elected in 1880. Retired.
Luke P. Poland (St. Johnsbury)	Republican	March 4, 1883 – March 3, 1885	48th	Elected in 1882. Retired.
William W. Grout (Barton)	Republican	March 4, 1885 – March 3, 1901	49th 50th 51st 52nd 53rd 54th 55th 56th	Elected in 1884. Re-elected in 1886. Re-elected in 1888. Re-elected in 1890. Re-elected in 1892. Re-elected in 1894. Re-elected in 1896. Re-elected in 1898. Retired.
Kittredge Haskins (Brattleboro)	Republican	March 4, 1901 – March 3, 1909	57th 58th 59th 60th	Elected in 1900. Re-elected in 1902. Re-elected in 1904. Re-elected in 1906. Lost re-nomination.
Frank Plumley (Northfield)	Republican	March 4, 1909 – March 3, 1915	61st 62nd 63rd	Elected in 1908. Re-elected in 1910. Re-elected in 1912. Retired.
Porter H. Dale (Island Pond)	Republican	March 4, 1915 – August 11, 1923	64th 65th 66th 67th 68th	Elected in 1914. Re-elected in 1916. Re-elected in 1918. Re-elected in 1920. Re-elected in 1922. Resigned to become U.S. senator.
Vacant		August 12, 1923 – November 5, 1923	68th	
Ernest W. Gibson (Brattleboro)	Republican	November 6, 1923 – March 3, 1933	68th 69th 70th 71st 72nd	Elected to finish Dale's term. Re-elected in 1924. Re-elected in 1926. Re-elected in 1928. Re-elected in 1930. Redistricted to the at-large district.
District dissolved March 3, 1933
