= Frederick G. Fleetwood =

American politician

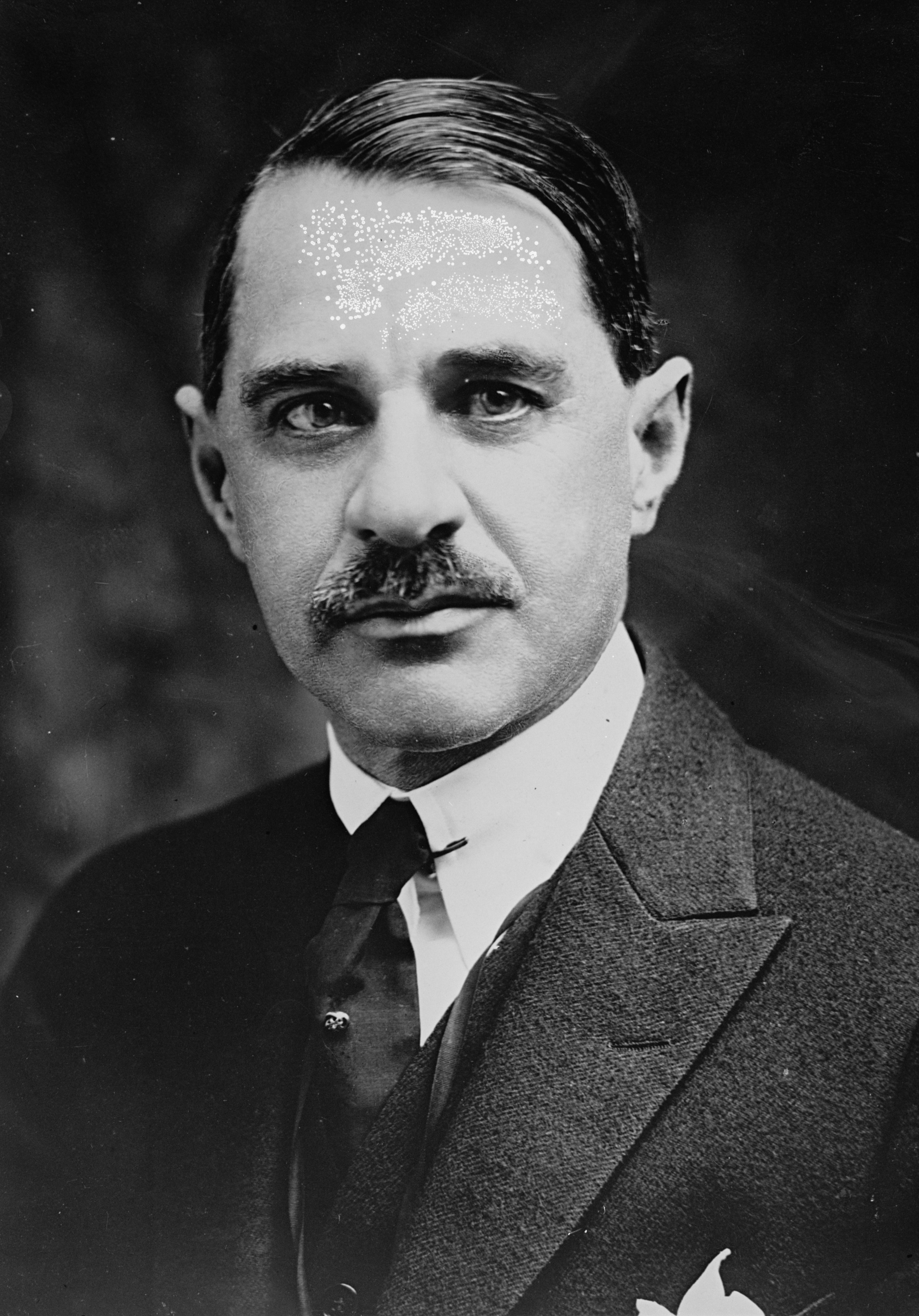
- Library of Congress, Prints and Photographs Division

Member of the United States House of Representatives from Vermont's 1st district
- In office March 4, 1923 – March 3, 1925
- Preceded by: Frank L. Greene
- Succeeded by: Elbert S. Brigham

Secretary of State of Vermont
- In office 1917–1919
- Governor: Horace F. Graham
- Preceded by: Guy W. Bailey
- Succeeded by: Harry A. Black
- In office 1902–1908
- Governor: John G. McCullough; Charles J. Bell; Fletcher D. Proctor
- Preceded by: Fred A. Howland
- Succeeded by: Guy W. Bailey

Member of the Vermont House of Representatives from Morristown
- In office 1900–1902
- Preceded by: George Henry Terrill
- Succeeded by: Charles H. A. Stafford

State's Attorney of Lamoille County, Vermont
- In office 1896–1898
- Preceded by: Roger W. Hulburd
- Succeeded by: Levi J. Thompson

Personal details
- Born: September 27, 1868 St. Johnsbury, Vermont, U.S.
- Died: January 28, 1938 (aged 69) Morrisville, Vermont, U.S.
- Resting place: Pleasant View Cemetery, Morrisville, Vermont
- Party: Republican
- Spouse: Ruth Louise Slocum (m. 1929)
- Education: University of Vermont (attended); Harvard College (BA, 1891)
- Profession: Attorney

Frederick Gleed Fleetwood (September 27, 1868 – January 28, 1938) was an American lawyer and politician from Vermont. He was most notable for his service as Secretary of State of Vermont (1902–1908, 1917–1919) and a U.S. Representative (1923–1925).

A Republican, Fleetwood served in local offices including town clerk and treasurer of Morristown. He served as State's Attorney of Lamoille County from 1896 to 1898 and a member of the Vermont House of Representatives from 1900 to 1902. He was Vermont's secretary of state from 1902 to 1909 and again from 1917 to 1919. Fleetwood served one term in the U.S. House, 1923 to 1925. He died in Morrisville on January 28, 1938, and was buried at Morrisville's Pleasant View Cemetery.

== Early life and education ==
Fleetwood was born in St. Johnsbury, Vermont on September 27, 1868, the son of Henry W. Fleetwood and Laura Kenney Fleetwood. He attended the common schools of St. Johnsbury, and graduated from St. Johnsbury Academy in 1886.

After his high school graduation, Fleetwood attended the University of Vermont from 1886 to 1888, where he became a member of the Sigma Phi fraternity. He then transferred to Harvard College, from which he received his Bachelor of Arts degree in 1891. He then enrolled at Harvard College, from which he graduated in 1891. He studied law, attained admission to the bar in 1894, and practiced in Morrisville, Vermont as the partner of Phillip K. Gleed, who was his stepfather.

== Career ==
Fleetwood served as secretary of the Commission on Revision of Vermont Statutes from 1893 until 1894. He studied law with his stepfather, Phillip K. Gleed, was admitted to the bar in 1894, and began the practice of law in Morrisville, Vermont as Gleed's partner. Fleetwood served as State's Attorney for Lamoille County from 1896 until 1898. He was elected town clerk and treasurer of Morristown, serving from 1896 until 1900. Fleetwood was active in several fraternal organizations, including the Freemasons, Knights of Pythias, and the Grange.

Fleetwood served as a member of the Vermont House of Representatives from 1900 until 1902. During his term, he was chair of the committee on Temperance and a member of the Judiciary Committee. He was one of the presidential electors from Vermont in 1900, and was the elector designated to carry Vermont's votes to the U.S. Capitol for tabulation. Fleetwood was Secretary of the State of Vermont and a member of the state board of insurance commissioners from 1902 until 1908. In 1904, Fleetwood was second vice president of the state commissioners that oversaw Vermont's exhibit at the Louisiana Purchase Exposition.

From 1910 until 1913 he served as a director of the St. Johnsbury and Lake Champlain Railroad. In August 1917, Guy W. Bailey resigned as secretary of state; Fleetwood was appointed to succeed him and served until January 1919.

== U.S. Representative ==
In 1922, Fleetwood was elected to the 68th Congress as a Republican, and he served one term, March 4, 1923 to March 3, 1925. In early December 1923, he was in Washington, D.C. to attend his first congressional session when he was struck by a delivery truck while crossing a street near the U.S. Capitol. He sustained a concussion and other injuries, and was hospitalized for a week.

Fleetwood's committee assignments included Education, Insular Affairs, Invalid Pensions, and Public Lands. During his congressional term, Fleetwood devoted effort to local concerns, including advocating for American Civil War pensions for widows of Union Army veterans and compensation to Vermonters for property lost during the training and equipping of troops for World War I. In addition, he advocated for construction of a new post office and federal office building for Rutland. According to contemporary press accounts, Fleetwood did not find travel to Washington and back and the routine of a representative to his liking, and he announced in May 1924 that he would not be a candidate for renomination.

== Later life ==
After leaving Congress, Fleetwood resumed the practice of law and took part in business and civic activities, including serving on the board of directors of Morrisville's Union Savings Bank and Trust Company. In addition, he was a vice president and director of Morrisville's Citizen's Telephone Company. Among the prospective students who studied law in his office was Harold C. Sylvester, who later served on the Vermont Supreme Court.

In 1929, Fleetwood married Ruth Louise Slocum (1887–1962). They were married until his death, and had no children.

In January 1938, Fleetwood was hospitalized with pneumonia. He died in Morrisville on January 28. Fleetwood was buried at Pleasant View Cemetery in Morrisville.

Party political offices
Preceded by Fred A. Howland	Republican nominee for Secretary of State of Vermont; 1902, 1904, 1906	Succeeded by Guy W. Bailey
U.S. House of Representatives
Preceded by Frank L. Greene	Member of the U.S. House of Representatives from Vermont's 1st congressional district March 4, 1923 – March 3, 1925	Succeeded by Elbert S. Brigham
