= 1918 Vermont gubernatorial election =

- November 5, 1918
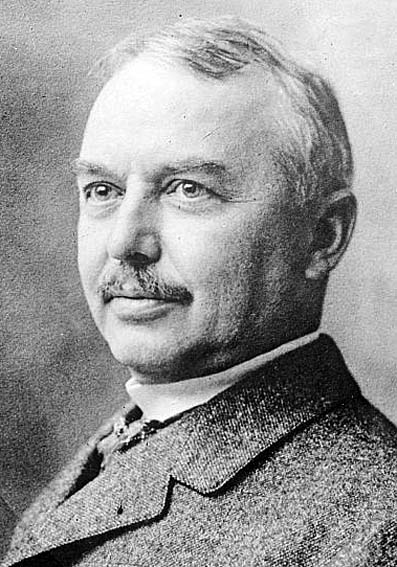

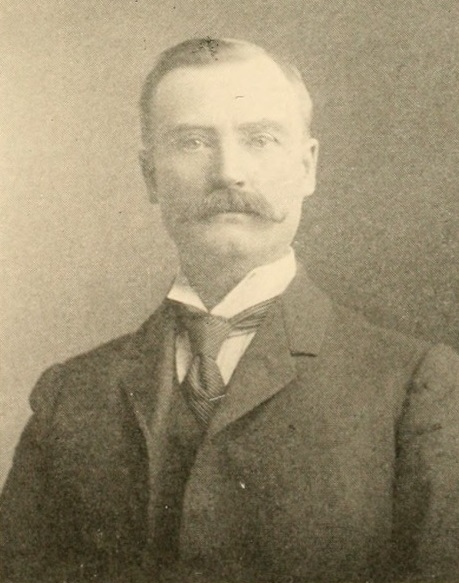
Nominee	Percival W. Clement	William B. Mayo
Party	Republican	Democratic
Popular vote	28,358	13,859
Percentage	67.00%	32.75%
- Clement: 40–50% 50–60% 60–70% 70–80% 80–90% 90-100% Mayo: 40–50% 50–60% 60–70% 80–90% Tie: 50% No Vote/Data
Governor before election
Horace F. Graham
Republican
Elected Governor
Percival W. Clement
Republican

The 1918 Vermont gubernatorial election took place on November 5, 1918. Incumbent Republican Horace F. Graham, per the "Mountain Rule", did not run for re-election to a second term as Governor of Vermont. Republican candidate Percival W. Clement defeated Democratic candidate William B. Mayo to succeed him.

== Republican primary ==
=== Results ===
Republican primary results
Party	Candidate	Votes	%	±%
Republican	Percival W. Clement	12,060	37.0	
Republican	Charles H. Darling	11,403	35.0	
Republican	Frank E. Howe	9,122	28.0	
Republican	Other	2	0.0	
Total votes		32,587	100.0	

== Democratic primary ==
=== Results ===
Democratic primary results
Party	Candidate	Votes	%	±%
Democratic	William B. Mayo	2,486	99.9	
Democratic	Other	4	0.1	
Total votes		2,490	100.0	

== General election ==
=== Results ===
1918 Vermont gubernatorial election
Party	Candidate	Votes	%	±%
Republican	Percival W. Clement	28,358	67.00	
Democratic	William B. Mayo	12,517	29.58	
Progressive	William B. Mayo	1,342	3.17	
Total	William B. Mayo	13,859	32.75	
N/A	Other	106	0.25	
Total votes		42,323	100.0	
