= William B. Mayo (politician) =

Medical doctor and politician from Vermont

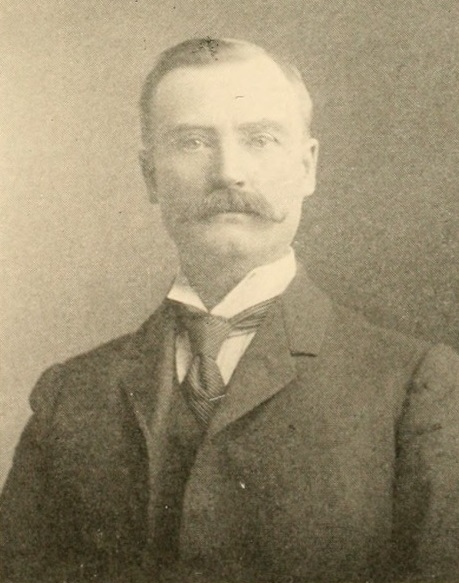
- From 1903's Vermont, A Souvenir of Its Government, 1902-03

Member of the Vermont Senate
- In office 1902–1904 Serving with Nelson D. Phelps, George F. Sibley
- Preceded by: Zed S. Stanton, Joseph A. DeBoer
- Succeeded by: William A. Lord, Merton D. Wells, Oscar G. Eaton
- Constituency: Washington County

Member of the Vermont House of Representatives
- In office 1915–1917
- Preceded by: Charles A. Plumley
- Succeeded by: Matthias Cannon Jr.
- In office 1900–1902
- Preceded by: James Morse
- Succeeded by: Marshall D. Smith
- In office 1884–1888
- Preceded by: Frank Plumley
- Succeeded by: Charles Dole
- Constituency: Northfield

Personal details
- Born: January 3, 1854 Moretown, Vermont, U.S.
- Died: April 23, 1930 (aged 76) Northfield, Vermont, U.S.
- Resting place: Williamstown Village Cemetery, Williamstown, Vermont, U.S.
- Party: Democratic
- Spouse(s): Emma L. Lynde (m. 1873); Prudence Stickney (m. 1913)
- Children: 11
- Education: Vermont State Normal School; Homeopathic Medical College of the State of New York
- Profession: Medical doctor

William B. Mayo (January 3, 1854 – April 23, 1930) was an American medical doctor, businessman, and politician from Vermont. A Democrat during the period when Republicans won all statewide elections, he served terms in both the Vermont Senate and Vermont House of Representatives. Mayo was the party's nominee in the 1922 U.S. Senate election and the 1916 and 1918 Vermont gubernatorial elections, and was its 1888 nominee for secretary of state.

== Early life ==
William Barnabas Mayo was born in Moretown, Vermont on January 3, 1854, the son of Barnabas Mayo and Mary (Howe) Mayo. He was raised and educated in Moretown, and was an 1874 graduate of the Vermont State Normal School in Randolph. He then began attendance at the Homeopathic Medical College of the State of New York, from which he graduated as a Doctor of Medicine in 1877. Mayo settled in Northfield, where he established a successful practice.

== Business and civic career ==
In addition to practicing medicine, Mayo was involved in several business ventures, including purchasing the Paine block, a commercial building that had been constructed by Governor Charles Paine. Mayo turned the South Main Street building so that it faced East Street, and carried out extensive repairs. The Paine Block burned in an 1899 fire, and he constructed a new one on the site. The Northfield House, a hotel constructed by Charles Paine, was destroyed by fire in 1879; in 1899, Mayo bought the site, where he constructed a new commercial building. His additional enterprises included construction of the Mayo Building, the Armory block, and the Cardel block.

Mayo was a member of the Alpha Sigma Pi fraternity and an officer of the Vermont Medical Society. In addition, he was active in the Freemasons and was a longtime member of the Conversational Club of Northfield. Long interested in education, Mayo served on Northfield's school board from 1882 to 1886. In 1885, he was appointed to the Norwich University Board of Trustees, and he was a longtime member of the board's executive committee. In 1910, Norwich presented Mayo the honorary degree of Master of Arts. Mayo also served in local offices, including village trustee. When the Northfield Trust Company was organized in 1908, he was appointed to the original board of directors.

== Political career ==
A Democrat during the more than 100-year period when Republican won every statewide election, Mayo was a delegate to numerous local and state conventions, and was the longtime chairman of the Washington County Democratic Committee. He represented Northfield in the Vermont House of Representatives from 1884 to 1888. In 1888, he was the party's unsuccessful nominee for secretary of state, losing the general election to incumbent Charles W. Porter.

In 1900, Mayo was elected to represent Washington County in the Vermont Senate, and he served until 1902. After winning another Vermont House term in 1914, he was the Democratic candidate in the 1916 and 1918 Vermont gubernatorial elections, and lost to Horace F. Graham and Percival W. Clement. Mayo was the Democratic nominee in the 1922 United States Senate election, and lost to U.S. Representative Frank L. Greene.

=== Electoral history ===
The results of Mayo's campaigns for statewide office were:

1888 election for Vermont Secretary of State

Charles W. Porter, Republican, 48,415, 69.8%

William B. Mayo, Democratic, 19,528, 28.2%

Archibald O. Ferguson, Prohibition, 1,371, 2.0%

Write-Ins, 2, 0%

Total Votes Cast, 69,316

1916 election for Governor of Vermont

Horace F. Graham, Republican, 43,265, 71.1%

William B. Mayo, Democratic, 15,789, 25.9%

W. R. Rowland, Socialist, 920, 1.5%

Lester W. Hanson, Prohibition, 876, 1.4%

Write-Ins, 4, 0%

Total Votes Cast, 60,854

1918 election for Governor of Vermont

Percival W. Clement, Republican, 28,358, 67.0%

William B. Mayo, Democratic/Progressive, 13,859, 32.7%

Write-Ins, 106, 0.3%

Total Votes Cast, 42,323

1922 election for United States Senator from Vermont

Frank L. Greene, Republican/Prohibition, 47,669, 69.0%

William B. Mayo, Democratic/Republican, 21,375, 31.0%

Total Votes Cast, 69,044

== Death and burial ==
Mayo died in Northfield on April 23, 1930. He was buried at Williamstown Village Cemetery in Williamstown, Vermont.

=== Legacy ===
Mayo Healthcare is a Northfield senior citizens' residential and health care facility. This nursing home began in the 1930s as Mayo Hospital, a facility created to honor Mayo.

== Family ==
In February 1873, Mayo married Emma L. Lynde of Williamstown, Vermont. They were the parents of four children, all of whom died in infancy. The Mayos subsequently adopted two children, daughter Gladys C. Crane (1895–1915) and son Robert John Mayo (1896–1975). Emma Lynde Mayo died in 1911, and in 1913, Mayo married Prudence Stickney. Mayo and his second wife were the parents of daughters Anna and Deborah and sons William Thomas, and Edgar.

Party political offices
| Preceded by William Wallace Rider | Democratic nominee for Secretary of State of Vermont; 1888 | Succeeded by George F. O. Kimball |
| Preceded by Harland Bradley Howe | Democratic nominee for Governor of Vermont; 1916, 1918 | Succeeded by Fred C. Martin |
| Preceded by Oscar C. Miller | Democratic nominee for U.S. Senator from Vermont (Class 1); 1922 | Succeeded by Fred C. Martin |
