= 1906 Vermont gubernatorial election =

- September 4, 1906
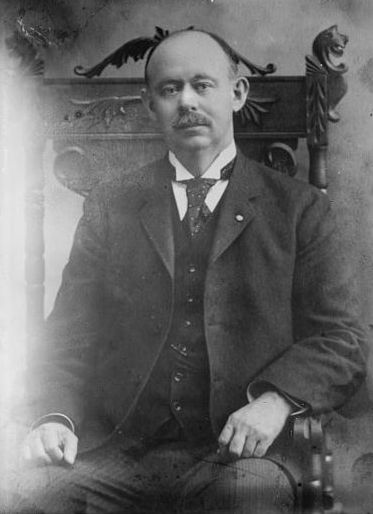

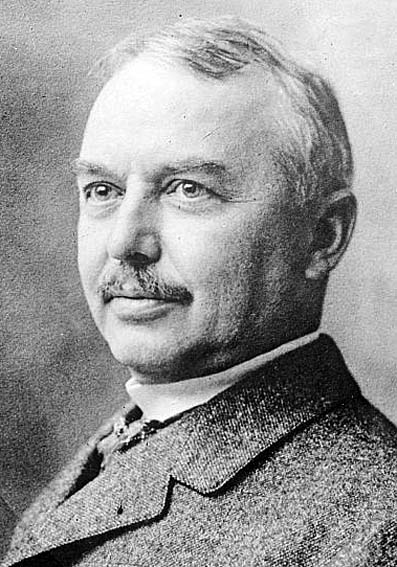
Nominee	Fletcher D. Proctor	Percival W. Clement
Party	Republican	Independent
Alliance		Democratic
Popular vote	42,332	26,912
Percentage	60.05%	38.18%
- County results Proctor: 40–50% 50–60% 60–70% 70–80% Clement: 40–50%
Governor before election
Charles J. Bell
Republican
Elected Governor
Fletcher D. Proctor
Republican

The 1906 Vermont gubernatorial election took place on September 4, 1906. In keeping with the Republican Party's "Mountain Rule", incumbent Republican Charles J. Bell did not run for a second term as Governor of Vermont. At the start of the year, Percival W. Clement and Fletcher D. Proctor were the leading candidates for the Republican nomination. When it became clear that Proctor had the support of state Republican convention delegates, Clement ended his campaign for the nomination. He filed as an Independent candidate for the general election and was subsequently endorsed by the Democratic Party. In the general election, Proctor easily defeated Clement.

== Results ==
1906 Vermont gubernatorial election
Party	Candidate	Votes	%	±%
Republican	Fletcher D. Proctor	42,332	60.05	
Independent/Democratic	Percival W. Clement	26,912	38.18	
Prohibition	Lester W. Hanson	733	1.04	
Socialist	Timothy Sullivan	512	0.73	
N/A	Other	4	0.00	
Total votes		70,493	100.0	
