= Charles A. Plumley =

American politician (1875–1964)

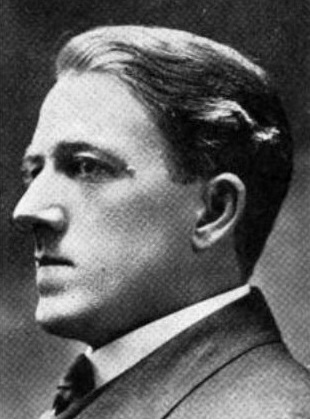
- Constituency: Northfield

Member of the United States House of Representatives from Vermont's at-large district
- In office January 16, 1934 – January 3, 1951
- Preceded by: Ernest Willard Gibson
- Succeeded by: Winston L. Prouty

Speaker of the Vermont House of Representatives
- In office 1912–1915
- Preceded by: Frank E. Howe
- Succeeded by: John E. Weeks

Member of the Vermont House of Representatives
- In office 1912–1915
- Preceded by: Frank N. Carpenter
- Succeeded by: William B. Mayo

Personal details
- Born: Charles Albert Plumley; April 14, 1875 Northfield, Vermont, US
- Died: October 31, 1964 (aged 89) Barre, Vermont, US
- Resting place: Mount Hope Cemetery in Northfield, Vermont
- Party: Republican
- Spouse: Emilie Adele Stevens Plumley
- Children: Allan R. Plumley, Fletcher D.P. Plumley and Evelyn Stevens Plumley Adams
- Parent: Frank Plumley (father)
- Profession: Politician, Lawyer

Charles Albert Plumley (April 14, 1875 – October 31, 1964) was an American lawyer and politician. He served as a Republican U.S. Representative from Vermont, and was the son of U.S. Representative Frank Plumley.

== Biography ==
Plumley was born in Northfield, Washington County, Vermont, to Frank Plumley and Lavinia Fletcher Plumley. He attended Northfield High School. In 1896 he graduated from Norwich University in Northfield, Vermont with a Bachelor of Arts, and he received his Master of Arts degree from Norwich in 1899. Plumley also received several honorary degrees, including an LL.D. (1921) and Doctor of Letters (1947) from Norwich, and LL.D. degrees from Middlebury College (1922), Boston University (1940), and the University of Vermont (1941).

=== Early career ===
Plumley served as an assistant secretary to the Vermont State Senate in 1894. He was principal and superintendent of the Northfield grade school and Northfield High School from 1896 to 1900. He was a captain in the Vermont National Guard by 1901, and a colonel in the Officers’ Reserve Corps.

He studied law and was admitted to the bar in 1903; beginning the practice of law in Northfield. He served as Secretary of the French-Venezuela Mixed Commission in 1906. He was a member of the Vermont House of Representatives from 1912 to 1915, serving as Speaker of the Vermont House of Representatives from 1912 to 1915 and as Commissioner of Taxes for the State of Vermont from 1912 to 1919.

Plumley was general counsel and tax attorney for Firestone in Akron, Ohio, from 1919 to 1920. He then practiced law in partnership with his father and Murdock A. Campbell. He also served as president of Norwich University from 1920 to 1934, and as reading clerk of the Republican National Conventions in 1936 and 1940. He was also involved in the banking industry.

=== Congress ===
In 1934 Plumley was elected as a Republican to the Seventy-third Congress to fill the vacancy caused by the resignation of Ernest W. Gibson. Plumley was reelected to the Seventy-fourth and to the seven succeeding Congresses, serving from January 16, 1934, to January 3, 1951, as U.S. Representative from Vermont (at-large).

He was not a candidate for renomination in 1950. After leaving Congress, he resumed the practice of law in Northfield, Vermont.

== Family life ==
Plumley was married to Emilie Adele Stevens Plumley in 1900 and they had three children together, Allan R. Plumley, Fletcher D. P. Plumley (named for Governor Fletcher Dutton Proctor) and Evelyn Stevens Plumley Adams.

== Death and legacy ==
Plumley died on October 31, 1964, in Barre, Vermont. He is interred at Mount Hope Cemetery in Northfield, Vermont.

Plumley Armory on the campus of Norwich University was named after Plumley in 1962. The armory houses military and athletic facilities, and was built in 1929.

U.S. House of Representatives
Preceded by Ernest W. Gibson	Member of the U.S. House of Representatives from Vermont's at-large congressional district January 16, 1934 – January 3, 1951	Succeeded by Winston L. Prouty
