= 1902 Vermont gubernatorial election =

- September 2, 1902
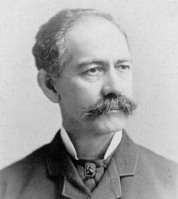

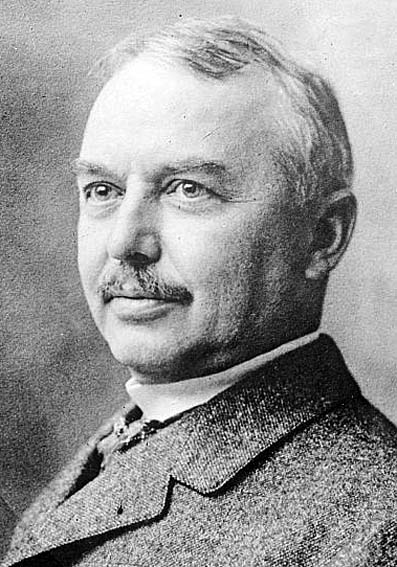

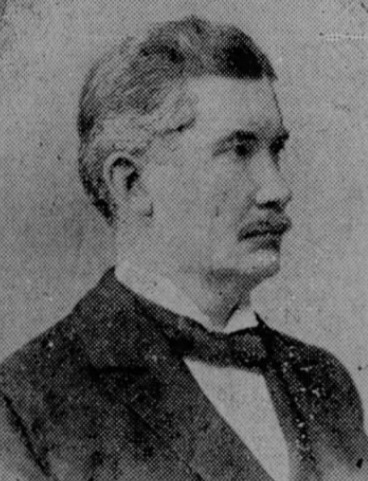
Candidate	John G. McCullough	Percival W. Clement	Felix W. McGettrick
Party	Republican	Local Option	Democratic
Electoral vote	164	59	45
Popular vote	31,864	28,201	7,364
Percentage	45.56%	40.33%	10.53%
- McCullough: 30-40% 40–50% 50–60% 60–70% 70–80% 80–90% 90-100% Clement: 30-40% 40–50% 50–60% 60–70% 70–80% McGettrick: 30-40% 60–70% Tie: 30-40% No Vote/Data
Governor before election
William W. Stickney
Republican
Elected Governor
John G. McCullough
Republican

The 1902 Vermont gubernatorial election took place on September 2, 1902. Incumbent Republican William W. Stickney, per the "Mountain Rule", did not run for re-election to a second term as Governor of Vermont. Republican candidate John G. McCullough defeated Local Option candidate Percival W. Clement and Democratic candidate Felix W. McGettrick to succeed him. Since no candidate won a majority of the popular vote, the election was decided by the Vermont General Assembly in accordance with the state constitution, where McCullough was elected with 164 votes to 59 for Clement and 45 for McGettrick.

In terms of the popular vote margin, the 1902 election was the closest of the Mountain Rule era. (Note: In the next closest, 1912, the margin was almost 10 percent.)

== General election ==
=== Candidates ===
- Percival W. Clement, state senator and former mayor of Rutland (Local Option)
- John G. McCullough, former state senator, railway executive, and Attorney General of California (Republican)
- Felix W. McGettrick (Democratic)
- Joel O. Sherburne (Prohibition)

=== Results ===
1902 Vermont gubernatorial election
Party	Candidate	Votes	%	±%
Republican	John G. McCullough	31,864	45.56	
Local Option	Percival W. Clement	28,201	40.33	
Democratic	Felix W. McGettrick	7,364	10.53	
Prohibition	Joel O. Sherburne	2,498	3.57	
N/A	Other	8	0.01	
Total votes		69,935	100.0	
