= 1904 Vermont gubernatorial election =

- September 6, 1904
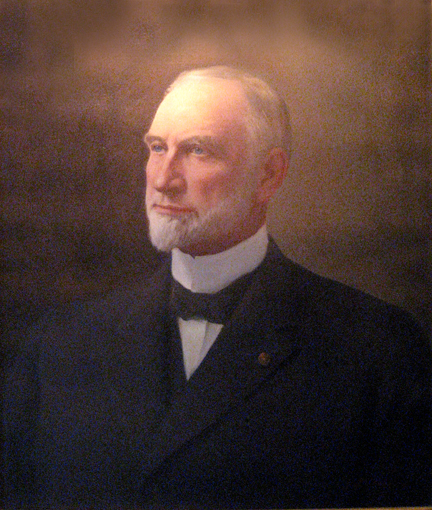

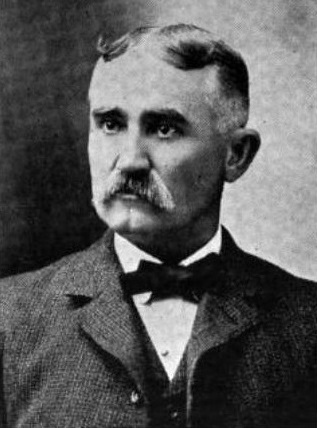
Nominee	Charles J. Bell	Eli H. Porter
Party	Republican	Democratic
Popular vote	48,115	16,556
Percentage	72.22%	24.85%
- Bell: 40–50% 50–60% 60–70% 70–80% 80–90% 90-100% Porter: 40–50% 50–60% 60–70% No Vote/Data
Governor before election
John G. McCullough
Republican
Elected Governor
Charles J. Bell
Republican

The 1904 Vermont gubernatorial election took place on September 6, 1904. Incumbent Republican John G. McCullough, per the "Mountain Rule", did not run for re-election to a second term as Governor of Vermont. Republican candidate Charles J. Bell defeated Democratic candidate Eli H. Porter to succeed him.

== General election ==
=== Candidates ===
- Charles J. Bell, secretary of the Vermont Board of Agriculture and former state senator from Walden (Republican)
- Homer F. Comings (Prohibition)
- Clarence E. Morse (Socialist)
- Eli H. Porter, former member of the Vermont House of Representatives, member of the Vermont Railroad Commission (Democratic)

=== Results ===
1904 Vermont gubernatorial election
Party	Candidate	Votes	%	±%
Republican	Charles J. Bell	48,115	72.22	
Democratic	Eli H. Porter	16,556	24.85	
Prohibition	Homer F. Comings	1,175	1.76	
Socialist	Clarence E. Morse	769	1.16	
N/A	Other	7	0.01	
Total votes		66,622	100.0	

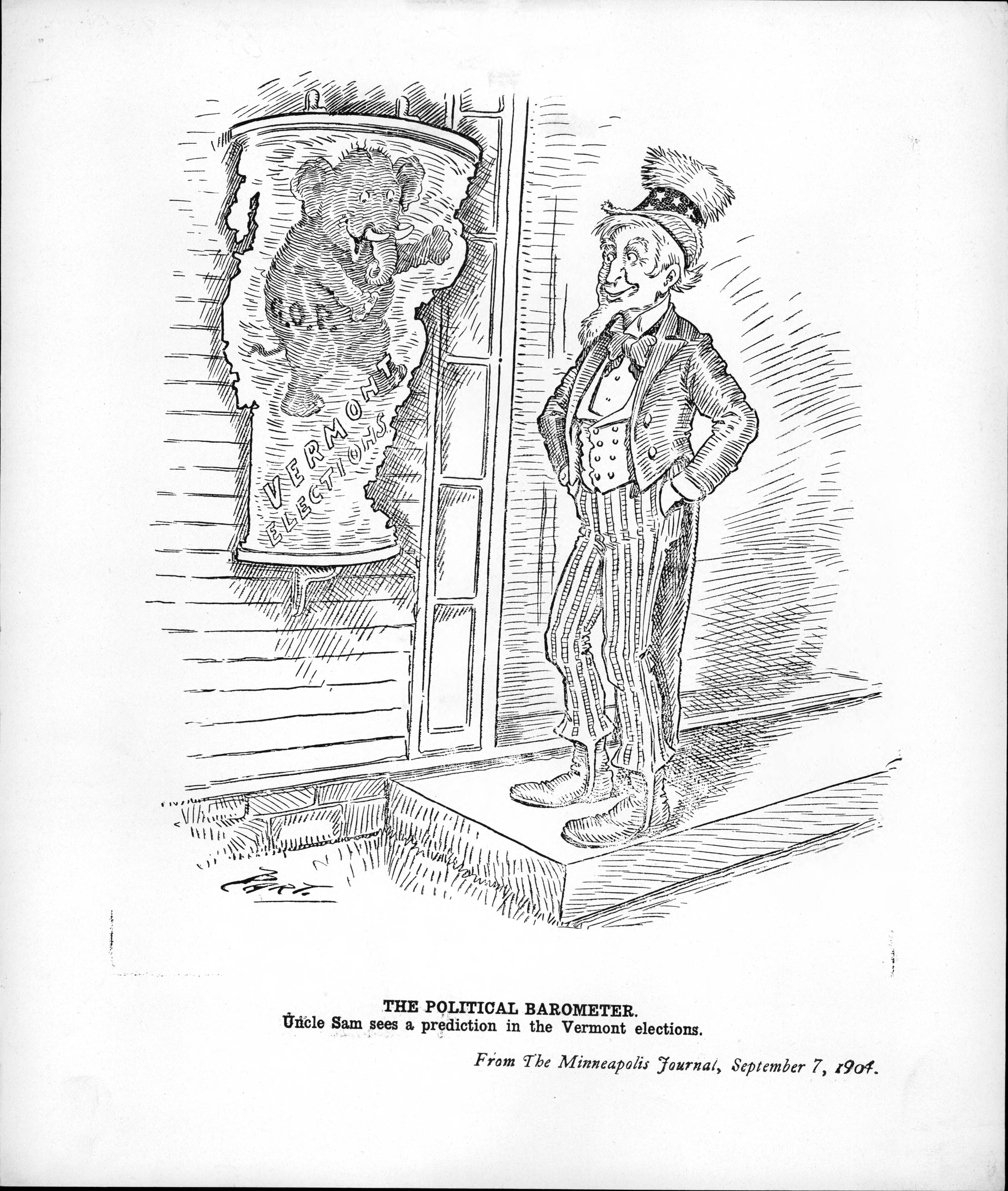
Cartoon depicting Republican victory in the 1904 Vermont gubernatorial election
