= Fred A. Howland =

American politician

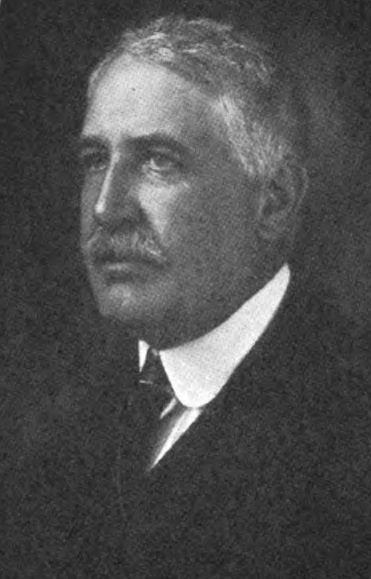

Secretary of State of Vermont
- In office 1898–1900
- Governor: Edward C. Smith
- Preceded by: Chauncey W. Brownell
- In office 1900–1902
- Governor: Edward C. Smith
- Succeeded by: Frederick G. Fleetwood

Personal details
- Born: Fred Arthur Howland; November 10, 1864 Franconia, New Hampshire, US
- Died: March 30, 1953 (aged 88)
- Education: Dartmouth College
- Profession: Attorney and president National Life Insurance Company

Fred Arthur Howland (November 10, 1864 – March 30, 1953) was a Vermont attorney, businessman, and Republican politician. He served as Secretary of State of Vermont and president of the National Life Insurance Company.

== Early life ==
Fred Arthur Howland was born in Franconia, New Hampshire on November 10, 1864. His father, Moses Nathan Howland (1833-1906) was a dentist, and his mother Sylvia Ann Shipman Howland (1841-1901) was a sister of Mary Ellen Shipman (1846—1893), the wife of William P. Dillingham.

Fred Howland was educated in New Hampshire and graduated from Phillips Andover Academy in 1883. He graduated from Dartmouth College in 1887. While at Dartmouth, he was a founding member of the senior society Casque and Gauntlet. Howland studied law with Dillingham, and was admitted to the bar in 1890.

== career ==
When Dillingham served as Governor of Vermont from 1888 to 1890, Howland was his Secretary of Civil and Military Affairs (chief assistant); Howland succeeded Fletcher D. Proctor, who had held this post during the administration of Ebenezer J. Ormsbee. Howland served as second assistant clerk of the Vermont House of Representatives during the 1890 legislative session.

After attaining admission to the bar, Howland practiced in Minneapolis, Minnesota, but he soon returned to New Hampshire to become the partner of Ossian Ray in Lancaster. After Ray died in January 1892, Howland joined the Montpelier, Vermont firm of Dillingham and Hiram A. Huse; when he became a partner, the firm was renamed Dillingham, Huse & Howland.

During the 1892 and 1894 legislative sessions, Howland was first assistant clerk of the Vermont House. During the 1896 session, he served as Clerk of the House, succeeding John H. Merrifield. He was succeeded as clerk by Thomas C. Cheney. In 1896 he was elected state's attorney of Washington County, succeeding Zed S. Stanton; he served until 1898.

In 1898, Howland was the successful Republican nominee for Secretary of State. He was reelected in 1900, and served from 1898 to 1902. He was not a candidate for reelection in 1902.

In 1903, Howland joined the National Life Insurance Company as general counsel. In 1909 he was named the company's first vice president. In 1916, Howland succeeded Joseph A. De Boer as National Life's president. He served as president until 1937 when he was succeeded by Elbert S. Brigham. Howland served as chairman of the board of directors from 1937 to 1943, and remained on the board of directors as honorary chairman until 1950. Howland's other business activities included membership on the boards of the New England Electric System, Barre and Chelsea Railroad, Central Vermont Railway, Union Mutual Fire Insurance Company, Green Mountain Power, Rock of Ages Corporation, and Montpelier National Bank.

Howland was also a civic activist; in addition to serving on the board of trustees of the Vermont State Library, he was also a trustee of the Kellogg-Hubbard Library in Montpelier and Vermont Junior College.

== Death and burial ==
Howland died in Montpelier on March 30, 1953. He was buried at Green Mount Cemetery in Montpelier.

== Family ==
In September 1894, Howland married Rena Forbush of Lancaster, New Hampshire, who died the month after their wedding. In 1899, he married Margaret Louise Dewey of Montpelier. Margaret Dewey was the daughter of Edward Dewey, who served as president of National Life. She was the granddaughter of Julius Yemans Dewey, who was National Life's first president, and the niece of both Charles Dewey, who also served as president of National Life, and Admiral George Dewey.

Fred Howland and Margaret Dewey were the parents of four daughters; Louise (Mrs. Edwin Clark), Sylvia (Mrs. Paul Sample), Susan, and Emily (Mrs. William Mansfield).

== Sources ==
=== Newspapers ===
- "E. S. Brigham New Presdt. National Life; Succeeds Howland". Burlington Free Press. Burlington, VT. February 2, 1937. p. 1.
- "Howland Retires from National Life". Burlington Free Press. Burlington, VT. January 27, 1943. p. 2.
- "Fred Howland, Long National Life Head, Dies". Burlington Free Press. Burlington, VT. Vermont Press Bureau. March 31, 1953. p. 1.
- "Services Held for Fred Howland; Church is Filled". Burlington Free Press. Burlington, VT. April 4, 1953. p. 14.

=== Magazines ===
- Smith, Arthur L. J. (January 20, 1916). "President F. A. Howland: New Executive Head of the National Life of Montpelier; Succeeding the Late J. A. De Boer". The Spectator: An American Weekly Review of Insurance. New York, NY: The Spectator Company. p. 34.

=== Books ===
- Carl, Rita Shipman (1962). The Shipman Family in America. Ann Arbor, MI: Shipman Historical Association. p. 382.
- Derby, George (1956). The National Cyclopædia of American Biography. Vol. 41. New York, NY: James T. White. p. 13.
- Porter, John Sherman (1944). Moody's Manual of Investments. New York, NY: Moody's Investors Service. p. 1034.
- Vermont Bar Association (1954). Report of Proceedings of the Annual Meeting of the Vermont Bar Association. Vol. 48. Barre, VT: Argus and Patriot Steam Book Press. p. 50.

=== Internet ===
- "Clerks of the Vermont House of Representatives, 1778-1993". History of Elected Officials. Montpelier, VT: Vermont House of Representatives. 1993.

Party political offices
| Preceded by Chauncey W. Brownell | Republican nominee for Secretary of State of Vermont; 1898, 1900 | Succeeded by Frederick G. Fleetwood |
Business positions
| Preceded by Joseph A. De Boer | President of the National Life Group; 1916–1937 | Succeeded by Elbert S. Brigham |
Political offices
| Preceded by Chauncey W. Brownell | Vermont Secretary of State; 1898–1902 | Succeeded by Frederick G. Fleetwood |
| Preceded by John H. Merrifield | Clerk of the Vermont House of Representatives; 1896–1898 | Succeeded by Thomas C. Cheney |
| Preceded by Zed S. Stanton | State's Attorney of Washington County, Vermont; 1896–1898 | Succeeded by Richard A. Hoar |
| Preceded by Fletcher D. Proctor | Vermont Secretary of Civil and Military Affairs; 1888–1890 | Succeeded by Henry M. McFarland |
