= Harriet Blackstone =

American painter

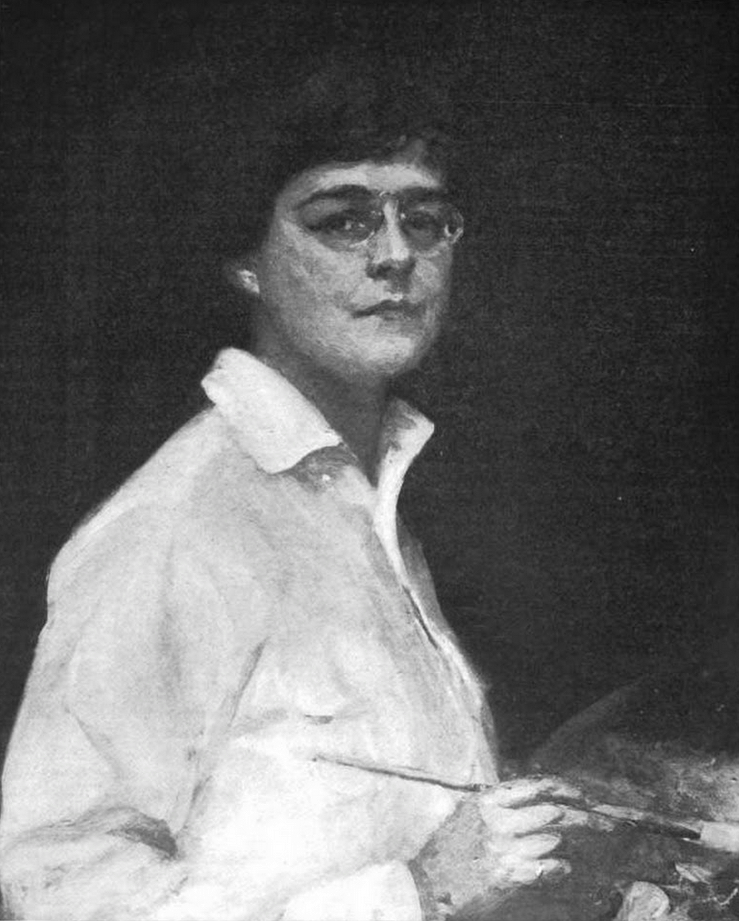
Harriet Blackstone, Self-Portrait, ca. 1918

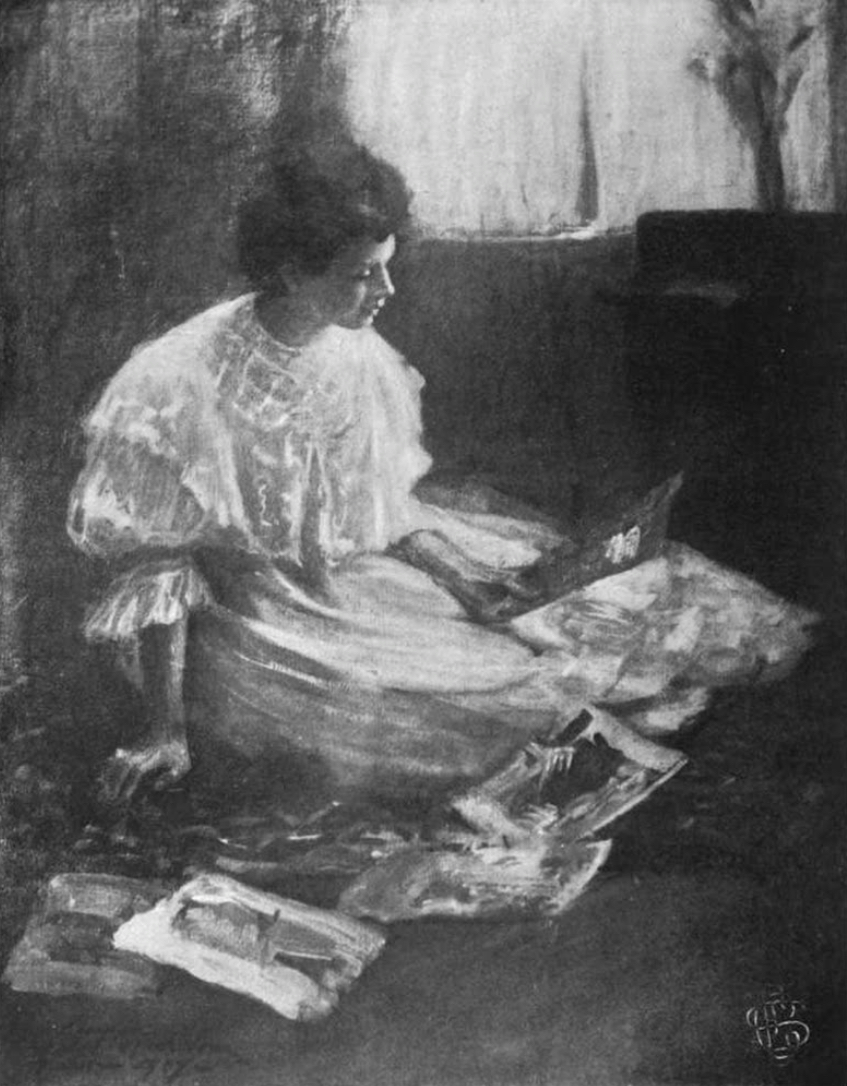
Harriet Blackstone, Japanese Prints, ca. 1918.

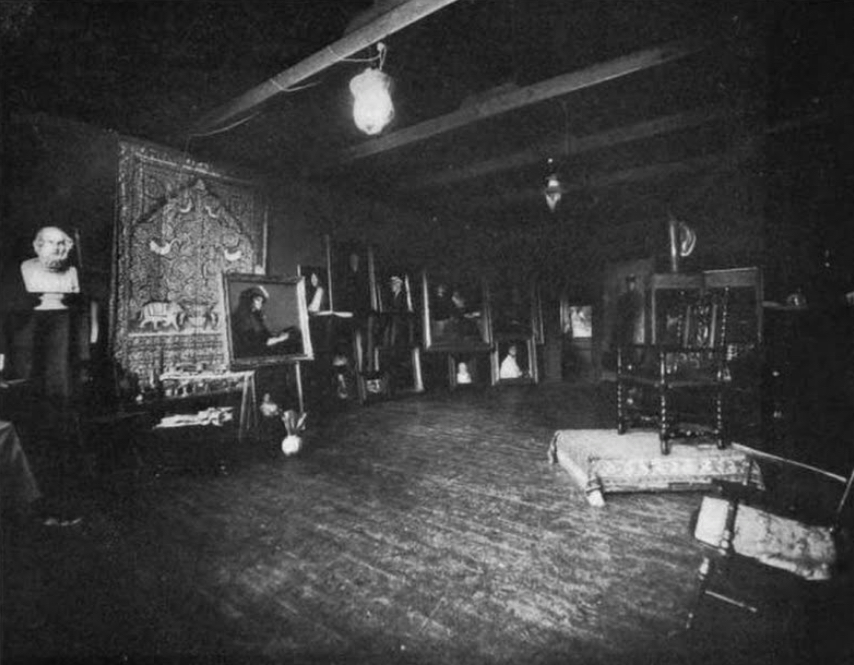
Painter Harriet Blackstone's studio ca. 1918

Harriet Blackstone (November 13, 1864 – March 16, 1939) was an American figure and portrait painter. Many of her subjects were midwestern business leaders and their families she also painted a number of prominent musicians.

== Early life and education ==
Harriet Blackstone was born in 1864 in New Hartford, New York. She had a brother, Edward Charles. She was a descendant of the early New England settler William Blaxton and the Puritan leader Roger Williams. Her family moved to the Midwest in 1883. Early in her adult life she worked as a book editor, publishing The Best American Orations of Today (1903) and teaching drama and elocution at Galesburg High School in Illinois.

Blackstone moved to New York in 1903 to study art at the Pratt Institute, where one of her teachers was William Merritt Chase. Afterwards she went to Paris to study at the Académie Julian, where she worked with the painter Jean-Paul Laurens and exhibited in the 1907 Paris Salon. A few years later, in 1912, she spent a summer studying with the Chase in Belgium.

== Art career ==
Blackstone spent the early part of her career in Glencoe, Illinois. She designed and built the first bungalow in Glencoe, with a separate painting studio out back.

She spent part of World War I in New Mexico working for the U.S. government, which tasked her with painting Native Americans and their environments. During the war, she also produced range-finder paintings to help train military gunners. In 1920, she moved to New York, where she died in 1939.

Blackstone's portraits were praised for their individuality, directness, and mastery of technique. One art expert commented: "How does she get that flesh color? It is as luminous as life itself." Among those she painted were soprano Amelita Galli-Curci, singer Nadezhda Plevitskaya, architect D. Everett Waid, pianist Stell Andersen, Mrs. Frederick D. Underwood, Mrs. Andrew MacLeish, Mrs. John G. McCullough, and numerous midwestern businessmen and their wives and children.

She was a member of several artists' organizations, including the National Arts Club, Chicago Society of Artists, Arts Club of Chicago, American Women's Art Association, and International Society of Arts & Letters.

Her work is held by the De Young Memorial Museum (San Francisco), the National Gallery of Art (Washington, D.C.), the Brooklyn Museum (New York), the Milwaukee Art Museum (Wisconsin), and other institutions. Her papers (1870-1984) are held by the Archives of American Art of the Smithsonian Institution and include business documents, sketchbooks, artwork, photographs, correspondence, and an unpublished biography by writer Esther Morgan McCullough.

== Selected exhibitions ==
- Paris Salon (1907)
- AIC Annual Exhibition of Oil Paintings & Sculpture by American Artists (1907–1916)
- Carnegie Institute, Pittsburgh (1908–1910)
- Pennsylvania Academy of Fine Arts, Philadelphia (1909, 1912)
- National Academy of Design, New York (1910, 1911)
- Panama-Pacific Exposition, San Francisco (1915)
- AIC Annual Exhibition of Works by Chicago Artists (1915, 1916)
