= Stell Andersen =

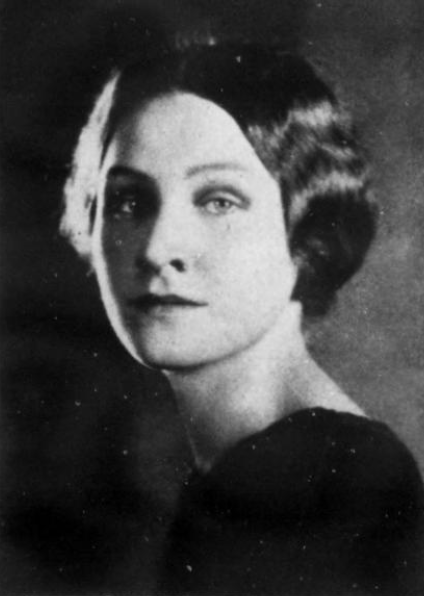
- Born: Cora Stell Andersen; 1897; Linn Grove, Iowa, U.S.
- Died: 1989 (aged 91–92)
- Occupation: Pianist

Cora Stell Andersen (1897–1989), also known as Cora Andersen, was an international concert pianist who toured during the 1920s with Silvio Scionti performing piano duos. In the 1930s and 1940s, she toured as a solo pianist and was the only American soloist invited to perform at the 1937 Paris Exposition.

== Early life and education ==
Cora Stell Andersen was born in Linn Grove, Iowa, and was of Norwegian descent. She was known as Cora Andersen until 1918, when she began using her middle name instead.

She began to study the piano early and eventually went to Chicago to study with Silvio Scionti at the American Conservatory of Music in Chicago. After graduating in 1916, she went to New York for further study with Josef Lhévinne and Isidor Philipp.

== Musical career ==
Shortly thereafter, Andersen went on a concert tour with Scionti playing music for two pianos. Praised by critics for their imaginative and polished playing, they continued to tour together through the 1920s. Though they then stopped playing together regularly, they made occasional appearances together into the early 1950s.

In 1922, Andersen made her solo debut in New York at Carnegie Hall. She toured the United States and Europe throughout the 1930s and 1940s, playing in France, the Netherlands, the United Kingdom, Sweden, Denmark, Switzerland, Poland, Czechoslovakia, Hungary, and Belgium. In 1937, she was the only American soloist who was invited to perform at the Paris Exposition. She went on to perform for the Duke and Duchess of Windsor.

In 1939, she became the first musician invited to perform on a newly installed piano in the East Room of the White House.

Andersen's repertoire was mostly classical and Romantic, including such composers as Mozart, Beethoven, Chopin, Brahms, Schumann, Liszt, Grieg, Scriabin, Rachmaninoff, Saint-Saens, and Ives. In 1939, she premiered composer Darius Milhaud's Fantaisie pastorale for piano and orchestra, Op. 188 with Milhaud conducting. In 1952, she would record this piece and several others with conductor Jonathan Sternberg. Some were released immediately on a disc by Oceanic, while others were not released for another 30 years.

Andersen was known for bringing dignity and flawless execution to her playing, but some critics found her style lacking in excitement and her tempi too free.

She continued touring into the 1960s and died in 1989.

== Personal life ==
Andersen's companion for many years was the author Esther Morgan McCullough, daughter of former Vermont governor John G. McCullough.

In 1936, Andersen saw an exhibition of paintings by Harriet Blackstone at the Dudensing Gallery in New York and commissioned Blackstone to paint her portrait.
