= Eugenics Survey of Vermont =

Former Vermont government survey

The Eugenics Survey of Vermont was a survey that gathered biological, familial, and social information of Vermonters in order to further eugenic policies in the state. The survey existed from 1925-1936 and resulted in the sterilization of at least 250 Vermonters, most of them women. Because of incomplete records, it is likely that the actual number of forced sterilizations was higher than this.

== Background ==
On January 19, 1927, Henry Farnham Perkins, a professor of zoology at the University of Vermont, addressed the state legislature and suggested the creation of a record-keeping system for tracking perceived familial deficiencies in the state.

== Impact ==
At least 250 people were forcibly sterilized due to Vermont's policies, which disproportionately impacted marginalized groups. Women, poor people, disabled people, French Canadians, and children bore the brunt of the impact. In addition to forced sterilization, families were separated, often by institutionalizing adults while placing children in foster care.

== Legacy and contrition ==
=== Government of Vermont ===
On March 31, 2021, the Vermont House of Representatives voted unanimously to apologize for the State's involvement in the eugenics movement.

On May 12, 2021, the Vermont Senate unanimously voted to support the House bill apologizing for the legislature's involvement in the eugenics movement.

In 2023, the state legislature authorized the creation of a truth and reconciliation commission.

=== University of Vermont ===
On October 27, 2018, the University of Vermont renamed its library because of Guy W. Bailey's involvement in eugenics in Vermont. On June 21, 2019, President E. Thomas Sullivan apologized for the University's involvement in the eugenics survey.

=== Vermont Library Board ===
On January 9, 2018, the Vermont Library Board voted to recommend renaming of the Dorothy Canfield Fisher Award due to Dorothy Canfield Fisher's possible ties to the eugenics movement. On May 3, 2019, the Vermont Department of Libraries announced that the award would be renamed in 2020. The award was subsequently renamed the Vermont Golden Dome Book Award.
