= Mason S. Stone =

Lieutenant Governor of Vermont

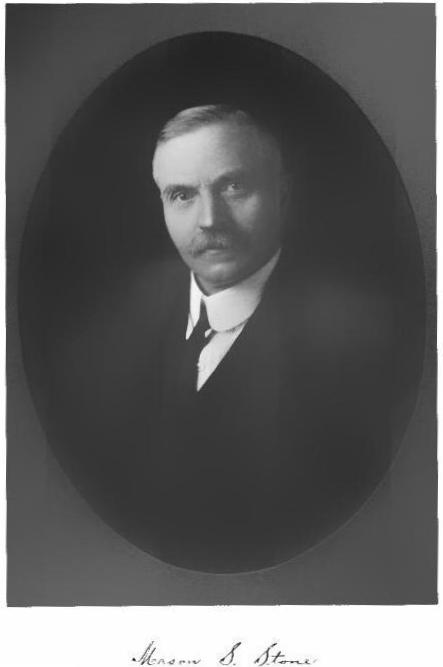

Lieutenant Governor of Vermont
- In office 1919–1921
- Governor: Percival W. Clement
- Preceded by: Roger W. Hulburd
- Succeeded by: Abram W. Foote

Vermont Superintendent of Education
- In office 1905–1916
- Preceded by: Walter Ranger
- Succeeded by: Milo B. Hillegas
- In office 1892–1900
- Preceded by: Edwin F. Palmer
- Succeeded by: Walter Ranger

Personal details
- Born: December 14, 1857 Waterbury Center, Vermont, US
- Died: July 13, 1940 (aged 82) Montpelier, Vermont, US
- Resting place: Green Mount Cemetery, Montpelier, Vermont
- Political party: Republican
- Spouse: Alma G. Wright (m. 1904)
- Education: University of Vermont (AB, AM)
- Profession: Educator

Mason Sereno Stone (December 14, 1857 – July 13, 1940) was a Vermont educator who served as state Superintendent of Education. From 1919 to 1921 he was the 52nd lieutenant governor of Vermont.

== Biography ==
Mason Sereno Stone was born in Waterbury Center, Vermont on December 14, 1857. He worked as a teacher, principal and school superintendent, and received a bachelor's degree in 1883 and a master's degree in 1909, both from the University of Vermont.

He served as Vermont's Superintendent of Education from 1892 to 1900. He also served as a member of the Norwich University Board of Visitors, and received an honorary Doctor of Laws degree from Norwich in 1909.

Stone was Superintendent of Education in Manila, Philippines from 1900 to 1905.

In 1905 he returned to the office of Vermont Education Superintendent, and served until 1916.

Stone won election to the Lieutenant Governor's office as a Republican in 1918 and served one term, 1919 to 1921.

In 1923 Stone was an unsuccessful candidate for the U.S. House of Representatives, losing the Republican primary to Ernest W. Gibson, who went on to win the general election.

Stone died in Montpelier, Vermont on July 13, 1940. He was buried in Montpelier's Green Mount Cemetery.

== Published works ==
Stone also authored several books, including a history of education in Vermont.

- The Geography, History, Constitution and Civil Government of Vermont, by Edward Conant and Mason Sereno Stone, 1915
- History of Education in the State of Vermont, by Mason Sereno Stone, 1930

Party political offices
| Preceded by Roger W. Hulburd | Republican nominee for Lieutenant Governor of Vermont; 1918 | Succeeded by Abram W. Foote |
Political offices
| Preceded by Roger W. Hulburd | Lieutenant Governor of Vermont; 1919–1921 | Succeeded by Abram W. Foote |
