= Abram W. Foote =

Lieutenant Governor of Vermont

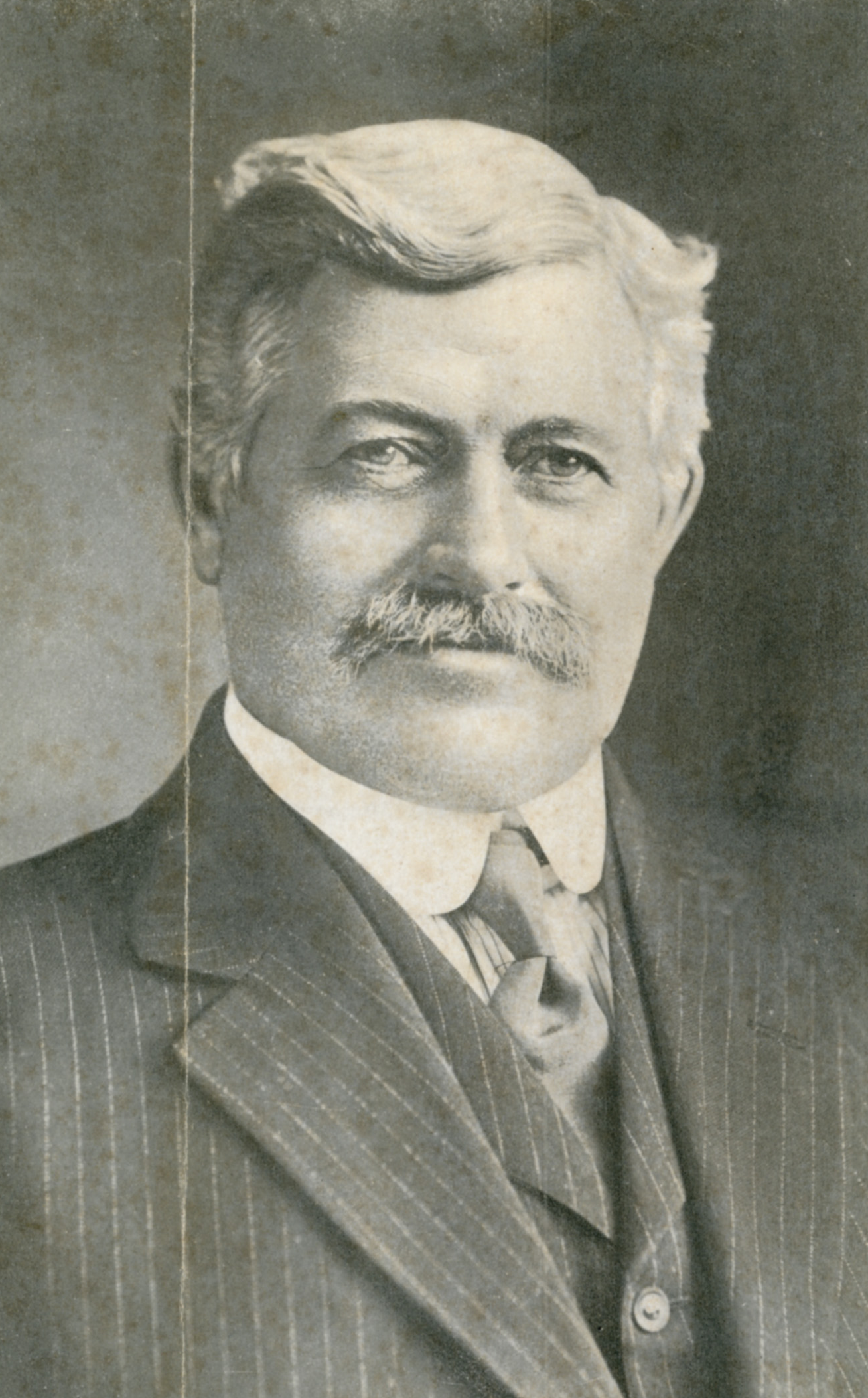

Lieutenant Governor of Vermont
- In office 1921–1923
- Governor: James Hartness
- Preceded by: Mason S. Stone
- Succeeded by: Franklin S. Billings

Member of the Vermont Senate from Addison County
- In office 1917–1919 Serving with Henry E. Day
- Preceded by: Cyrus H. Smith, William Noonan
- Succeeded by: Ira H. LaFleur, Stephen E. Noonan

Member of the Vermont House of Representatives from Cornwall
- In office 1915–1917
- Preceded by: Franklin E. Foote
- Succeeded by: John H. Atwood
- In office 1900–1902
- Preceded by: Lyman W. Peete
- Succeeded by: Charles C. Frost

Assistant Judge of Addison County, Vermont
- In office 1903–1907 Serving with Barney W. Collins (1903), Edward A. Field (1905)
- Preceded by: Bernard M. Collins, Henry D. Branch
- Succeeded by: Edward A. Field, Frank C. Dyer

Personal details
- Born: October 24, 1862 Cornwall, Vermont, U.S.
- Died: May 14, 1941 (aged 78) Middlebury, Vermont, U.S.
- Resting place: Evergreen Cemetery, West Cornwall, Vermont
- Party: Republican
- Spouse: Kate Dodge Nichols (m. 1883)
- Children: 8
- Relatives: Ralph A. Foote (grandson)
- Occupation: Businessman

Abram William Foote (October 24, 1862 – May 14, 1941) was a Vermont businessman and politician. He served as the 53rd lieutenant governor of Vermont from 1921 to 1923.

== Early life ==
Abram William Foote was born in Cornwall, Vermont, on October 24, 1862. He was educated in Middlebury, and went to Middlebury Union High School.

== Business career ==
Foote was a farmer and businessman, with interests in banking, insurance and other companies. He organized the Cornwall Telephone Company and built the first line from Addison County to Burlington, a venture he later sold to New England Telephone. In 1908, he organized the Rutland County Telephone Company, of which he served as General Manager.

== Political career ==
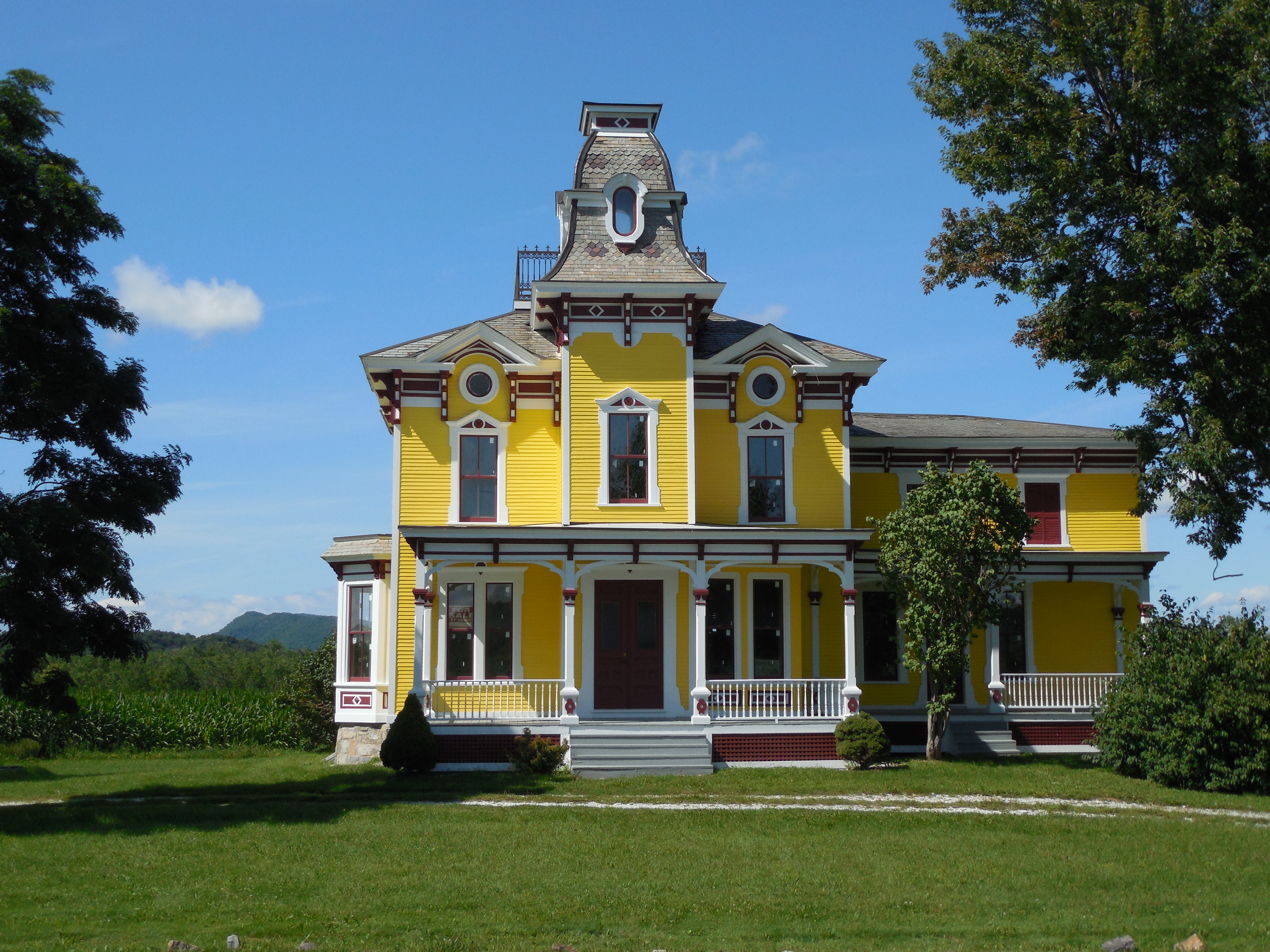
The "Abram Foote Farmhouse" in Cornwall, Vermont built in 1878 for Foote's father Rollin A. Foote. The Foote family bred Spanish Merino sheep on their 300-acre (120 ha) farm.

A Republican, he served in several local offices in Cornwall and was a member of the Vermont House of Representatives from 1900 to 1902. Foote was elected Addison County Assistant Judge in 1902, and reelected in 1904. He again won election to the Vermont House in 1914, serving one term. Foote won election to the Vermont Senate in 1916, serving from 1917 to 1919. In 1920, he was elected Lieutenant Governor and served from 1921 to 1923.

In 1922, Foote ran unsuccessfully for the Republican nomination for governor, losing to Redfield Proctor Jr. Foote served in the Vermont House of Representatives again from 1931 to 1933.

Foote was a delegate to the 1928 Republican National Convention.

== Death and legacy ==
Foote died in Middlebury, Vermont on May 14, 1941, and was buried in West Cornwall's Evergreen Cemetery. He was the grandfather of Ralph A. Foote, who served as Lieutenant Governor from 1961 to 1965.

== Published works ==
- The Foote Family, Comprising The Genealogy and History of Nathaniel Foote Of Weathersfield, Conn. And His Descendants, Marble City Press, The Tuttle Co., Volume 1, 1907

Party political offices
Preceded by Mason S. Stone	Republican nominee for Lieutenant Governor of Vermont; 1920	Succeeded by Franklin S. Billings
Political offices
Preceded by Mason S. Stone	Lieutenant Governor of Vermont; 1921–1923	Succeeded by Franklin S. Billings
