= 1922 United States Senate election in Vermont =

- November 7, 1922
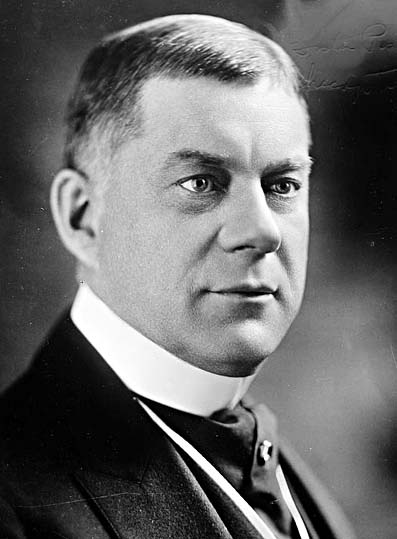

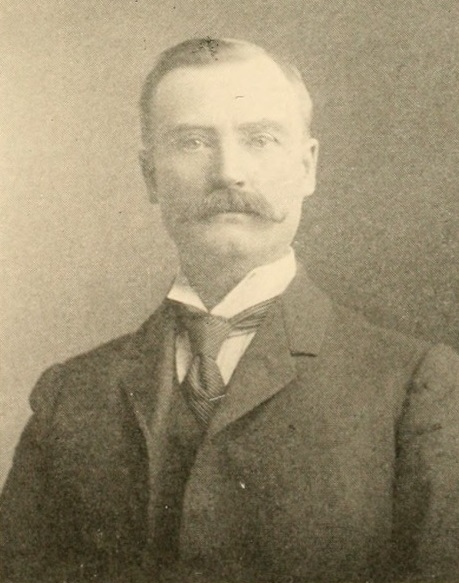
Nominee	Frank L. Greene	William Mayo
Party	Republican	Democratic
Alliance	Prohibition
Popular vote	47,669	21,375
Percentage	69.04%	30.95%
- County results Greene: 50–60% 60–70% 70–80% 80–90% Mayo: 50–60%
U.S. senator before election
Carroll S. Page
Republican
Elected U.S. Senator
Frank L. Greene
Republican

The 1922 United States Senate election in Vermont took place on November 7, 1922. Incumbent Republican Carroll S. Page did not run for re-election to another term in the United States Senate. Republican candidate Frank L. Greene defeated Democratic candidate William B. Mayo to succeed him.

== Republican primary ==
=== Results ===
Republican primary results
Party	Candidate	Votes	%	±%
Republican	Frank L. Greene	41,974	99.7	
Republican	Other	129	0.3	
Total votes		42,103	100.0	

== Democratic primary ==
=== Results ===
Democratic primary results
Party	Candidate	Votes	%	±%
Democratic	William B. Mayo	2,960	99.4	
Democratic	Other	17	0.6	
Total votes		2,977	100.0	

== General election ==
=== Results ===
United States Senate election in Vermont, 1922
Party	Candidate	Votes	%	±%
Republican	Frank L. Greene	45,245	65.53%	−8.88%
Prohibition	Frank L. Greene	2,424	3.51%	N/A
Total	Frank L. Greene	47,669	69.04%	N/A
Democratic	William B. Mayo	21,371	30.95%	+7.45%
Republican	William B. Mayo	4	0.01%	N/A
Total	William B. Mayo	21,375	30.96%	N/A
Total votes		69,044	100.00%	
