= Hale K. Darling =

American attorney and politician

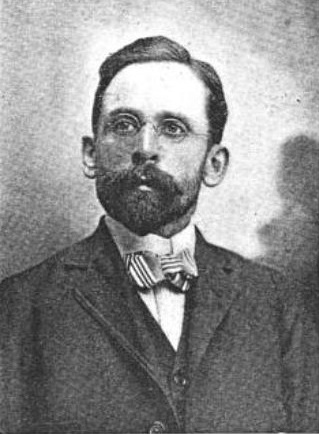

Lieutenant Governor of Vermont
- In office 1915–1917
- Governor: Charles W. Gates
- Preceded by: Frank E. Howe
- Succeeded by: Roger W. Hulburd

Member of the Vermont Senate from Orange County
- In office 1919–1921
- Preceded by: Fred W. Preston
- Succeeded by: John C. Sherburne
- In office 1912–1914
- Preceded by: Lewis M. Seaver, Benjamin B. Scribner
- Succeeded by: David S. Conant

Member of the Vermont House of Representatives from Chelsea
- In office 1904–1908
- Preceded by: Hiram N. Mattison
- Succeeded by: No choice

State's Attorney of Orange County, Vermont
- In office 1896–1900
- Preceded by: Daniel C. Hyde
- Succeeded by: David S. Conant

Personal details
- Born: January 26, 1869 Corinth, Vermont, US
- Died: September 18, 1940 (aged 71) Chelsea, Vermont, US
- Resting place: Highland Cemetery, Chelsea, Vermont
- Party: Republican
- Spouse: Maybelle Maud Hyde (m. 1896)
- Children: 4
- Education: University of North Carolina at Chapel Hill
- Profession: Attorney

Hale Knight Darling (January 26, 1869 – September 18, 1940) was a Vermont attorney and politician who served as the state's 50th lieutenant governor from 1915 to 1917.

== Biography ==
Hale Knight Darling was born in Corinth, Vermont, on January 26, 1869. He was employed in Massachusetts by the Fitchburg Railroad and worked as a reporter on the Fitchburg Daily Sentinel before studying law at the University of North Carolina. He was admitted to the bar in 1894, and established a practice in Chelsea, Vermont.

A Republican, Darling was Orange County State's Attorney from 1896 to 1900, a member of the Vermont Board of Bar Examiners from 1901 to 1903, and Clerk of the Orange County Court from 1905 to 1921.

Darling served in the Vermont House of Representatives from 1904 to 1908. In 1905 he was appointed Chairman of the Vermont Library Commission, and from 1905 to 1907 he was a member of the Commission to revise Vermont's Statutes. He served in the Vermont Senate from 1912 to 1914.

In 1914 he was elected Lieutenant Governor and served from 1915 to 1917, also serving again as a member of the Commission to Revise Vermont's Statutes.

Darling served in the Vermont Senate again from 1919 to 1921. In 1937 he was Chairman of a commission that reviewed and recommended reforms of Vermont's court system.

Darling died in Chelsea on September 18, 1940. He was buried in Chelsea's Highland Cemetery.

== Family ==
In 1896, Darling married Maybelle Maud Hyde; they were the parents of four children who lived to adulthood.

Party political offices
Preceded by Frank E. Howe	Republican nominee for Lieutenant Governor of Vermont; 1914	Succeeded by Roger W. Hulburd
Political offices
Preceded by Frank E. Howe	Lieutenant Governor of Vermont; 1915–1917	Succeeded by Roger W. Hulburd
