= Horace F. Graham =

American politician (1862–1941)

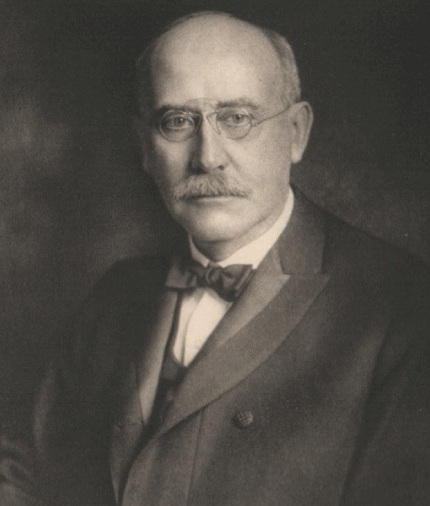
- Governor Horace Graham. Photo by A.W. Elson & Company, Belmont, Massachusetts.

56th Governor of Vermont
- In office January 4, 1917 – January 9, 1919
- Lieutenant: Roger W. Hulburd
- Preceded by: Charles W. Gates
- Succeeded by: Percival W. Clement

Vermont State Auditor
- In office 1902–1917
- Governor: John G. McCullough; Charles J. Bell; Fletcher D. Proctor; George H. Prouty; John A. Mead; Allen M. Fletcher; Charles W. Gates
- Preceded by: Orion M. Barber
- Succeeded by: Benjamin Gates

State's Attorney of Orleans County, Vermont
- In office 1898–1902
- Preceded by: Orien S. Annis
- Succeeded by: Albert W. Farman

Member of the Vermont House of Representatives from Craftsbury
- In office 1923–1925
- Preceded by: William C. Hadley
- Succeeded by: Mary Jean Simpson
- In office 1900–1902
- Preceded by: Portus W. Davison
- Succeeded by: James A. Gallagher
- In office 1892–1894
- Preceded by: Charles W. Dustin
- Succeeded by: Augustus Paddock

Personal details
- Born: February 7, 1862 Brooklyn, New York, US
- Died: November 23, 1941 (aged 79) Craftsbury, Vermont, US
- Resting place: Craftsbury Common Cemetery, Craftsbury, Vermont
- Party: Republican
- Education: College of the City of New York; Columbia Law School
- Profession: Attorney

Horace French Graham (February 7, 1862 – November 23, 1941) was an American politician who served as the 56th governor of Vermont from 1917 to 1919.

== Early life ==
Graham was born in Brooklyn, New York, the son of Samuel Hallett Graham and Lucy Fairbanks (Swett) Graham. He received his early education in Craftsbury, Vermont, and was a graduate of Craftsbury Academy. He graduated from the College of the City of New York (now New York University) in 1882. He received his law degree from Columbia Law School in 1888 and became an attorney in Craftsbury.

Graham was a member of the Phi Gamma Delta fraternity.

== Early political career ==
A Republican, he served as Craftsbury's Town Meeting Moderator from 1902 to 1932, and in the Vermont House of Representatives in 1892 and 1900. He was Orleans County State's Attorney from 1898 to 1902, and a Republican Presidential elector in 1900.

Graham was Vermont's Auditor from 1902 to 1916, and a member of the state Education Commission in 1913.

== Election as Governor ==
In 1916 Graham was the successful candidate for the Republican nomination for Governor. In a state where only Republicans won statewide office from the 1850s to the 1960s, he easily won the general election. He served from 1917 to 1919, the one term then available to Vermont Republicans under the "Mountain Rule."

Graham's governorship was notable for his advocacy of women's suffrage in local elections, and for his efforts to mobilize the Vermont National Guard and other state resources for World War I.

== Charges of embezzlement ==
While Graham was governor, an investigation revealed that a large sum of state money (nearly $25,000, or $450,000 in 2019) was unaccounted for during his term as Auditor. Graham repaid the missing funds, but was charged with embezzlement and convicted at trial. He was then pardoned by the new Governor, Percival Clement, who lauded Graham's integrity (his nickname was "Honest Horace") and efforts as Governor during World War I. Graham always maintained his innocence, but stated that since the loss took place while he was Auditor, he felt personally obligated to reimburse the state for the missing money.

== Post gubernatorial career ==
His reputation for integrity was largely undamaged, and he served in the Vermont House again from 1923 to 1925, and also took part in revising Vermont's Statutes in 1933.

== Death and burial ==
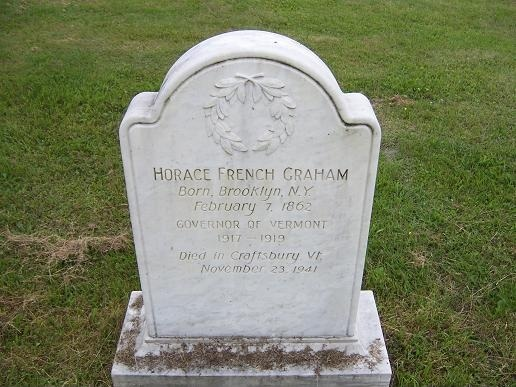
Graham's gravestone in Craftsbury's Craftsbury Common Cemetery

Graham died in Craftsbury on November 23, 1941. He was buried at Craftsbury Common Cemetery.

== Personal ==
Graham was a lifelong bachelor and lived with his sister Isabel.

== External resources ==
- Horace French Graham biography, National Governors Association, accessed November 19, 2011

=== VT Digger ===
- Heintz, Ben (November 21, 2018). "The Trials of Honest Horace, Part I: Vermont's forgotten governor". VT Digger. Montpelier, VT.
- Heintz, Ben (November 23, 2018). "The Trials of Honest Horace, Part II: His rise, his rival and his fall". VT Digger. Montpelier, VT.
- Heintz, Ben (November 25, 2018). "The Trials of Honest Horace, Part III: His reckoning". VT Digger. Montpelier, VT.
- Heintz, Ben (February 3, 2020). "Vermont's forgotten impeachment". VT Digger. Montpelier, VT.

Party political offices
| Preceded by Orion M. Barber | Republican nominee for Vermont State Auditor; 1902, 1904, 1904, 1906, 1908, 1910, 1912, 1914 | Succeeded by Benjamin Gates |
| Preceded by Charles W. Gates | Republican nominee for Governor of Vermont; 1916 | Succeeded by Percival W. Clement |
Political offices
| Preceded by Orion M. Barber | Vermont Auditor of Accounts; 1902-1917 | Succeeded by Benjamin Gates |
| Preceded by Charles W. Gates | Governor of Vermont; 1917–1919 | Succeeded by Percival W. Clement |
