= Range-finder painting =

Landscape painting used to train gunners

A range-finder painting, sometimes called range-finding painting, is a large landscape painting produced as a training device to help gunners improve their accuracy. Historically, the best-documented use of such paintings was in the United States during World War I.

== History ==
During World War I, some military gunnery training was carried out indoors. While it is relatively simple to train gunners in range-finding (that is, estimating the correct distance for their shots) outdoors, it is difficult to train them in long-range gunnery indoors. To solve this problem, the British and U.S. militaries tested the use of large landscape paintings showing distant sites for range-finding and target-sighting in indoor gun ranges. These so-called range-finder paintings proved so successful that a program was organized in the United States to produce them in larger numbers. They were also used to teach soldiers how to draw military maps in the field and how to identify points of military importance such as zones of good cover.

In 1918, the Salmagundi Club in New York spearheaded the effort to produce range-finder paintings for the U.S. military, providing canvas and painting materials. The program resulted in dozens of landscape paintings of various French and Belgian sites that were roughly 50 by 70 inches (1.3 m × 1.8 m). Most showed towns and villages in the near or middle distance, along with other militarily important features such as roads, bridges, canals, fields, forests, and hills.

The painter Ernest L. Blumenschein helped to draft and organize artists across the United States for this effort, especially in his home town of Taos, New Mexico, and nearby Santa Fe. In Taos alone, 15 such range-finder paintings of landscapes in France were produced in 1918. Some of these were sent to Camp Cody in southern New Mexico and to Camp Funston in Kansas.

Artists who participated besides Blumenschein included Gustave Baumann, O.E. Berninghaus, Harriet Blackstone, Paul Burlin, Ethel Coe, E. Irving Couse, W. Herbert Dunton, Leon Gaspard, Burt Harwood, Lee Hersch, J.T. Hunter, Sheldon Parsons, Bert Geer Phillips, J.H. Sharp, Walter Ufer, Cordelia Wilson, and Jay Young-Hunter.

== See also ==
- List of established military terms
