= Mayo Building (Northfield, Vermont) =

- U.S. National Register of Historic Places
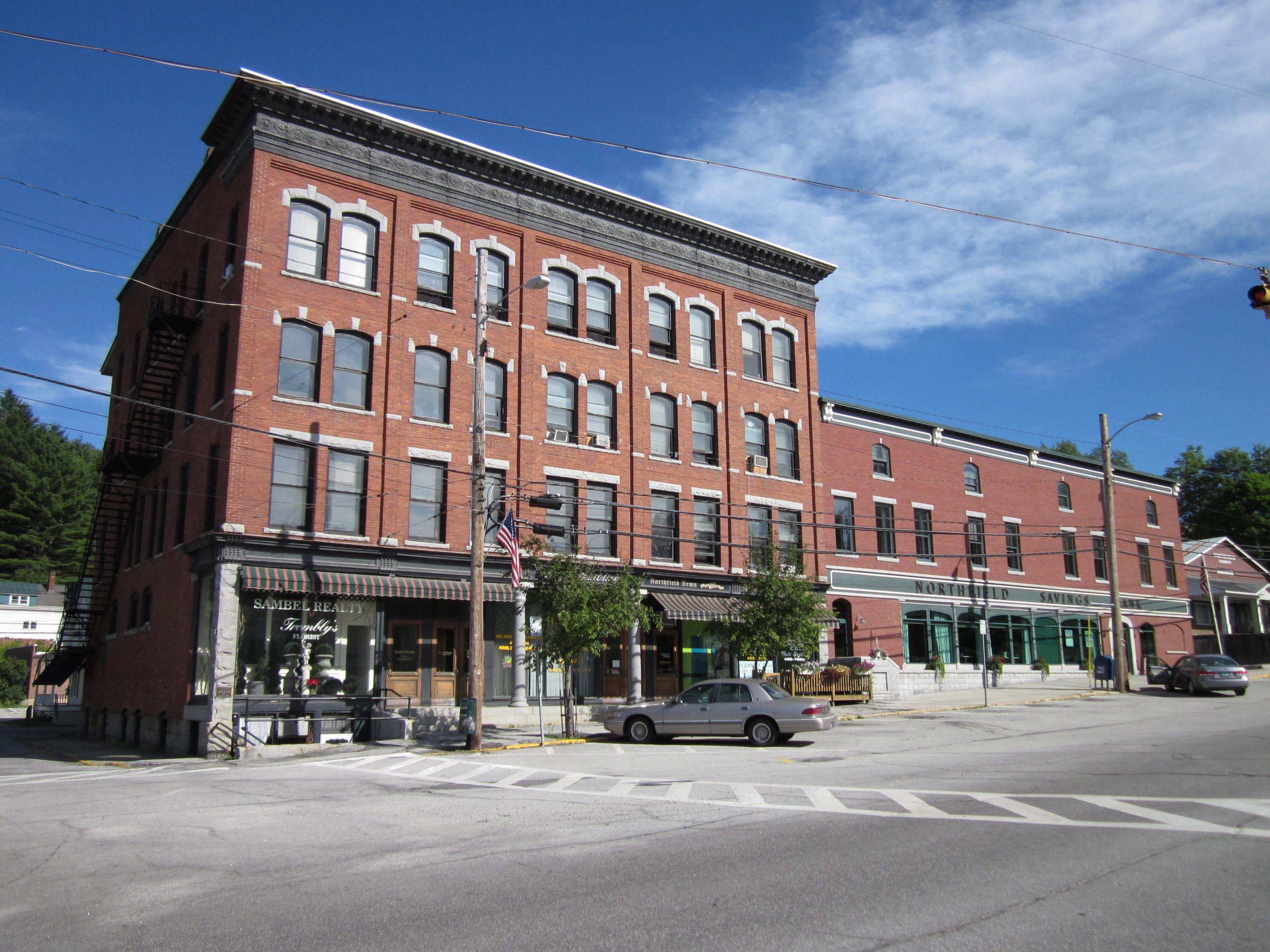

- Location within Vermont Location within the United States
- Location: Main & East Sts., Northfield, Vermont
- Coordinates: 44°8′54″N 72°39′22″W
- Area: 0.1 acres (0.040 ha)
- Built: 1902
- Architect: Lane & Son
- NRHP reference No.: 83003222
- Added to NRHP: July 14, 1983

The Mayo Building is a historic commercial building at Main and East Streets in downtown Northfield, Vermont. Built in 1902, it is a prominent and imposing example of Classical Revival architecture. It was listed on the National Register of Historic Places in 1983.

== Description and history ==
The Mayo Building is prominently located in Northfield's central Depot Square area, facing that square from across South Main Street (Vermont Route 12). It is a four-story masonry structure, with a flat roof, exterior of brick with granite trim, and is the commercial district's tallest building. Its ground floor is divided into two store fronts with a central building entrance. The storefronts are framed by square granite posts at the outer building corners, and by round granite columns that separate them from the main entrance, with recessed store entrances flanked by glass display windows. Second story windows are set in rectangular openings with granite sills and lintels, while third floor windows are in segmented-arch openings with granite keystones and sills. Fourth story windows are also set in segmented-arch openings, but are topped by keystoned granite caps. The facade is capped by a broad cornice and decorative stamped metal entablature.

The block was built in 1902 for Dr. William B. Mayo, a prominent local politician and businessman. It was designed by Lane & Son of Burlington. It was designed to house the post office and town offices on the ground floor, professional offices on the second floor, apartments on the third, and a Masonic lodge meeting hall on the fourth. It was one of a series of real estate developments by Dr. Mayo, who served the community as a physician for 50 years.

== See also ==
- National Register of Historic Places listings in Washington County, Vermont
