= Elbert S. Brigham =

American politician (1877–1962)

Elbert Sidney Brigham
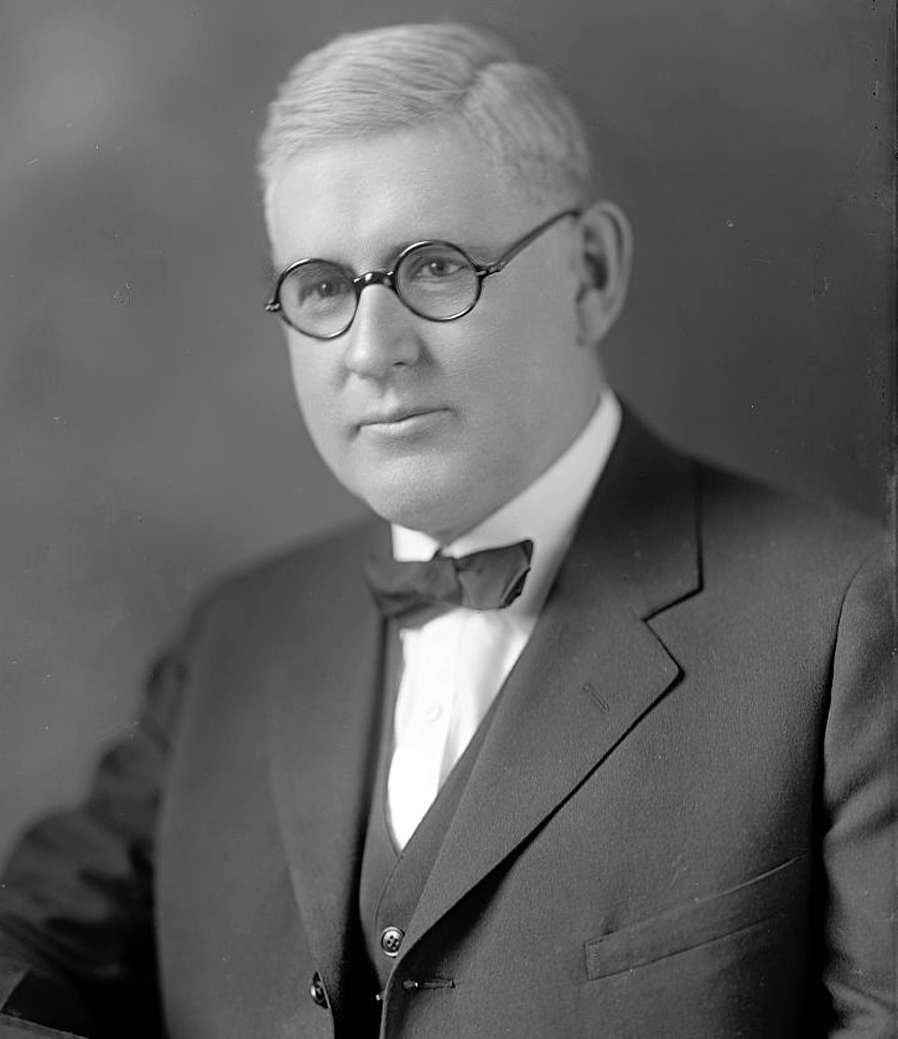

Member of the U.S. House of Representatives from Vermont's 1st district
- In office March 4, 1925 – March 3, 1931
- Preceded by: Frederick G. Fleetwood
- Succeeded by: John E. Weeks

Personal details
- Born: October 19, 1877 St. Albans, Vermont, US
- Died: July 5, 1962 (aged 84) St. Albans, Vermont, US
- Party: Republican
- Spouse: Anna S. Hazen Brigham
- Education: Middlebury College
- Profession: Banker, politician

Elbert Sidney Brigham (October 19, 1877 – July 5, 1962) was a U.S. representative from Vermont.

== Biography ==
Brigham was born in St. Albans, Franklin County, Vermont, son of Sanford J. Brigham and Sarah J. (Bronson) Brigham, and was a descendant of Thomas Brigham and Edmund Rice, early immigrants to Massachusetts Bay Colony. Brigham graduated from St. Albans High School in 1898 and from Middlebury College in 1903. He married Anna S. Hazen, daughter of Stephen Hazen and Harriet (Congdon) Hazen, on October 2, 1906, in Saint Albans, Vermont.

== Career ==
Brigham was a farmer and dairy cattle breeder throughout his life. He was the first farmer with 100-cow herd to average more than 600 pounds of butterfat in one year.

He was Auditor for the town of St. Albans in 1911 and 1912, and state commissioner of agriculture from 1913 to 1924. He was a member of the National Agricultural Advisory Committee and of the United States Food Administration, Washington, D.C., in 1918. As well as being a Trustee of Middlebury College 1922-1960, he served as director on the National Life Insurance Company in 1925. Brigham was elected as a Republican to the Sixty-ninth, Seventieth, and Seventy-first Congresses, and served from March 4, 1925, to March 3, 1931. He was not a candidate for renomination in 1930.

A member of Reconstruction Finance Corporation in 1932, Brigham then served as chairman of Vermont Advisory Banking Board from 1933 to 1936. He was president of National Life Insurance Company, Montpelier, Vermont, from 1937 to 1948, succeeding Fred A. Howland. He was also president of Franklin County Savings Bank and Trust Company, St. Albans, Vermont from 1944 to 1957 and chairman of the board from 1957 to 1962.

== Death ==
Brigham died in St. Albans City, Vermont, on July 5, 1962. He is interred at St. Albans Bay Cemetery, St. Albans Town, Vermont.

U.S. House of Representatives
Preceded by Frederick G. Fleetwood	Member of the U.S. House of Representatives from Vermont's 1st congressional district March 4, 1925 – March 3, 1931	Succeeded by John E. Weeks
