= Thomas C. Cheney =

American politician

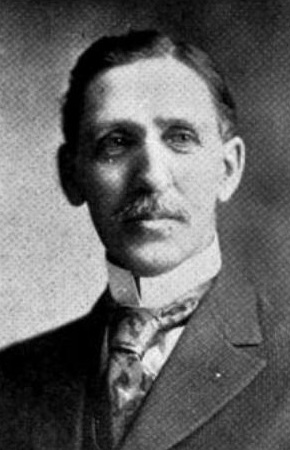

Speaker of the Vermont House of Representatives
- In office 1906–1910
- Preceded by: John H. Merrifield
- Succeeded by: Frank E. Howe

Member of the Vermont House of Representatives
- In office 1906–1910
- Preceded by: Calvin L. Gates
- Succeeded by: George W. Clark
- Constituency: Morristown

State's Attorney of Lamoille County, Vermont
- In office 1900–1902
- Preceded by: Leon J. Thompson
- Succeeded by: Frederick G. Bicknell

Personal details
- Born: October 10, 1868 Morristown, Vermont, U.S.
- Died: October 13, 1957 (aged 89) Morrisville, Vermont, U.S.
- Resting place: Pleasant View Cemetery, Morrisville, Vermont, U.S.
- Party: Republican
- Spouse: May Lily Terrill (m. 1896)
- Education: University of Vermont
- Profession: Attorney

Thomas C. Cheney (October 10, 1868 – October 13, 1957) was a Vermont politician and attorney who served as Speaker of the Vermont House of Representatives.

== Biography ==
Thomas Charles Cheney was born in Morristown, Vermont, on October 10, 1868. He graduated from the University of Vermont in 1891, studied law and became an attorney in Morrisville, Vermont. Cheney served in several local offices including school board member, and was Morristown's Town Meeting Moderator for more than 25 years.

Cheney also became active in the insurance business, and was president of the Vermont Insurance Federation and a director of the Vermont Mutual Fire Insurance Company.

A Republican, in 1892 Cheney worked in the office of the Vermont Secretary of State. He was an assistant clerk of the Vermont House of Representatives from 1894 to 1898, and clerk from 1898 to 1906.

From 1900 to 1902, Cheney was Lamoille County State's Attorney.

In 1906 and 1908, Cheney was elected as a member of the Vermont House, serving from 1906 to 1910. He was Speaker for the entire length of his house service.

After leaving office, Cheney returned to his legal and insurance interests. He died in Morrisville on October 13, 1957, and was buried in the Pleasant View Cemetery there.

Political offices
Preceded by John H. Merrifield	Speaker of the Vermont House of Representatives; 1906 – 1910	Succeeded by Frank E. Howe
Preceded by Fred A. Howland	Clerk of the Vermont House of Representatives; 1898–1906	Succeeded by Fred L. Hamilton
