= 1916 Vermont gubernatorial election =

- November 7, 1916
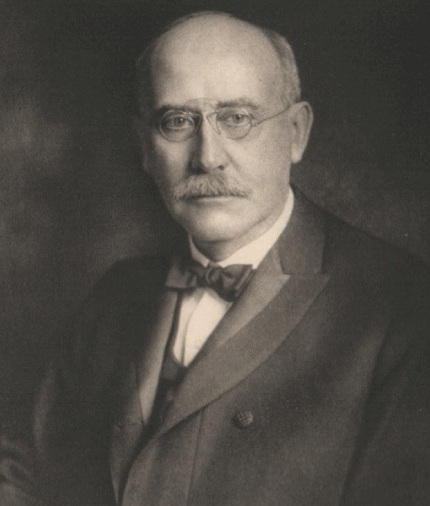

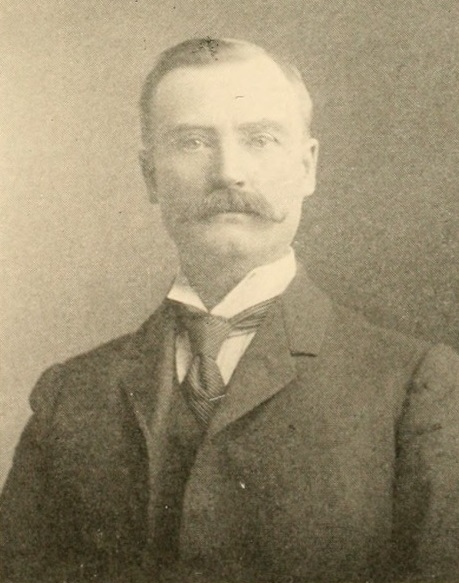
Nominee	Horace F. Graham	William B. Mayo
Party	Republican	Democratic
Popular vote	43,265	15,789
Percentage	71.10%	25.94%
- Graham: 40–50% 50–60% 60–70% 70–80% 80–90% 90-100% Mayo: 40–50% 50–60% 60–70% Tie: 50% No Vote/Data
Governor before election
Charles W. Gates
Republican
Elected Governor
Horace F. Graham
Republican

The 1916 Vermont gubernatorial election took place on November 7, 1916. Incumbent Republican Charles W. Gates, per the "Mountain Rule", did not run for re-election to a second term as Governor of Vermont. Republican candidate Horace F. Graham defeated Democratic candidate William B. Mayo to succeed him.

== Republican primary ==
=== Results ===
Republican primary results
Party	Candidate	Votes	%	±%
Republican	Horace F. Graham	33,244	99.9	
Republican	Other	37	0.1	
Total votes		33,281	100.0	

== Democratic primary ==
=== Results ===
Democratic primary results
Party	Candidate	Votes	%	±%
Democratic	William B. Mayo	3,562	99.9	
Democratic	Other	1	0.0	
Total votes		3,563	100.0	

== General election ==
=== Results ===
1916 Vermont gubernatorial election
Party	Candidate	Votes	%	±%
Republican	Horace F. Graham	43,265	71.10	
Democratic	William B. Mayo	15,789	25.94	
Socialist	W. R. Rowland	920	1.51	
Prohibition	Lester W. Hanson	876	1.44	
N/A	Other	4	0.01	
Total votes		60,854	100.0	
