= Guy W. Bailey =

American politician (1876–1940)

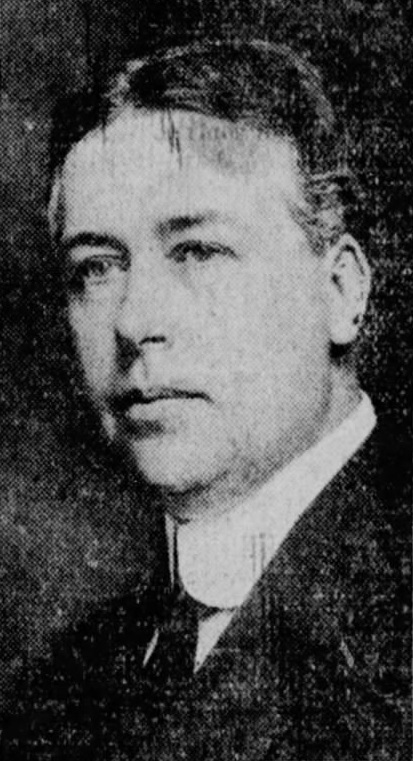

Secretary of State of Vermont
- In office 1908–1917
- Governor: George H. Prouty; John A. Mead; Allen M. Fletcher
- Preceded by: Frederick G. Fleetwood
- Succeeded by: Frederick G. Fleetwood

Member of the Vermont House of Representatives from Essex
- In office 1904–1908
- Preceded by: Pearl Castle Abbey
- Succeeded by: Allen Martin

Personal details
- Born: May 27, 1876 Hardwick, Vermont, US
- Died: October 22, 1940 (aged 64) Boston, Massachusetts, U.S.
- Resting place: Village Cemetery, Essex Junction, Vermont
- Party: Republican
- Spouse: Mabel G. Brigham (m. 1904)
- Children: 1
- Education: University of Vermont
- Profession: Lawyer politician college administrator

Guy Winfred Bailey (May 7, 1876 – October 22, 1940) was an American politician and educator. He served as Secretary of State of Vermont and president of the University of Vermont.

== Biography ==
Guy Winfred Bailey was born in Hardwick, Vermont, on May 7, 1876. He was raised and educated in Essex Junction, where his father owned and operated the Bailey Granite Monument Company.

Bailey graduated from Burlington High School in 1896, and the University of Vermont in 1900. While at UVM, Bailey joined the Alpha Tau Omega fraternity. He studied law at the Burlington office of Rufus E. Brown & Russell W. Taft, and was admitted to the bar in 1904. A Republican, he served as village president of Essex Junction from 1901 to 1904, and a member of the Vermont House of Representatives in 1904 and 1906.

In 1908, Bailey was elected secretary of state. He was reelected four times, and served from October 1908 until resigning in August 1917. From 1912 to 1914, he served again as Essex Junction's village president. Bailey had been a trustee of the University of Vermont since 1914, and left the secretary of state's position to become UVM's comptroller. In August 1919, Bailey was appointed acting president of the university. In June 1920 he became president, and he held this position until his death.

The study of eugenics flourished in Vermont during the first half of the twentieth century, and the Eugenics Survey of Vermont became the first privately funded research project at UVM. Bailey served on the Survey's Advisory Committee, and aided the effort by negotiating for and administering the sponsors' funding.

During Bailey's presidency, the university undertook a large expansion and modernization program, including construction of several new buildings. He also worked to reduce expenses during the Great Depression, in addition to seeking scholarships and loans for students who needed them in order to remain in school during the economic downturn. After Bailey's death, university administrators discovered that the school had been operating with an annual budget deficit of more than $500,000, and he had used endowment funds to cover current expenses; as a result, his management of UVM's finances became the subject of negative press attention.

== Death and burial ==
Bailey died in Boston, Massachusetts on October 22, 1940. He was buried at Essex Junction Village Cemetery.

== Family ==
On December 22, 1904, Bailey married Mabel G. Brigham of Essex Junction. They were the parents of a son, Winthrop, who was born and died in 1905.

== Legacy ==
Bailey received the honorary degree of LL.D. from the University of Vermont, Middlebury College, and Norwich University.

In the years after the Great Depression, UVM alumni sought to rehabilitate Bailey's reputation, which included the publication of a tribute book, Thank You, Guy Bailey. When the university trustees voted to construct a new library in 1961, they named it in Bailey's honor. This facility was expanded in 1980 and was known as the Bailey/Howe Library; David Howe was a 1914 graduate of UVM, and the longtime publisher of The Burlington Free Press.

== Historical view ==
In February 2018 students and staff members protesting racism at the University of Vermont demanded that President Thomas Sullivan change the name of the Bailey/Howe Library because of Bailey's connection to eugenics. The University formed a study committee, which recommended dropping Bailey's name. The university's leadership agreed, and in October 2018, it was renamed the David W. Howe Memorial Library.

== Sources ==
=== Internet ===
- "Biography, Guy W. Bailey (1920–1940)". Former presidents. Burlington, VT: University of Vermont. Archived from the original on September 14, 2017.
- The Eugenics Survey of Vermont: Participants & Partners (March 1, 2001). "Biography, Guy W. Bailey (1876–1940)". Vermont Eugenics: A Documentary History. Burlington, VT: University of Vermont.
- Marshall, Lindsay (2007). "Bailey-Howe Library". UVM Historic Preservation Program. Burlington, VT: University of Vermont.
- Martin, Allen, Essex (VT) Town Clerk (December 13, 1905). "Vermont Vital Records, 1720–1908, Death Record for Winthrop Bailey". Ancestry.com. Lehi, UT: Ancestry.com LLC.

=== Newspapers ===
- "The University's New President". Burlington Free Press. Burlington, VT. June 28, 1920. p. 9.
- "Guy W. Bailey, Head of U. of Vermont, Dies". Poughkeepsie Eagle-News. Poughkeepsie, NY. Associated Press. October 23, 1940. p. 1.
- "Some 800 Persons at Funeral for President Bailey". Burlington Free Press. Burlington, VT. October 26, 1940. p. 13.
- DeSmet, Nicole Higgins; Baird, Joel Banner (February 26, 2018). "UVM hunger striker ends campaign as students stage sit-in, confront Sullivan". Burlington Free Press. Burlington, VT.
- Walsh, Molly (October 26, 2018). "'Howe' Now: UVM Drops 'Bailey' From Library Name Over Eugenics Ties". Seven Days. Burlington, VT.

=== Magazines ===
- "Alumni Day: Election of Guy W. Bailey". University of Vermont Notes. Vol. 14–16. Burlington, VT: University of Vermont Notes. 1917. p. 6. "Mr. Bailey was president of the village of Essex Junction from 1901 to 1904, and from 1912 to 1914"
- "In Memoriam, Guy W. Bailey". The Palm of Alpha Tau Omega. Vol. 60, no. 5. Indianapolis, IN: High Council of Alpha Tau Omega. 1940. p. 27.

Party political offices
Preceded by Frederick G. Fleetwood	Republican nominee for Secretary of State of Vermont; 1908, 1910, 1912, 1914, 1916	Succeeded by Harry A. Black
Academic offices
Preceded by Guy Potter Benton	President of the University of Vermont; 1919–1940	Succeeded by John S. Millis
Political offices
Preceded by Frederick G. Fleetwood	Vermont Secretary of State; 1908–1917	Succeeded by Frederick G. Fleetwood
