= John H. Merrifield =

American politician

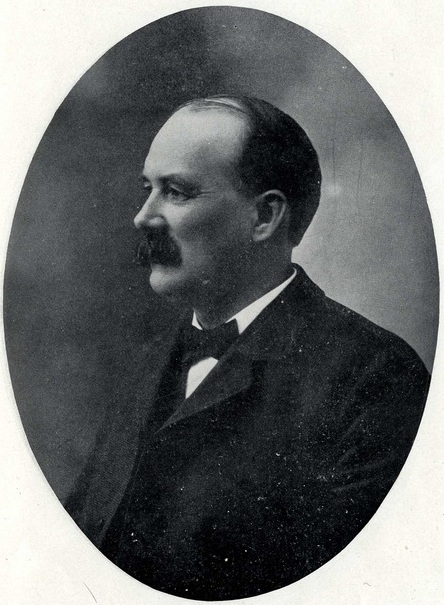
- From the November 1902 issue of The Vermonter magazine

Speaker of the Vermont House of Representatives
- In office 1902–1906
- Preceded by: Fletcher D. Proctor
- Succeeded by: Thomas C. Cheney

Member of the Vermont House of Representatives from Newfane
- In office 1902–1906
- Preceded by: George B. Williams
- Succeeded by: Darwin A. Benson
- In office 1896–1897
- Preceded by: Eugene S. Weston
- Succeeded by: William R. Rand
- In office 1878–1882
- Preceded by: Alvin B. Franklin
- Succeeded by: Marshall O. Howe

Personal details
- Born: June 12, 1847 Newfane, Vermont, U.S.
- Died: December 29, 1906 (aged 59) Brattleboro, Vermont, U.S.
- Resting place: Williamsville Cemetery, Williamsville, Vermont, U.S.
- Party: Republican
- Spouse: Ella R. Stratton (m. 1886)
- Children: 1
- Occupation: Retail clerk Railroad station agent County clerk

John H. Merrifield (June 12, 1847 – December 29, 1906) was a Vermont politician who served as Speaker of the Vermont House of Representatives. Merrifield was a Republican.

== Biography ==
John Hastings Merrifield was born in Newfane, Vermont on June 12, 1847. He was educated at the common schools of Newfane and Springfield Wesleyan Seminary and became a farmer.

He also operated a general merchandise store for several years, and later worked as Station Agent for the Vermont line of the B & W Railroad.

Merrifield was associated with the Vermont House of Representatives for over 30 years, serving as engrossing clerk (1874–78), a member (1878–82, 1896), second assistant clerk (1882–88), first assistant clerk (1890), and clerk (1892–96). Merrifield served again as a member from 1902 to 1906 and was Speaker of the House.

He also held several town offices and was appointed county clerk for Windham County in 1897, serving until his death in Brattleboro on December 29, 1906. He was buried at Williamsville Cemetery in Williamsville.

Political offices
Preceded by Fletcher D. Proctor	Speaker of the Vermont House of Representatives; 1902–1906	Succeeded by Thomas C. Cheney
Preceded by William W. Stickney	Clerk of the Vermont House of Representatives; 1892–1896	Succeeded by Fred A. Howland
