= Esther Morgan McCullough =

American novelist (1888–1957)

Esther Morgan McCullough (1888 – June 14, 1957) was an American novelist and anthologist.

== Biography ==
Esther Morgan Park McCullough was born in North Bennington, Vermont, to Eliza Hall (Park) McCullough and John G. McCullough, an attorney and future governor of Vermont. She and her siblings Hall, Eliza, and Ella were raised in their mother's family mansion, now known as the Park-McCullough Historic House.

McCullough wrote novels such as Archangel House (1935) and The Five Devils of Kilmainham (1955). The latter, which was about the effect of murder on families living on the fringes of Dublin in the 1880s, was praised by critics as a masterpiece of suspense. Her largest project was As I Pass, O Manhattan (1956), a 1200-page anthology of writing about life in New York from its earliest days that encompassed some 200 authors and ranged from poetry to biography. Hailed as a "magnificent tribute to a mighty city", this compendium of "literary New Yorkiana" is still being used by other writers.

Her unpublished biography of painter Harriet Blackstone is among the Harriet Blackstone Papers in the Smithsonian Institution.

McCullough was also a musician and served for a time as director of the Vermont Symphony Orchestra.

== Personal life ==
Her longtime companion was the pianist Stell Andersen.

== Publications ==
- —And Forever (1935)
- Archangel House (1939)
- The Five Devils of Kilmainham (1955)
- As I Pass, O Manhattan: An Anthology of Life in New York (1956)
