= Roger W. Hulburd =

American politician

Roger Hulburd
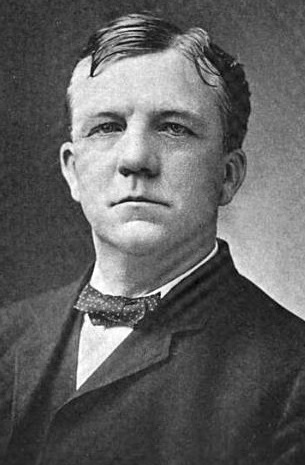

51st Lieutenant Governor of Vermont
- In office 1917–1919
- Governor: Horace F. Graham
- Preceded by: Hale K. Darling
- Succeeded by: Mason S. Stone

Member of the Vermont House of Representatives from Hyde Park
- In office 1906–1908
- Preceded by: Smith B. Waite
- Succeeded by: Elbridge G. Sherwin

Member of the Vermont Senate from Lamoille County
- In office 1896–1898
- Preceded by: Frank Kenfield
- Succeeded by: Charles H. Stearns

Personal details
- Born: October 22, 1856 Waterville, Vermont, U.S.
- Died: November 20, 1944 (aged 88) Hyde Park, Vermont, U.S.
- Party: Republican
- Children: Benjamin N. Hulburd
- Education: University of Vermont (BA); Albany Law School (LLB)
- Profession: Attorney

Roger William Hulburd (October 22, 1856 – November 20, 1944) was an American attorney and politician who served as the 51st lieutenant governor of Vermont from 1917 to 1919.

== Early life and education ==
Roger William Hulburd was born in Waterville, Vermont, on October 22, 1856, and was educated at People's Academy in Morrisville. He graduated from the University of Vermont in 1882, and Albany Law School in 1887.

== Career ==
Hulburd taught school and served as principal of Lamoille Central Academy in Hyde Park before attaining admission to the bar in 1887, afterwards becoming an attorney in Hyde Park. He was also active in several businesses, including serving as a Trustee of the Lamoille County Savings Bank and President of the Hyde Park Warehouse Company. In the 1890s he also served as Hyde Park's Postmaster.

A Republican, he served as Lamoille County State's Attorney from 1894 to 1896, and served in the Vermont Senate from 1896 to 1898. From 1896 to 1906 he was Chairman of the Board of Trustees for the Vermont Industrial School.

Hulburd served in the Vermont House of Representatives from 1906 to 1908, and on the Vermont Penal Board from 1906 to 1910. He was a Delegate to the Republican national conventions of 1904 and 1908.

In 1916 he won the Republican nomination for Lieutenant Governor over incumbent John E. Weeks. In an era when only Republicans were elected to statewide office in Vermont, Hulburd easily won the general election and served one term, 1917 to 1919.

Hulburd was active in the Vermont Bar Association and served for several years as Chairman of the state Board of Bar Examiners.

== Personal life ==
Hulburd died in Hyde Park, Vermont on November 20, 1944. His son Benjamin N. Hulburd, was also an attorney who served as Chief Justice of the Vermont Supreme Court.

Party political offices
Preceded by Hale K. Darling	Republican nominee for Lieutenant Governor of Vermont; 1916	Succeeded by Mason S. Stone
Political offices
Preceded by Hale K. Darling	Lieutenant Governor of Vermont; 1917–1919	Succeeded by Mason S. Stone
