= Frank E. Howe =

American newspaper publisher and politician from Vermont

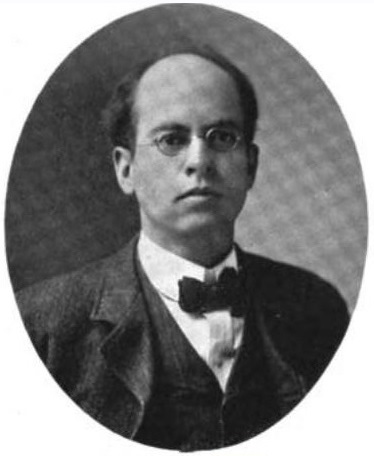
- From the August 1905 edition of The Vermonter magazine

Lieutenant Governor of Vermont
- In office 1912–1915
- Governor: Allen M. Fletcher
- Preceded by: Leighton P. Slack
- Succeeded by: Hale K. Darling

Speaker of the Vermont House of Representatives
- In office 1910–1912
- Preceded by: Thomas C. Cheney
- Succeeded by: Charles Albert Plumley

Member of the Vermont House of Representatives from Bennington
- In office 1908–1912
- Preceded by: Robert Shields Drysdale
- Succeeded by: Fred C. Martin

Personal details
- Born: October 2, 1870 Heath, Massachusetts, US
- Died: July 20, 1956 (aged 85) Bennington, Vermont, US
- Resting place: Park Lawn Cemetery, Bennington, Vermont
- Party: Republican
- Spouse: Flora May Cummings (m. 1895)
- Children: 2
- Occupation: Newspaper publisher

Frank Edmund Howe (October 2, 1870 – July 20, 1956) was a Vermont newspaperman and politician who served as the 49th lieutenant governor of Vermont from 1912 to 1915.

== Biography ==
Frank Edmund Howe, nicknamed "Ginger" was born in Heath, Massachusetts on October 2, 1870 to Edmund Perry Howe and Laura A. (Worden) Howe. He was the great grandson of Gardner Howe, an early settler in Vermont and soldier in the Revolution, and he was a direct descendant of John Howe (1602-1680) who arrived in Massachusetts Bay Colony in 1630 from Brinklow, Warwickshire, England. Howe was also a descendant of Edmund Rice another early immigrant to Massachusetts.

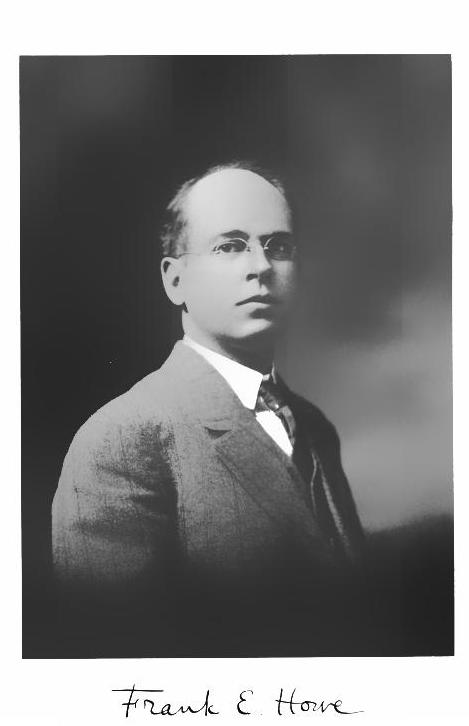
From 1912's Encyclopedia, Vermont Biography

He was raised and educated in Brattleboro, Vermont, attended West Brattleboro Academy, and trained as a printer. On October 2, 1895, he married Flora May Cummings. Howe worked as a reporter for newspapers in Vermont, New York and Florida before buying two Bennington, Vermont weeklies in 1902 and merging them to form the daily Bennington Banner, of which he was publisher and editor.

A Republican, Howe served in the Vermont House of Representatives from 1908 to 1912, and was Speaker from 1910 to 1912. He was a Republican presidential elector in 1908.

In 1912 Howe was elected lieutenant governor, serving until 1915. The end of Howe's term was extended from October, 1914 to January, 1915 in order for his successor's term to start in January. This extension was in keeping with a law changing the start date of Vermont's state legislative sessions and the start of the terms for all statewide office holders to January. He was an unsuccessful candidate for the Republican nomination for governor in 1914 and 1918, afterwards resuming management of his newspaper.

Howe died in Bennington on July 20, 1956. He is buried at Park Lawn Cemetery in Bennington.

Party political offices
Preceded by Leighton P. Slack	Republican nominee for Lieutenant Governor of Vermont; 1912	Succeeded by Hale K. Darling
Political offices
Preceded by Thomas C. Cheney	Speaker of the Vermont House of Representatives; 1910–1912	Succeeded by Charles Albert Plumley
Preceded by Leighton P. Slack	Lieutenant Governor of Vermont; 1912–1915	Succeeded by Hale K. Darling
