= Charles J. Bell (politician) =

American politician

Charles James Bell
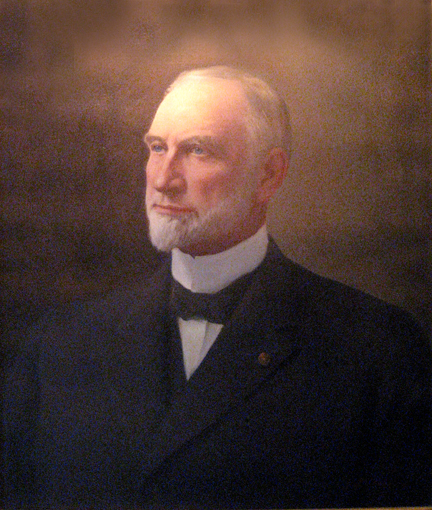
- Official Vermont State House portrait

50th Governor of Vermont
- In office October 6, 1904 – October 4, 1906
- Lieutenant: Charles H. Stearns
- Preceded by: John G. McCullough
- Succeeded by: Fletcher D. Proctor

Member of the Vermont Senate from Caledonia County
- In office 1894–1896 Serving with L. Downer Hazen
- Preceded by: Albro F. Nichols; Benjamin F. Lincoln
- Succeeded by: George P. Blair; Lorenzo W. Hubbard

Member of the Vermont House of Representatives from Walden
- In office 1882–1884
- Preceded by: Davison S. Ferguson
- Succeeded by: None (position not filled)

Personal details
- Born: March 10, 1845 Walden, Vermont, US
- Died: September 25, 1909 (aged 64) New York City, US
- Party: Republican
- Spouse: Mary Louisa Perry (1849–1918)
- Children: 2
- Profession: Farmer; Horse breeder

Military service
- Allegiance: United States (Union)
- Branch/service: Union Army
- Years of service: 1862–1865
- Rank: Corporal
- Unit: 15th Vermont Infantry Regiment; 1st Vermont Cavalry Regiment
- Wars: American Civil War: Battle of Appomattox Station

Charles James Bell (March 10, 1845 – September 25, 1909), a Republican, was the 50th governor of Vermont from 1904 to 1906.

A native of Walden, Vermont, Bell was educated locally and attended Peacham Academy. He enlisted in the Union Army during the American Civil War and served in the 15th Vermont Infantry Regiment and 1st Vermont Cavalry Regiment. He was wounded at Appomattox Station in April 1865 and was mustered out in June. After leaving the army, Bell became a successful farmer and horse breeder.

In addition to farming and breeding horses, Bell served in local offices and was a member of both the Vermont House of Representatives (1882–1884) and Vermont Senate (1894–1895). He served on the state Board of Railroad Commissioners (1894–1896), State Board of Agriculture (1896–1904), and was Secretary of the state Board of Cattle Commissioners (1898–1902).

In 1904, Bell was the successful Republican nominee for governor and he served one term, 1904 to 1906. After leaving office, he returned to his farming and horse-raising enterprises. Bell became ill while visiting New York City, and died at Grand Central Station while on board a train preparing to return to Vermont. He was buried at North Walden Cemetery, North Walden, Vermont.

== Early life and education ==
Bell was born in Walden, Vermont, on March 10, 1845, the son of James Dean Bell and Caroline (Warner) Bell. He attended the local schools, and graduated from Peacham Academy.

== Military service ==
At 17, Bell enlisted for the Civil War as a member of the Union Army's Company B, 15th Vermont Infantry Regiment. After he was mustered out in 1864, he reenlisted in Company C, 1st Vermont Cavalry Regiment and was promoted to Corporal. Bell was wounded at Appomattox Station in April 1865, and was mustered out in June. He then returned to Walden, where he farmed and raised horses.

== Post-Civil War ==
In addition to operating his farm and breeding horses, Bell was elected and appointed to various local offices, including school board member, selectman, and chairman of the select board. A Republican, he served in the Vermont House of Representatives from 1882 to 1884, and the Vermont Senate from 1894 to 1896.

He was a member of the state Board of Railroad Commissioners from 1894 to 1896, and member and secretary of the state Board of Agriculture from 1896 to 1904. From 1898 to 1902, Bell was a member and secretary of the state Board of Cattle Commissioners.

Bell also served as President of the Caledonia County Agriculture Society, a Director of the Vermont Agricultural Society, Treasurer and Master of the Vermont Grange, and an executive committee member and Secretary of the National Grange.

== Election as Governor ==
Bell was nominated for Governor in 1904. He easily won the general election, and he served two years, in keeping with the Vermont Republican Party's "Mountain Rule."

In August 1905, the United States Navy launched a new battleship, the USS Vermont. Bell led a delegation to the Quincy, Massachusetts shipyard for the christening ceremony, and his daughter Jennie performed the traditional task of breaking a bottle of champagne on the ship's bow.

During his administration Bell was involved in a controversy that gained national attention when he was besieged by pleas to commute the sentence of Mary Rogers, who had been convicted of murdering her husband. Opponents objected to executing a woman, or pleaded for mercy on the grounds of her difficult upbringing and youth and immaturity. Bell granted a reprieve so her appeals could be heard, and personally reconsidered her case, but ultimately decided to allow the original sentence to be carried out. Mary Rogers was executed by hanging in December 1905.

== Career after governorship ==
After leaving office Bell returned to his agricultural interests and remained active in the Grange and other farming organizations. In 1906 he received the honorary degree of LL.D. from Norwich University.

== Death and interment ==
Bell became ill while visiting New York City in September 1909. He decided to return home early, and died from a heart attack on September 25, while on a train at Grand Central Station. He was buried at North Walden Cemetery, North Walden, Vermont.

== Family ==
In 1870, Bell married Mary Louisa Perry of Cabot, Vermont. They were the parents of two daughters, Adine and Jennie.

== Sources ==
=== Books ===
- Coffin, Howard (2013). Something Abides: Discovering the Civil War in Today's Vermont. Woodstock, VT: Countryman Press. ISBN 978-1-58157-318-3.
- Crockett, Walter Hill (1921). Vermont: The Green Mountain State. Vol. 4. New York, NY: Century History Company.
- Ellis, William Arba (1911). Norwich University, 1819–1911; Her History, Her Graduates, Her Roll of Honor. Vol. 3. Montpelier, VT: Capital City Press.
- Walden History Committee (1986). A History of Walden, Vermont. Randolph Center, VT: Greenhills Books.

=== Newspapers ===
- "Mrs. Rogers Unmoved by News of Reprieve" (PDF). The New York Times. New York, NY. February 3, 1905.
- "Ex-Gov. C.J. Bell's Death" (PDF). The New York Times. New York, NY. September 27, 1909.
- "Woman Hanged: Mrs. Mary Rogers, the Murderess, Marched Unconcernedly to her Death". The Burlington Free Press. Burlington, VT. December 9, 1905 – via Newspapers.com.
- "Vermont Republican Ticket: Charles J. Bell for Governor" (PDF). The New York Times. New York, NY. July 1, 1904.

=== Internet ===
- Cox, Julie P.; Sanford, D. Gregory (1985). State Papers of Vermont: A Guide to the Papers of Vermont's Governors (PDF). Vol. 18. Montpelier, VT: James H. Douglas, Vermont Secretary of State. Archived from the original (PDF) on August 8, 2017.

Party political offices
Preceded by John G. McCullough	Republican nominee for Governor of Vermont; 1904	Succeeded by Fletcher D. Proctor
Political offices
Preceded by John G. McCullough	Governor of Vermont; 1904–1906	Succeeded by Fletcher D. Proctor
