= Percival W. Clement =

American politician (1846–1927)

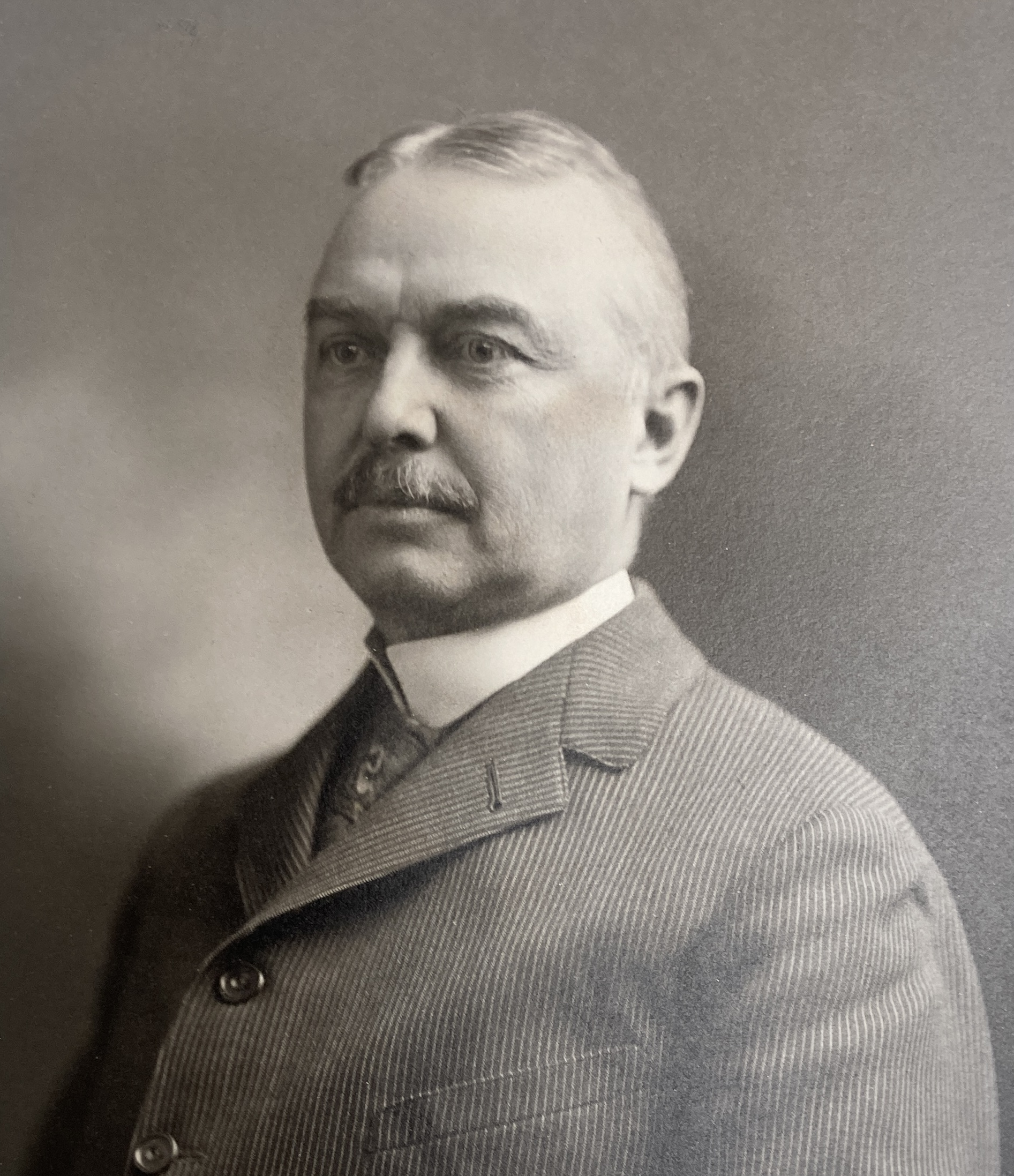
- Clement in 1900

57th Governor of Vermont
- In office January 9, 1919 – January 6, 1921
- Lieutenant: Mason S. Stone
- Preceded by: Horace F. Graham
- Succeeded by: James Hartness

Mayor of Rutland City, Vermont
- In office 1911–1912
- Preceded by: Henry O. Carpenter
- Succeeded by: Charles L. Howe
- In office 1897–1898
- Preceded by: Thomas H. Browne
- Succeeded by: William Y. W. Ripley

Member of the Vermont Senate from Rutland County
- In office 1900–1902 Serving with James H. Aiken, Philip R. Leavenworth, Elwin O. Aldrich
- Preceded by: Frederick S. Platt, Frank C. Partridge, Silas L. Griffith, Jesse E. Thomson
- Succeeded by: Frank J. Nelson, George E. Royce, Hiram F. Noyes, Quincy S. Backus

Member of the Vermont House of Representatives from Rutland Town
- In office 1892–1894
- Preceded by: Thomas W. Maloney
- Succeeded by: Louis M. Walker

Personal details
- Born: July 7, 1846 Rutland Town, Vermont, U.S.
- Died: January 9, 1927 (aged 80) Rutland City, Vermont, U.S.
- Party: Republican
- Spouse: Maria H. Goodwin Clement
- Education: Trinity College
- Profession: Businessman

Percival Wood Clement (July 7, 1846 – January 9, 1927) was an American politician who served as the 57th governor of Vermont from 1919 to 1921.

== Biography ==
Clement was born on July 7, 1846, in Rutland, Vermont, the son of Charles and Elizabeth (Wood) Clement. He was educated at Rutland High School and St. Paul's School in Concord, New Hampshire. Clement graduated from Trinity College in Hartford, Connecticut.

He married Maria H. Goodwin in 1868 and they had nine children.

== Career ==
Clement worked as a clerk in the business office of Clement and Sons Marble, the family business and a prominent company in Rutland County. He became a partner in 1871. He was also president of the Clement National Bank and the Rutland Board of Trade, and an owner of numerous railroad interests.

A Republican, Clement served in the Vermont House of Representatives from 1892 to 1894, and helped secure the charter for Rutland City to incorporate separately from Rutland Town. He served as Mayor of Rutland City from 1897 to 1898, and was succeeded by William Y. W. Ripley. Clement served in the Vermont Senate from 1900 to 1902, and ran unsuccessfully for governor in 1902 and 1906, in the latter year as a Democrat.

From 1911 to 1912 Clement served again as Rutland's Mayor. In 1912 he was chairman of the New England Railroad Conference Commission. The following year he served on the Vermont Educational Commission, and in 1917 he was a member of the executive committee of the Vermont Committee of Public Safety.

Vermont State House portrait painted in 1944 by John Christen Johansen

Elected in 1918, Clement served as Governor of Vermont from January 9, 1919, to January 6, 1921. During his term, the state legislature appropriated one million dollars to pay military draftees. He opposed women's suffrage and Prohibition, but Vermont ratified the Prohibition Amendment to the U.S. Constitution. Clement also pardoned his predecessor as governor, Horace F. Graham, who had been convicted of embezzlement while serving as State Auditor. When his term of office ended, he returned to his business affairs.

== Death ==
Clement died in Rutland on January 9, 1927, and is interred at Rutland's Evergreen Cemetery.

Party political offices
Preceded by Eli H. Porter	Democratic nominee for Governor of Vermont; 1906	Succeeded by James Edmund Burke
Preceded by Horace F. Graham	Republican nominee for Governor of Vermont; 1918	Succeeded by James Hartness
Political offices
Preceded by Horace F. Graham	Governor of Vermont; 1919–1921	Succeeded by James Hartness
