= Fletcher D. Proctor =

American politician (1860–1911)

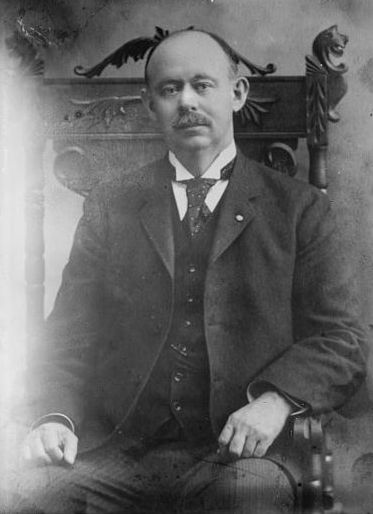

51st Governor of Vermont
- In office October 4, 1906 – October 8, 1908
- Lieutenant: George H. Prouty
- Preceded by: Charles J. Bell
- Succeeded by: George H. Prouty

Speaker of the Vermont House of Representatives
- In office 1900–1902
- Preceded by: Kittredge Haskins
- Succeeded by: John H. Merrifield

Member of the Vermont Senate
- In office 1892–1894 Serving with John A. Mead, John G. Pitkin, Araunuh W. Hyde
- Preceded by: Levi G. Kingsley, Albert J. Dickinson, Cyrus Jennings, Simon L. Peck
- Succeeded by: Frank D. White, Ira R. Allen, Amos D. Tiffany, Noah S. Walker
- Constituency: Rutland County

Member of the Vermont House of Representatives from Proctor
- In office 1904–1906
- Preceded by: George Herschel Davis
- Succeeded by: John C. Cameron
- In office 1900–1902
- Preceded by: Wilbur E. Higbee
- Succeeded by: George Herschel Davis
- In office 1890–1892
- Preceded by: Redfield Proctor
- Succeeded by: Benjamin F. Taylor

Personal details
- Born: Fletcher Dutton Proctor; November 7, 1860 Cavendish, Vermont, US
- Died: September 27, 1911 (aged 50) Proctor, Vermont, US
- Resting place: South Street Cemetery, Proctor, Vermont
- Party: Republican
- Spouse: Minnie Robinson Proctor (1865–1928)
- Relations: Redfield Proctor Jr. (brother)
- Children: 3, including Mortimer R. Proctor
- Parent(s): Redfield Proctor; Emily Dutton
- Education: Middlebury College; Amherst College (BA)
- Profession: Executive, Vermont Marble Company

Military service
- Allegiance: United States; Vermont
- Branch/service: Vermont National Guard
- Years of service: 1884–1887
- Rank: First lieutenant
- Unit: 1st Infantry Regiment, Vermont National Guard

Fletcher Dutton Proctor (November 7, 1860 – September 27, 1911) was an American businessman, a Republican politician, and the 51st governor of Vermont, who served from 1906 to 1908.

== Personal life ==
Proctor was born in Cavendish, Vermont, on November 7, 1860, the son of Vermont Governor Redfield Proctor and brother of Governor Redfield Proctor Jr. He was raised in Proctor, attended Middlebury College, and graduated from Amherst College in 1882. He received honorary degrees from the University of Vermont in 1907, Middlebury College in 1908, and Norwich University in 1908.

He married Minnie E. Robinson on May 26, 1886, and they had three children, Emily Proctor, Mortimer R. Proctor (who later served as governor), and Minnie Proctor.

== Career ==
Proctor was employed at his family's business, Vermont Marble, becoming president in 1889. He also served as President of the Clarendon & Pittsford Railroad and the Proctor Trust Company.

In 1883, Proctor was elected head of the Vermont division of the Sons of Veterans with the honorary rank of colonel, and he was often addressed by that title in contemporary newspaper accounts. Proctor enlisted in the Vermont National Guard's Company A, 1st Infantry Regiment in 1884 and was commissioned as a second lieutenant. He was promoted to first lieutenant and inspector of rifle practice on the regimental staff before resigning in 1887.

Proctor served in several local offices, including town selectman and school board member. A Republican, from 1886 to 1888 he was Secretary of Civil and Military Affairs (chief assistant) for Governor Ebenezer J. Ormsbee.

Proctor was a member of the Vermont House of Representatives from 1890 to 1892 and the Vermont Senate from 1892 to 1894. He served in the Vermont House again from 1900 to 1902 and 1904 to 1906 and was Speaker from 1900 to 1902.

== Governor ==
Elected governor in 1906, Proctor served from October 4, 1906, to October 8, 1908. As governor, rejecting his father's fiscal conservatism, he declared that the state had "a higher duty than to live cheaply." Proctor advocated progressive forestry policies, reorganized Vermont's courts and reformed the commission that regulated utilities and railroads. During his term as governor, Proctor's executive clerk was Aaron H. Grout, the son of former Governor Josiah Grout.

As governor, it also fell to Proctor to appoint a temporary replacement to the United States Senate seat left vacant by the death of his father, Redfield Proctor. He named former governor and congressman John W. Stewart, who served until a special election could be held to fill the remainder of Redfield Proctor's term. Fletcher Proctor was presumed to be prepared to follow in his father's footsteps, but declined to run for the Senate seat, which was won by Carroll S. Page. After completing his term as governor, Proctor returned to Vermont Marble and his other business interests in the town of Proctor.

== Death ==
Proctor died in the town of Proctor on September 27, 1911, after an illness of several weeks. He is interred at South Street Cemetery in Proctor.

Party political offices
Preceded by Charles J. Bell	Republican nominee for Governor of Vermont; 1906	Succeeded by George H. Prouty
Political offices
Preceded by Kittredge Haskins	Speaker of the Vermont House of Representatives; 1900 – 1902	Succeeded by John H. Merrifield
Preceded by Charles J. Bell	Governor of Vermont; 1906–1908	Succeeded by George H. Prouty
