= John G. McCullough =

American politician (1835–1915)

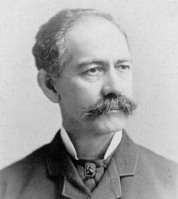

49th Governor of Vermont
- In office October 3, 1902 – October 6, 1904
- Lieutenant: Zed S. Stanton
- Preceded by: William W. Stickney
- Succeeded by: Charles J. Bell

President pro tempore of the Vermont Senate
- In office October 5, 1898 – October 2, 1900
- Preceded by: Ashbel A. Dean
- Succeeded by: Frederick W. Baldwin

Member of the Vermont Senate from Bennington County
- In office October 5, 1898 – October 2, 1900 Serving with Robert I. Batchelder
- Preceded by: Abraham B. Gardner; Albert P. Sheldon
- Succeeded by: Tyler D. Goodell; Allen L. Graves

9th Attorney General of California
- In office December 10, 1863 – December 5, 1867
- Governor: Frederick Low
- Preceded by: Frank M. Pixley
- Succeeded by: Jo Hamilton

Member of the California State Senate from the 5th District
- In office January 5, 1863 – December 9, 1863
- Preceded by: Samuel A. Merritt
- Succeeded by: Warren S. Montgomery

Member of the California State Assembly from Mariposa County
- In office January 7, 1862 – January 4, 1863
- Preceded by: Andrew J. Gregory, Daniel Showalter (Mariposa and Merced)
- Succeeded by: John W. Wilcox (Mariposa)

Personal details
- Born: September 16, 1835 Newark, Delaware, U.S.
- Died: May 29, 1915 (aged 79) New York City, U.S.
- Party: Republican
- Spouse: Eliza Hall Park
- Children: 4 (including Esther Morgan McCullough)
- Education: Delaware College; University of Pennsylvania Law School
- Profession: Attorney; Businessman

John Griffith McCullough (September 16, 1835 – May 29, 1915) was an American state legislator, businessperson and attorney. He served as Attorney General of California during the Civil War, and the 49th governor of Vermont from 1902 to 1904.

== Early life ==
John G. McCullough was born on September 16, 1835, in Newark, Delaware, to Albert and Rebecca (Griffith) McCullough. His father was Scotch-Irish, and his mother Welsh. An ancestor on his mother's side had fought in Oliver Cromwell's army.

His father died when he was three years old, and his mother four years later. Relatives and family friends took him in, and provided him with a private school education.

He attended Delaware College, and graduated first in his class with an AB degree after just two years of schooling. He clerked in the law firm of St. George Tucker Campbell in Philadelphia, Pennsylvania, while attending the University of Pennsylvania Law School. McCullough graduated with an LL.B. in 1858, and was admitted to the bar of Pennsylvania. After a heart attack he was advised to seek a warmer climate. He sailed to California, where he took up the practice of law in Mariposa, California.

== California years ==
McCullough supported Union General Edwin Vose Sumner when Sumner seized Fort Alcatraz in 1861, preventing Colonel Albert Sidney Johnston from using the fort in support of bringing California into the American Civil War on the side of the Confederacy.

His public speech-making in support of Sumner led to his election to the California State Assembly the same year as a Union Democrat. In 1862, he was elected to the California State Senate, and he served from January to December 1863. He was elected Attorney General in April 1863, but lost re-election in 1867. He moved to San Francisco, where he established a lucrative legal practice.

== Move to Vermont and governorship ==
He married Eliza Hall Park, daughter of Panama Railway president Trenor W. Park, on August 30, 1871. The couple had four children: a son, Hall Park McCullough, and daughters Elizabeth Laura McCullough, Ella Sarah "Sallie" McCullough, and Esther Morgan McCullough. He moved to Vermont in 1873, where he devoted himself to business.

His father-in-law appointed him vice-president and general manager of the Panama Railway. After Park's death in 1882, McCullough became the railroad's president. He helped reorganize the Erie Railroad in 1884 and 1893, becoming chairman of the company's executive committee. He was president of the Bennington and Rutland Railway from 1883 to 1900, and president of the Chicago and Erie Railroad from 1890 to 1900.

Active in post-Civil War politics as a Republican, McCullough was a delegate to the Republican National Conventions of 1880, 1888 and 1900, being elected chairman of the Vermont delegation in 1900. He was elected to the Vermont State Senate in 1898, and was chosen to serve as president pro tempore.

McCullough was elected Governor of Vermont in 1902. The Constitution of Vermont requires that if no candidate received a popular vote majority, the Vermont General Assembly chooses the governor. Republicans had long dominated Vermont politics, but in 1902, Percival W. Clement ran as a supporter of local option for regulating the sale of alcohol. In the general election, McCullough obtained 45.6% to 40.3% for Clement and 10.5% for Democrat Felix W. McGettrick. The General Assembly chose McCullough with 164 votes to 59 for Clement and 45 for McGettrick, and he took office in October. During his administration, Vermont overturned statewide prohibition in favor of a local option law. He also favored reform of the system for selecting state court judges, and primary elections instead of state party conventions. The state board of health was created during McCullough's term, as well as a system for corporate licensing fees. In accordance with the Republican Party's mountain rule, he was not a candidate for reelection in 1902.

== Later life ==
After leaving the governorship, McCullough became active in business again. He was president or a director of the First National Bank of North Bennington, the Bank of New York, the Fidelity & Casualty Co., National Life Insurance Company of Vermont, Hudson and Manhattan Railroad, Central Vermont Railroad, Atchison, Topeka and Santa Fe Railroad, and the Lackawanna Steel Company.

He received honorary Doctor of Laws degrees from Middlebury College in 1900, the University of Vermont in 1904, and Norwich University in 1905.

McCullough died in New York City on May 29, 1915. He is interred in the family vault at Bennington's Old First Church Cemetery.

== Notable placenames ==
The Park-McCullough Historic House, where Trenor Park and (after his death) Governor McCullough lived, was listed on the National Register of Historic Places in 1972.

The John G. McCullough Free Library in North Bennington, Vermont, was built by McCullough's widow, Eliza McCullough, in memory of her husband. The two-story brick building was designed by the firm of Renwick, Aspinwall & Tucker, and opened on August 24, 1921.

Party political offices
Preceded by William W. Stickney	Republican nominee for Governor of Vermont; 1902	Succeeded by Charles J. Bell
Political offices
Preceded by William W. Stickney	Governor of Vermont; 1902–1904	Succeeded by Charles J. Bell
