= List of people from Montpelier, Vermont =

The following list includes notable people who were born or have lived in the US city of Montpelier, Vermont.

== Artists and authors ==
- Frederick W. Adams, physician and author
- Michael Arnowitt, classical and jazz pianist
- Ruth Payne Burgess, painter
- Jessica Comolli, beauty queen
- Kathryn Davis, novelist
- Garrett Graff, editor and educator
- Rob Mermin, founder of Circus Smirkus
- Frank Miller, comic book writer and artist
- Anaïs Mitchell, singer-songwriter
- Angelia Thurston Newman, poet, author, lecturer
- Arthur E. Scott, photo-historian of US senate
- Daniel Pierce Thompson, author
- Samuel C. Upham, journalist and counterfeiter
- Thomas Waterman Wood, painter
- Eric Zencey, novelist and essayist

== Military ==
- John W. Clark, Union Army veteran and recipient of the Medal of Honor
- Dayton P. Clarke, Union Army veteran and recipient of the Medal of Honor
- Richard A. Cody, general, 31st Vice Chief of Staff of the United States Army
- Robert J. Coffey, Union Army veteran and recipient of the Medal of Honor
- Hannibal Day, Union Army brigadier general
- George Dewey, US Navy admiral
- William Charles Fitzgerald, US Navy lieutenant
- Thomas D. Kinley, US Army major general, resided in Montpelier
- William W. Noyes, Union Army veteran and recipient of the Medal of Honor
- James Stevens Peck, American Civil War officer who later served as Adjutant General of the Vermont National Guard
- Francis V. Randall, Union Army officer in the American Civil War
- Stephen Thomas, Union Army brigadier general and recipient of the Medal of Honor

== Politicians ==
- James H. Agen, Wisconsin State Assemblyman
- George H. Amidon, Vermont State Treasurer
- Howard E. Armstrong, Secretary of State of Vermont
- George W. Barker, U.S. Marshal for Vermont, Judge of Maniwitoc County, Wisconsin
- Francis K. Brooks, majority leader of the Vermont House of Representatives and member of the Vermont Senate
- George W. Cate, U.S. congressman
- Augustine Clarke, Anti-Masonic Party leader and Vermont State Treasurer
- Jedd Philo Clark Cottrill, Wisconsin state senator
- Ann Cummings, Montpelier mayor and member of the Vermont Senate
- Madelyn Davidson, Vermont State Treasurer
- Luther C. Dodge, mayor of Burlington, Vermont
- Benjamin F. Fifield, lawyer who served as United States Attorney for the District of Vermont, 1869–1880
- Charles E. Gibson Jr., Vermont Attorney General
- Mary Hooper, state representative and mayor of Montpelier
- George Howes, Vermont State Treasurer
- Vincent Illuzzi, state senator
- Elisha P. Jewett, Vermont State Treasurer
- Levi R. Kelley, Vermont State Treasurer
- Patrick Leahy, U.S. senator, President pro tempore of the United States Senate
- Ferrand F. Merrill, Secretary of State of Vermont
- Timothy Merrill, Secretary of State of Vermont
- Lucas Miltiades Miller, U.S. congressman from Wisconsin
- William Paddock, Wisconsin State Assembly
- John A. Page, Vermont State Treasurer
- Asahel Peck, 35th governor of Vermont
- Lucius Benedict Peck, U.S. congressman
- Andrew Perchlik, member of the Vermont Senate
- Clarence H. Pitkin, U.S. Attorney for Vermont and Washington County State's Attorney
- Charles W. Porter, Secretary of State of Vermont
- Samuel Prentiss, U.S. senator
- Theodore Prentiss, Wisconsin state assemblyman
- John H. Senter, U.S. Attorney for Vermont, Mayor of Montpelier, Vermont
- Stephen C. Shurtleff, attorney and Democratic politician
- Jeb Spaulding, member of the Vermont Senate, Vermont State Treasurer, Vermont Secretary of Administration, Chancellor of the Vermont State Colleges
- John Spaulding, Vermont State Treasurer
- John Mellen Thurston, U.S. senator
- William Upham, U.S. senator
- Eliakim Persons Walton, U.S. congressman
- Anne Watson, mayor of Montpelier
- Charles W. Willard, U.S. congressman
- David Wing Jr., Secretary of State of Vermont

== Law and judiciary ==
- Nicholas Baylies, Justice of the Vermont Supreme Court
- Louis P. Peck, Associate Justice of the Vermont Supreme Court
- Marilyn Skoglund, Justice of the Vermont Supreme Court, notable for becoming an attorney and judge without attending law school
- Charles Tetzlaff, United States Attorney for the District of Vermont
- John H. Watson, Chief Justice of the Vermont Supreme Court

== Sports ==
- Jim Laird, running back for several NFL teams
- Dave Moody, NASCAR commentator
- Bob Yates, professional football player
- Amanda Pelkey (born 1993), American professional ice hockey forward for the Boston Fleet, Olympic gold medalist (2018), two-time World Champion (2016, 2017), and Isobel Cup champion (2016)
