= Ruth Payne Burgess =

American painter

- Born: Ruth Payne Jewett; October 11, 1865; Montpelier, Vermont
- Died: March 11, 1934 (aged 68); New York, N.Y.
- Resting place: Green Mount Cemetery, Montpelier, Vermont
- Known for: Painting
- Spouse: John William Burgess (1885–1931, his death)
- Children: Elisha Payne Jewett Burgess

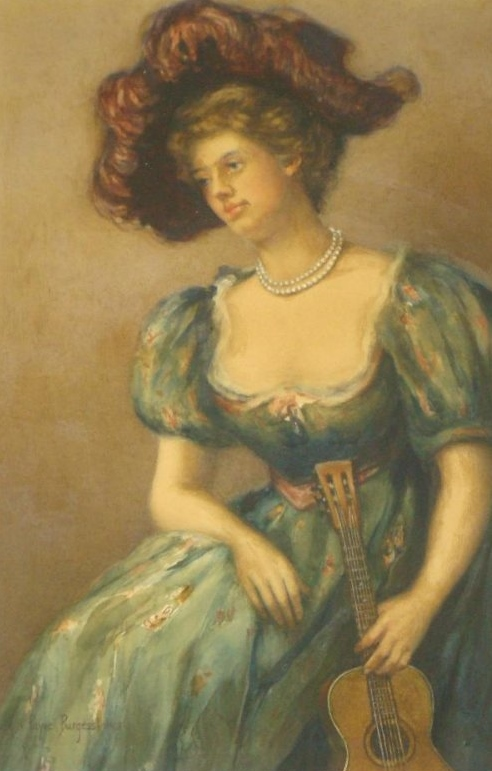
Ruth Payne Burgess, Young Woman with Violin and Hat, watercolor, 1903

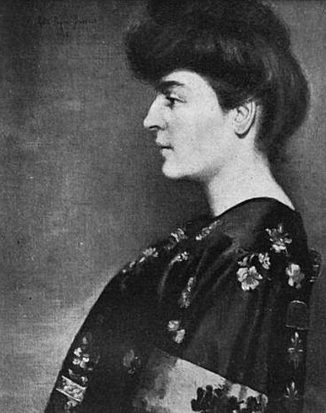
Ruth Payne Burgess, Portrait study of a young woman, (black-and-white image), 1915 Newport Art Exhibition

Ruth Payne Burgess (October 11, 1865 in Montpelier, Vermont – March 11, 1934 in New York) was a naturalistic painter of portraits, still lifes, and genre work.

== Personal life ==
Ruth Payne Jewett was born in Montpelier, Vermont in 1865, the daughter of Elisha P. Jewett and Julia Kellogg Field Jewett. Her grandparents were Captain Nathan Jewett and Ruth Payne and her great-grandfather was Elisha Payne. She attended school in Northampton, Massachusetts, at the Mary A. Burnham School.

Ruth Payne Jewett met John William Burgess in Vermont through a mutual friend, the artist Thomas Waterman Wood. Burgess founded the Columbia University's political science department. She married John William Burgess on September 2, 1885. Burgess was previously married on August 24, 1869, to Augusta Thayer Jones, who died in 1884.

She was described as an artist who was "highly intelligent, well educated, and an accomplished musician." Ruth and her husband had one child, Elisha Payne Jewett Burgess, and in 1905 had houses in New York City and Montpelier, Vermont. After John Burgess retired from Columbia, the couple lived in Newport, Rhode Island in a house named "Athenwood" and in Brookline, Massachusetts.

John William Burgess died of a heart attack in Brookline, Massachusetts on January 13, 1931. Ruth Payne Burgess died in March 1934 and her funeral was held on March 14. It was interrupted when her son, Elisha, a mining engineer, was arraigned after evading arrest for non-payment of spousal and child support for three years. Following the funeral her body was taken to a crematory in New Jersey. She was buried at Green Mount Cemetery in Montpelier.

== Education ==
Burgess studied at Barnard College, the National Academy of Design and the Art Students League of New York under George de Forest Brush, Kenyon Cox, and James Carroll Beckwith. She also studied in Europe and made paintings in Italy and Germany, where she painted the portrait of Prince August Wilhelm. (Note: Prince August Wilhelm of Prussia was born in 1887 and was the fourth son of William II, German Emperor, but the Smithsonian stated that she made a portrait of Price August William, second son of the kaiser. The second son of the kaiser was Prince Eitel Friedrich of Prussia, born in 1883.)

== Career ==
Burgess painted portraits, including Nicholas Murray Butler, the president of Columbia University; A. Barton Hepburn; and Admiral Charles E. Clark.

Her work was shown in nine exhibitions at the National Academy of Design from 1897 to 1906 as well as from 1924 to 1933. A report of the Newport Annual Exhibition in 1915 records a visitor as saying, "The picture I like best is this head by Mrs. Burgess, it's more natural and lifelike than any picture in the whole show". Her work contains orientalist themes.

In 1899 Burgess joined the National Association of Women Artists and the Woman's Art Club of New York, where she served as the organization's president from 1905 to 1910 and contributed to its financial growth. She was able to call on friends for money as well as make personal donations. Her donation of five hundred dollars contributed to the association offering a one hundred dollar prize for five years. Burgess was also president of the Art Students League for a period of time.

Additionally, Burgess was a member of groups such as the Academy of Fine Arts of Hartford, the American Water Color Society, the Society of New York Painters, and the Allied Artists of America. Burgess was a patron of the Metropolitan Museum of Art.

== Works ==
- Green Chinese Jar, oil on canvas, 1924
- Floral and Chinoiserie still life, oil on canvas, 1929
- Floral Still Life, oil on canvas, 1928
- Maderno, Lake of Garda, Italy, oil on canvas, 1931
- Poppy in a Vase, oil on canvas
- Portrait of a Gentleman, 1927
- Portrait of Dr. Daniel Bliss, Amherst College
- Portrait of Nicholas Murray Butler, the president of Columbia University
- Portrait of Jennie Churchill (Lady Randolph Churchill), 1894
- Portrait of Admiral Charles E. Clark Treasury Building, Washington, D.C.
- Portrait of Honorable A. B. Hepburn,
- Portrait of Professor Francis March, Amherst College
- Portrait of Judge Pierson, Public Library, Holyoke, Massachusetts
- Portrait of His Royal Highness, Prince August William, Potsdam, Berlin, Germany
- Portrait study of a young woman, exhibited in 1915 at an annual art exhibition in Newport, Rhode Island.
- Young Woman with Violin and Hat, watercolor, 1903
