= Frederick W. Baldwin (Vermont politician) =

American attorney and politician

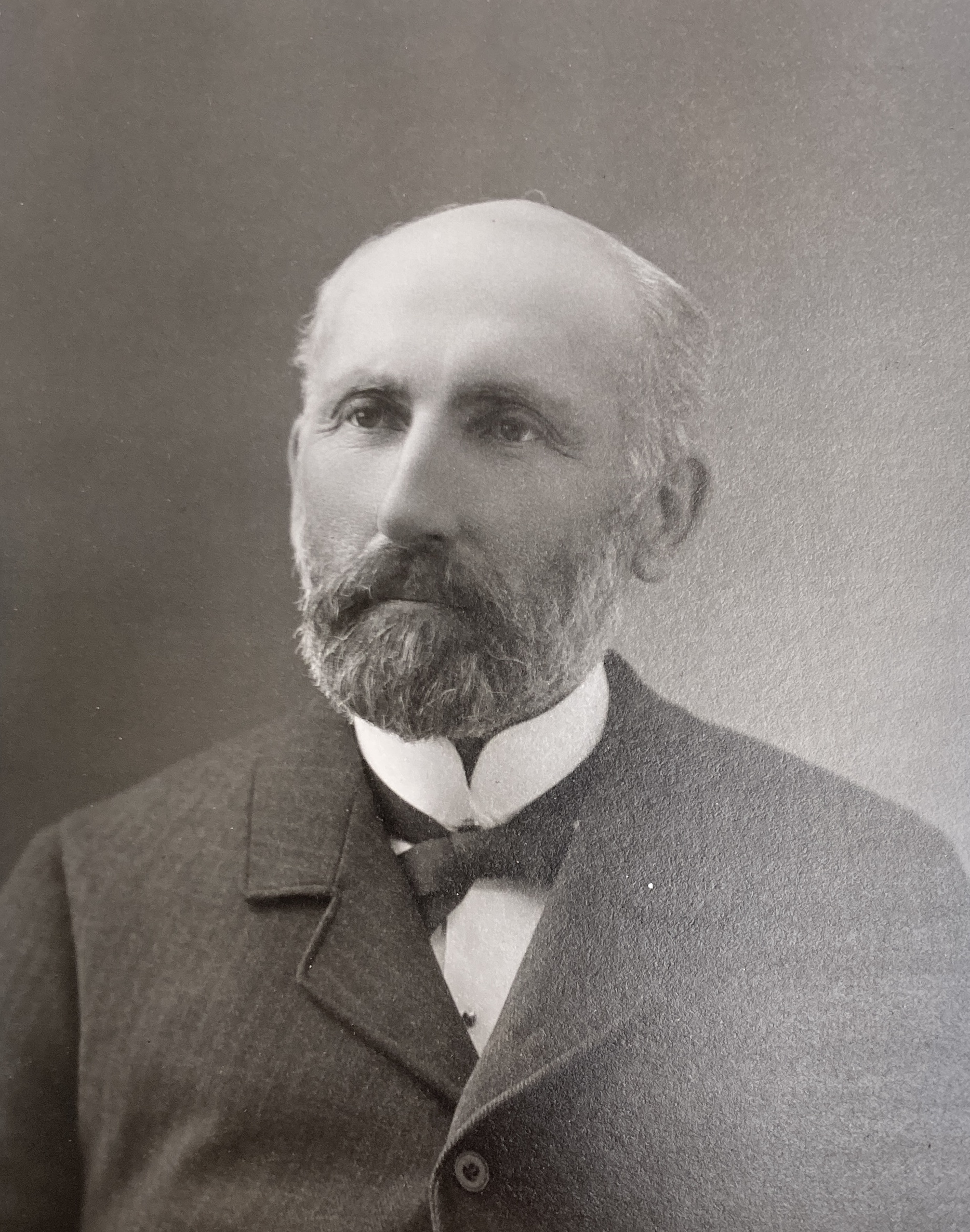
- Baldwin in 1900

President pro tempore of the Vermont Senate
- In office 1900–1902
- Preceded by: John G. McCullough
- Succeeded by: Chauncey W. Brownell

Member of the Vermont Senate from Orleans County
- In office 1900–1902 Serving with Asa B. Nelson
- Preceded by: John Young, Martin B. Chafey
- Succeeded by: Orien S. Annis, Lewis A. Jackson

Member of the Vermont House of Representatives from Barton
- In office 1896–1898
- Preceded by: Jonathan K. Fuller
- Succeeded by: Oscar D. Owen

State's Attorney of Orleans County, Vermont
- In office 1880–1882
- Preceded by: William R. Rowell
- Succeeded by: Charles A. Prouty

Secretary of the Vermont Senate
- In office 1874–1880
- Preceded by: Mason B. Carpenter
- Succeeded by: Chauncey W. Brownell

Personal details
- Born: September 29, 1848 Lowell, Vermont, US
- Died: September 8, 1923 (aged 74) Barton, Vermont, US
- Resting place: Welcome O. Brown Cemetery, Barton, Vermont
- Party: Republican
- Spouse(s): Susan M. Grout (m. 1873-1876, her death); Susan M. Hibbard (m. 1878-1906, her death); Jennie Deming Hibbard (m. 1913-1923, his death)
- Relations: William W. Grout (brother-in-law); Josiah Grout (brother-in-law)
- Education: Johnson Academy, Johnson, Vermont; Montpelier Seminary, Montpelier, Vermont
- Profession: Attorney

Frederick W. Baldwin (September 29, 1848 – September 8, 1923) was a Vermont attorney, businessman, historian, author and politician who served as President of the Vermont Senate.

== Biography ==
Frederick Wilton Baldwin was born in Lowell, Vermont on September 29, 1848. He was the son of Asa and Roselinda Baldwin, and the Baldwins were a family of English origin which had settled in Billerica, Massachusetts before coming to Cavendish, Vermont and then Lowell. Frederick Baldwin was educated at Johnson Academy and Montpelier Seminary, studied law with Philip K. Gleed and H. Henry Powers while teaching school, and was admitted to the bar in 1872. During the first years of his practice in Barton he was the partner of William W. Grout.

In addition to maintaining a thriving law practice, Baldwin was active in several business ventures, including serving as an officer or director of: The Barton Hotel Company; the Barton Manufacturing Company; the Barton Building Association; and the Barton Bank and Trust Company.

A Republican, Baldwin served as Assistant Secretary of the Vermont Senate from 1872 to 1873, and Senate Secretary from 1874 to 1879. He was Barton's Superintendent of Schools from 1873 to 1875 and again in 1877. Baldwin also served as a Village Trustee for 12 years, and was Orleans County State's Attorney from 1880 to 1882.

Baldwin was a member of the Orleans County Republican Committee 1884 to 1892, and was chairman from 1888 to 1890. He was one of Vermont's presidential electors in 1892, and was the elector deputized to carry Vermont's electoral votes to Washington, D.C. for the official tally.

In 1896 Baldwin served as Barton's member of the Vermont House of Representatives. In 1900 Baldwin was elected to the Vermont Senate, and was selected as Senate President.

Baldwin was a local historian and published the results of his work, including 1886's Biography of the Bar of Orleans County, Vermont, 1910's History of Bank of Orleans, Irasburgh Bank of Orleans, Barton National Bank, Barton Savings Bank, and Barton Savings Bank & Trust Company, and 1910's The Centennial Celebration of Runaway Pond, Glover, Vermont.

Baldwin died in Barton on September 8, 1923. He was buried at Welcome O. Brown Cemetery in Barton.

== Personal ==
Baldwin was married three times. His first wife was Susan M. Grout, a sister of General William W. Grout and Governor Josiah Grout. Frederick and Susan Baldwin had one child, a son named Edward Grout Baldwin. Susan Grout Baldwin died in 1876, and Frederick Baldwin's second wife was Susan M. Hibbard, who died in 1906. In 1913 he married Jennie Deming Hibbard.

Political offices
Preceded by John G. McCullough	President pro tempore of the Vermont State Senate; 1900–1901	Succeeded by Chauncey W. Brownell
