= Green Mount Cemetery (Montpelier, Vermont) =

Cemetery in Montpelier, Vermont

Coordinates: 44°15′28″N 72°35′47″W

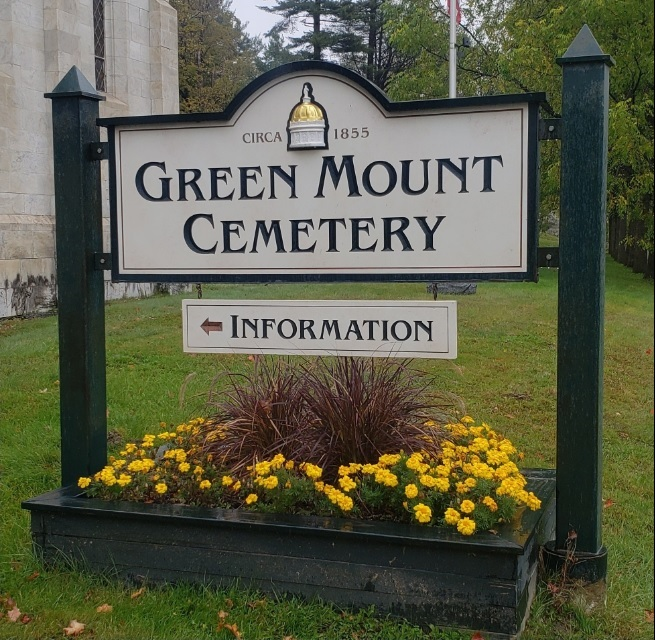
- Welcome sign, Green Mount Cemetery
- Interactive map of Green Mount Cemetery

Details
- Established: 1854
- Location: 250 State Street, Montpelier, Vermont
- Country: United States
- Type: Public
- Owned by: City of Montpelier, Vermont
- Size: 35 acres
- Website: Green Mount Cemetery

Green Mount Cemetery is a burial ground in Montpelier, Vermont. Located at 250 State Street, the 35-acre facility was established in 1854. It is operated by the City of Montpelier, and managed by the city's part time cemetery commission and a small full-time staff.

== History ==
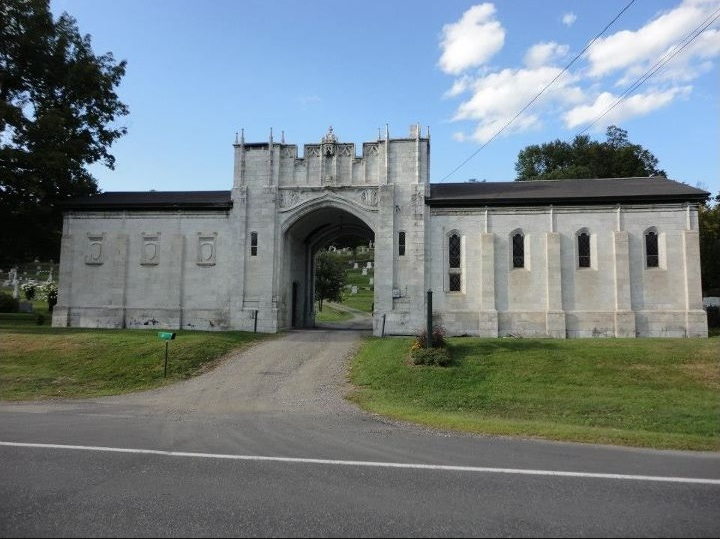
Entrance, Green Mount Cemetery

The land on which Green Mount Cemetery is located was purchased from Isaiah Silver in 1854. Of the $2,210 purchase price (about $70,000 in 2022), $1,000 was donated in accordance with the will of Calvin J. Keith, a Montpelier lawyer who died in 1853, and $1,210 came from the town government. In 1905, a bequest from John E. Hubbard enabled construction of the chapel-vault building. The vault portion can hold up to 60 entombments, while the chapel can accommodate 60 people for funeral services.

== Description ==
Green Mount Cemetery's grounds include many terraced lots along its hillsides, 2.5 miles of winding roads, and numerous ornamental shrubs and shade trees. The cemetery's many sculptures and unusual grave markers are a tourist attraction, and serve as a memorial to the talents of artisans from Vermont's granite and marble industries. Among these sculptures is a granite bench located at the grave of Daniel Pierce Thompson. Local lore also includes the story of 'Black Agnes', a supposed ghost that haunts the statue adorning the grave of John E. Hubbard, who died in 1899.

== Soldiers' Lot ==
The United States Department of Veterans Affairs (VA) maintains a 450-square-foot lot which was donated by Montpelier's citizens during the American Civil War. The lot was intended for burials of Union Army soldiers, and contains the remains of six Union veterans. The Soldiers' Lot is one of the smallest facilities maintained by the VA.

Burials in the Soldiers' Lot include: (Note: There are duplicate grave markers for Henry Black and William W. Whitney.)

- Black, Henry – Private in 3rd Maine Infantry, 17th Maine, and 20th Maine. Died at Montpelier's Sloan Army Hospital in 1865.
- Collins, Luther M. – Private in 17th Vermont Infantry. Died in 1871.
- Hand, Thomas – Private in Company I, 174th New York Infantry and 162nd New York Infantry. Later a member of 26th Company, 2nd Battalion, Veteran Reserve Corps. Died at Sloan Hospital in 1865.
- Mooney, John – Died at Sloan Army Hospital in 1865.
- Pierce, Ira Frank – Served in Company I, 11th Vermont Infantry, which was later designated 1st Vermont Heavy Artillery. Died in 1927.
- Whitney, William W. – Sergeant in 1st Vermont Cavalry. Died at Sloan Army Hospital in 1865.

== Notable burials ==
- George W. Bailey Jr., Secretary of State of Vermont
- John William Burgess, political scientist
- Ruth Payne Burgess, artist
- John W. Clark, recipient of the Medal of Honor
- Dayton P. Clarke, recipient of the Medal of Honor
- Robert J. Coffey, recipient of the Medal of Honor
- Benjamin F. Fifield, United States Attorney for the District of Vermont
- Benjamin Gates, Vermont Auditor of Accounts
- George H. Guernsey, architect
- Charles H. Heath, state politician
- George Howes, Vermont State Treasurer
- Fred A. Howland, Secretary of State of Vermont
- Elisha P. Jewett, Vermont State Treasurer
- Merrill W. Harris, President pro tempore of the Vermont Senate
- Levi R. Kelley, Vermont State Treasurer
- Ferrand F. Merrill, Secretary of State of Vermont
- Jonathan Peckham Miller, abolitionist
- Rawson C. Myrick, Secretary of State of Vermont
- John A. Page, Vermont State Treasurer
- James Stevens Peck, Adjutant General of the Vermont National Guard
- Lucius Benedict Peck, United States Representative (Vermont's 4th district)
- Clarence H. Pitkin, U.S. Attorney for Vermont
- Charles W. Porter, Secretary of State of Vermont
- Samuel Prentiss, United States Senator
- Timothy P. Redfield, Associate Justice of the Vermont Supreme Court
- Frederick M. Reed, Vermont Attorney General
- John H. Senter, U.S. Attorney for Vermont
- Stephen C. Shurtleff, attorney and Democratic politician
- John Spaulding, Vermont State Treasurer
- Mason S. Stone, Lieutenant governor of Vermont
- Stephen Thomas, recipient of the Medal of Honor
- Daniel Pierce Thompson, novelist who also served as Secretary of State of Vermont
- Eliakim Persons Walton, United States Representative (Vermont's 1st district)
- John H. Watson, Chief Justice of the Vermont Supreme Court
- Charles W. Willard, United States Representative (Vermont's 1st district)
- Thomas Waterman Wood, artist
