= Robert Coffey =

Robert Coffey may refer to:

- Robert L. Coffey (1918–1949), U.S. Representative from Pennsylvania
- Robert J. Coffey (1842–1901), Canadian soldier and American Civil War Medal of Honor recipient
