= Charles E. Clark =

Charles E. Clark may refer to:

- Charles Edgar Clark, United States Navy officer
- Charles Edward Clark, American lawyer and federal judge
