= Elisha P. Jewett =

Figure in Vermont history (1801–1894)

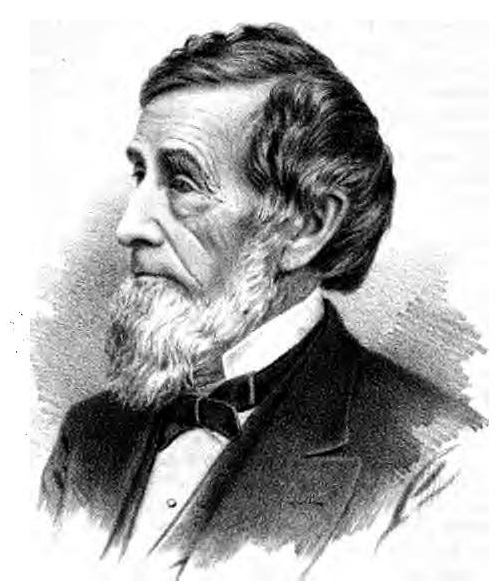

Vermont State Treasurer
- In office 1846–1847
- Preceded by: John Spaulding
- Succeeded by: George Howes

Member of the Vermont House of Representatives from Montpelier
- In office 1855–1856
- Preceded by: Abijah Keith
- Succeeded by: Ferrand F. Merrill

Personal details
- Born: June 5, 1801 Lebanon, New Hampshire, US
- Died: August 19, 1894 (aged 93) Montpelier, Vermont
- Resting place: Green Mount Cemetery, Montpelier, Vermont
- Party: Whig (before 1854); Republican (from 1854)
- Spouse: Julia Kellogg Field (m. 1861-1890, her death)
- Children: 1 (Ruth Payne Jewett )
- Occupation: Businessman

Elisha P. Jewett (June 5, 1801 – August 19, 1894) was a Vermont businessman, banker and political figure who served as Vermont State Treasurer.

== Biography ==
Elisha Payne Jewett was born in Lebanon, New Hampshire on June 5, 1801. He was the son of Nathan Jewett (1767–1861) and Ruth Payne (1770–1828), early settlers of Montpelier, Vermont. Ruth Payne Jewett was the daughter of Elisha Payne. Elisha Payne Jewett was raised and educated in Montpelier, and at age 15 he was apprenticed to Daniel Baldwin, a local merchant.

At age 21 Jewett began his own business career, attaining success in the mercantile partnerships of Hubbard & Jewett and Jewett, Howes & Co. Jewett was later involved in railroad construction, including sections of the Vermont Central Railroad and Ontario's Great Western Railway. Jewett's business success enabled him to later become a gentleman farmer. He was also president of the Bank of Montpelier and a member of the board of directors of the Montpelier Savings Bank. Jewett was also one of the original commissioners of Montpelier's Green Mount Cemetery.

Jewett served in the militia as a colonel and member of the staff of Charles Paine when Paine served as governor. A Whig in politics, Jewett served as Vermont State Treasurer from 1846 to 1847, and he was a member of the Vermont House of Representatives in 1855. Jewett became a Republican when that party was founded in the mid-1850s, and was one of Vermont's presidential electors in 1872.

== Death and burial ==
Jewett died in Montpelier on August 19, 1894. He was buried at Green Mount Cemetery in Montpelier.

== Family ==
In 1861 Jewett married Julia Kellogg Field of Brattleboro, Vermont. They were the parents of a daughter, Ruth Payne Jewett (1865–1934). Ruth Payne Jewett was a well-known painter and the wife of John W. Burgess.

== Legacy ==
The Elisha Jewett House at 157 State Street is part of the Montpelier Historic District, which is listed on the National Register of Historic Places.

Party political offices
Preceded by John Spaulding	Whig nominee for Vermont State Treasurer; 1846	Succeeded by George Howes
Political offices
Preceded by John Spaulding	Vermont State Treasurer; 1846–1847	Succeeded by George Howes
