= Chauncey W. Brownell =

Vermont, US, politician (1847–1938)

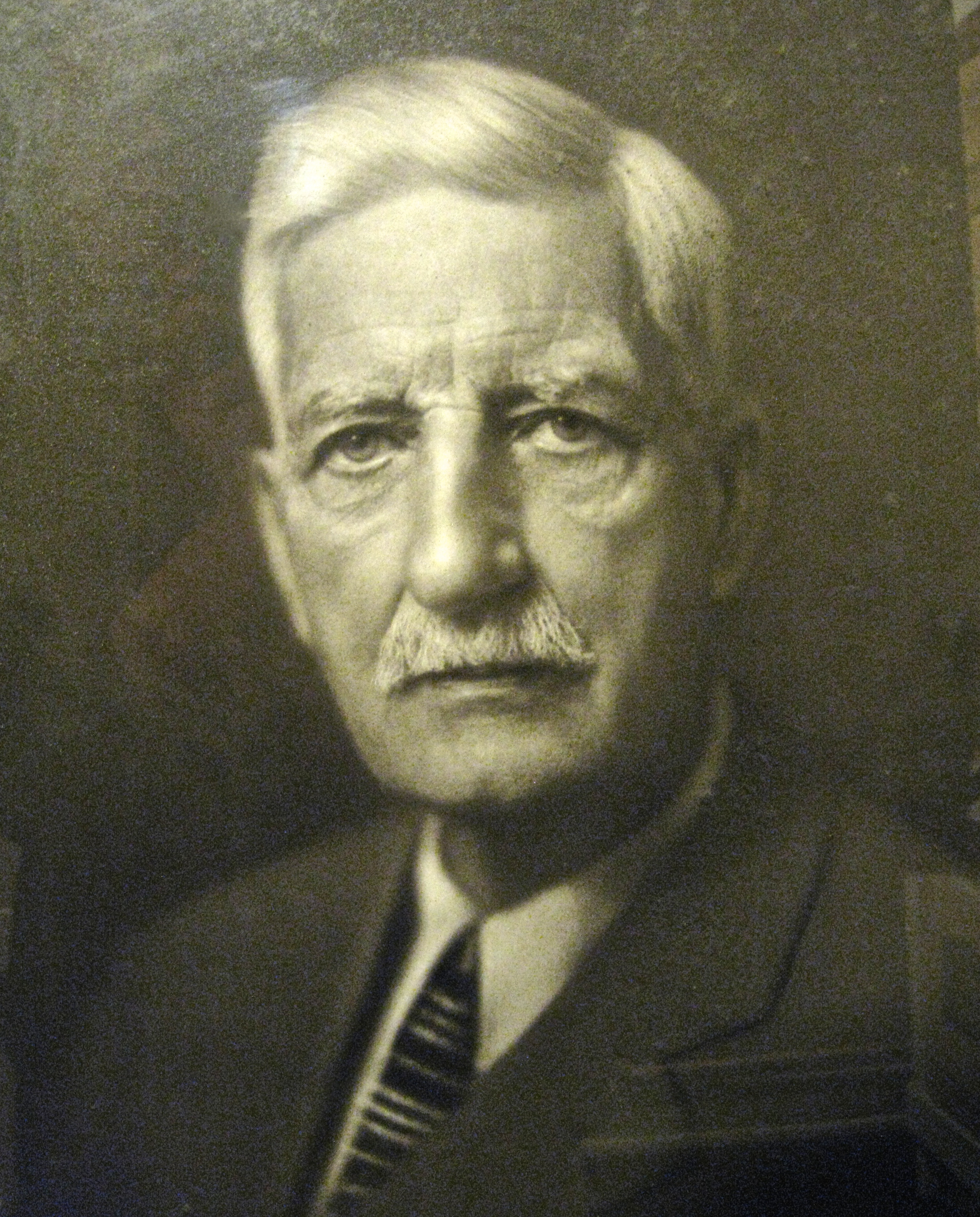

President pro tempore of the Vermont Senate
- In office October 1, 1902 – October 3, 1904
- Preceded by: Frederick W. Baldwin
- Succeeded by: George H. Prouty

Member of the Vermont Senate from Chittenden County
- In office October 1, 1902 – October 3, 1904 Serving with Charles J. Russell, Elliot M. Sutton
- Preceded by: William H. H. Varney, Rufus E. Brown, William J. Fuller
- Succeeded by: Calvin S. Isham, Charles S. Ashley, Albert T. Stevens

Secretary of State of Vermont
- In office October 2, 1890 – October 4, 1898
- Governor: Carroll S. Page; Levi K. Fuller; Urban A. Woodbury; Josiah Grout
- Preceded by: Charles W. Porter
- Succeeded by: Fred A. Howland

Secretary of the Vermont Senate
- In office October 6, 1880 – September 30, 1890
- Preceded by: Frederick W. Baldwin
- Succeeded by: George M. Powers

State's Attorney of Chittenden County, Vermont
- In office 1884–1886
- Preceded by: Julius W. Russell
- Succeeded by: David J. Foster

Personal details
- Born: October 7, 1847 Williston, Vermont
- Died: February 4, 1938 (aged 90) Williston, Vermont
- Resting place: Lakeview Cemetery, Burlington, Vermont
- Party: Republican
- Spouse: Elva Maria Brigham (m. 1875–1920, her death)
- Children: 4
- Education: University of Vermont; Albany Law School
- Profession: Attorney

Chauncey Wells Brownell (October 7, 1847 – February 4, 1938) was a Vermont attorney and politician who served as President of the Vermont State Senate and Vermont Secretary of State.

== Biography ==
Chauncey Wells Brownell was born in Williston, Vermont on October 7, 1847, the son of Chauncey Wells Brownell (1811–1892) and Laura Chapin Higbee Brownell (1815–1852). The elder Brownell was a farmer who served in both the Vermont House of Representatives and Vermont Senate.

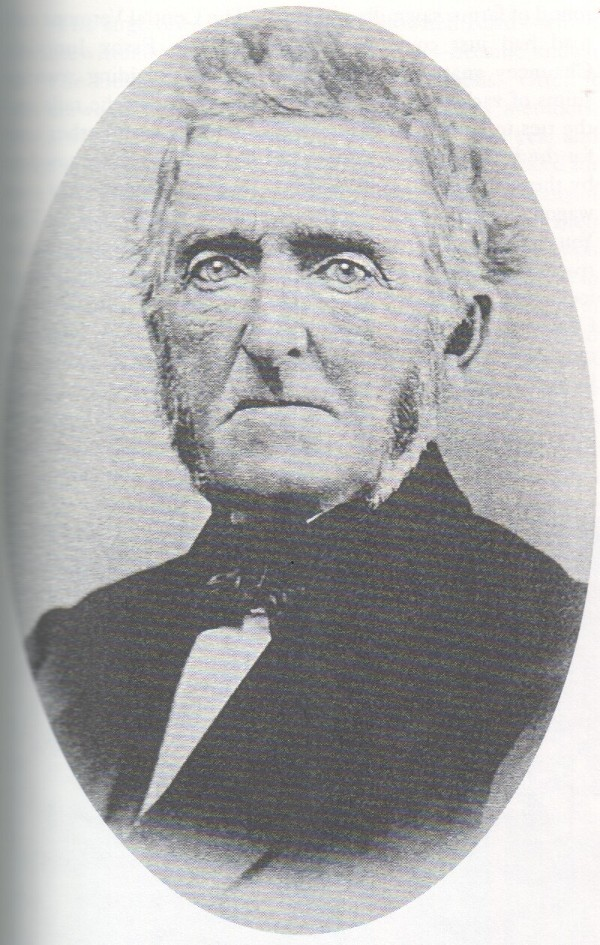
Chauncey Wells Brownell (1811–1892) – father

The younger Brownell graduated from the University of Vermont in 1870 and Albany Law School in 1872. Brownell received a Master of Arts degree from UVM in 1873.

Brownell became a lawyer in Burlington. He was also active in local businesses, including serving on the board of directors of Burlington's electric street railway, board of directors member of the Burlington Building and Loan Association, Vice President of the city's Home Savings Bank, and President of the Burlington Mutual Fire Insurance Company.

A Republican, he was Burlington's Grand Juror (municipal court prosecutor) for two years, and State's Attorney of Chittenden County from 1884 to 1886. He served as Assistant Secretary of the Vermont Senate from 1874 to 1880, and Senate Secretary from 1880 to 1890. In 1890 Brownell was elected Secretary of State, serving until 1898.

In 1900 Brownell was elected a Burlington Alderman. In 1902 he was elected to one term in the Vermont Senate and was chosen to serve as President pro tempore.

Brownell died in Williston on February 4, 1938. He was buried at Lakeview Cemetery in Burlington.

== Family ==
In 1875, Brownell married Elva Maria Brigham (1850–1920). They were the parents of four children – Carl, Elva, Chauncey, and Henry.

Party political offices
Preceded by Charles W. Porter	Republican nominee for Secretary of State of Vermont; 1890, 1892, 1894, 1896	Succeeded by Fred A. Howland
Political offices
Preceded by Frederick W. Baldwin	President pro tempore of the Vermont State Senate; 1902–1904	Succeeded by George H. Prouty
Preceded by Charles W. Porter	Secretary of State of Vermont; 1890–1898	Succeeded by Fred A. Howland
