= Benjamin Carpenter =

American politician (1725–1804)

Benjamin Carpenter (May 17, 1725 – March 29, 1804) was a leader of colonial Vermont who served as an officer in the American Revolution and as lieutenant governor.

== Biography ==
Benjamin Carpenter was born in Swansea, Massachusetts on May 17, 1725. He lived in Massachusetts, Connecticut and Rhode Island prior to settling in Vermont in 1770.

Carpenter became involved in the early politics of Vermont, particularly the ongoing dispute between New Hampshire and New York over which one should have the jurisdiction, as well as the ability to sell land grants to white settlers. Siding with those who had purchased land grants from New Hampshire and favored Vermont's independence, Carpenter was kidnapped by pro-New York forces in 1783. He was released on the condition that he petition the Vermont government for release of imprisoned members of the pro-New York group, something he never did.

At the start of the Revolution Carpenter served as chairman of his county Committee of Safety, and was appointed a Lieutenant Colonel in the militia. In addition, he served as a member of Vermont's Council of Safety.

In 1779 Carpenter was elected Lieutenant Governor, and he served until 1781. Carpenter served as a member of the Council of Censors in 1783.

Benjamin Carpenter was a devout Baptist. In addition to serving as a deacon for more than 50 years, he also took to the pulpit on occasion to lead services and preach sermons.

Carpenter died on Guilford, Vermont on March 29, 1804. He was buried in West Guilford's Carpenter Cemetery.

== Liberty Ship ==
A United States Liberty Ship called the SS Benjamin Carpenter was named for him. It was a standard 10,000 ton Liberty Ship with hull number 2786. It was laid down on 25 March 1944 and launched on 14 April 1944. The ship was scrapped in 1960.

Preceded by Joseph Marsh	Lieutenant Governor of Vermont (Independent Republic); 1779–1781	Succeeded by Elisha Payne
