= Elderkin Potter =

American politician and lawyer (1782–1845)

Member of the Ohio House of Representatives from the Columbiana County district
- In office 1827–1829 Serving with Fisher A. Blocksom, Robert Forbes, James Early, Nathaniel Meyer
- Preceded by: Fisher A. Blocksom, John Hessin, De Lorma Brooks
- Succeeded by: James Early, Jacob Roller, James Marshall

Personal details
- Born: August 16, 1782 Norwich, Vermont, U.S.
- Died: October 1845 (aged 63) New Lisbon, Ohio, U.S.
- Spouse(s): Jane Waugh; Lydia Spaulding
- Relatives: Lyman Potter Jr. (brother); Elisha Payne (grandfather)
- Education: Dartmouth College
- Occupation: Politician; lawyer

Elderkin Potter (August 16, 1782 – October 1845) was an American politician and lawyer from Ohio. He served as a member of the Ohio House of Representatives, representing Columbiana County from 1827 to 1829.

== Early life ==
Elderkin Potter was born on August 16, 1782, in Norwich, Vermont, to Abigail (née Payne) and Lyman Potter. His father was a reverend and farmer. His maternal grandfather was Elisha Payne of Lebanon, New Hampshire. His brother Lyman Potter Jr. was a member of the Ohio House of Representatives, representing Trumbull County.

Potter graduated from Dartmouth College in 1802. He read law with Obadiah Jennings of Steubenville, Ohio, in 1803. He was admitted to the bar in 1806. While at Dartmouth, he became a member of the United Fraternity.

== Career ==
Potter practiced law in New Lisbon, Ohio, until his death. In 1810, Potter was elected as prosecuting attorney of Columbiana County. In 1814, Potter worked as cashier of the Columbiana Bank of New Lisbon.

Potter served as a member of the Ohio House of Representatives, representing Columbiana County, from 1827 to 1829.

In 1834, Potter helped break ground of the Sandy and Beaver Canal Company. He was a director of the company and advocated for its creation. In 1837, he was on the building committee of the Presbyterian Church.

== Personal life ==
Potter married Jane Waugh, daughter of Reverend Waugh, of Pennsylvania around 1828. He married Lydia Spaulding of Connecticut.

Potter died in October 1845 in New Lisbon.
