= Athenwood and the Thomas W. Wood Studio =

Historic house in Vermont, United States

- Athenwood and Thomas W. Wood Studio
- U.S. National Register of Historic Places
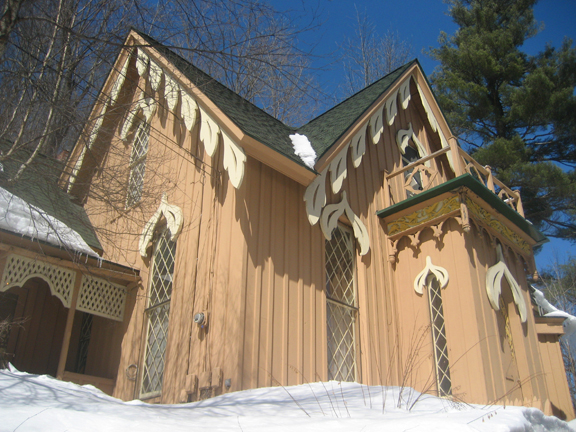
- Athenwood looking west from Northfield Street

- Location within Vermont Location within the United States
- Location: 39 and 41 Northfield St. Montpelier, Vermont
- Coordinates: 44.2556°N 72.5789°W
- Area: less than ten acres
- Built: 1850
- Architect: Thomas Waterman Wood
- Architectural style: Carpenter Gothic
- NRHP reference No.: 74000259
- Added to NRHP: June 13, 1974

Athenwood and the Thomas W. Wood Studio are a pair of distinctive historic buildings at 39 and 41 Northfield Street in Montpelier, Vermont, United States. The two Carpenter Gothic buildings were the home and studio of Thomas Waterman Wood (November 12, 1823 – April 14, 1903), an American painter and native of Montpelier. The buildings, now private residences, were listed on the National Register of Historic Places in 1974.

== Description and history ==
Wood built the house in 1850–1851 when the area across the Winooski River from downtown Montpelier was part of the town of Berlin. He named the house Athenwood for his wife, Minerva Robinson Wood. (Minerva was the Roman goddess of wisdom, and Athena was her Greek counterpart.) Located at 39 and 41 Northfield Street, the house and studio are now private residences.

The wooden house is built in the Carpenter Gothic style, a part of the Gothic Revival architectural movement of the 19th century. Wood designed the house, and was likely influenced by popular pattern books circulated by Alexander Jackson Davis and Andrew Jackson Downing. Living for a part of the year in Boston, Massachusetts, Wood built Athenwood as a summer home and workplace. The house was faced in shiplap siding, and the windows, eaves, and porches trimmed in cut wooden patterns like upended petals, running grape leaves, and ivy. Trained as a cabinetmaker, Wood may have carved the wood trim himself. A small balcony on the east side of the house, entered from the second floor, has elaborate Gothic balusters. In the current use as a private home, some of the original furnishings, including two small marble busts of Athena, remain in the parlor.

Later, about 1880, Wood built a separate studio building just northwest of the house. It too is built in the Carpenter Gothic style but includes influences of Italianate architecture. In February 1898 this part of Berlin was annexed becoming Montpelier's Ward Six.

== See also ==
- National Register of Historic Places listings in Washington County, Vermont

== Gallery ==
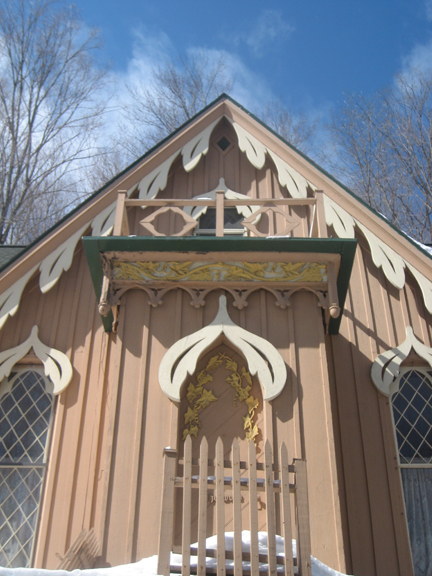
Athenwood front entrance showing carved ivy on door and cornice

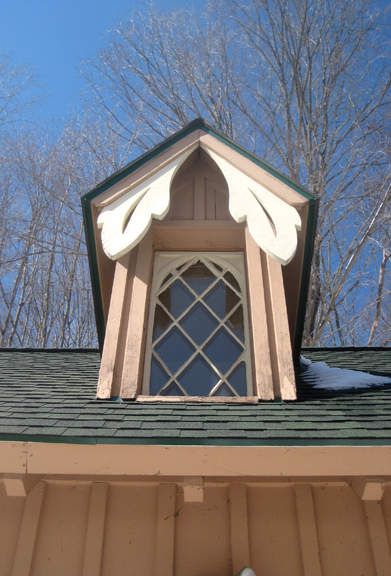
Athenwood detail of dormer window

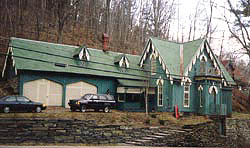
Athenwood, painted green, before its repainting in stone, cream, and gold colors
