= Elisha Payne =

American judge (1731–1807)

3rd Lieutenant Governor of the Vermont Republic
- In office October 1781 – 1782
- Preceded by: Benjamin Carpenter
- Succeeded by: Paul Spooner

Chief Justice of the Supreme Court of Vermont
- In office 1781–1782
- Preceded by: Moses Robinson
- Succeeded by: Moses Robinson

Member of the New Hampshire Senate 2nd District
- In office 1786–1787
- Preceded by: Francis Worcester
- Succeeded by: Francis Worcester

Personal details
- Born: March 7, 1731 Canterbury, Connecticut, British America
- Died: July 20, 1807 (aged 76) Lebanon, New Hampshire, United States
- Resting place: East Lebanon Cemetery
- Spouse(s): Anna Waldo (1753–1759); Elizabeth Spaulding (1762–1809)
- Relations: Elisha P. Jewett (grandson); Elderkin Potter (grandson); Lyman Potter Jr. (grandson); Ruth Payne Burgess (great-granddaughter)
- Education: Yale College
- Profession: Lawyer; Merchant

Military service
- Allegiance: United States
- Branch/service: Vermont militia New Hampshire militia
- Years of service: Vermont militia: 1781; New Hampshire militia: 1775–1776
- Rank: Major general in the Vermont militia Lieutenant Colonel in the New Hampshire militia

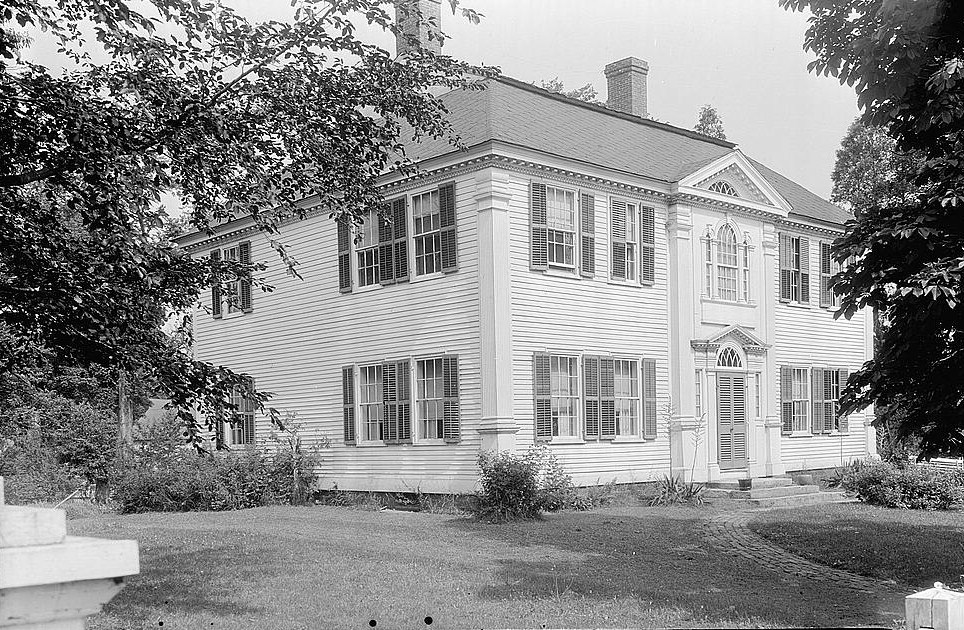
Elisha Payne House, Canterbury (Windham County, Connecticut). Today the Prudence Crandall Museum.

Elisha Payne (7 March 1731 – 20 July 1807) was a prominent businessman and political figure in the states of New Hampshire and Vermont following the events of the American Revolution. He is best known for serving as Lieutenant Governor of the Vermont Republic and Chief Justice of the Supreme Court of Vermont.

== Early life ==
The son of a prominent cleric of the same name, Elisha Payne was born in Canterbury, Connecticut, on March 7, 1731. He graduated from Yale College in 1750, studied law, and attained admission to the bar. In addition, Payne was a partner with his brother-in-law in a successful mercantile business.

== Career ==
From 1765 to 1768 Payne served in the Connecticut Assembly.

In 1774 Payne relocated to Orange, New Hampshire, then called Cardigan, where he practiced law, farmed, and operated a successful saw and gristmill. In addition, he served in the New Hampshire House of Representatives.

In 1775 Payne was appointed a lieutenant colonel in the New Hampshire militia. In 1776 he was named a Judge of the Court of Common Pleas and Register of Probate for Grafton County.

In 1780 Payne relocated to Lebanon, New Hampshire. During this period Vermont was an independent republic, and for several years there was a political movement to join New Hampshire's Connecticut River Valley towns, including Lebanon, to Vermont. In 1778 members of this movement tried to induce Payne and his townsmen to join by appointing Payne to Vermont's Governor's Council, but Payne declined.

In 1781 Payne was elected to the Vermont House of Representatives. He was subsequently elected Lieutenant Governor of Vermont and appointed Chief Justice of the Vermont Supreme Court. In addition, he was appointed a major general in the Vermont militia. Payne was appointed in 1782 as one of Vermont's delegates to negotiate with the Continental Congress.

After the attempted union of western New Hampshire and Vermont was ended, Payne resumed his involvement in New Hampshire politics and government, serving in the New Hampshire Senate from 1786 to 1787, and the New Hampshire House of Representatives from 1787 to 1788. He served in the New Hampshire House again in 1790, 1793, 1796 to 1797, and 1800. He was also an unsuccessful candidate for the United States House of Representatives in a 1789 special election.

Payne was treasurer of Dartmouth College from 1779 to 1780, and a trustee of the college from 1784 to 1801.

In 1788 Payne was a delegate to the New Hampshire convention that considered adoption of the United States Constitution and voted for its ratification. Payne also appears to have been the final clinching vote of the New Hampshire legislature that ultimately ratified the United States Constitution. The final vote in the New Hampshire legislature was 57–47, which means that Payne's fifty-third vote was the deciding vote needed to officially ratify the United States Constitution.

== Personal life ==
Payne was married twice: first to Anna Waldo (1753–1759) and, after her death, to Elizabeth Spaulding (1762–1809). Among his children were:

- Ruth Payne (1770–1828), who married Nathan Jewett (1767–1861); parents of Vermont State Treasurer Elisha Payne Jewett and grandparents of painter Ruth Payne Burgess.
- Abigail Payne, who married Lyman Potter; parents of Lyman Potter Jr. and Elderkin Potter, both members of the Ohio House of Representatives.

Payne died in Lebanon on July 20, 1807. He was buried in East Lebanon Cemetery.

Preceded by Benjamin Carpenter	Lieutenant Governor of Vermont (Independent Republic); 1781–1782	Succeeded by Paul Spooner
Preceded by Moses Robinson	Chief Justice of the Vermont Supreme Court; 1781–1782	Succeeded by Moses Robinson
