= George Nichols (American politician) =

American politician

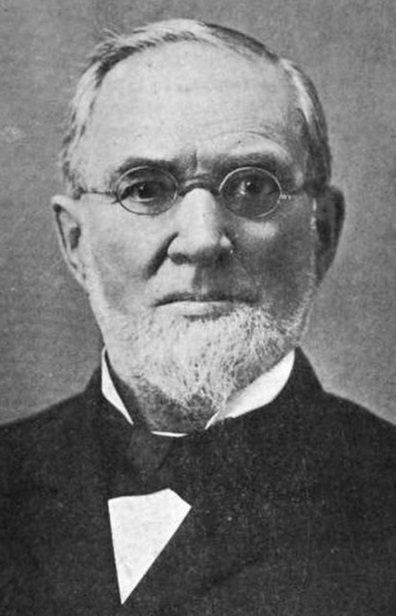
George Nichols, Vermont Secretary of State and Norwich University president.

George Nichols (April 17, 1827—April 28, 1907) was a Vermont physician, politician, and educator. He was a Union Army veteran of the American Civil War, and served as Secretary of State of Vermont and acting president of Norwich University.

== Biography ==
George Nichols was born in Northfield, Vermont on April 17, 1827. He was educated in Northfield, attended Newbury Seminary, and taught school beginning at age 15. He then studied medicine in Northfield with Dr. Samuel W. Thayer Jr., after which he attended Vermont Medical College in Woodstock. After graduating in 1851, Nichols practiced in Northfield, in addition to owning and operating a drugstore. From 1848 to 1853, Nichols served as Vermont's state librarian.

In 1862, Nichols joined the Union Army for the American Civil War. As the regimental surgeon for the 13th Vermont Infantry, his service included participation in the Battle of Gettysburg, where he was in charge of a field hospital for the I Corps. After the war, Nichols resumed practicing medicine and operating his drug store. Nichols also served in local offices, including town meeting moderator.

A Republican in politics, in 1865, Nichols became Vermont's Secretary of State; he held the position until 1884. In 1870, he was president of the state constitutional convention that changed terms for Vermont's state offices from one year to two. Republicans won every statewide election for more than 100 years beginning with the party's founding in the mid-1850s; in addition to serving as the state party's secretary, Nichols ran its statewide campaigns in 1872, 1876 and 1880. He also served as Vermont's member of the Republican National Committee, and was a delegate to the 1872 Republican National Convention.

Nichols was active in several other business ventures, including clerk and treasurer of the Vermont and Canada Railroad, and president of the Northfield National Bank. He was also a trustee of the Northfield Institution; when it was reorganized as the Northfield Graded and High School, he served as a member of the school board. Nichols served on the Norwich University board of trustees, and was the college's treasurer from 1866 to 1878. In 1881, he received the honorary degree of LL.D. He was a Norwich vice president from 1885 to 1895, and served as acting president.

== Death and burial ==
Nichols died in Northfield on April 28, 1907. He was buried at Elmwood Cemetery in Northfield.

== Family ==
In 1852, Nichols married Ellen Maria Blake of Vergennes. They were the parents of two children, both of whom died in infancy.

== Sources ==
=== Books ===
- Ellis, William Arba (1911). Norwich University, 1819-1911: Her History, Her Graduates, Her Roll of Honor. Vol. 3. Montpelier, VT: Capital City Press. pp. 58–60.
- Gregory, John (1878). Centennial Proceedings and Historical Incidents of the Early Settlers of Northfield, VT. Montpelier, VT: Argus and Patriot Book and Job Printing House. pp. 92–93.
- White, James T. (1922). The National Cyclopaedia of American Biography. Vol. 18. New York, NY: James T. White & Company. p. 327.

=== Newspapers ===
- "Northfield: Funeral Services Over the Remains of the late Hon. George Nichols". The Burlington Free Press. Burlington, VT. May 2, 1907. p. 5.

Political offices
Preceded by George W. Bailey Jr.	Vermont Secretary of State; 1865–1884	Succeeded by Charles W. Porter
