= George W. Bailey Jr. =

American politician (1833–1865)

George W. Bailey Jr. (April 6, 1833 – July 17, 1865) was a Vermont attorney and public official. He served for four years as Secretary of State of Vermont.

== Biography ==
George Washington Bailey Jr. was born in Elmore, Vermont on April 6, 1833; he was the son of George W. Bailey Sr. (1768-1868) and Rebecca Warren Bailey (1802-1885), and named for an older brother who was born in 1826 and died in 1831. The senior Bailey was a veteran of the War of 1812, and the longtime president of the Vermont Mutual Insurance Company. He also served as probate judge for Washington County and in other offices.

George Bailey Jr. studied law, and was admitted to the bar in 1858. He resided in Middlesex and practiced in Montpelier.

A Republican, Bailey served as Deputy Secretary of State while Benjamin W. Dean was Secretary of State. Dean died in July, 1861; Bailey served as acting secretary pending an election in October. In October, Bailey was elected to a full term. He won annual reelection three times, and served until his death.

== Death and burial ==
Bailey died of tuberculosis in Middlesex on July 17, 1865. He was buried at Green Mount Cemetery in Montpelier.

== Family ==
In 1862, Bailey married Georgiana Reed of Montpelier. After his death, she married E. Henry Powell, Vermont's longtime State Auditor.

== Sources ==
=== Internet ===
- "Vermont Vital Records, 1720-1908, Birth Record for George W. Bailey Jr". Ancestry.com. Ancestry.com, LLC.
- "Vermont Vital Records, 1720-1908, Marriage Record for George W. Bailey Jr. and Georgiana Reed". Ancestry.com. Ancestry.com, LLC.
- "Vermont Vital Records, 1720-1908, Death Record for George Washington Bailey Jr". Ancestry.com. Ancestry.com, LLC.

=== Books ===
- Album of Genealogy and Biography, Cook County, Illinois. Chicago, IL: Calumet Book & Engraving Co. 1896. p. 133.
- Carleton, Hiram (1903). Genealogical and Family History of the State of Vermont. Vol. 1. New York, NY: Lewis Publishing Company. p. 309.
- Child, Hamilton (1889). Gazetteer of Washington County, Vt., 1783-1889. Syracuse, NY: Syracuse Journal Company. p. 106.
- Vermont General Assembly (1860). Journal of the Senate of the State of Vermont. Montpelier, VT: E. P. Walton. p. 244.

=== Newspapers ===
- "Vermont Legislature: Secretary of State". Burlington Free Press. Burlington, VT. October 17, 1861. p. 2.
- "Deaths: Geo. W. Bailey Jr". St. Johnsbury Caledonian. St. Johnsbury, VT. July 21, 1865. p. 3.

Political offices
| Preceded by Benjamin W. Dean | Vermont Secretary of State; 1861–1865 | Succeeded by George Nichols |
