= USS Clark (DD-361) =

Porter-class destroyer

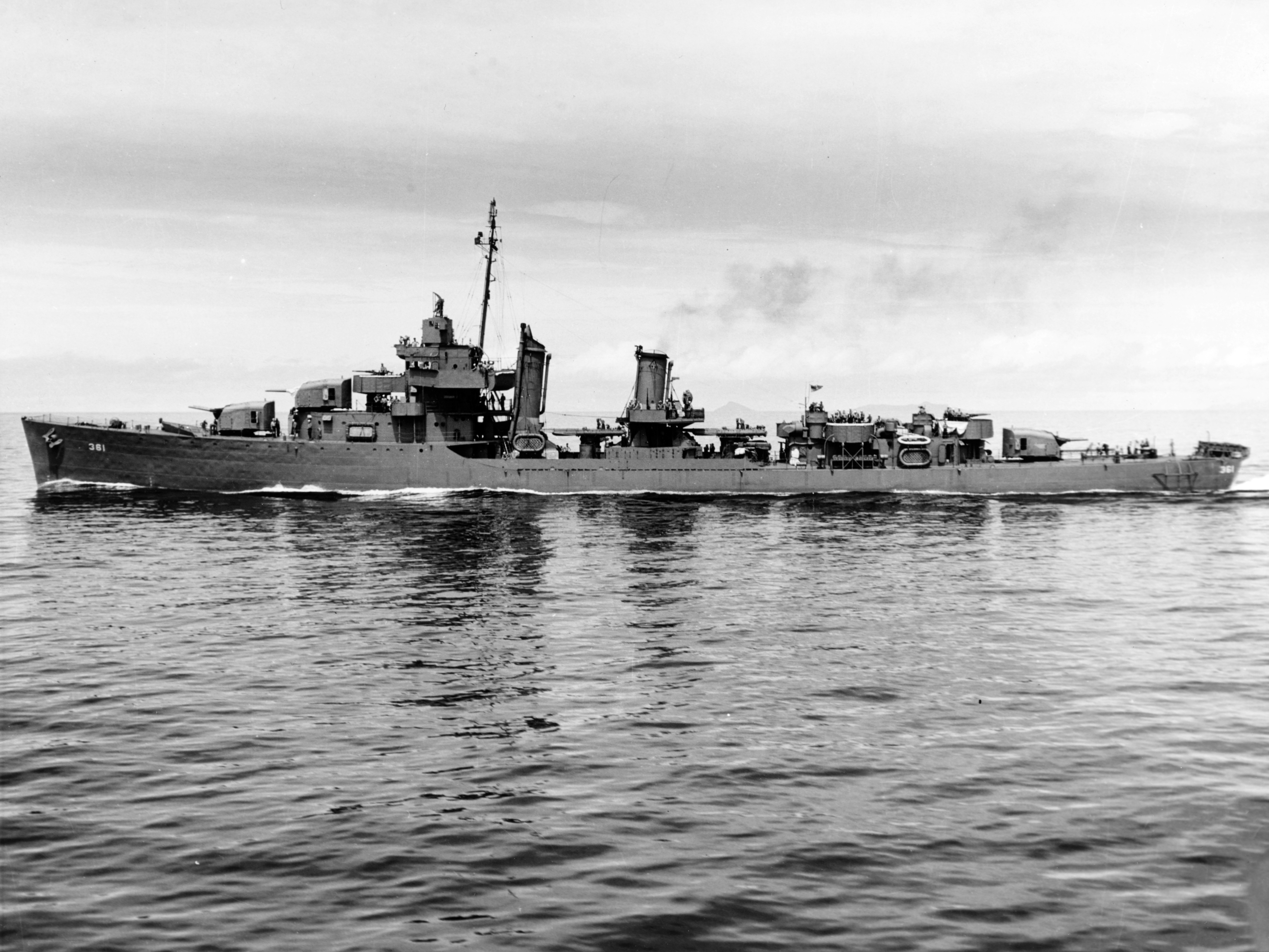
- USS Clark, 26 May 1943

History

United States
- Name: Clark (DD-361)
- Namesake: Charles E. Clark
- Builder: Bethlehem Shipbuilding Corporation's Fore River Shipyard, Quincy, Massachusetts
- Laid down: 2 January 1934
- Launched: 15 October 1935
- Commissioned: 20 May 1936
- Decommissioned: 23 October 1945
- Stricken: 16 November 1945
- Honours and awards: 2 × battle stars
- Fate: Scrapped 29 March 1946

General characteristics
- Class & type: Porter-class destroyer
- Displacement: 1,850 tons, 2,597 tons full
- Length: 381 ft (116 m)
- Beam: 36 ft (11 m)
- Draught: 10 ft (3.0 m)
- Propulsion: 50,000 shp (37,285 kW); Geared Turbines, 2 screws
- Speed: 35 knots (65 km/h)
- Range: 6,500 nm @ 12 knots (12,000 km@ 22 km/h)
- Complement: 194 officers and enlisted
- Armament: As built: 1 x Mk 33 Gun Fire Control System, 8 x 5" (127 mm)/38 cal SP (4x2), 8 x 1.1" (28 mm) AA (2x4), 8 x 21 inch (533 mm) torpedo tubes (2x4), 2 x Depth Charge Stern Racks; c1945: 1 x Mk 37 Gun Fire Control System, 6 x 5" (127 mm)/38 cal SP (3x2), 4 x Mk 51 Gun Directors, 12 x Bofors 40 mm guns (2x4,2x2), 6 x Oerlikon 20 mm cannons (6x1), 8 x 21" (533 mm) torpedo tubes (2x4), 2 x Depth Charge Stern Racks

The first USS Clark (DD-361) was a Porter-class destroyer in the United States Navy. She was named for Charles E. Clark.

Clark was launched 15 October 1935 by Bethlehem Shipbuilding Corporation's Fore River Shipyard, Quincy, Massachusetts; sponsored by Mrs. S. Robinson; and commissioned 20 May 1936, Commander H. Thebaud in command.

== Service history ==
Clark's prewar service included operations on the Atlantic coast, in the Caribbean, and from Pearl Harbor, her home port from 1 April 1940. From 3 March to 10 April 1941, she joined in a cruise to Samoa, Australia, and Fiji. At the outbreak of World War II, she lay in overhaul at San Diego, California. Clark departed the west coast 27 December, escorted two convoys to Pearl Harbor, then took up antisubmarine patrol off Pago Pago, Samoa, and in February and March 1942 joined a carrier task force for air raids on New Guinea

=== World War II ===
From April through May 1942, Clark escorted four convoys on their passage between Pearl Harbor and San Francisco, California, continuing to Midway on the last. She returned to San Diego and Balboa, where she joined the escort of a convoy bound for Wellington, New Zealand. Between 12 August and 8 September, she sailed out of Nouméa, New Caledonia, screening oilers fueling carrier task forces, and then returned to Auckland for a month of duty escorting convoys from New Zealand to South Pacific island bases. After a final month of local escort and patrol duty at Nouméa, Clark sailed 11 December 1942 to report at Balboa as flagship for Commander, Southeast Pacific Force.

Until 10 August 1944, Clark patrolled out of various South American ports, sailing then for an east coast overhaul. Between 4 September 1944 and 11 April 1945, she guarded the passage of six transatlantic convoys to ports in the United Kingdom and France.

On 15 June 1945, she arrived at Philadelphia, Pennsylvania, where she was decommissioned 23 October 1945 and scrapped 29 March 1946.

== Awards ==
Clark received two battle stars for World War II service.
