= Fisher A. Blocksom =

American politician (1782–1876)

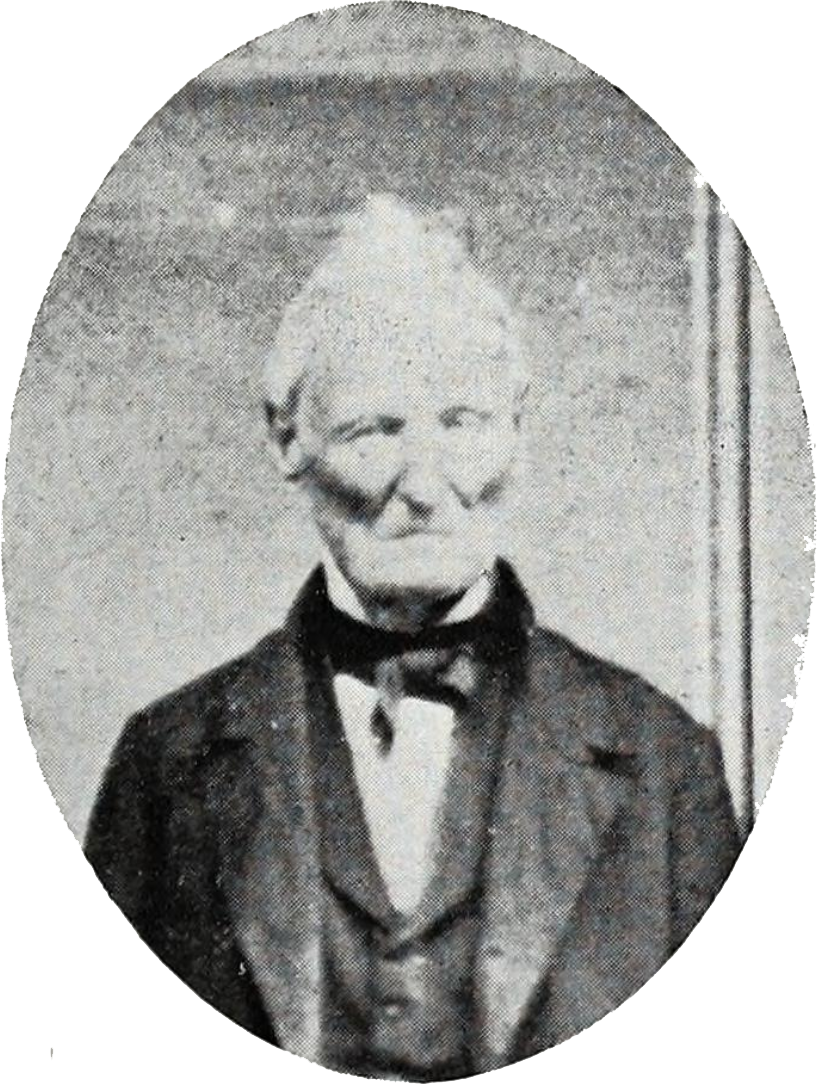
- Portrait of Blocksom in 1903 publication

Member of the Ohio Senate from the Columbiana and Mahoning counties district
- In office 1849–1851
- Preceded by: New district
- Succeeded by: District changed

Member of the Ohio Senate from the Columbiana County district
- In office 1847–1849
- Preceded by: John Martin
- Succeeded by: District changed

Member of the Ohio House of Representatives from the Columbiana County district
- In office 1831–1833 Serving with James Marshall, James Early, Robert Forbes, John Quinn
- Preceded by: James Early, James Marshall, Jacob Roller
- Succeeded by: Jacob Roller, Robert Forbes, John Quinn

Member of the Ohio House of Representatives from the Columbiana County district
- In office 1826–1828 Serving with John Hessin, De Lorma Brooks, Elderkin Potter, Robert Forbes
- Preceded by: William E. Russell, George Brown, Joab Gaskill
- Succeeded by: Elderkin Potter, James Early, Nathaniel Meyer

Personal details
- Born: September 11, 1782 Sussex County, Delaware Colony, British America
- Died: December 14, 1876 (aged 94) New Lisbon, Ohio, U.S.
- Party: Democratic
- Spouse: Margaret Graham
- Children: 6
- Occupation: Politician; lawyer

Fisher A. Blocksom (September 11, 1782 – December 14, 1876) was an American politician and lawyer from Ohio. He served as a member of the Ohio House of Representatives from 1826 to 1828 and from 1831 to 1833. He served as a member of the Ohio Senate from 1847 to 1851.

== Early life ==
Fisher A. Blocksom was born on September 11, 1782, in Sussex County, Delaware. He studied law under Mr. Finney of Wilmington, Delaware, in 1902. He worked with him for approximately a year. Blocksom then studied law under Mr. Boome of Wilmington. He was admitted to the bar in April 1805.

== Career ==
In May 1805, Blocksom came to New Lisbon, Ohio, and he was admitted to practice law in Columbiana County the same year. Blocksom worked as a prosecuting attorney in Columbiana County, for several years between 1805 and 1834. He was attorney of the Columbiana Bank of New Lisbon. From 1812 to 1813, Blocksom was deputy postmaster under Thomas Rowland and assumed postmaster duties while Rowland was in the U.S. Army.

In 1806, Blocksom was appointed as clerk to the staff of brigadier general Robert Simison, head of the fourth brigade of the second brigade of the first regiment of the Ohio militia. Blocksom was a member of Captain Daniel Harbaugh's light dragoon company during the War of 1812.

Blocksom was a Democrat. He served as a member of the Ohio House of Representatives, representing Columbiana County, from 1826 to 1828 and from 1831 to 1833. He then served as prosecuting attorney from 1838 to 1843. Blocksom served as a member of the Ohio Senate, representing Columbia County, from 1847 to 1849. He was a member of the Ohio Senate, representing Columbiana and Mahoning counties, from 1849 to 1851. He was a presidential elector for Ohio in 1832.

In 1846, Blocksom was treasurer of the Columbiana County Agricultural Society. He also served as president of the village council. Blocksom worked as a lawyer until around 1852. He was a member of the school board in New Lisbon.

== Personal life ==
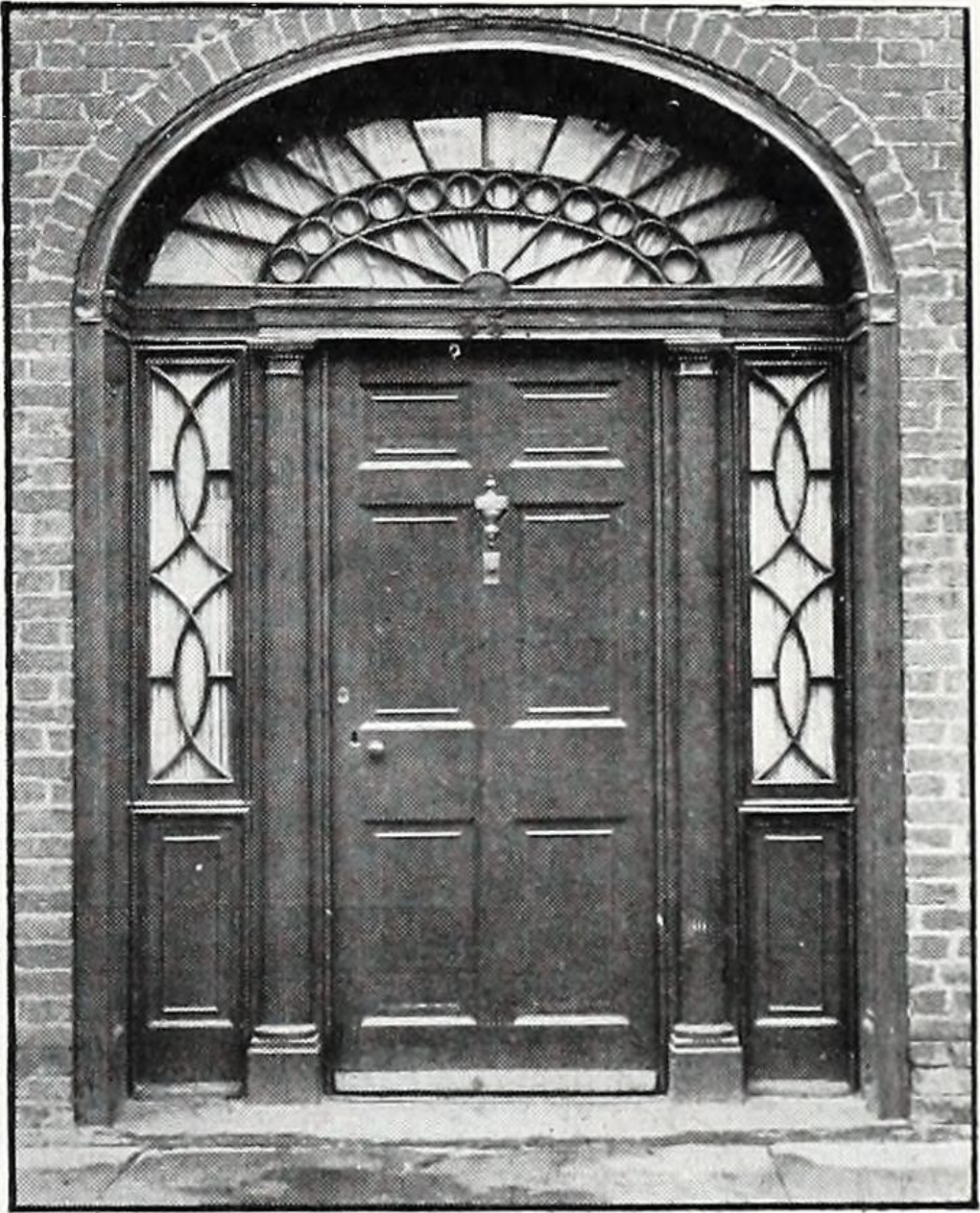
Doorway of Blocksom's home

Blocksom married Margaret Graham of Chambersburg, Pennsylvania. Blocksom had two daughters and four sons, including William, James, Jackson and Fisher. His son James (1821–1863) was justice of the peace and mayor of Canfield, Ohio.

He was a member of Trinity Chapel, a Protestant Episcopal church. In May 1863, he was elected senior warden of the church. He became a Mason around 1824. Blocksom died on December 14, 1876, in New Lisbon.
