= Benjamin W. Dean =

American politician (1827–1861)

Benjamin W. Dean (January 26, 1827 – July 6, 1861) was a Vermont attorney and politician. He served in the Vermont House of Representatives and as Secretary of State of Vermont.

== Biography ==
Benjamin Willey Dean was born in Manchester, Vermont on January 26, 1827, and was the son of Peter Werden Dean and Philinda (Willey) Dean. He attended Colby College, graduated from Dartmouth College in 1848, and received a master's degree from Dartmouth in 1851. Dean joined the Delta Kappa Epsilon fraternity while attending Colby. While at Dartmouth, he became a member of the Alpha Delta Phi fraternity.

Dean studied law with attorneys Abishai Stoddard of Grafton, and Charles J. Walker of Bellows Falls, and attended State and National Law School. He was admitted to the bar in 1852, and practiced in Elmira, New York before relocating to Vermont, where he practiced first in Bellows Falls, and then in Grafton.

An active participant in the Baptist church, Dean was a life member of the American Baptist Missionary Union.

A Republican, Dean served in local offices including register of probate for the Windham County district. In 1856 and 1857 he served in the Vermont House of Representatives. In 1857, Dean became Vermont's Secretary of State, and he served in this position until 1861.

== Death and burial ==
Dean died in Grafton on July 6, 1861. According to news reports, he had been ill with lung hemorrhages in the weeks before his death, but appeared to be recovering. He died after unexpected and severe hemorrhages left him unable to breathe.

== Family ==
In 1853, Dean married Fannie Angeline Cobb of South Windham. They were the parents of three daughters: Mary Emma (1853–1906), who was the wife of Chapin Howard (1852–1903); Harriet ("Hattie") (1856–1940), the wife of Dr. Arthur H. Tufts (1856–1931); and Lucy (1862–1942), the wife of Dr. Rollin E. Woodworth (1866–1932).

== Sources ==
=== Books ===
- Alpha Delta Phi Society (1865). Catalogue of the Alpha Delta Phi Society, 1832-1865. New York, NY: Alpha Delta Phi Society. p. 194.
- Chapman, George T. (1867). Sketches of the Alumni of Dartmouth College. Cambridge, MA: Riverside Press. pp. 372–373.
- Colby College (1920). General Catalogue of Officers, Graduates and Former Students of Colby College. Waterville, ME: Colby College. p. 256.
- Delta Kappa Epsilon Fraternity (1900). Catalogue of the Delta Kappa Epsilon Fraternity. New York, NY: Council Publishing Company. p. 55.
- Deming, Leonard (1851). Catalogue of the Principal Officers of Vermont. Middlebury, VT: Leonard Deming. p. 215.
- Hayes, Lyman Simpson (1907). History of the Town of Rockingham, Vermont. Bellows Falls, VT: Town of Rockingham, Vermont. p. 189.
- Johnston, Elizabeth Bryant (1897). Lineage Book, National Society, Daughters of the American Revolution. Vol. IV. Harrisburg, PA: Harrisburg Publishing Company. p. 219.
- Kingsbury, George Washington (1915). South Dakota: Its History and Its People. Vol. IV. Chicago, IL: S. J. Clarke Publishing Company. p. 775.
- Worden, O. N. (1868). Some Records of Persons by the Name of Worden. Lewisburg, PA: Railway Press. pp. 126–127.

=== Newspapers ===
- "Sudden Death of Benjamin W. Dean". St. Albans Transcript. St. Albans, VT. July 15, 1864. p. 3.
- "Dr. R. E. Woodworth, 66, Sanator Superintendent for Past 21 Years, Dies". The Argus-Leader. Sioux Falls, SD. October 11, 1932. p. 2.

=== Internet ===
- Hixon, Meg (June 1, 2012). "Biography, Mary Dean Howard". Mary Dean and Chapin Howard Family Collection. Ann Arbor, MI: William L. Clements Library, University of Michigan.

=== Magazines ===
- "Life Members of the Missionary Union". Baptist Missionary Magazine. Boston, MA: American Baptist Missionary Union. July 1, 1852. p. 310.

Political offices
Preceded by Charles W. Willard	Vermont Secretary of State; 1857–1861	Succeeded by George W. Bailey Jr.
