= Charles W. Willard =

American politician

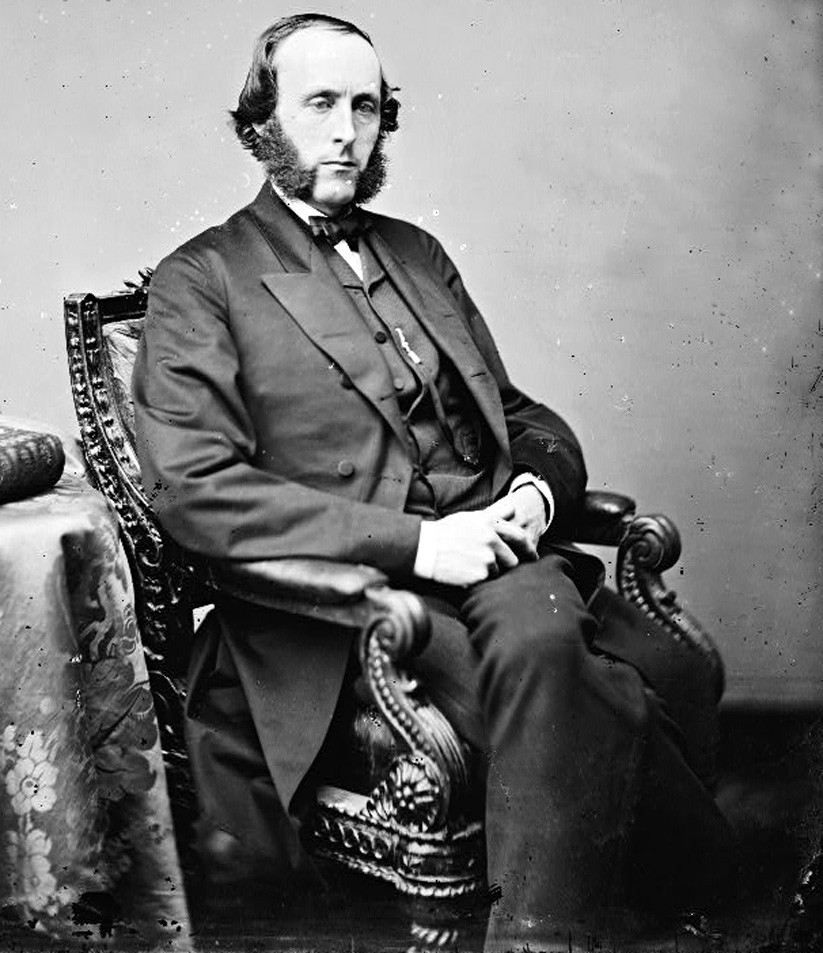

Member of the U.S. House of Representatives from Vermont's 1st district
- In office March 4, 1869 – March 3, 1875
- Preceded by: Frederick E. Woodbridge
- Succeeded by: Charles Herbert Joyce

Secretary of State of Vermont
- In office 1855–1857
- Governor: Stephen Royce
- Preceded by: Daniel Pierce Thompson
- Succeeded by: Benjamin W. Dean

Member of the Vermont Senate
- In office 1860–1861

Personal details
- Born: June 18, 1827 Lyndon, Vermont, U.S.
- Died: June 8, 1880 (aged 52) Montpelier, Vermont, U.S.
- Resting place: Green Mount Cemetery, Montpelier, Vermont
- Party: Republican
- Spouse: Emily Doane Reed
- Children: Mary Willard, Ashton R. Willard, Eliza M. Willard and Charles W. Willard
- Education: Dartmouth College
- Occupation: Lawyer, editor

Charles Wesley Willard (June 18, 1827 – June 8, 1880) was an American politician, lawyer, and newspaper editor. He served as a U.S. representative from Vermont.

== Biography ==
Willard was born in Lyndon, Vermont, son of Thomas Willard and Abigail (Carpenter) Willard. He attended Caledonia County Grammar School and graduated from Dartmouth College in Hanover, New Hampshire, in 1851. Willard studied law and was admitted to the bar in 1853. He began the practice of law in Montpelier. In 1855 and 1856 he was Secretary of State of Vermont. He declined reelection, then served as member of the Vermont State Senate in 1860 and 1861. He became editor and publisher of the Daily Green Mountain Freeman in 1861, and served in those positions until 1873.

Willard was elected as a Republican candidate to the 41st, 42nd, and 43rd United States Congresses, serving from March 4, 1869, until March 3, 1875. He served as chairman of the Committee on Revolutionary Pensions during the 41st and 42nd Congresses. He was an unsuccessful candidate for reelection in 1874 to the 44th Congress.

After leaving Congress, he resumed the practice of law in Montpelier and served as a member of the commission to revise the laws of Vermont in 1879 and 1880. Willard died on June 8, 1880, in Montpelier, and is interred in Green Mount Cemetery in Montpelier.

== Personal life ==
Willard married Emily Doane Reed on August 24, 1855. They had four children, Mary Willard, Ashton R. Willard, Eliza M. Willard and Charles W. Willard.

Political offices
Preceded by Daniel Pierce Thompson	Secretary of State of Vermont; 1855–1857	Succeeded by Benjamin W. Dean
U.S. House of Representatives
Preceded by Frederick E. Woodbridge	Member of the U.S. House of Representatives from Vermont's 1st congressional district March 4, 1869 – March 3, 1875	Succeeded by Charles H. Joyce
