= Charles W. Porter =

American politician (1849–1891)

20th Secretary of State of Vermont
- In office 1884–1890
- Governor: Samuel E. Pingree; William P. Dillingham
- Preceded by: George Nichols
- Succeeded by: Chauncey W. Brownell

Personal details
- Born: July 11, 1849 Hartford, Vermont, U.S.
- Died: August 1, 1891 (aged 42) New Bedford, Massachusetts
- Resting place: Green Mount Cemetery, Montpelier, Vermont
- Party: Republican
- Spouse: Florence B. Bailey (m. 1885–1891, his death)
- Education: Kimball Union Academy; Phillips Andover Academy
- Profession: Attorney

Charles W. Porter (July 11, 1849 – August 1, 1891) was an American attorney and public official who served as Secretary of State of Vermont.

== Biography ==
Charles Walcott Porter was born in Hartford, Vermont on July 11, 1849; he was the son of Judge John Porter (1798–1888) and Jane F. Foster (1811–1900). Porter was educated in Hartford, and then graduated from Kimball Union Academy in New Hampshire and Phillips Andover Academy in Massachusetts.

After completing his education, Porter moved to Montpelier, where he studied law with Benjamin F. Fifield, and was admitted to the bar. He practiced in partnership with Fifield and Clarence H. Pitkin; after Fifield retired, Pitkin and Porter practiced together until 1880, after which Porter carried on his own practice. From 1887 until his death, he was president of the Berlin Granite Company.

A Republican, Porter was Vermont's Deputy Secretary of State from 1872 to 1884. In 1884, longtime incumbent George Nichols retired, and Porter became Secretary of State. He served until 1890, when he was an unsuccessful candidate for renomination.

== Death and burial ==
Porter died at the home of his brother in law in New Bedford, Massachusetts on August 1, 1891. He had been ill for more than a year, and traveled extensively in an effort to restore his health. Physicians diagnosed him with malaria, though they were unable to determine how he had contracted it or when. He was buried at Green Mount Cemetery in Montpelier.

== Family ==
In 1885, Porter married Florence B. Bailey, the daughter of Charles W. and Olive E. Bailey of Montpelier.

== Sources ==
=== Books ===
- Ullery, Jacob G. (1894). Men of Vermont Illustrated. Brattleboro, VT: Transcript Publishing Company. pp. 322-323.

=== Newspapers ===
- "The State Convention". Vermont Phoenix. Brattleboro, VT. June 20, 1890. p. 2 – via Newspapers.com.
- "Obituary, Charles W. Porter". Boston Post. Boston, MA. August 3, 1891. p. 8 – via Newspapers.com.
- "C. W. Porter Dead". Burlington Free Press. Burlington, VT. August 3, 1891. p. 1 – via Newspapers.com.
- "Funeral of Hon. C. W. Porter". Vermont Watchman. Montpelier, VT. August 12, 1891. p. 4 – via Newspapers.com.

Party political offices
First	Republican nominee for Secretary of State of Vermont; 1884, 1886, 1888	Succeeded by Chauncey W. Brownell
Political offices
Preceded by George Nichols	Vermont Secretary of State; 1884–1890	Succeeded by Chauncey W. Brownell
