= John Spaulding (Vermont Treasurer) =

American businessman and politician

John Spaulding (January 16, 1790 – April 26, 1870) was a Montpelier, Vermont businessman who served as Vermont State Treasurer.

== Biography ==
John Spaulding was born in Sharon, Windsor County, Vermont on January 16, 1790, the son of Reuben Spaulding and Jerusha Carpenter. He was educated in Sharon, and moved to Montpelier in 1813 to begin a business career. He became a successful merchant, and was at various times a partner in the firms of Hubbard and Spaulding, Langdon & Spaulding, and John & Charles Spaulding.

Spaulding was a director of the Bank of Montpelier, and served as its president. In addition, he served as president of the Vermont Mutual Fire Insurance Company. Spaulding also served in local offices including selectman and justice of the peace.

A Whig, from 1840 to 1841 Spaulding served as assistant judge of Washington County. From 1841 to 1846 he served as Vermont State Treasurer.

Spaulding became a Republican when the party was founded in the mid-1850s, and was active in civic causes including the temperance movement. In 1867 Spaulding served again as assistant judge, accepting appointment from Governor Paul Dillingham to fill the vacancy caused by the death of Alpheus Bass.

Spaulding died in Montpelier on April 26, 1870. He was buried at Green Mount Cemetery in Montpelier.

== Family ==
In 1814 Spaulding married Sarah (Sally) Collins (1793-1874), a daughter of Salvin Collins of Montpelier. They were the parents of two sons and three daughters: Maria Wilder (1816–1874); Ann Eliza (1818–1900); Charles Carroll (1826–1877); Sarah Rebecca (1828–1843); and John (1830–1882).

Maria Wilder Spaulding was the wife of Charles Lyman (1808-1888), who was for several years the head of the dead letter office at the United States Post Office Department.

== Other ==
Spaulding's last name sometimes appears in as "Spalding".

== Legacy ==
Spaulding’s Montpelier home at 99 State Street still stands and is the location of several business offices. It is part of the Montpelier Historic District, which is included on the National Register of Historic Places.

Party political offices
Preceded by Henry Fisk Janes	Whig nominee for Vermont State Treasurer; 1841, 1842, 1843, 1844, 1845	Succeeded by Elisha P. Jewett
Political offices
Preceded by Henry Fisk Janes	Vermont State Treasurer; 1841–1846	Succeeded by Elisha P. Jewett
