= Dayton P. Clarke =

American soldier (1840–1915)

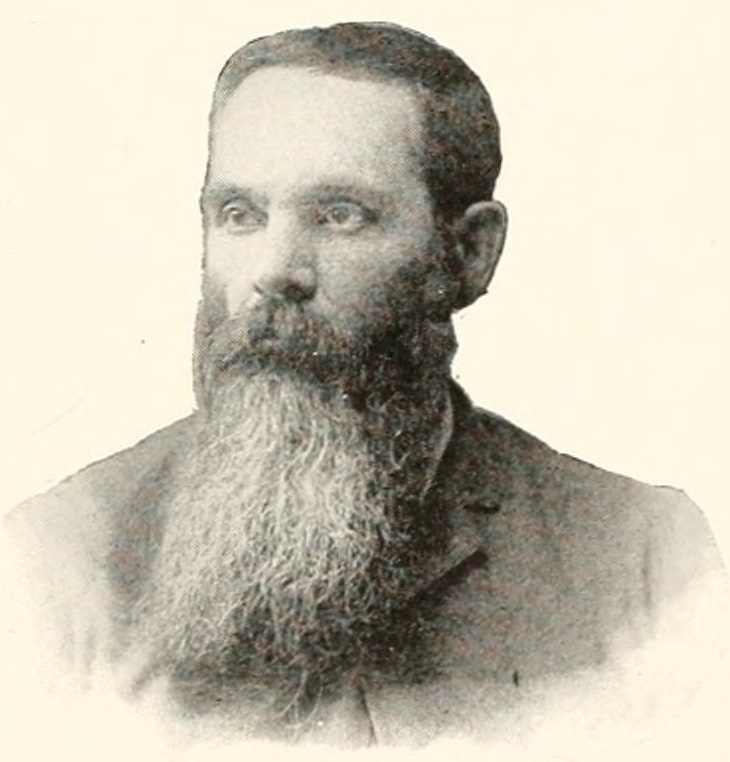
- From 1905's Richard Clarke of Rowley, Massachusetts, and his descendants in the line of Timothy Clark of Rockingham, Vt. 1638-1904
- Born: December 15, 1840; Hermon, New York, U.S.
- Died: November 10, 1915 (aged 74); Montpelier, Vermont, U.S.
- Burial place: Green Mount Cemetery, Montpelier, Vermont
- Military career
- Allegiance: United States of America
- Branch: United States Army
- Rank: Captain
- Unit: 2nd Regiment Vermont Volunteer Infantry - Company F
- Awards: Medal of Honor

Captain Dayton P. Clarke (December 15, 1840 to November 10, 1915) was an American soldier who fought in the American Civil War. Clarke received the country's highest award for bravery during combat, the Medal of Honor, for his action during the Battle of Spotsylvania Court House in Virginia on 12 May 1864. He was honored with the award on 30 June 1892.

== Biography ==
Dayton Perry Clarke (sometimes spelled Clark) was born in Hermon, New York on 15 December 1840. He enlisted into the 2nd Vermont. He died on 10 November 1915 and his remains are interred at Green Mount Cemetery in Montpelier.

== Medal of Honor citation ==
Distinguished conduct in a desperate hand-to-hand fight while commanding the regiment.

== See also ==
- List of American Civil War Medal of Honor recipients: A–F
