= John W. Clark (Medal of Honor) =

American soldier (1830–1898)

John Wesley Clark
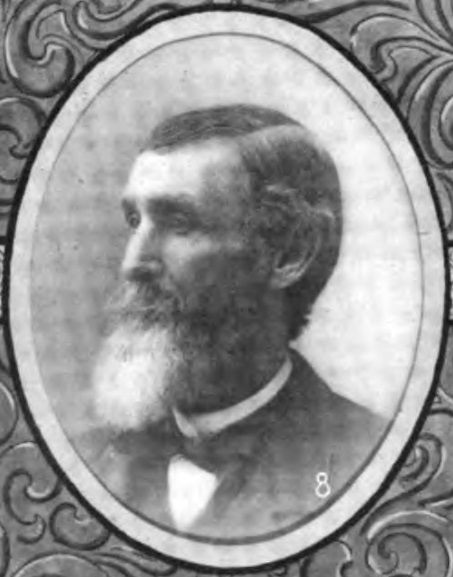
- From Volume II of 1902's Deeds of Valor: How America's Heroes Won the Medal of Honor
- Born: October 25, 1830; Moretown, Vermont
- Died: August 4, 1898 (aged 67); Montpelier, Vermont
- Burial place: Green Mount Cemetery, Montpelier, Vermont
- Military career
- Allegiance: United States of America
- Branch: United States Army
- Service years: 1861 - 1864
- Rank: Captain
- Unit: 6th Regiment Vermont Volunteer Infantry
- Conflicts: American Civil War
- Awards: Medal of Honor

John Wesley Clark (October 25, 1830 – August 4, 1898) was an American soldier who fought in the American Civil War. Clark received the country's highest award for bravery during combat, the Medal of Honor, for his action near Warrenton in Virginia on 28 July 1863. He was honored with the award on 21 December 1892.

== Biography ==
Clark was born in Moretown, Vermont on 25 October 1830. He was appointed as regimental quartermaster (with rank of first lieutenant) of the 6th Vermont Infantry in September 1861. He was promoted to captain in April 1864, and resigned from the army by the end of the year. Clark died on 4 August 1898 and his remains are interred at Green Mount Cemetery in Montpelier, Vermont.

== Medal of Honor citation ==
Defended the division train against a vastly superior force of the enemy; he was severely wounded, but remained in the saddle for 20 hours afterward until he had brought his train through in safety.

== See also ==
- List of American Civil War Medal of Honor recipients: A–F
