= George Howes (Vermont Treasurer) =

American politician

George Howes (November 14, 1814 – January 30, 1892) was a Montpelier, Vermont businessman and political figure who served as Vermont State Treasurer.

== Biography ==
George Howes was born in Montpelier, Vermont on November 14, 1814, the son of Martha and Joseph Howes (d. 1863). He was educated in Montpelier, and in 1834 began a business career as a merchant in partnership with Elisha P. Jewett. In addition, he served in local offices including justice of the peace.

In 1841 Howes began a banking career as cashier of the Bank of Montpelier (later the Montpelier National Bank), a post he held until 1858.

Howes was the successful Whig nominee for State Treasurer in 1847, succeeding Jewett. Howes served until 1853.

In 1858 Howes moved to Saint Paul, Minnesota, where he launched a successful career in real estate. He returned to Montpelier in 1868, where he lived in semi-retirement while managing his financial and real estate investments. In addition, he served for several years as Vermont's federal agent for paying pensions to eligible Union veterans of the American Civil War.

Howes died in Montpelier on January 30, 1892. He was buried at Green Mount Cemetery in Montpelier.

== Family ==
In 1871 Howes married Helen Holmes Anderson, the daughter of Edwin C. Holmes and Priscille A. Riker Holmes of Montpelier.

Party political offices
Preceded by Elisha P. Jewett	Whig nominee for Vermont State Treasurer; 1847, 1848, 1849, 1850, 1851, 1852, 1853	Succeeded by None
Political offices
Preceded by Elisha P. Jewett	Vermont State Treasurer; 1847–1853	Succeeded by John A. Page
