= College Hall (Montpelier, Vermont) =

- U.S. National Register of Historic Places
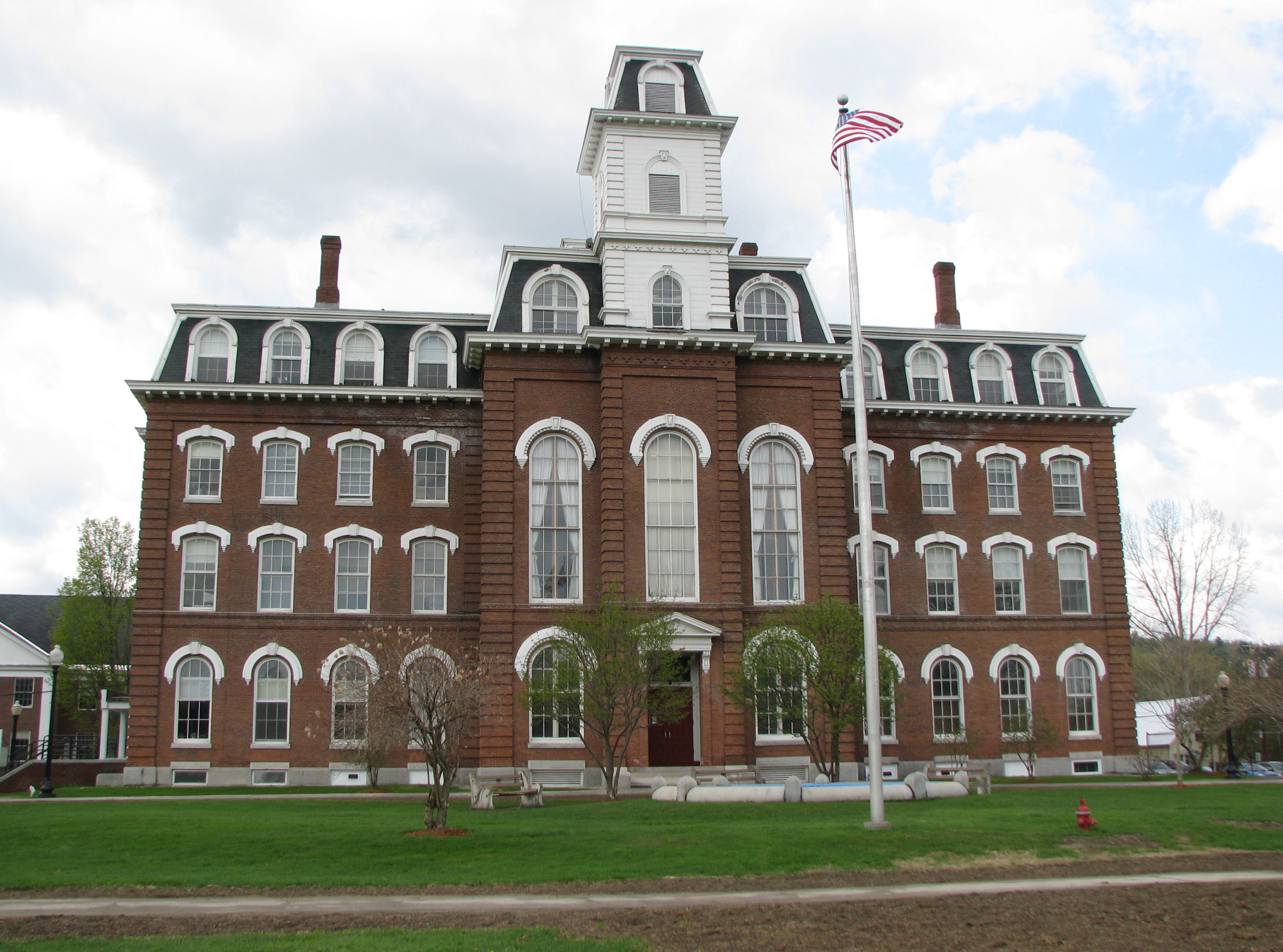
- College Hall in 2008

- Location within Vermont Location within the United States
- Location: Vermont College of Fine Arts campus, Ridge St., Montpelier, Vermont
- Coordinates: 44°15′19″N 72°34′4″W
- Area: 4.5 acres (1.8 ha)
- Built: 1868
- Architectural style: Second Empire
- NRHP reference No.: 75000146
- Added to NRHP: April 23, 1975

College Hall is the central building of the campus of the Vermont College of Fine Arts in Montpelier, U.S. state of Vermont. Located prominently on Ridge Street atop Seminary Hill, this 1872 Second Empire building has been a major visual and architectural landmark in the city since its construction. It was listed on the National Register of Historic Places for its architectural significance in 1975.

== Description and history ==
College Hall is located near the top of a hill east of downtown Montpelier, that was given the name Seminary Hill after the Vermont Methodist Conference established the campus of its seminary there in 1866. The site was chosen because of its proximity to railroad service, and to the state's center of government; it had previously housed a military hospital during the American Civil War. College Hall was built between 1868 and 1872 at a cost of $50,000, and has been in educational use ever since. It was operated exclusively as the Vermont Seminary until 1936, when Vermont Junior College was given space in the seminary facilities. The seminary closed its doors in 1947. Vermont Junior College was reorganized as Vermont College in 1958 and merged into Norwich University in 1972. The university used the campus to establish a fine arts program, which was later sold to the Union Institute in 2001. The Vermont College of Fine Arts was established in 2008.

College Hall is a cruciform masonry building, built out of load-bearing brick walls set on a foundation of rubblestone faced in cut granite. It is four stories in height, covered with a mansard roof. The long street-facing facade is eleven bays wide, with the central three projecting. The projecting section has round-arch windows, including two-story windows in the second and third floors, where the chapel is located. The flanking wings have round-arch windows in the first floor and the mansarded fourth floor, with segmented-arch windows on the second and third levels. The entrance is in the center bay, which projects slightly further, and is topped by a tower rising five stories, also with a mansard roof. The building corners have brick quoining, and there is a beltcourse of brickwork above the first floor. The roof eaves are studded with modillions.

== See also ==
- National Register of Historic Places listings in Washington County, Vermont
