= Thomas Waterman Wood =

American painter

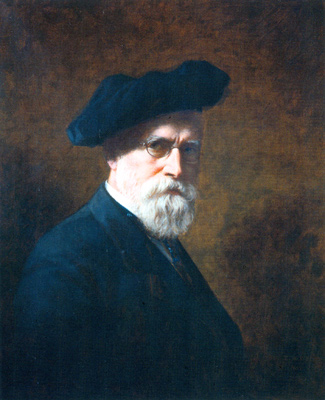
- Self-portrait, 1884
- Born: November 12, 1823; Montpelier, Vermont, U.S.
- Died: April 14, 1903 (aged 79); New York City, U.S.
- Resting place: Green Mount Cemetery, Montpelier, Vermont
- Known for: Painting

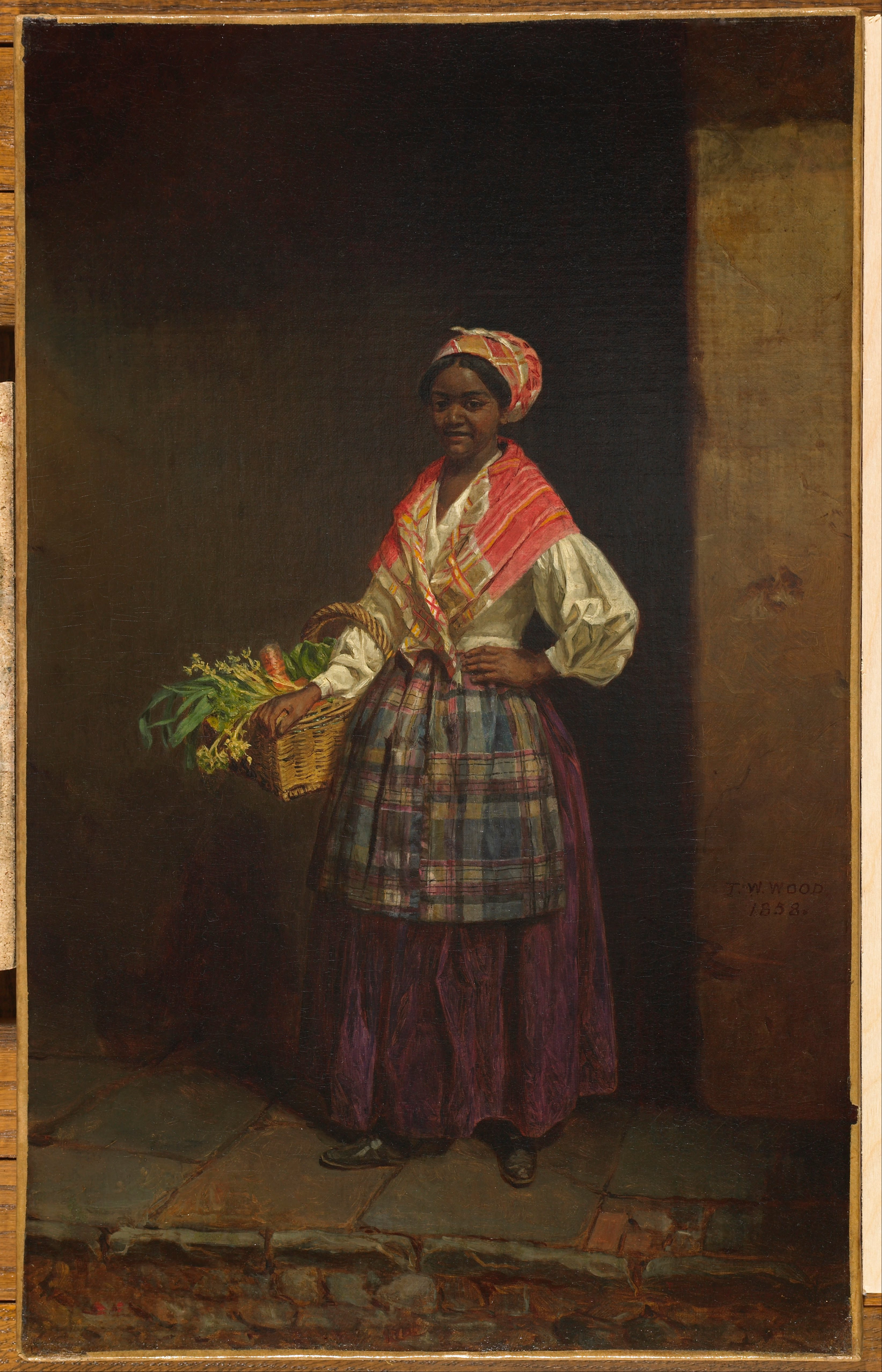
Market Woman

Thomas Waterman Wood (November 12, 1823 – April 14, 1903) was an American painter born in Montpelier, Vermont.

== Early life and education ==
Thomas Waterman Wood's father, John Wood, came to Montpelier from Lebanon, New Hampshire in 1814. The Wood family was of Puritan descent, and it was from Lebanon that John Wood, the father of the artist, married his wife Mary Waterman.

John Wood and his brother Cyrus were partners in a cabinet making business, the partnership concluding with the death of Cyrus in 1840. John's other brother, Zenas, lived to be 84 years of age. John Wood was the captain of an artillery company and for a long time, a deacon in the First Congregational Church.

== Career ==
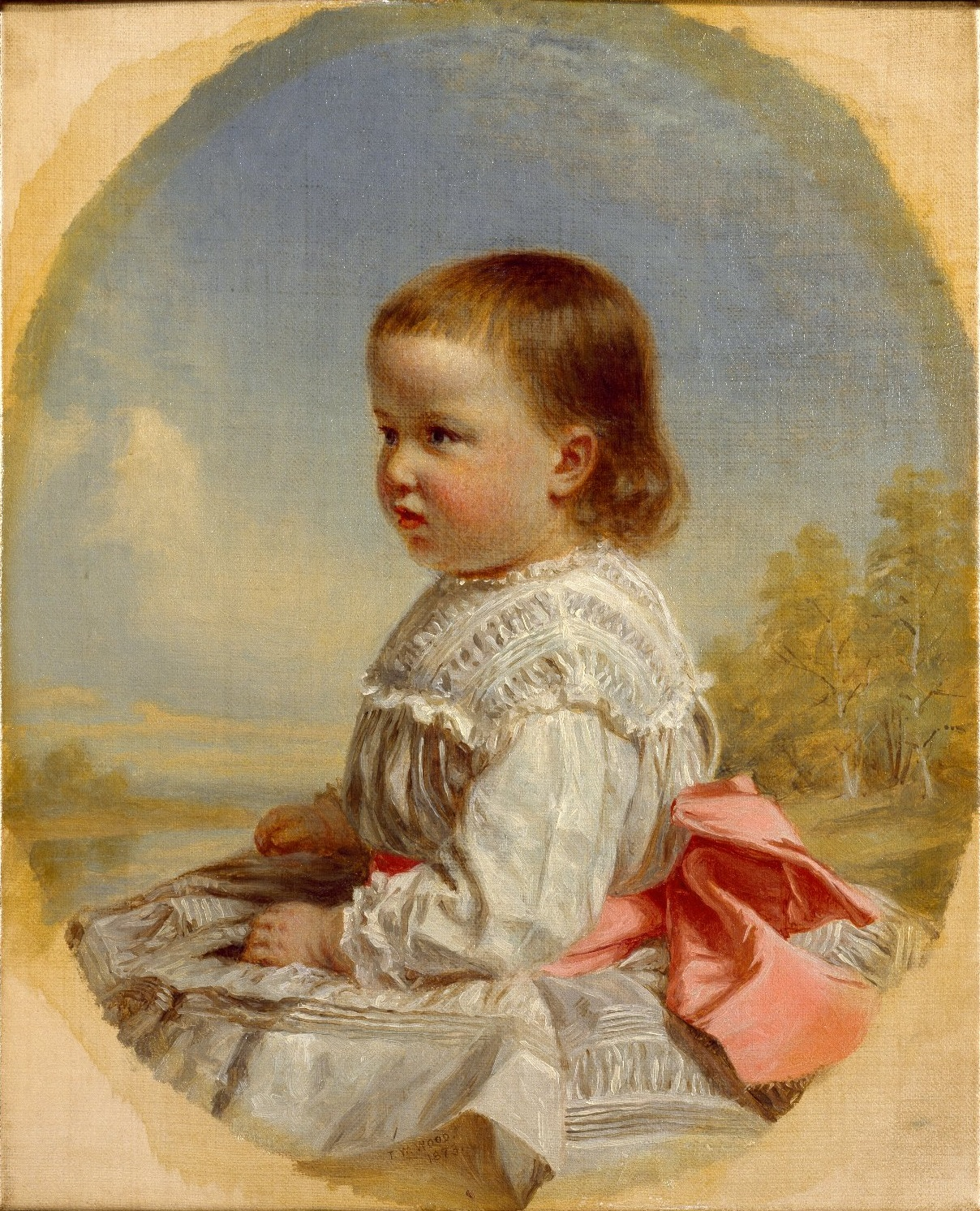
Susie Kent Southwick - Brooklyn Museum

When fortune permitted, Wood went to Boston and studied for a short time in the studio of Chester Harding, a portrait painter. In 1850 he married Miss Minerva Robinson, then living in Waterbury, Vermont, and in the same year he built a summer home in the Carpenter Gothic style on the west side of the mountain gorge through which the road leads up to Northfield. He named this home after his wife, making use of the Latin synonym, Athenwood.

During the 1850s, he found means of visiting galleries in London, Paris, Rome and Florence, having previously painted portraits in Canada, Washington and Baltimore. His first European visit, in 1858, was shared with Mrs. Wood. Upon their return he painted portraits in Nashville and Louisville, beginning at the former place The Fiddler, which was completed years afterwards and finally included in the Thomas W. Wood Collection in the Montpelier gallery.

At the age of 43, the artist permanently settled himself in New York City, opening a studio as a figure painter. This was in 1866, eight years after the exhibition of his first work in the National Academy of Design, The Baltimore Newsvendor (1858). This painting was sold by mistake to two persons, Mr. J. C. Brune of Baltimore and Mr. Robert L. Stuart of New York, resulting in a long, expensive lawsuit, terminated in favor of Mr. Brune.

During his residence in Louisville, Wood painted The Contraband, Recruit and Veteran, suggested by the sight of a black man in light brown jeans, who had but one leg and was hobbling along on home-made crutches. This celebrated work commemorates the transition of the African American from slavery to freedom and is now the property of The Metropolitan Museum of Art.

In 1869, Wood was elected an Associate of the National Academy of Design and, in 1871, an Academician. He became President of the American Water Color Society in 1878 and served in that office until 1887. He acted as vice-president of the National Academy of Design for a period of twelve years beginning in 1879. In 1891 he became the President of the academy. He died in New York City and was buried at Green Mount Cemetery in Montpelier.

=== Art ===
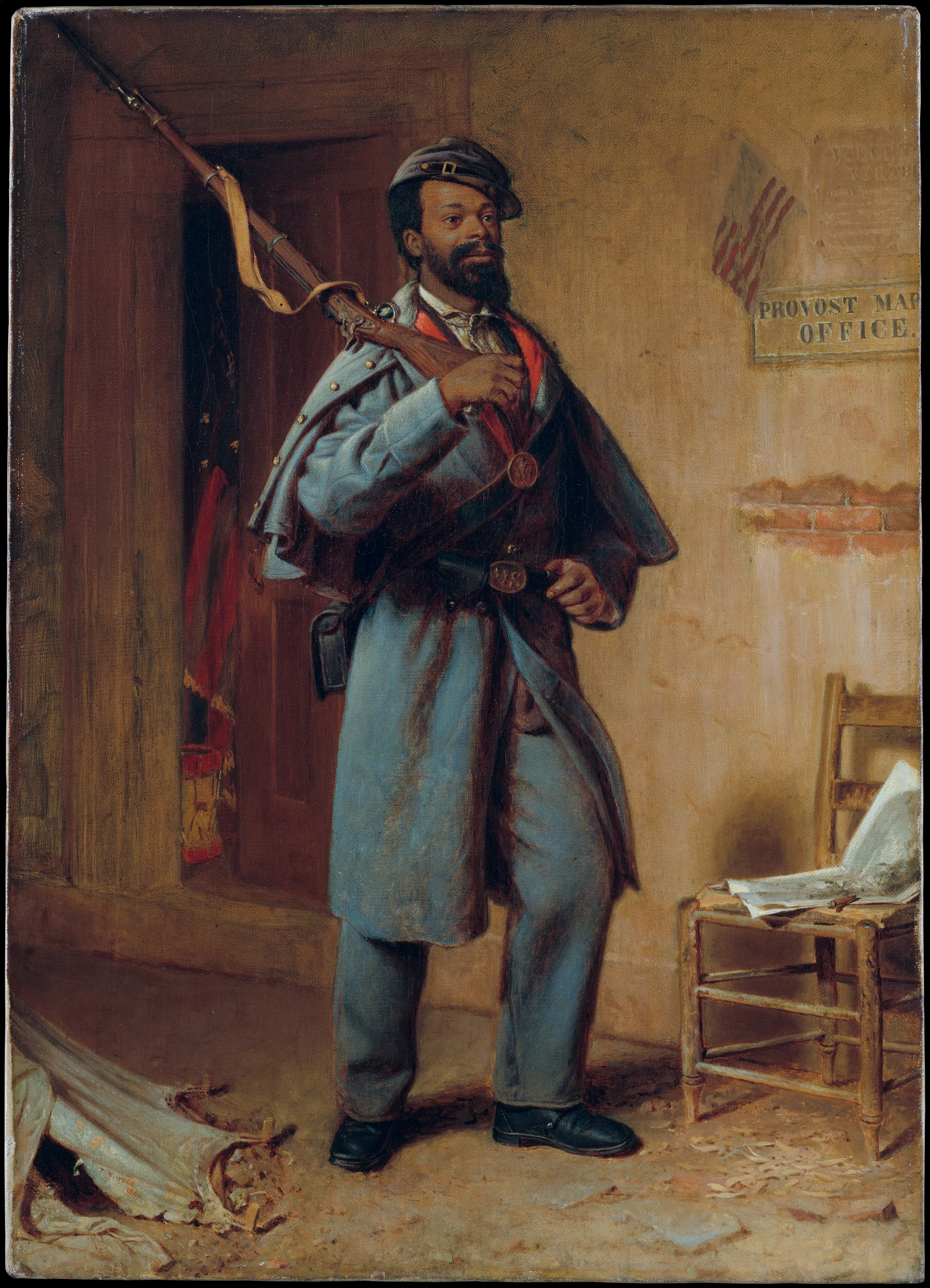
A Bit of War History- The Recruit, Thomas Waterman Wood, Metropolitan Museum of Art

In 1891, Wood exhibited at the academy a picture entitled A Cogitation, for which one of his Montpelier friends, Mr. George Ripley, posed. The composition is extremely simple, a farmer in his barn, leaning upon his pitchfork, his countenance thoughtful. This picture was bought by Mr. Harper and published as a full-page engraving in Harper's Weekly during the Greeley campaign over the title "Is Greeley a Fool or a Knave?".

The subjects of his works, his selection of characters, his yearly pilgrimage to Vermont, all demonstrate his filial loyalty and he gave to this sentiment of his heart its final expression in the establishment, as a gift to Montpelier, of its Gallery of Art. But, apart from this, the homes, offices and institutions of Montpelier and without are filled with the affectionate and great evidences of his work. The Vermont Historical Society possesses several excellent examples of his portraiture, all of great historic value and preserved in the Cedar Creek Reception Room at the Vermont State House: Samuel Prentiss (1881), United States Senator; Mrs. Samuel Prentiss (1895) and Dr. Edward Lamb (1895), gifts to the Society by the family of Mr. Prentiss. In 1896, the Society unveiled a life-size portrait of the distinguished publicist, the Hon. E. P. Walton, the gift of his wife and sister. Wood's personal donations include portraits of the Rev. William A. Lord, D.D. (1874), minister of Bethany Congregational Church of this city, Daniel Pierce Thompson (1880), novelist and author of "The Green Mountain Boys", and Justin S. Morrill, United States Senator, father of tariff legislation, promoter of agricultural colleges and chief up builder of the Library of Congress.
