= Daniel Pierce Thompson =

American novelist (1795–1868)

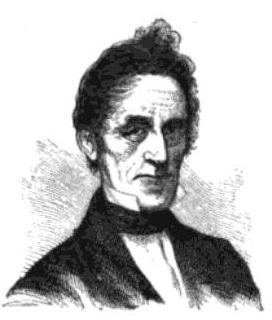
- From Volume II (1856) of Cyclopaedia of American Literature

15th Secretary of State of Vermont
- In office 1853–1855
- Preceded by: Ferrand F. Merrill
- Succeeded by: Charles W. Willard

Probate Judge of Washington County, Vermont
- In office 1841–1842
- Preceded by: George Worthington
- Succeeded by: Azel Spaulding
- In office 1837–1840
- Preceded by: Jason Carpenter
- Succeeded by: George Worthington

Personal details
- Born: October 1, 1795 Charlestown, Massachusetts, U.S.
- Died: June 6, 1868 (aged 72) Montpelier, Vermont, U.S.
- Resting place: Green Mount Cemetery, Montpelier, Vermont
- Party: Republican (from 1856)
- Other political affiliations: Democratic; Liberty; Whig
- Spouse: Eunice Knight Robinson (m. 1831–1868, his death)
- Children: 6
- Relatives: William O. Douglas (Great-grandnephew)
- Education: Middlebury College
- Profession: Attorney; Politician; Author

Daniel Pierce Thompson (October 1, 1795 – June 6, 1868) was an American writer and lawyer who served as Vermont Secretary of State and was New England's most famous novelist prior to Nathaniel Hawthorne.

== Early life ==
Daniel P. Thompson was born in Charlestown, Massachusetts on October 1, 1795 and moved to Vermont with his family in 1800. He was raised in Berlin, Vermont, and graduated from Middlebury College in 1820. He then moved to Virginia, where he taught school, studied law, and attained admission to the bar before returning to Vermont to become an attorney in Montpelier.

== Legal and political career ==
Thompson was Washington County Register of Probate from 1825 to 1830, and Engrossing Clerk of the Vermont House of Representatives from 1830 to 1833 and 1834 to 1836.

Thompson was active in the Democratic Party before moving to the Liberty Party and becoming involved in the abolition movement. From 1849 to 1856 he edited the anti-slavery Green Mountain Freeman newspaper.

He was Washington County Probate Judge from 1837 to 1840 and again from 1841 to 1842, and he compiled 1835's Laws of Vermont. In 1838 he was a founder of the Vermont Historical Society.

He served as Washington County Clerk from 1844 to 1846. From 1853 to 1855 he was Vermont Secretary of State.

After having been affiliated with the Whig Party, he joined the Republican Party at its founding in the 1850s.

== Career as author ==
Influenced by James Fenimore Cooper and Walter Scott, he wrote historical adventure and romance novels, many of which feature life in Vermont.

In 1835 he authored May Martin, or the Money Diggers. Its favorable reception established his popularity, and he specialized in Vermont during the Colonial and Revolutionary War eras.

His writings include a satirizing of Anti-Masonry, The Adventures of Timothy Peacock (1835); The Green Mountain Boys (1840); Locke Amsden, or the Schoolmaster (1845); The Shaker Lovers, and Other Tales (1848); Lucy Hosmer, or the Guardian and the Ghost (1849); The Rangers, or the Tory's Daughter (1850); The Tales of the Green Mountains (1852); Gaut Gurley, a Tale of the Umbagog (1857); The Doomed Chief, or King Philip (1860); and Centeola (1864).

Thompson also authored 1859's History of the Town of Montpelier.

New England's most famous novelist of the 1840s and 1850s, Thompson's work was responsible for imprinting the story of Ethan Allen and the Green Mountain Boys in the public's consciousness. His ability to tell action and adventure stories plainly and quickly made his novels popular well into the 1900s, and many of his books are still in print.

== Death and burial ==
Thompson died in Montpelier on June 6, 1868. He was buried at Green Mount Cemetery in Montpelier.

== Family ==
He and Eunice Knight Robinson of Troy, Vermont married in 1831 and they had five children—George Robinson (1834–1871); Alma (1837–1883), the wife of George B. Burrows; William P. (1839–1873); Frances (1842–1858); and Greenleaf (1850–1897); and Charles Sumner (1851–1852).

Thompson was a great-grand-uncle of U.S. Supreme Court Justice William O. Douglas.

Party political offices
Preceded by Joseph Poland	Free Soil nominee for Vermont State Treasurer; 1851, 1852, 1853	Succeeded by None
Political offices
Preceded by Ferrand F. Merrill	Secretary of State of Vermont; 1853–1855	Succeeded by Charles W. Willard
