= Charles Edgar Clark =

United States Navy admiral (1843–1922)

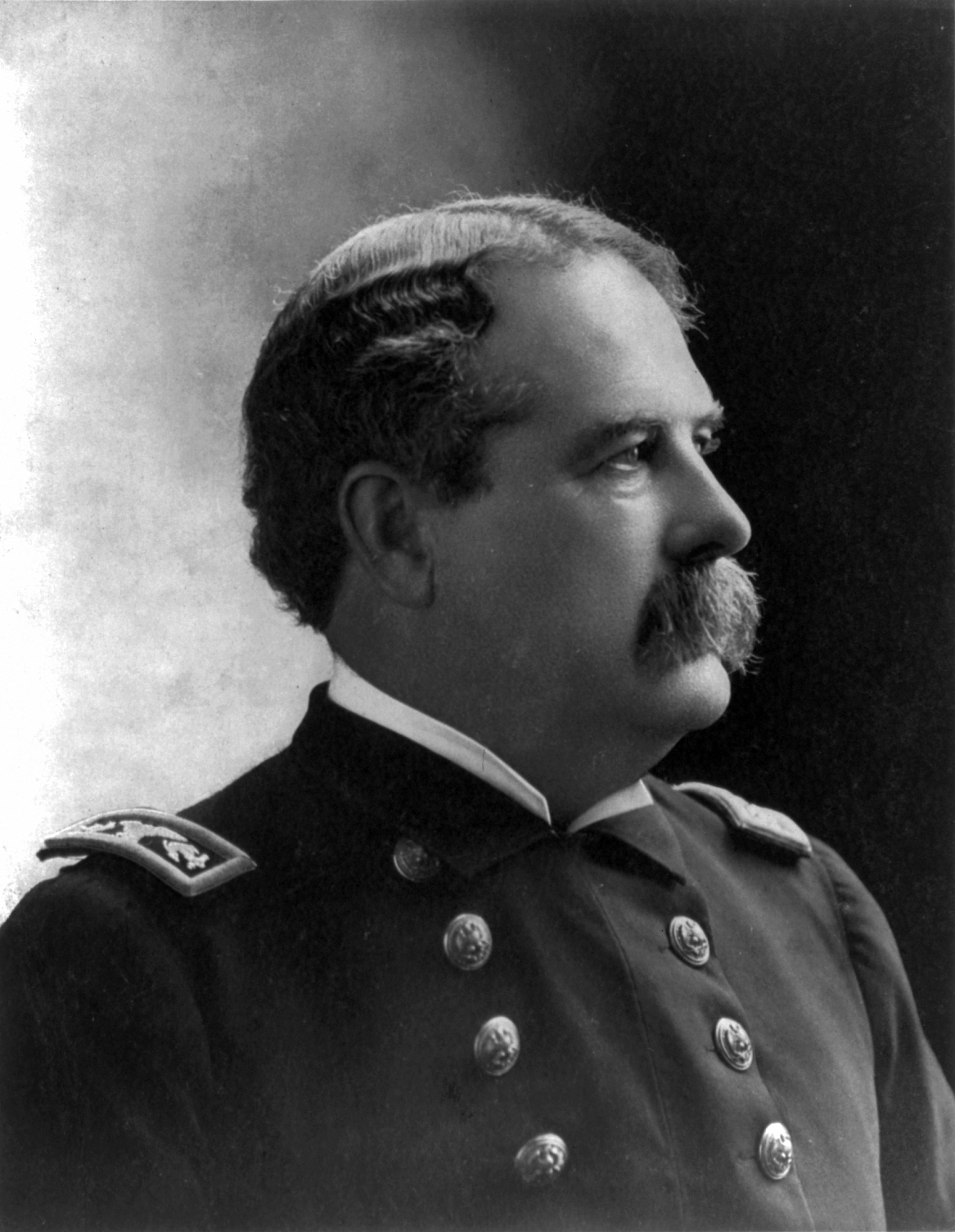
- Clark in 1899
- Born: August 10, 1843; Bradford, Vermont, US
- Died: October 1, 1922 (aged 79); Long Beach, California, US
- Military career
- Allegiance: United States
- Branch: United States Navy
- Service years: 1863–1905
- Rank: Rear admiral
- Commands: Ossipee; Oregon
- Conflicts: American Civil War • Battle of Mobile Bay; Spanish–American War • Battle of Santiago de Cuba

Rear Admiral Charles Edgar Clark (August 10, 1843 – October 1, 1922) was an officer in the United States Navy during the American Civil War and the Spanish–American War.

== Early life ==
Clark was born in Bradford, Vermont on August 10, 1843, to James Dayton Clark and Mary Sexton Clark. His earlier education was largely composed of his attendance to Bradford Academy. From a young age, Clark was an avid reader and especially fond of military history. He was inspired by historical military figures such as Hannibal, Napoleon, Marlborough, and many more generals, and expressed interest in attending military school around age sixteen. His father (James Dayton Clark) was acquaintanced with the Honorable Justin S. Morrill, and wrote to him asking for an appointment for Charles to the Military Academy. While he was denied at West Point on account of there being no vacancies, Morrill offered Clark a spot at the Naval Academy, which he accepted.

== Time at the Naval Academy ==
Clark travelled to the Naval Academy in Annapolis and arrived there on September 29, 1860. He first reported to the superintendent of the Naval Academy, Captain George S. Blake, and began working on the ship Constitution, or “Old Ironsides”, with C. R. P. Rodgers, Edward Simpson, Stephen B. Luce, and Lieutenants Flusser, John Taylor Wood, Hunter Davidson, and William H. Parker.

Rumors of war influenced a rising unrest at the Academy, and students' desire to leave school to be part of a fight was stronger than ever. Clark's first practice cruise was during the summer of 1862. It took place in the USS John Adams (1799) under the supervision of Commander Edward Simpson. During this trip, their crew ventured up the Peninsula near the Fortress Monroe, and then to Yorktown, Long Island, and New Haven. His second practice cruise was a summer later, in 1863. The crew served under Commander Steven B. Luce on the corvette Macedonian. This trip ventured across the North Atlantic to New England, Plymouth, and Spithead. It was there that Clark and the other students visited the Arsenal at Woolwich, where they saw weapons like triphammers. They spent time in France and New York, where they were towed into Long Island Sound by the steamer Freeborn shortly before she sank. Clark and the crew of the Macedonian rescued the other sailors and continued on their way.

== Naval career ==
Clark graduated from the Naval Academy in 1863. He commanded the Bermuda for the passage to the Philadelphia Navy Yard, where he then reported to the screw sloop USS Ossipee (1861). He stayed on the Ossipee (which was under the command of John P. Gillis) for the Battle of Mobile Bay and in the bombardment of Fort Morgan, which was all of his Civil War service. Clark was promoted to captain in 1896.

In March 1898, he took command of the battleship USS Oregon (BB-3) at the Mare Island Naval Shipyard, San Francisco. When war with Spain was deemed inevitable, he received orders to proceed to Key West, Florida, with all haste. The Oregon, her crew, and Clark sailed from San Francisco on March 19. After a most remarkable voyage of over 14,000 miles, around Cape Horn, he joined the American fleet in Cuban waters on May 26. The voyage of the Oregon was hailed a remarkable achievement in its day, and pointed to the need for the Panama Canal to reduce travel time between the east and west coasts of the United States.

On May 27, his crew was increased by sixty sailors. With a squadron of other ships; Brooklyn, Massachusetts, Iowa, Texas, Marblehead, and New Orleans, they set up a blockade intended to last until July. On July 3, the USS Oregon, captained by Clark, led the chase resulting in the destruction of Cervera's squadron. For this high accomplishment, he was advanced in seniority, and was appointed Rear Admiral 16 June 1902.

Clark retired from the Navy upon reaching the mandatory retirement age of 62 in 1905.

== Later life and legacy ==
Admiral Clark was a Veteran Companion of the Vermont Commandery of the Military Order of the Loyal Legion of the United States. In 1898 he became a Veteran Companion of the Pennsylvania Commandery of the Military Order of Foreign Wars. In 1902, he joined the Vermont Society of the Sons of the American Revolution and was assigned national membership number 15,452 and Vermont Society number 352.

He died of heart failure at his home in Long Beach, California on October 1, 1922. He is buried in Arlington National Cemetery along with Admirals Samuel Shelburne Robinson (1867–1952) and Charles Frederick Hughes (1866–1934).

The destroyer USS Clark (DD-361) was named for him.

On October 12, 1926, a statue of Clark in Bradford was unveiled.
