= Robert J. Coffey =

Canadian soldier and Medal of Honor recipient

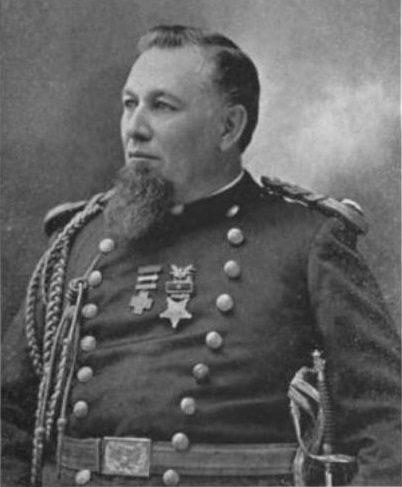
- The Vermonter magazine, June 1897
- Born: December 15, 1842; Saint John, New Brunswick, Canada
- Died: July 9, 1901 (aged 58); Bennington, Vermont
- Burial place: Green Mount Cemetery, Montpelier, Vermont
- Military career
- Allegiance: United States of America
- Branch: United States Army
- Service years: 1861 - 1864
- Rank: Sergeant
- Unit: 4th Regiment Vermont Volunteer Infantry
- Conflicts: Battle of Salem Church
- Awards: Medal of Honor

Sergeant Robert John Coffey (December 15, 1842 – July 9, 1901) was a Canadian soldier who fought in the American Civil War. Coffey received the United States' highest award for bravery during combat, the Medal of Honor, for his action during the Battle of Salem Church in Virginia on 4 May 1863. He was honored with the award on 13 May 1892.

== Biography ==
Coffey was born in Saint John, New Brunswick, on 15 December 1842. At the outbreak of the war he first enlisted into the 2nd Vermont Volunteer Regiment on 3 May 1861, serving for three months. He mustered into the 4th Vermont Infantry on 10 September of that year. He was promoted to 3rd Sergeant within this company and participated in several battles including the siege of Yorktown (1862), Battle of Antietam, Battle of Gettysburg, Battle of Fredericksburg and the Battle of Funkstown. On 4 May 1863, he performed an act of bravery during the Battle of Salem Church, for which he earned a Medal of Honor.

Following the war, Coffey married Demis Hattie Burnham, with whom he had one child. He was involved in the hotel business in several Vermont towns and also worked as a traveling salesman. When the Vermont Soldiers' Home was established in Bennington in 1887, the board of trustees unanimously chose him to serve as its first superintendent. He was also a longtime member of the Vermont National Guard and attained the rank of colonel as a member of Governor Urban A. Woodbury's military staff.

Coffee died in Bennington on July 9, 1901, and his remains are interred at Green Mount Cemetery in Montpelier, Vermont.

== Medal of Honor citation ==
Single-handedly captured 2 officers and 5 privates of the 8th Louisiana Regiment (Confederate States of America).

== See also ==
- List of American Civil War Medal of Honor recipients: A–F
