= Ferrand F. Merrill =

American politician

Ferrand Fassett Merrill (October 24, 1814 – May 2, 1859) was a Vermont attorney and Whig politician who served as Secretary of State of Vermont and in other offices.

== Biography ==
Ferrand Fassett Merrill was born in Montpelier, Vermont on October 24, 1814. His mother was Clara Fassett Merrill, and his father Timothy Merrill served as Secretary of State from 1831 to 1836.

Merrill studied law and worked as his father's deputy while he was Clerk of the Vermont House of Representatives and Secretary of State. Ferrand Merrill was state librarian in 1832 to 1833. He was admitted to the bar in 1836, and practiced in Montpelier. From 1838 to 1849 he served as Clerk of the Vermont House. From 1849 to 1853, he was Vermont's Secretary of State. In 1847, he received the honorary degree of Master of Arts from the University of Vermont.

From 1854 to 1856, Merrill was state's attorney of Washington County. In 1856 and 1857 he served as a member of the Vermont House. Among the prospective attorneys who studied under Merrill was Charles Herbert Joyce, who attained admission to the bar in 1852, and succeeded Merrill as state's attorney.

Merrill died at his office in Montpelier on May 2, 1859. He had been ill at home during the days leading up to his death, but decided on May 2 to keep an appointment to discuss forming a law partnership with Whitman G. Ferrin. He began to suffer chest pains at his office, and a doctor was summoned. Shortly afterwards, Merrill died, probably from the effects of a stroke. Merrill was buried at Green Mount Cemetery in Montpelier.

His name sometimes appears in records as "Farrand".

== Family ==
In 1844, Merrill married Eliza Maria Wright of Montpelier. They were the parents of three children: Chester W., Charlotte H., and Mary A. Merrill.

Ferrand F. Merrill was the nephew of Orsamus Cook Merrill, who served as a member of Congress from Vermont.

== Sources ==
=== Books ===
- Carleton, Hiram (1903). Genealogical and Family History of the State of Vermont. Vol. 1. New York, NY: Lewis Publishing Company. p. 64.
- Hemenway, Abby Maria (1882). The Vermont Historical Gazetteer. Vol. 4. Montpelier, VT: Vermont Watchman and State Journal.
- University of Vermont (1901). General Catalogue of the University of Vermont. Burlington, VT: Free Press Association. p. 224.
- Vermont General Assembly (1836). Journal of the Senate of the State of Vermont. Montpelier, VT: E. P. Walton. pp. 16–17.
- "Biographical Notes, Ferrand F. Merrill" (PDF). Correspondence, Timothy R. Merrill (1822-1894). Montpelier, VT: Vermont Historical Society.

=== Internet ===
- "Vermont Vital Records, 1720-1908, Birth Record for Ferrand F. Merrill". Ancestry.com. Provo, UT: Ancestry.com, LLC.
- Vermont Secretary of State (1993). "Clerks of the Vermont House of Representatives, 1778-1993". leg.state.vt.us/. Montpelier, VT: Vermont General Assembly.
- "Vermont Vital Records, 1720-1908, Marriage Record for Ferrand F. Merrill and Eliza M. Wright". Ancestry.com. Provo, UT: Ancestry.com, LLC.
- "Vermont Vital Records, 1720-1908, Death Record for Ferrand F. Merrill and Eliza M. Wright". Ancestry.com. Provo, UT: Ancestry.com, LLC.

=== Newspapers ===
- "Death of Hon. F. F. Merrill". The Burlington Free Press. Burlington, VT. May 6, 1859. p. 2 – via Newspapers.com.
- "Hon. F. F. Merrill". Green Mountain Freeman. Montpelier, VT. May 19, 1859. p. 2.

Political offices
Preceded by James McMillan Shafter	Vermont Secretary of State; 1849–1853	Succeeded by Daniel Pierce Thompson
