= John Burgess (political scientist) =

American political scientist (1844–1931)

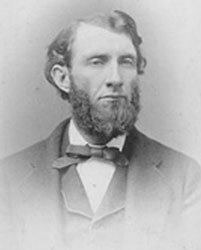
John W. Burgess

John William Burgess (August 26, 1844 – January 13, 1931) was an American political scientist. He spent most of his career at Columbia University where he in 1880 created the first graduate school in Political Science. He has been described as "the most influential political scientist of the period" and "the father of American political science."

== Early life and education ==
Burgess was born in Cornersville, Tennessee, on August 26, 1844. His father was a staunch Whig and part of the Tennessee planter aristocracy. His family, which held slaves, were unionists during the American Civil War, believing that slavery could more easily be maintained within a union with Northern states where the Northern states had to return fugitive slaves to the South.

He attended Cumberland University in Lebanon, Tennessee, from September 1861 until February 1862 when Burgess and other students fled as the Union army occupied parts of Tennessee. In 1862, Burgess sought to avoid conscription into the Confederate States Army. He escaped to Union-held territory where he was required to take an oath of allegiance to the Union. Burgess subsequently entered into the Union Army in 1862 and was stationed in West Tennessee.

He undertook study of history at Amherst College, graduating in 1867. He gained admission to the bar in 1869.

== Career ==
From 1869 to 1871, he was Professor of English literature and political economy at Knox College.

From there he attended the universities of Göttingen, Leipzig, and Berlin over the period 1871–1873, where he studied under scholars including the historian Johann Gustav Droysen; the economist Wilhelm Roscher; the historian Theodor Mommsen, whose linking history with law strongly influenced Burgess's own approach; and Rudolf von Gneist. He was much influenced by the training in research methods characteristic of German universities of the time. He sought to import these methods of research and scholarship, first to Amherst (unsuccessfully) and later to Columbia. He maintained a lifelong interest in German-American relations.

From 1873 to 1876, Burgess was Professor of History and Political Science at Amherst College.

In 1876, Burgess was appointed to a professorship in the Law School of what later became Columbia University, a post he held until his 1912 retirement. While at Columbia, Burgess taught constitutional law. In 1880, Burgess created the first graduate school in the discipline of political science in the United States. In 1886, he founded the Political Science Quarterly. From 1890 until his retirement in 1912, he was Dean of the Graduate School of Political Science at Columbia.

He was instrumental in establishing the Faculty of Political Science, the first major institutionalized program in the United States granting the degree of Doctor of Philosophy. These endeavors have led to his being widely regarded as one of the founders of modern political science.

In 1906, Burgess was Roosevelt professor at the University of Berlin and in the summer semester of 1907, he held a guest lecture at the University of Leipzig.

Burgess was a strong influence on the Dunning School of Reconstruction. Burgess "agreed with the scholarly consensus that blacks were inferior", and wrote that "black skin means membership in a race of men which has never of itself succeeded in subjecting passion to reason, has never, therefore, created any civilization of any kind."

In a 1904, Burgess argued for close British, American and German relations, justifying it in part on the basis of "ethnic affinity". He also argued that Swedes, Danes, Norwegians and the Dutch were "probably the purest Teutonic stock, and the best stock, in Europe". He added that it was a "sober truth that the Teutonic genius and the Teutonic conscience are the two greatest forces in modern civilization and culture."

Burgess defended how Southern planters treated slaves, arguing that most planters treated them well and that most slaves were content with slavery. Burgess criticized the 1852 novel Uncle Tom's Cabin, arguing that it was "a gross exaggeration" of how most slaves were treated.

Until the 1990s, he was memorialized on the Columbia campus with the designation of the "Burgess-Carpenter Classics Library" within Butler Library. Nicholas Murray Butler credited the teachings of Burgess along with Alexander Hamilton for the philosophical basis of his Republicanism.

According to Leon Epstein, Burgess was a leading academic figure in the last decades of the nineteenth century, but some of his influence was considered negative (due to his advocation of formalism as it applied to politics and governance) and he caused somewhat of an intellectual rebellion at Columbia.

He was the academic advisor of Charles Edward Merriam.

== Works ==
- 1890: Political Science and Comparative Constitutional Law
- 1897: The Middle Period, 1817-1858
- 1901: The Civil War and the Constitution, 1859-1865
- 1902: Reconstruction and the Constitution 1866-1876
- 1915: The European War of 1914 - Its Causes Purposes and Probable Results
- 1915: The Reconciliation of Government with Liberty
- 1923: Recent Changes in American Constitutional Theory
