= James Elliot (politician) =

Politician from Vermont (1775–1839)

Member of the U.S. House of Representatives from Vermont's 2nd district
- In office March 4, 1803 – March 3, 1809
- Preceded by: Lewis R. Morris
- Succeeded by: Jonathan Hatch Hubbard

State's Attorney of Windham County, Vermont
- In office 1837–1839
- Preceded by: Alexander S. Campbell
- Succeeded by: Alexander S. Campbell
- In office 1822–1823
- Preceded by: Martin Field
- Succeeded by: Samuel Elliot

Member of the Vermont House of Representatives from Newfane
- In office 1837–1838
- Preceded by: Roswell M. Field
- Succeeded by: Walter Eager

Windham County Register of Probate
- In office 1822–1834
- Preceded by: Royall Tyler
- Succeeded by: Asa Keys

Member of the Vermont House of Representatives from Brattleboro
- In office 1818–1819
- Preceded by: Jonathan Hunt Jr.
- Succeeded by: Samuel Clark

Clerk of the Windham County Court
- In office 1817–1835
- Preceded by: Edward R. Campbell 2nd
- Succeeded by: Marshall Miller

Clerk of the Vermont House of Representatives
- In office 1801–1803
- Preceded by: Nathan Osgood
- Succeeded by: Anthony Haswell

Personal details
- Born: August 18, 1775 Gloucester, Province of Massachusetts Bay, British America
- Died: November 10, 1839 (aged 64) Newfane, Vermont, U.S.
- Resting place: Prospect Hill Cemetery, Brattleboro, Vermont
- Party: Federalist; Democratic-Republican; National Republican
- Spouse: Lucy Dow (m. 1803)
- Children: 3
- Profession: Attorney; Author

Military service
- Allegiance: United States
- Branch/service: United States Army
- Years of service: 1793–1796; 1812–1813
- Rank: Captain
- Battles/wars: Whiskey Rebellion; Northwest Indian War; War of 1812

James Elliot (August 18, 1775 – November 10, 1839) was an American soldier, lawyer, author and politician. A holder of local and state offices throughout his life, he was most notable for his service as a United States representative from Vermont.

Elliot was born in Gloucester in the Province of Massachusetts Bay. His father died at sea while serving in the American Revolution, and Elliot's mother moved the family to New Salem, where he received his early education. He was indentured to a local farmer, and at age 15 moved to Guilford, Vermont to work as a store clerk. He served in the army during the Whiskey Rebellion in Pennsylvania and the Northwest Indian War, then returned to Vermont to study law and begin practice as an attorney. He later published a volume on his wartime experiences, which also included several poems and essays.

During the early 1800s, Elliot served as Clerk of the Vermont House of Representatives. Nominally a Federalist, in 1802 he won election to the U.S. House, where he served for three terms and became identified with many Democratic-Republican principles. After leaving Congress, Elliot edited newspapers in Philadelphia, Pennsylvania and Worcester, Massachusetts, then returned to Vermont to resume practicing law. He served briefly in the War of 1812, and continued to hold local and state offices, including Clerk of Windham County, member of the Vermont House of Representatives, Windham County Register of Probate, and State's Attorney of Windham County.

Elliot died in Newfane, Vermont on November 10, 1839, and was buried at Prospect Hill Cemetery in Brattleboro.

== Early life ==
Elliot was born in Gloucester, Massachusetts on August 18, 1775, the son of James Elliot, a sailor, and Martha (Day) Elliot. His father died at sea of smallpox after enlisting to serve during the American Revolution, and his mother moved the family to New Salem, where she worked as a seamstress to support them. His mother provided his early education, including teaching him to read, and providing him works including the Bible and popular histories of colonial America and the early United States. As a boy, he was indentured to a farmer in Petersham, who supplemented Elliot's early education while he worked on the farm. Elliot later worked to improve his education through self-study, and worked in a variety of occupations including store clerk.

== Start of career ==
He moved to Guilford, Vermont in 1790, where he clerked in a store and the circle of friends he developed included Royall Tyler. In 1793, Elliot enlisted in the United States Army, joining Captain Cornelius Lyman's company of the 2nd United States Sub-Legion. He attained the rank of sergeant, and took part in the response to the Whiskey Rebellion in Pennsylvania and the Northwest Indian War in Ohio. He received his discharge in 1796, and returned to Vermont. In 1798, Elliot published a volume of essays and poems which included details of the observations he made during his military service.

Elliot served as Clerk of the Vermont House of Representatives from 1801 to 1803. He studied law in the office of a local attorney during the early 1800s, and began a campaign for Congress in 1802. He was admitted to the bar in 1803, and began to practice in Brattleboro.

== Congressman ==
He was elected to the United States House of Representatives in 1802 and was reelected in 1804 and 1806, and served in the 8th, 9th, and 10th Congresses (March 4, 1803 to March 3, 1809). Though he had nominally been a Federalist, Elliot ran as a Democratic-Republican, identified with many Democratic-Republican principles, and was an admirer of several prominent members of the party, including Thomas Jefferson, James Madison, George Clinton, and Samuel Adams.

== Later career ==
Upon retiring from Congress, Elliot published the Freeman's Journal, a Democratic-Republican newspaper in Philadelphia. He then briefly edited the Worcester Spy, a Federalist newspaper in Worcester, Massachusetts. By 1812 he was residing and practicing law in Putney, and during the War of 1812 he was commissioned as a captain of Artillery to raise troops in Vermont for the United States Army. He later returned to Brattleboro and he served as Clerk of the Windham County Court from 1817 to 1835.

After the Federalist Party ceased to function, Elliot became a member of the Democratic-Republican Party and by the early 1830s he was identified with the National Republican Party. From 1818 to 1819 Elliot served in the Vermont House of Representatives. From 1822 to 1823 he served as State's Attorney for Windham County. He was Windham County's Register of Probate from 1822 to 1834, and served again in the Vermont House from 1837 to 1838. From 1837 until his death Elliot served again as Windham County State's Attorney.

== Death ==
Elliot died in Newfane, Vermont on November 10, 1839. He was interred at Prospect Hill Cemetery in Brattleboro.

== Family ==
In 1803, Elliot married Lucy Dow (1781–1869) of Haverhill, New Hampshire. They were the parents of three children, including son James Madison Elliot (1805–1807). Their daughter Mary Annette (1812–1896) was the wife of Wright Pomroy of Binghamton, New York.

Samuel Elliot (1777–1845), the brother of James Elliot, also settled in Vermont, where he became a prominent attorney and held offices including judge of the probate court.

== Published works ==
- Elliot, James (1798). The Poetical and Miscellaneous Works of James Elliot, Citizen of Guilford, Vermont. Greenfield, MA: Thomas Dickman.

== See also ==
- List of United States representatives from Vermont
- Politics of the United States

== Sources ==
=== Books ===
- Centennial Committee (1877). Centennial Proceedings and Other Historical Facts and Incidents Relating to Newfane, the County Seat of Windham County, Vermont. Brattleboro, VT: D. Leonard.
- Child, Hamilton (1884). Gazetteer and Business Directory of Windham County, Vt. 1724–1884. Syracuse, NY: Syracuse Journal.
- Deming, Leonard (1851). Catalogue of the Principal Officers of Vermont: As Connected with its Political History from 1778 to 1851. Middlebury, VT: Leonard Deming.
- Elliot, Walter Graeme (1887). A Sketch of the Elliot Family. New York, NY: Livingston Middleditch.
- Garraty, John Arthur; Carnes, Mark Christopher (1999). American National Biography. Vol. 7. New York, NY: Oxford University Press. ISBN 9780195127867.
- Howe, Marjorie Valliere (2000). Gravestone Listings of Prospect Hill Cemetery, Brattleboro, VT. Brattleboro, VT: V. V. Howe.
- Johnson, Allen; Malone, Dumas (1931). Dictionary of American Biography. Vol. 6 (Echols-Fraser). New York, NY: Charles Scribner's Sons.
- Roth, Randolph A. (1987). The Democratic Dilemma: Religion, Reform, and the Social Order in the Connecticut River Valley of Vermont, 1791–1850. New York, NY: Cambridge University Press. ISBN 9780521317733.
- Vermont House of Representatives (1867). Manual of the Legislature of Vermont for the Year 1867. Rutland, VT: Tuttle & Company.

=== Newspapers ===
- "Members of the House of Assembly, and their Officers, for the Year Ensuing". Green Mountain Patriot. Peacham, VT. October 15, 1801 – via Newspapers.com.
- "You are requested to inform our Republican brethren". Vermont Journal. Windsor, VT. November 23, 1802 – via Newspapers.com. "...James Elliot, Esq. of Brattleborough is considered as the most suitable person to represent this district in the Congress of the U. States..."
- "Married: James Elliot and Lucy Dow". Vermont Journal. Windsor, VT. May 24, 1803 – via Newspapers.com.
- "Republican Candidates for Congress". Vermont Journal. Windsor, VT. August 25, 1806 – via Newspapers.com.
- "Died: At Brattleboro, James Madison Elliot, age 2 y. and 6 months, only son of the Hon. James Elliot". Vermont Journal. Windsor, VT. November 9, 1807 – via Newspapers.com.
- "James Elliot, whose career as a Congressman may not be forgotten..." The Susquehanna Democrat. Wilkes-Barre, PA. April 5, 1811 – via Newspapers.com.
- "List of Officers of the United States Army in Vermont". Vermont Journal. Windsor, VT. April 20, 1812 – via Newspapers.com. "Captains: James Elliot, Putney, Artillery"
- "National Republican Convention". Vermont Mercury. Woodstock, VT. July 20, 1832 – via Newspapers.com.
- "The Senate: Resolutions". Vermont Watchman and State Journal. Montpelier, VT. November 25, 1839 – via Newspapers.com. "Alexander S. Campbell, State's attorney for Windham County, in place of James Elliot deceased."
- "Death Notice, Mary A. Pomroy". Brooklyn Daily Eagle. Brooklyn, NY. April 26, 1896 – via Newspapers.com.

== Additional reading ==
- Huddleston, Eugene L. (June 1, 1971). "Indians and Literature of the Federalist Era: The Case of James Elliott". The New England Quarterly. Vol. 44, no. 2. Cambridge, MA: MIT Press. pp. 231–237. JSTOR 364527.

U.S. House of Representatives
Preceded by Lewis R. Morris	Member of the U.S. House of Representatives from Vermont's 2nd congressional district 1803–1809	Succeeded by Jonathan H. Hubbard
