= The Contrast (play) =

1787 play by Royall Tyler

- Original language: English
- Written by: Royall Tyler
- Characters: Charlotte; Letitia; Mr. Billy Dimple; Maria Van Rough; Colonel Henry Manly; Van Rough; Jessamy; Jonathan; Jenny; Servants
- Genre: Comedy
- Setting: New York City

Premiere
- Date: 1787

The Contrast, written in 1787 by Royall Tyler, is an American play in the tradition of the English Restoration comedies of the seventeenth century; it takes its cue from Sheridan's The School for Scandal, a British comedy of manners that had revived that tradition a decade before. Royall uses the form to satirize Americans who follow British fashions and indulge in 'British vices'. Thus, the play is often concerned with portraying the contrast between European culture and American culture.

The Contrast is the first comedy written by an American citizen that was professionally produced. The play begins with a prologue written in heroic couplets. The play itself, a comedy of manners, evaluates home-made versus foreign goods and ideas. Its leading character, Jonathan, introduces to the theatre the "Yankee" stock character with his rough-hewn and plain-spoken manners.

== Characters ==
- Charlotte: Colonel Manly's sister, lives with her uncle in New York, has friends and good social standing; a coquette
- Letitia: friend of Charlotte and ward of Charlotte's uncle; possesses monetary wealth, which makes her attractive to Dimple
- Mr. Billy Dimple: the villain, a dandy, attempts to manage relationships with Charlotte, Letitia, and Maria at once; in need of money, an Anglophile fop
- Maria Van Rough: daughter of Van Rough, sentimental and virtuous
- Colonel Henry Manly: contrasting character to Mr. Dimple, a persona of America; a gentleman, patriot, and hero
- Van Rough: Maria's father
- Jessamy: Dimple's waiter/servant, as snobbish as his master, a persona of Europe
- Jonathan: Manly's waiter/servant, represents the New England Yankee, an unsophisticated country bumpkin, honest and patriotic
- Jenny: Maria's waiter/servant, Jessamy's friend
- Servants

== Plot ==
Setting: New York City, New York

The play begins with the coquettish Charlotte and Letitia talking about the forthcoming marriage and Maria's distress due to her father's marriage plans for her. Billy Dimple's father was Van Rough's business partner. Before the death of Dimple's father, a marriage between Van Rough's Daughter, Maria, and Dimple was settled. While Dimple becomes snobbish in England, Maria betakes herself to books that "improve her taste": "The contrast was so striking betwixt the good sense of her books, and the flimsiness of her love-letters, that she discovered that she had unthinkingly engaged her hand without her heart."

In the second scene, Maria bemoans the "helpless situation of [her] sex": "Reputation is the life of a woman - and the only safe asylum a woman of delicacy can find, is in the arms of a man of honor." Even though Maria reveals to her father a lack of love towards Dimple, old Van Rough still wants her to marry Dimple, stressing that “money makes the mare go”. For him his daughter's feelings are nonsense and money is the most important thing she should look out for. In a time when women usually were detained from enlightening their opinions by means of literature (biographies were acceptable, but no novels, since they were thought to produce a wrong world view), her father concludes that her sadness comes from “these vile books”. Not wanting to disappoint her father, Maria consents.

In Act II, Charlotte discovers that her brother, the good and honorable Colonel Manly, is in town. Manly fought in the Revolutionary War and is dressed in a soldier's coat, which seems totally unfashionable to the city's high society. Without knowing from each other's affair, Letitia and Charlotte, secretly reveal to the audience that they are also courted by Dimple. Snobbish Jessamy meets simple Jonathan, who has never been to such a big town and almost kissed a “harlot” without realizing it. Jessamy convinces “almost married” Jonathan to pursue some maids in the city. Jessamy introduces Jonathan to Jenny, and after the former takes his leave, Manly's manservant tries to kiss the girl. Jenny refuses angrily, since she thinks Jonathan much too unfashionable for her.

In Act III, Dimple says he loves Charlotte for her lively character, but needs Letitia's money. He also wants Maria to decline the match. Then Dimple, the villain, meets Manly and finds out that the Colonel is Charlotte's brother – just in time to prevent himself from telling Manly about his detestable attitude towards women. Dimple has an extensive monologue where he declares his love for European culture, despite living in America.

In Act IV, Maria tells Charlotte that Dimple insults and disgusts her and that she met a lovely man full of honor (Manly) this morning. Charlotte, being interested in Dimple, unsuccessfully “endeavour[s] to excite her to discharge him.” Manly and Dimple enter and the family relations are revealed to all characters. Van Rough meanwhile finds out about Dimple having lost seventeen-thousand pounds due to gambling and decides not to have his daughter married to such a fool. In that moment he more or less accidentally overhears a conversation between Manly and Maria revealing their love and affections to each other.

In Act V, Jessamy fails to teach high society's rules of laughing to Jonathan, who just laughs too naturally. Dimple meets Letitia, telling her that he loves just her and that Charlotte is nothing else than a “trifling, gay, flighty coquette”. Charlotte enters and Letitia pretends to leave. She observes the following happenings. After Letitia seemed to be gone, Dimple tells Charlotte that he is in love with her and that Letitia is an “ugly creature!” When Dimple forcefully tries to kiss her, Charlotte screams and Manly comes in to help her quarrelling Dimple. Old Van Rough prevents the men from stabbing each other and Letitia enters to reveal the happenings to everyone. After Dimple is gone dishonored, Van Rough agrees to Manly's marriage proposal and Maria ends up with Manly.
