= William W. Stickney (politician) =

American attorney and politician from Vermont

William Wallace Stickney
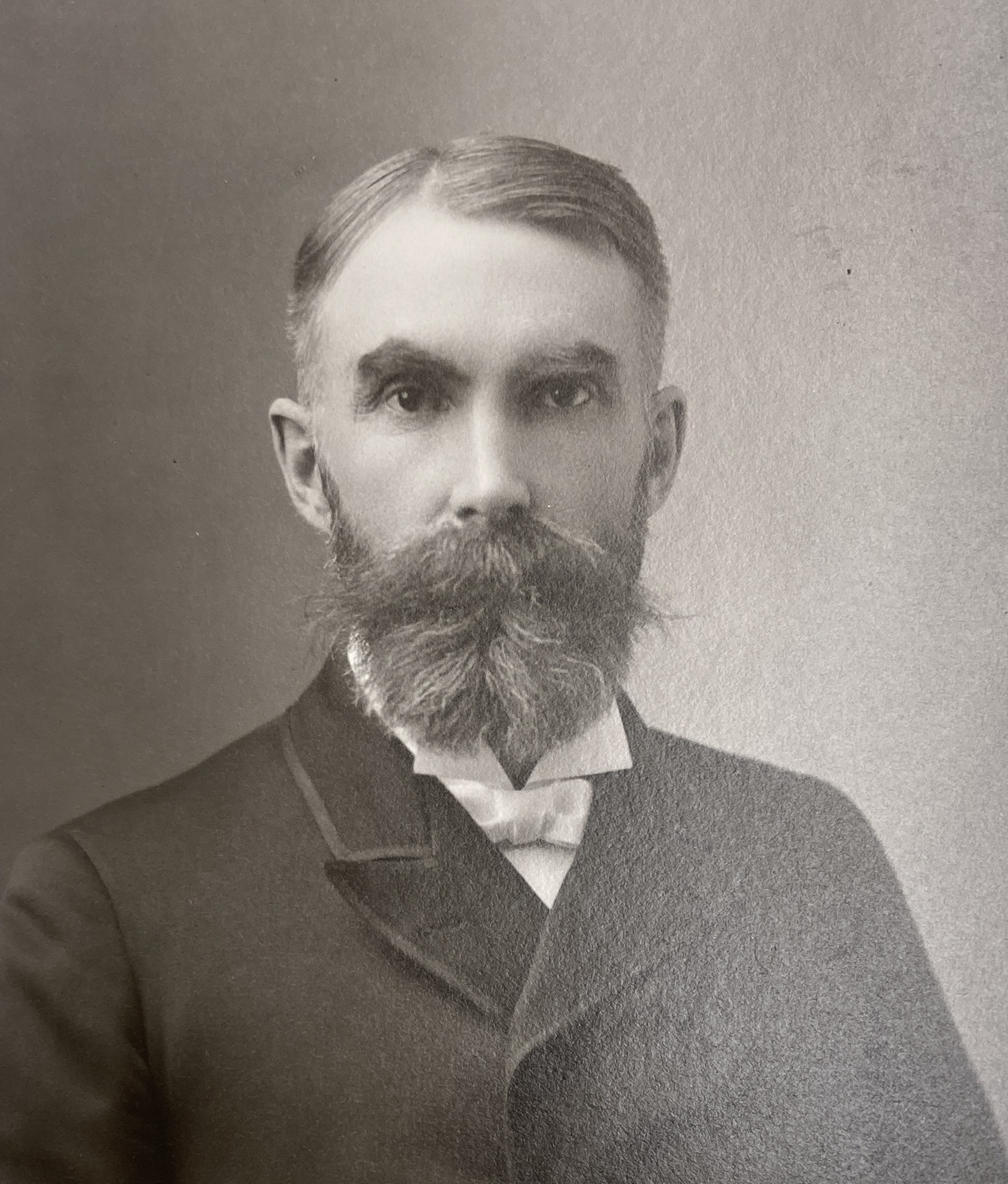
- Stickney in 1900

48th Governor of Vermont
- In office October 4, 1900 – October 3, 1902
- Lieutenant: Martin F. Allen
- Preceded by: Edward C. Smith
- Succeeded by: John G. McCullough

Speaker of the Vermont House of Representatives
- In office 1892–1896
- Preceded by: Hosea A. Mann Jr.
- Succeeded by: William A. Lord

Member of the Vermont House of Representatives from Ludlow
- In office 1892–1896
- Preceded by: Hiram L. Warner
- Succeeded by: Frank A. Walker

State's Attorney of Windsor County, Vermont
- In office 1890–1892
- Preceded by: William Brunswick Curry Stickney
- Succeeded by: Frederick C. Southgate
- In office 1882–1884
- Preceded by: Thomas O. Seaver
- Succeeded by: James J. Wilson

Personal details
- Born: March 21, 1853 Plymouth, Vermont, U.S.
- Died: December 15, 1932 (aged 79) Sarasota, Florida, U.S.
- Resting place: Pleasant View Cemetery, Ludlow, Vermont
- Party: Republican
- Spouse(s): Elizabeth Lincoln; Sarah E. Moore
- Education: Black River Academy; Phillips Exeter Academy
- Profession: Attorney

William Wallace Stickney (March 21, 1853 – December 15, 1932) was an American lawyer and politician. A Republican, he served as the 48th governor of Vermont from October 4, 1900, to October 3, 1902.

== Biography ==
Stickney was born in Plymouth, Vermont on March 2, 1853, the son of John Winslow Stickney and Ann Pinney Stickney. His siblings included Hiland Orlando Stickney, a notable college football player and coach. He graduated from Black River Academy in Ludlow, Vermont in 1873 and Phillips Exeter Academy in 1877. He went on to study law in the office of William H. Walker, was admitted to the bar in 1878 and practiced in Ludlow as the partner of John G. Sargent. Among the prospective attorneys who studied under Stickney and Sargent were Julius A. Willcox, who later served as an associate justice of the Vermont Supreme Court, and Joseph F. Radigan, who later served as Vermont's United States Attorney. Stickney married Elizabeth Lincoln on May 4, 1881. After her death on March 29, 1903, he married Sarah Effie Moore in Sarasota, Florida, on June 1, 1905.

== Career ==
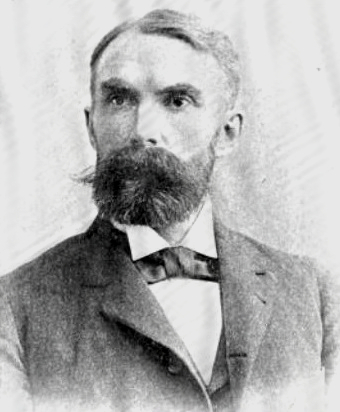
Stickney in 1900

Stickney was president of the Ludlow Savings Bank and Trust Company. He was clerk of the Vermont House of Representatives from 1882 to 1892 and state's attorney for Windsor County from 1882 to 1884 and again from 1890 to 1892. He was elected in 1892 to represent Ludlow in the Vermont House of Representatives, and served until 1896; he was selected to serve as Speaker of the House in his first term, and held the post during his entire House tenure.

Elected governor in 1900, he served from October 4, 1900, to October 3, 1902. Sargent served as Stickney's Secretary of Civil and Military Affairs (chief assistant). A cousin of the Calvin Coolidge family, Stickney appointed Coolidge's father John Coolidge to his military staff with the rank of colonel. As governor, he favored abolishing the office of Tax Commissioner. During his administration, legislation was passed establishing the boundary line between Massachusetts and Vermont. After serving the one term permitted under the Republican Party's Mountain Rule, he returned to his law practice and banking and insurance interests. He received the honorary degree of LL.D. from Norwich University in 1902.

As a delegate to the 1924 Republican National Convention, he seconded Calvin Coolidge's nomination for president.

In 1926 Stickney was also an unsuccessful candidate for the Republican U.S. Senate nomination. Stickney's Ludlow home is now a bed and breakfast called "The Governor's Inn."

== Death ==
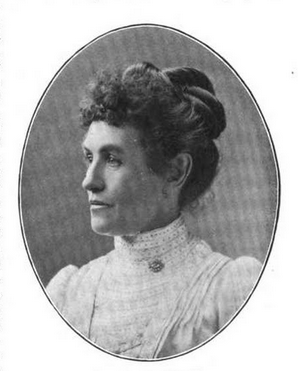
Lizzie Lincoln Stickney (1903)

Stickney died in Sarasota, Florida, and was interred at Pleasant View Cemetery in Ludlow, Vermont.

Party political offices
Preceded by Edward Curtis Smith	Republican nominee for Governor of Vermont; 1900	Succeeded by John G. McCullough
Political offices
Preceded by Edward C. Smith	Governor of Vermont; 1900–1902	Succeeded by John G. McCullough
