= The Algerine Captive =

1797 novel by Royall Tyler

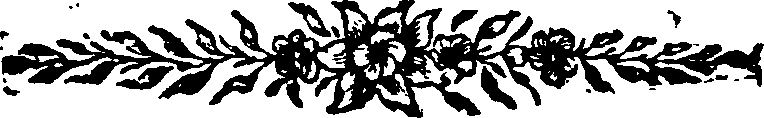
- Author: Royally Tyler
- Language: English
- Genre: Literary Fiction
- Published: 1797
- Publication place: American

The Algerine Captive: or the Life and Adventures of Doctor Updike Underhill: Six Years a Prisoner among the Algerines is one of America's first novels, published anonymously in 1797 by early American author Royall Tyler. The novel takes the form of a fictitious memoir.

== Plot summary ==
The Algerine Captive tells the story of the upbringing, early career, and later enslavement of fictional Boston native, narrator Updike Underhill. The first volume chronicles Updike Underhill's youth and early adulthood in America; the Preface suggests that its aim is to "at least display a portrait of New England manners, hitherto unattempted." After detailing his family history, Underhill describes his birth, childhood, and early education. Upon the encouragement of a local minister, Underhill's parents agree to prepare the narrator for college by placing him under the minister's tutelage. Underhill's classical education, through which he learns Greek and Latin, provides him with the ability to recite copious lines of poetry, which his countrymen ridicule. Not only is he mocked for his spouting of Greek poetry, which is unintelligible to all but himself, but he is actually challenged to a duel after writing an unintentionally insulting Greek-inspired ode to a young lady. Luckily for Underhill, the duel is discovered and preempted by the local sheriffs and constables before it can take place. This volume also gives an account of Underhill's failed attempt to serve as a teacher in a village school, follows his travels through the Northern and Southern states as a physician, and discusses his service as a surgeon aboard a slave ship that heads to Africa by way of London. In the final chapter of this volume, while Updike is on the African coast nursing five sick slaves back to health, he is captured and taken as a slave to Algiers.

In the second volume, Updike describes his enslavement and gives an account of the country in which and the people among whom he is confined. By setting Algiers in opposition to America, this part of the novel leads Underhill to comment on and formulate his conception of what it means to be American. When he is freed at the novel's conclusion, therefore, the message he imparts to the reader is a nation-building one: "My ardent wish is, that my fellow citizens may profit by my misfortunes. If they peruse these pages with attention they will perceive the necessity of uniting our federal strength to enforce a due respect among other nations...BY UNITING WE STAND, BY DIVIDING WE FALL."

== Form of novel ==
Numerous formal elements distinguish The Algerine Captive. The novel's division into two volumes allows for a natural break in the narrative between life in America and in North Africa. It is thought the two volumes also differ greatly in tone: Volume 1 follows the format of "a satire and a picaresque," whereas Volume 2 is dominated by "earnestness" and abolitionist sentiment.

In addition, each brief chapter within the two volumes begins with an epigraph and an "Argument," which details the proceedings of the chapter in a summary, which sometimes misleads the reader by inaccurately representing the chapter's contents.

== Reception ==
The Algerine Captive was popular enough that it was reprinted in England, becoming only the second American novel to achieve that distinction.
