= Prospect Hill Cemetery (Brattleboro, Vermont) =

Historic cemetery in Windham County, Vermont

- Interactive map of Prospect Hill Cemetery

Details
- Established: 1796
- Location: Brattleboro, Vermont
- Coordinates: Prospect Hill Cemetery 42°50′46″N 72°33′21″W

Prospect Hill Cemetery is a cemetery in Brattleboro, Vermont. Founded in 1796, it was originally known as the Village Burying Ground, and then Old Village Burying Ground. Additional land was acquired over time, up to 1869.

The cemetery includes a number of notable figures from the history of the town. Included in the graves at the site are those of 19 Union Army soldiers who died at the military hospital in the town during the American Civil War.

== Notable burials ==
- James Elliot (1775–1839), member of the United States House of Representatives
- James Fisk (1835–1872), financier and businessman
- Broughton Harris (1822–1899), public official and businessman
- Kittredge Haskins (1836–1916), member of the United States House of Representatives
- Frederick Holbrook (1813–1909), governor of Vermont
- George W. Hooker (1838–1902), American Civil War recipient of the Medal of Honor
- Jonathan Hunt (1787–1832), member of the United States House of Representatives
- William Morris Hunt (1824–1879), Boston-based painter
- James Manning Tyler (1835–1926), member of the United States House of Representatives
- Royall Tyler (1757–1826), public official and author
