= Lizzie E. Lincoln Stickney =

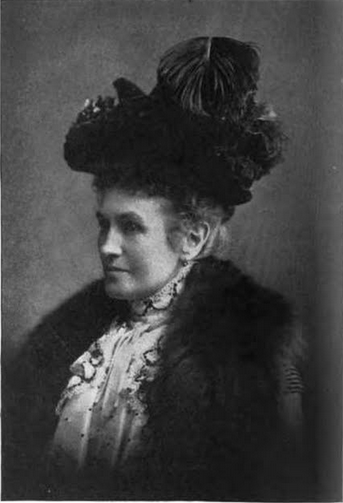
Lizzie Stickney (1901)

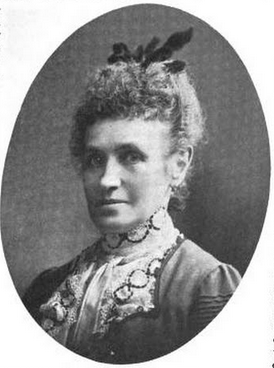
Lizzie Stickney (1901)

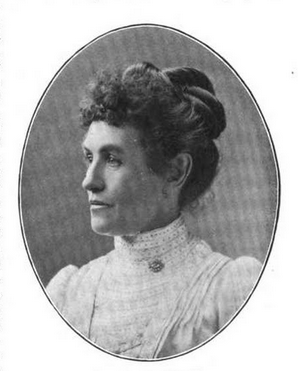
Lizzie Lincoln Stickney (1903)

Lizzie E. Lincoln Stickney (December 5, 1857 – March 29, 1903) was an American public figure who served as the First Lady of Vermont from 1900 until 1902 during the tenure of Governor William W. Stickney. She filled the position as the wife of the Governor in a modest manner.

== Early years and education ==
Elizabeth Lincoln was born in Shrewsbury, Vermont, December 5, 1857. Her parents were Walter H. and Ellen E. (Hunton) Lincoln, and her father, who was a farmer, died when she was four years old, and five years later Mrs. Lincoln and her daughter removed to Ludlow, where she was educated in the public schools and graduated from Black River Academy (1869–76) in the class of 1876.

== Career ==
On May 4, 1881, she married William Wallace Stickney, who had previously been admitted to practice law before the Vermont bar in 1878. William was clerk of the Vermont House of Representatives in 1882, and Mrs. Stickney accompanied him to Montpelier and had been there at every biennial session since, at least for ladies’ week, during the successive steps of her husband as clerk of the House, representative from Ludlow, speaker of the House, and finally governor in 1900. In this public life Mrs. Stickney had been a remarkable help to her husband, and had held a leading place in all social and public functions, for although all her life was spent in the country she possessed an instinctive courtesy and good taste which fitted her to grace any society. She was a consistent member of the Baptist church in Ludlow, and for over thirty years had been a faithful member of the choir. She was an accomplished vocalist and musician. At the time of her death she was treasurer of the church and of the Ladies' Home Benevolent society, and an active worker in the Woman's Missionary society, and chorister in the Sunday school. She was without children of her own, but was dearly fond of children, as they were of her. The Stickney residence in Ludlow was erected in 1892. She died March 29, 1903, and was buried at Pleasant View Cemetery in Ludlow.
