= Kittredge Haskins =

American politician

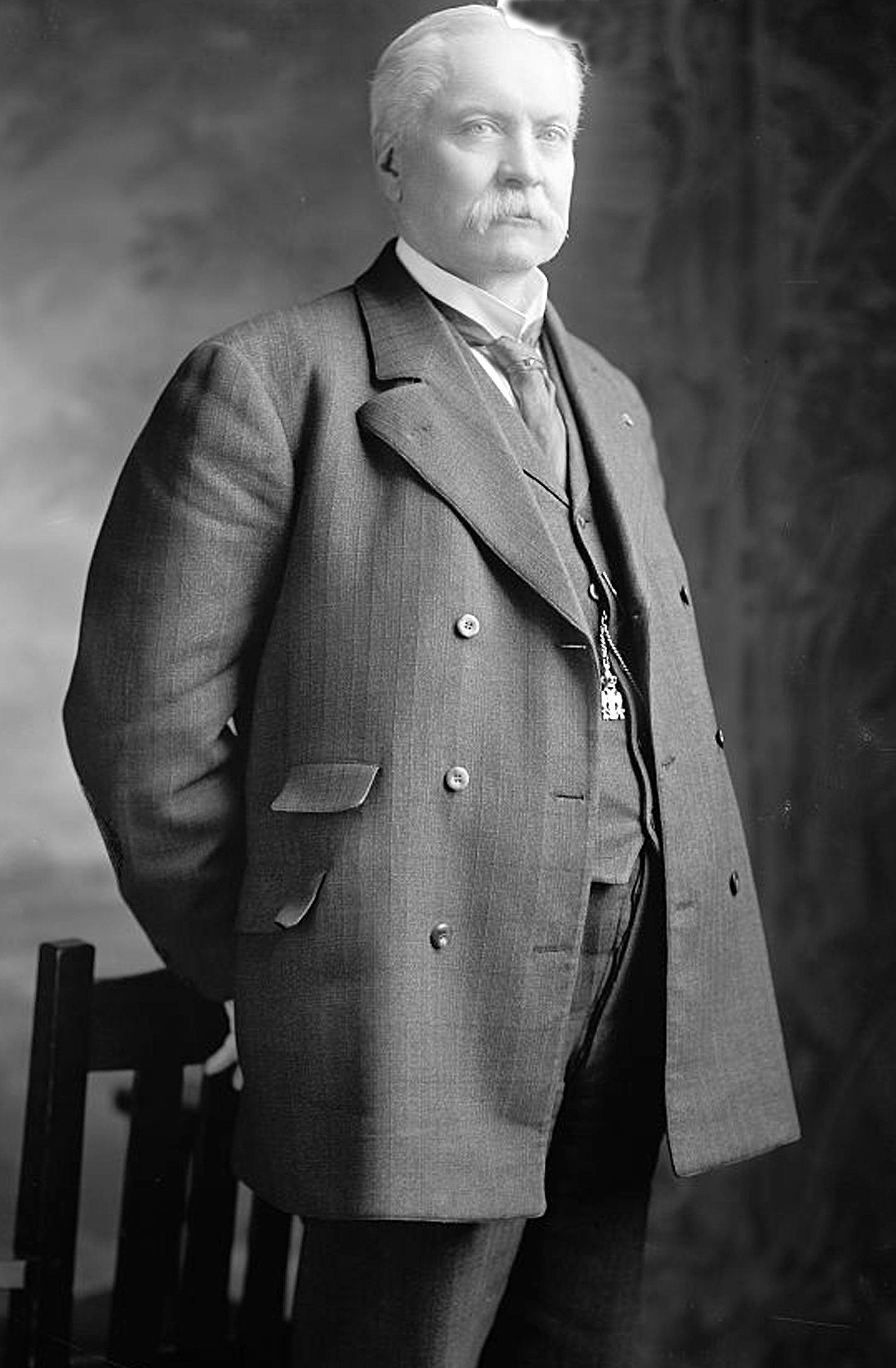
- Portrait by Harris & Ewing, 1905–1916

Member of the U.S. House of Representatives from Vermont's 2nd district
- In office March 4, 1901 – March 3, 1909
- Preceded by: William W. Grout
- Succeeded by: Frank Plumley

Judge of the Brattleboro, Vermont Municipal Court
- In office 1909–1911
- Preceded by: Ernest W. Gibson
- Succeeded by: William R. Daly

Speaker of the Vermont House of Representatives
- In office 1898–1900
- Preceded by: William A. Lord
- Succeeded by: Fletcher D. Proctor

Member of the Vermont House of Representatives from Brattleboro
- In office 1896–1900
- Preceded by: George A. Hines
- Succeeded by: Eleazer L. Waterman
- In office 1872–1874
- Preceded by: Edward Crosby
- Succeeded by: John S. Cutting

Member of the Vermont Senate from Windham County
- In office 1892–1894 Serving with Franklin P. Ball
- Preceded by: Sanford A. Smith, Jonathan W. Melendy
- Succeeded by: Marshall I. Reed, Daniel Sherwin

United States Attorney for the District of Vermont
- In office 1880–1887
- Preceded by: Benjamin F. Fifield
- Succeeded by: Clarence H. Pitkin

State's Attorney of Windham County, Vermont
- In office 1870–1872
- Preceded by: Charles E. Arnold
- Succeeded by: Eleazer L. Waterman

Personal details
- Born: April 8, 1836 Dover, Vermont, U.S.
- Died: August 7, 1916 (aged 80) Brattleboro, Vermont, U.S.
- Resting place: Prospect Hill Cemetery, Brattleboro, Vermont, U.S.
- Party: Democratic (Before 1861); Republican (From 1861)
- Spouse(s): Esther Maria Childs (m. 1860); Maud Arvilla Jane Elmore (m. 1912)
- Children: 1
- Profession: Attorney

Military service
- Allegiance: United States (Union); Vermont
- Service: Union Army; Vermont Militia
- Years of service: 1862–1863 (Army); 1866–1870 (Militia)
- Rank: First Lieutenant (Army); Colonel (Militia)
- Unit: Company I, 16th Vermont Infantry Regiment; Staff of Governor Peter T. Washburn
- Commands: Company H, 12th Regiment, Vermont Militia
- Wars: American Civil War

Kittredge Haskins (April 8, 1836 – August 7, 1916) was a Vermont lawyer and Republican politician. A Union Army veteran of the American Civil War, he served in the United States House of Representatives from 1901 to 1909.

A native of Dover, Vermont, Haskins was educated in the local schools, became an attorney, and practiced in Wilmington and Newfane before settling in Brattleboro. During the American Civil War, he served as a first lieutenant in the 16th Vermont Infantry Regiment. After the war, he attained the rank of colonel in the Vermont Militia.

Active in politics as a Republican, Haskins served as State's Attorney of Windham County (1870–1872) and Brattleboro's member of the Vermont House of Representatives (1872–1874). He was United States Attorney for the District of Vermont from 1880 to 1887, a member of the Vermont Senate (1892–1894), and again a member of the Vermont House (1896–1900). From 1898 to 1900, Haskins served as Speaker of the Vermont House of Representatives. In 1900, he won election to the United States House of Representatives, and he served four terms, from 1901 to 1909.

After leaving Congress, Haskins practiced law in Brattleboro, served as the town's municipal court judge from 1910 to 1911, and as the town's postmaster from 1911 to 1915. Haskins died in Brattleboro on August 7, 1917, and was buried at Prospect Hill Cemetery in Brattleboro.

== Early life ==
Kittredge Haskins was born in Dover, Vermont on April 8, 1836, the son of Asaph Haskins and Amelia (Ward) Haskins. His ancestors were longtime residents of New England and included veterans of the French and Indian War, American Revolutionary War, and War of 1812, and Haskins was a member of the Sons of the American Revolution. Haskins was educated in the schools of Dover and by a private tutor. He then studied law at the Wilmington, Vermont firm of Oscar L. Shafter and Charles N. Davenport. He was admitted to the bar in 1858, by which time Shafter had moved to California, and Haskins began to practice with Davenport in Wilmington.

In early 1861, Haskins moved to Williamsville, an unincorporated village in Newfane, Vermont, where he continued to practice law. He maintained an extensive practice and was admitted to both the state and federal courts of Vermont, as well as the United States Supreme Court.

Originally a Democrat, Haskins served in local office in both Wilmington and Newfane, including justice of the peace. His pro-Union stance at the start of the American Civil War led him to affiliate with the Republican Party, an association which he maintained for the rest of his life.

== Military service ==
In September 1862, Haskins joined the military for the Civil War by enlisting in Company I, 16th Vermont Infantry Regiment. He was subsequently elected his company's first lieutenant, and he served until March 1863, when he was discharged because of illness. After returning to Vermont, Haskins relocated to Brattleboro and worked for the state government as a civilian assistant to the assistant quartermaster of volunteers, including duty in Brattleboro, Burlington, and St. Albans.

Haskins later served as commander of Company H, 12th Regiment, Vermont Militia with the rank of captain. When Peter T. Washburn, who had served as adjutant general of the militia during the war, became governor in 1869, he named Haskins an aide-de-camp with the rank of colonel. After the war, Haskins was active in veterans organizations, including the Military Order of the Loyal Legion of the United States, Grand Army of the Republic, and Reunion Society of Vermont Officers, of which he was elected president in 1902.

== Continued career ==
Haskins was a member of the Vermont Republican State Committee from 1869 to 1872. He served as state's attorney of Windham County from 1870 to 1872. From 1872 to 1874, Haskins was Brattleboro's member of the Vermont House of Representatives.

In October 1880, Haskins was appointed U.S. Attorney for Vermont. He served during the presidential administrations of Rutherford B. Hayes, James Garfield, Chester A. Arthur, and Grover Cleveland, and held the office until July 1887.

Haskins was elected to represent Windham County in the Vermont Senate in 1892, and he served until 1894. From 1892 to 1900, he was a member of the state commission that established the boundary line between Vermont and Massachusetts.

In 1896, Haskins was again elected to represent Brattleboro in the Vermont House, and he served until 1900. From 1898 to 1900 he served as speaker of the Vermont House.

== U.S. House of Representatives ==
In 1900, Haskins was elected to represent Vermont's 2nd congressional district in the U.S. House. He was reelected three times, and served from March 4, 1901 to March 3, 1909. He was an unsuccessful candidate for renomination in 1908.

During Haskins' congressional career, he served on the elections, agriculture, labor, and war claims committees In his final term, he was chairman of the Committee on War Claims. At the end of his term in March 1909, the full House adopted the committee's final report without change, and several members attested that it was the most complete and accurate report ever submitted by the committee.

== Later career ==
After leaving Congress, Haskins resumed the practice of law in Brattleboro. He served as judge of the municipal court in Brattleboro from 1910 to 1911. Haskins was Brattleboro's postmaster from 1911 to 1915. He was a trustee of Norwich University from 1874 to 1887, and again from 1898 until his death. Norwich awarded Haskins the honorary degree of Master of Arts in 1873, and an honorary LL.D. in 1907.

Haskins was long active in Freemasonry, and held several leadership positions in Wilmington and Brattleboro, as well as at the state level. During his Masonic career, Haskins attained the 33rd degree of the Scottish Rite. He was also active in the Episcopal Church, and held several leadership roles in Brattleboro, as well as attending several general conventions as a lay deputy. Haskins was an organizer of the Brattleboro Free Library, and was the longtime chairman of its board of trustees.

Haskins died in Brattleboro on August 7, 1916. He was interred at Prospect Hill Cemetery in Brattleboro.

== Family ==
In 1860, Haskins married Esther Maria Childs. They were married until her death in January 1912, and were the parents of one child, son John ("Johnnie"), who was born in 1861 and died in 1864. In September 1912, Haskins married Maud Arvilla Jane Elmore (1876–1922).

U.S. House of Representatives
Preceded by William W. Grout	Member of the U.S. House of Representatives from Vermont's 2nd congressional district 1901-1909	Succeeded by Frank Plumley
