= Algiers, Vermont =

Unincorporated community in Vermont, U.S.

Coordinates: 42°49′06″N 72°34′38″W

Algiers is an unincorporated community and census-designated place (CDP) in the town of Guilford, Vermont, United States.

As of the 2020 census, Algiers had a population of 186.

== History ==
Algiers was first known as East Guilford. The first documented buildings were Tracy House (1789), Broad Brook Grange (1791), Broad Brook House (1816), and Christ Church (1817). The village was named by Brattleboro residents who competed against people from East Guilford in cribbage. They named them Algerian Pirates, and the name stayed.

In 1823, the Tontine Building was built with apartments and retail space. Sometime in the 1790s, the first grist mill was built in Algiers. The Christ Church was the first Episcopal church in Vermont. The Guilford Congregational Church was built in Algiers in 1854. The first schoolhouse was built in the 1790s. It was converted into a barn and later burned down. In 1853, the second schoolhouse (built in the 1820s) burned down.

In 1854, the third schoolhouse was built and was abandoned in 1955 when Guilford Central School was built. It later served as commercial space.

In 1949, the Congregational Church suffered a fire; this, along with several other fires in the preceding fifteen years, one of which was fatal, spurred the formation of the Broad Brook Fire Control in Algiers that year. Two weeks later, it became the Guilford Volunteer Fire Department. The fire station was hosted in the Broad Brook Garage in 1950, then on Guilford Center Road, from 1951 until 1954. The next station was built where the present one stands and was replaced in 2005.

Algiers was incorporated by the State of Vermont as a village in 2005. It is undergoing a rehabilitation project, including an apartment complex, a mixed-use building, and two refurbished apartment buildings, including the Tontine Building.
