= 1900 Vermont gubernatorial election =

- September 4, 1900
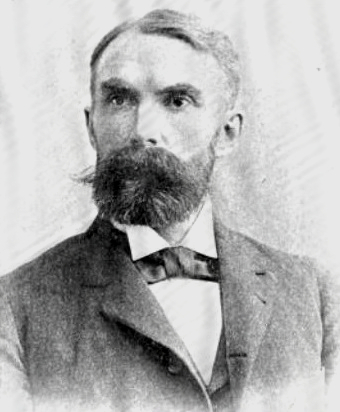

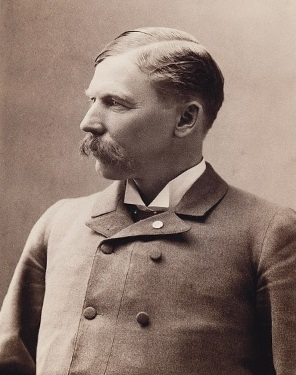
Nominee	William W. Stickney	John H. Senter
Party	Republican	Democratic
Popular vote	48,441	17,129
Percentage	72.19%	25.53%
- Stickney: 40–50% 50–60% 60–70% 70–80% 80–90% 90-100% Senter: 40–50% 50–60% 60–70% No Vote/Data
Governor before election
Edward C. Smith
Republican
Elected Governor
William W. Stickney
Republican

The 1900 Vermont gubernatorial election took place on September 4, 1900. Incumbent Republican Edward C. Smith, per the "Mountain Rule", did not run for re-election to a second term as Governor of Vermont. Republican candidate William W. Stickney defeated Democratic candidate John H. Senter to succeed him.

== General election ==
=== Candidates ===
- Henry C. Barnes (Prohibition)
- James Pirie (Social Democratic)
- John H. Senter, mayor of Montpelier and former United States Attorney (Democratic)
- William W. Stickney, former speaker of the Vermont House of Representatives and State Representative from Ludlow (Republican)

=== Results ===
1900 Vermont gubernatorial election
Party	Candidate	Votes	%	±%
Republican	William W. Stickney	48,441	72.19	
Democratic	John H. Senter	17,129	25.53	
Prohibition	Henry C. Barnes	950	1.42	
Social Democratic	James Pirie	567	0.84	
N/A	Other	12	0.02	
Total votes		67,099	100.0	
