= John Shepardson =

American judge (1729–1802)

Associate Justice of the Vermont Supreme Court
- In office 1778–1779
- Preceded by: None (position created)
- Succeeded by: Paul Spooner

Personal details
- Born: February 16, 1729 Attleboro, Massachusetts, British North America
- Died: January 3, 1802 (aged 72) Brattleboro, Vermont, U.S.
- Resting place: Guilford Center Cemetery, Guilford, Vermont, U.S.
- Spouse: Anna Blanchard (m. 1754)
- Children: 11
- Occupation: Farmer

John Shepardson (February 16, 1729 – January 3, 1802) was a Euro-American settler of Vermont. He was a veteran of the American Revolution, and served in local and state offices including justice of the Vermont Supreme Court.

== Biography ==
John Shepardson was born in Attleboro, Massachusetts on February 16, 1729, and was an early resident of Guilford, Vermont. Though most Guilford residents supported the colonial government of New York in the ongoing dispute over whether Vermont would be administered by New York or New Hampshire or become independent of both, Shepardson supported independence and was an ally of the faction led by Thomas Chittenden. During this conflict supporters of the New York position attempted to arrest Shepardson and Benjamin Carpenter. Shepardson avoided arrest, and Carpenter was detained but later released.

During the American Revolution he served as a private in the militia company commanded by Comfort Starr (1731-1812). Shepardson eventually obtained a militia commission and rose to the rank of major, the title by which he became commonly known.

Shepardson served as Guilford's town clerk, and was a member of the Vermont House of Representatives. He served as judge of Windham County's probate court, and was first judge of Windham County. He was a member of Vermont's Governors Council, and from 1778 to 1779 he served as an associate justice of the Vermont Supreme Court.

He died in Brattleboro, Vermont on January 3, 1802 and was buried at Guilford Center Cemetery.

== Family ==
In 1754, Shepardson married Anna Blanchard in Norton, Massachusetts. They were married until his death and were the parents of 11 children.
