= Benjamin F. Fifield =

American politician

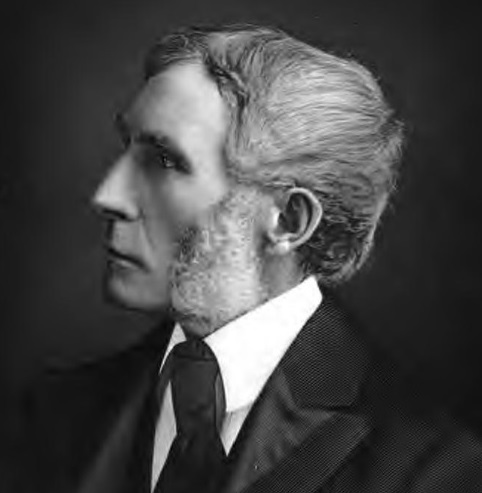
- From Volume II of 1903's Genealogical and Family History of the State of Vermont

United States Attorney for the District of Vermont
- In office 1869–1880
- President: Ulysses S. Grant; Rutherford B. Hayes
- Preceded by: Dudley C. Denison
- Succeeded by: Kittredge Haskins

Member of the Vermont House of Representatives from Montpelier
- In office 1880–1881
- Preceded by: Hiram A. Huse
- Succeeded by: George W. Wing

President of the Vermont Bar Association
- In office 1883–1884
- Preceded by: James Barrett
- Succeeded by: Aldace F. Walker

Personal details
- Born: November 18, 1832 Orange, Vermont
- Died: July 23, 1918 (aged 85) Montpelier, Vermont
- Resting place: Green Mount Cemetery, Montpelier, Vermont
- Party: Republican
- Spouse: Lucy Hubbard (m. 1865–1899, her death)
- Children: 3
- Education: University of Vermont
- Profession: Attorney

Benjamin F. Fifield (November 18, 1832 – July 23, 1918) was a Vermont attorney. He served as United States Attorney for the District of Vermont (1869–1880) and chief counsel of the Central Vermont Railway, and was a prominent corporation attorney who represented clients throughout New England and New York.

== Early life ==
Benjamin Franklin Fifield was born in Orange, Vermont, on November 18, 1832, the son of Orange Fifield and Melissa (Nelson) Fifield. Orange Fifield moved his family to Montpelier when Fifield was a youth, and he was educated in the public schools of Montpelier, Montpelier Academy, and Plattsburgh Academy in New York. He then attended the University of Vermont, from which he received a Bachelor of Arts degree in 1855. Fifield studied law at the Montpelier firm of Lucius B. Peck and Stoddard B. Colby, and was admitted to the bar in 1858.

== Career ==
Fifield practiced law with Peck and Colby. After Colby left Vermont in 1864 to serve as U.S. Register of the Treasury, Fifield became Peck's partner, and they practiced as Peck and Fifield until Peck's death in 1866. After Peck's death, Fifield continued the law practice as the firm's sole partner. His later partners included Charles W. Porter and Clarence H. Pitkin. Beginning in 1869, he served as counsel for the Central Vermont Railway, and his effective representation of corporations became so well known that he acquired clients from throughout the northeastern United States.

A Republican, in 1869, Fifield was appointed United States Attorney for the District of Vermont, and he served until 1880. When U.S. District Judge David Allen Smalley died in 1877, Fifield was the leading candidate to replace him, but withdrew in order to continue representing the Central Vermont Railway and other clients in pending litigation, which he did in addition to his U.S. Attorney's duties. In 1880 and 1881 he was Montpelier's member of the Vermont House of Representatives, and served as chairman of the House Judiciary Committee.

From 1883 to 1884, Fifield served as president of the Vermont Bar Association. In 1884, Fifield was a delegate to the Republican National Convention. In 1885, he was one of the federal commissioners appointed to select a site in Montpelier for a new post office and courthouse. In 1893, Fifield was one of Vermont's commissioners for creating and operating the state's exhibits at the World's Columbian Exposition. Fifield was also a longtime trustee of the University of Vermont.

== Retirement ==
In the mid-1890s, Fifield retired from most legal business, but continued to serve as counsel for the Central Vermont Railway. In January 1899, Governor Edward Curtis Smith offered to appoint Fifield to the United States Senate seat left vacant by the death of Justin Smith Morrill. Fifield initially gave his tentative acceptance, but declined several days later, informing Smith that he felt obligated to turn down the appointment so he could care for his wife during her final illness. Smith then offered the appointment to Jonathan Ross, who accepted.

== Death and burial ==
After Fifield's wife died in March 1899, he retired and continued to reside in Montpelier. He died in Montpelier on July 23, 1918, and was buried at Green Mount Cemetery in Montpelier.

== Family ==
In 1865, Fifield married Lucy Hubbard (1838–1899) of Montpelier. They were the parents of three daughters. Fanny (1865–1948) was the wife of Burnside B. Bailey. Arabella ("Belle" (1870–1963) married Julius F. Workum. Ellen (1875–1949) was the wife of Carlisle J. Gleason.

== Sources ==
=== Books ===
- Carleton, Hiram (1903). Genealogical and Family History of the State of Vermont. Vol. II. New York, NY: Lewis Publishing Company.

=== Newspapers ===
- "Judge Ross Appointed by Gov. Smith as Successor to the Late Senator Morrill". Burlington Free Press. Burlington, VT. January 12, 1899 – via Newspapers.com.
- "Death Came Today to C. H. Pitkin". The Evening Argus. Montpelier, VT. May 31, 1901 – via Newspapers.com.
- "Noted Lawyer Dead: B. F. Fifield for Years Leading Corporation Attorney of the State". Montpelier Evening Argus. Montpelier, VT. July 23, 1918 – via Newspapers.com.
- "Mr. Fifield's Funeral". Montpelier Evening Argus. Montpelier, VT. July 25, 1918 – via Newspapers.com.
