= Broad Brook House =

- U.S. National Register of Historic Places
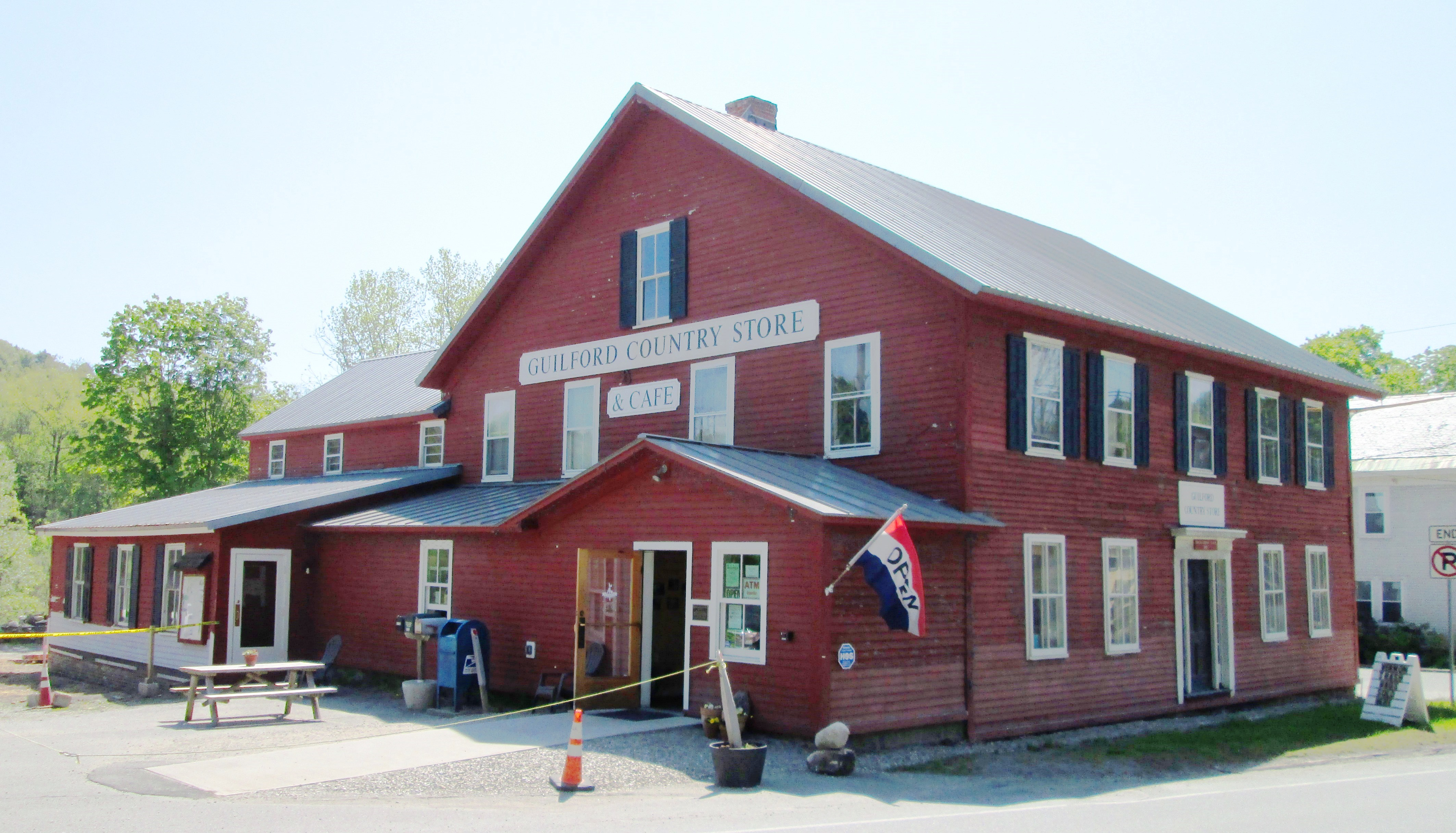
- (2016)

- Location within Vermont Location within the United States
- Location: 475 Coolidge Hwy., Guilford, Vermont
- Coordinates: 42°49′4″N 72°34′31″W
- Built: 1817
- Architectural style: Federal
- NRHP reference No.: 11000517
- Added to NRHP: August 4, 2011

The Guilford Country Store is located at 475 Coolidge Highway (United States Route 5) in Guilford, Vermont, in the 1817 Broad Brook House, one of the oldest surviving tavern houses in the state, which has been in continuous use as a general store since 1936. The building was listed on the National Register of Historic Places in 2011.

== Description and history ==
The Guilford Country Store is set on the east side of the junction of Coolidge Highway and Guilford Center Road, in the center of Guilford's main village. It is a 2 1/2-story wood-frame structure, with a side-gable roof, clapboard siding, and a foundation that is mainly stone. It is set close to the road, with its main facade facing west toward the road. The front is a symmetrical five bays wide, and the former main entrance has simple Federal period styling, with sidelight windows and a simple cornice. A gable-roofed ell extends to the rear, and a shed-roof ell extends across the northern facade, with a gable above the current main entrance. Its upstairs ballroom has been partially converted into residential space.

Broad Brook House was built in 1817 by Solomon Pratt, one of East Guilford's earliest landowners and businessmen. He built the tavern at this point on what was then the major north-south route (now US 5) through the area. Since then, the building has served a variety of important roles in the community, including as a meeting space, Masonic lodge, post office, inn, and barber shop. In 1936 George Fisher purchased the building, and moved the Morse general store, then located across the street, into it.

== See also ==
- National Register of Historic Places listings in Windham County, Vermont
