= John H. Senter =

American politician

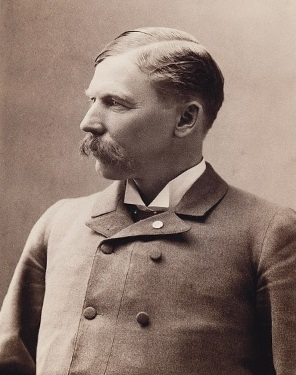
- From 1894's Men of Vermont Illustrated

Member of the Vermont House of Representatives from Montpelier
- In office 1906–1907
- Preceded by: George O. Stratton
- Succeeded by: Frank A. Howes

State's Attorney for Washington County, Vermont
- In office 1903–1904
- Preceded by: Frank A. Bailey
- Succeeded by: Hollister Jackson

Mayor of Montpelier, Vermont
- In office 1898–1900
- Preceded by: George H. Guernsey
- Succeeded by: Joseph G. Brown

President of the Vermont Bar Association
- In office 1902–1903
- Preceded by: John Young
- Succeeded by: Wilder L. Burnap

United States Attorney for the District of Vermont
- In office 1894–1898
- President: Grover Cleveland; William McKinley
- Preceded by: Frank Plumley
- Succeeded by: James Loren Martin

Personal details
- Born: November 11, 1848 Cabot, Vermont
- Died: January 20, 1916 (aged 67) Montpelier, Vermont
- Resting place: Green Mount Cemetery, Montpelier, Vermont
- Party: Democratic
- Spouse(s): Addie G. Martin, m. 1875
- Children: 5
- Profession: Attorney

John H. Senter (November 11, 1848 – January 20, 1916) was an American attorney and politician from Vermont. He is most notable for his service as United States Attorney for the District of Vermont (1894–1898) and Mayor of Montpelier (1898–1900).

== Early life ==
John Henry Senter was born in Cabot, Vermont on November 11, 1848, the son of Dearborn Bean Senter and Susan C. (Lyford) Senter. He was raised in East Montpelier, Vermont and Concord, New Hampshire. Senter graduated from high school in Concord and received his qualification as a school teacher. He taught at schools in Dover, New Hampshire, Garland, Maine and locations throughout Vermont. In the mid-1870s, Senter settled in Montpelier, where he clerked in several stores while studying law with Clarence H. Pitkin. He was admitted to the bar in 1879 and began a practice in Warren, Vermont.

In 1885, Senter moved to Montpelier, where he practiced law in partnership with Harlan W. Kemp, while they simultaneously operated an insurance brokerage. Senter served as secretary of the Union Mutual Fire Insurance Company, while Kemp was treasurer. While living in Warren, he served as the town's school superintendent. After settling permanently in Montpelier, he served as the village attorney and secretary of the village's board of trade.

== Party politics ==
Senter was a Democrat in an era when the Republican Party dominated Vermont, including a streak of winning every statewide election from the 1850s to the 1960s. Senter had a long career in Democratic Party politics, and despite party affiliation, he served in numerous elective and appointive offices. He served as assistant secretary or secretary of the Vermont Democratic Party for more than 20 years, and was a delegate to the 1888 Democratic National Convention. He served as chairman of the Vermont Democratic Party, and was succeeded by Emory S. Harris in 1900. From 1900 to 1904, Senter represented Vermont on the Democratic National Committee. In 1900, he was the Democratic nominee for Governor of Vermont. In the 1904 election for U.S. senator, Senter received the courtesy votes of Democrats in the Vermont General Assembly, while Republican Redfield Proctor was easily reelected.

== Local official ==
Even though he was a Democrat, in the 1880s and 1890s, Senter was habitually chosen for nonpartisan local positions. He was the chairman of Montpelier's village caucus, and he served as a justice of the peace, school superintendent, and in other local offices. Montpelier was incorporated as a city in 1895, and Senter served as mayor from 1898 to 1900.

== County and state official ==
Senter served on the state Tax Commission from 1896 to 1897, and during the same period he served on the commission that oversaw planning for and construction of a new county jail. From 1903 to 1904, Senter served as State's Attorney for Washington County. From 1906 to 1907, he represented Montpelier in the Vermont House of Representatives, and he served as chairman of the House Committee on Corporations.

== Federal official ==
During the first administration of Grover Cleveland (1885-1889), Senter served as a federal bank examiner for Vermont. In 1886, he was appointed a commissioner of the United States Circuit Court that included the Vermont district.

In 1894, Senter was appointed United States Attorney for the District of Vermont, succeeding Frank Plumley. He served until 1898, when he was succeeded by James Loren Martin.

== Civic and fraternal memberships ==
Senter was a longtime member of the Independent Order of Odd Fellows, and was active in the local Montpelier organization. In addition, he was a member of the Elks, Masons, Knights Templar, and Shriners. Senter served as president of the Vermont Bar Association from 1902 to 1903.

== Death and burial ==
Near the end of his life, Senter moved his law practice to Waterbury while continuing to reside in Montpelier. In 1915, he was treated for several times for angina. He suffered a fatal heart attack and died at his apartment in Montpelier on January 20, 1916. Senter was buried at Green Mount Cemetery in Montpelier.

== Family ==
In 1875, Senter married Addie G. Martin. They were the parents of five children, including Frank, Clarence, Mabel, John Jr., and Clara.

== Sources ==
=== Newspapers ===
- "John H. Senter Will Succeed Mr. Plumley". Burlington Clipper. Burlington, VT. January 12, 1894 – via Newspapers.com.
- "His Appointment Delayed: Martin Is In Washington to See About It". Montpelier Evening Argus. Montpelier, VT. January 10, 1898 – via Newspapers.com.
- "Senator Proctor Re-Elected" (PDF). The New York Times. New York, NY. October 19, 1904.
- "John H. Senter Dropped Dead". Barre Daily Times. Barre, VT. January 21, 1916 – via Newspapers.com.
- "Funeral of Mr. Senter". Montpelier Evening Argus. Montpelier, VT. January 24, 1916 – via Newspapers.com.

=== Books ===
- Dodge, Prentiss Cutler (1912). Encyclopedia of Vermont Biography. Burlington, VT: Ullery Publishing Company. p. 213 – via Google Books.
- Ullery, Jacob G. (1894). Men of Vermont Illustrated. Brattleboro, VT: Transcript Publishing Company.

Party political offices
Preceded by Thomas W. Moloney	Democratic nominee for Governor of Vermont; 1900	Succeeded by Felix W. McGettrick
Preceded by Burton E. Bailey	Democratic nominee for Vermont Attorney General; 1914	Succeeded by Frederick L. Webster
