= Guilford, Vermont =

- Town
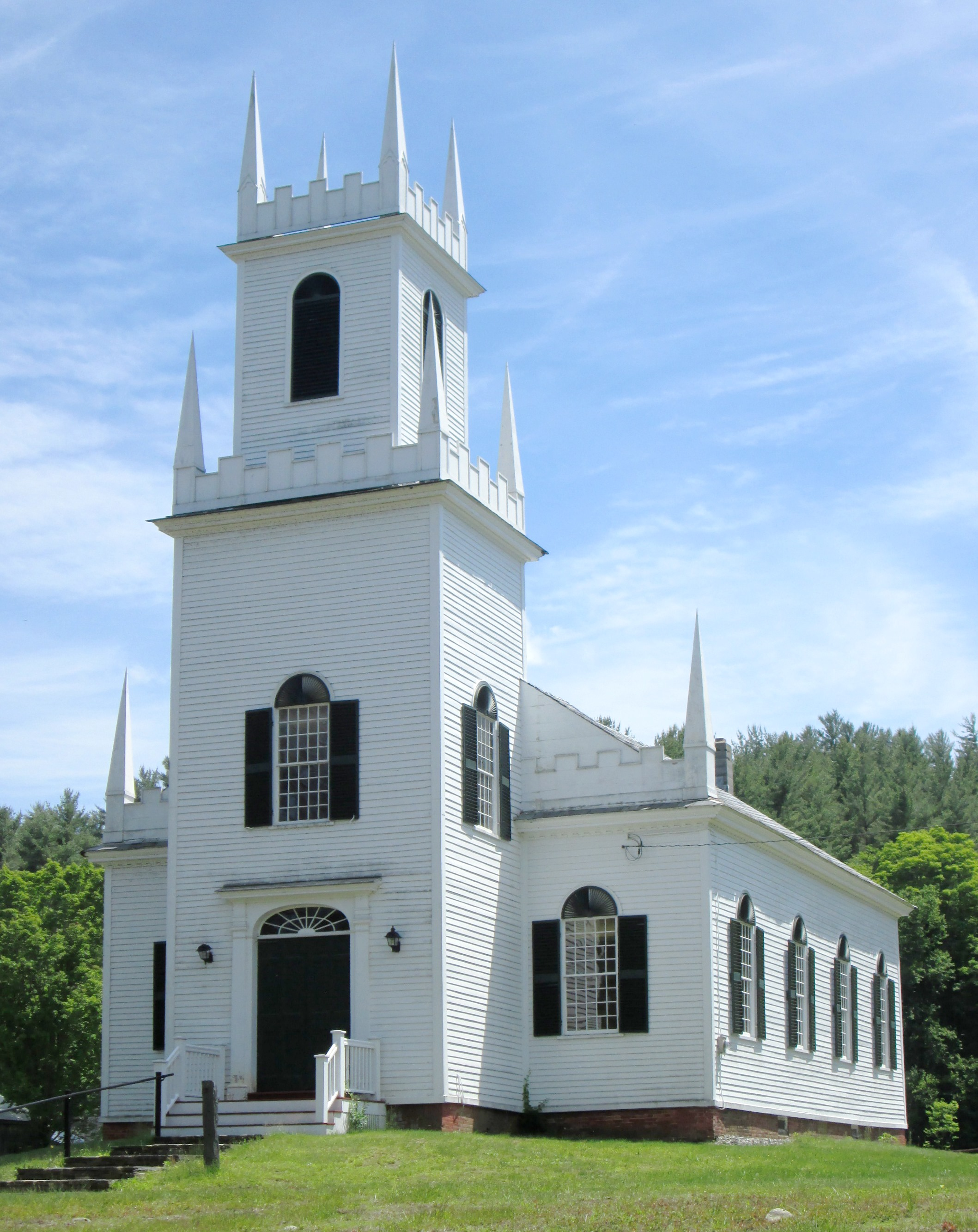
- Christ Church, built in 1817

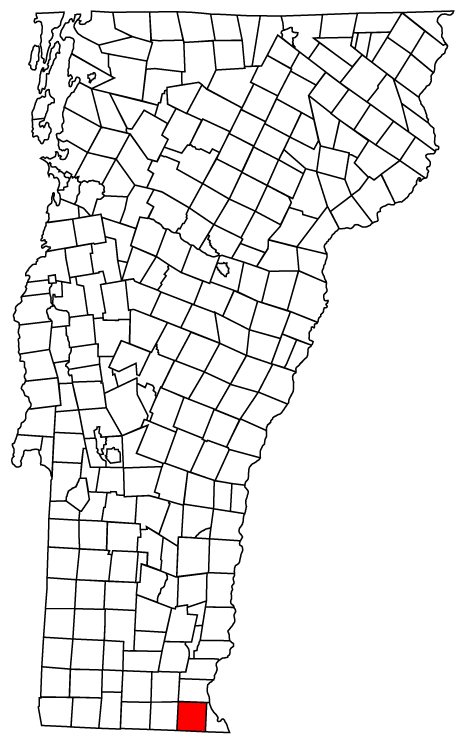
- Guilford, Vermont
- Coordinates: 42°45′56″N 72°37′35″W
- Country: United States
- State: Vermont
- County: Windham
- Communities: Algiers; Green River; Guilford Center; West Guilford

Area
  - Total: 40.0 sq mi (103.5 km^{2})
  - Land: 39.9 sq mi (103.3 km^{2})
  - Water: 0.077 sq mi (0.2 km^{2})
- Elevation: 1,116 ft (340 m)

Population (2020)
  - Total: 2,120
  - Density: 53/sq mi (20.5/km^{2})
- Time zone: UTC-5 (Eastern (EST))
  - Summer (DST): UTC-4 (EDT)
- ZIP code: 05301
- Area code: 802
- FIPS code: 50-30925
- GNIS feature ID: 1462112
- Website: guilfordvt.gov

Guilford is a town in Windham County, Vermont, United States. The town was named for Francis North, 1st Earl of Guilford. The population was 2,120 at the 2020 census.

== Geography ==
According to the United States Census Bureau, the town has a total area of 40.0 square miles (104 km^{2}), of which 39.9 square miles (103 km^{2}) is land and 0.1 square miles (0.26 km^{2}) (0.20%) is water.

== Demographics ==
Historical population
Census	Pop.	Note	%±
1790	2,432		—
1800	2,256		−7.2%
1810	1,872		−17.0%
1820	1,862		−0.5%
1830	1,760		−5.5%
1840	1,525		−13.4%
1850	1,389		−8.9%
1860	1,291		−7.1%
1870	1,277		−1.1%
1880	1,096		−14.2%
1890	870		−20.6%
1900	782		−10.1%
1910	769		−1.7%
1920	684		−11.1%
1930	663		−3.1%
1940	686		3.5%
1950	796		16.0%
1960	823		3.4%
1970	1,108		34.6%
1980	1,532		38.3%
1990	1,941		26.7%
2000	2,046		5.4%
2010	2,121		3.7%
2020	2,120		0.0%
U.S. Decennial Census

As of the census of 2010, there were 2,121 people, 902 households, and 574 families residing in the town. The population density was 53.2 people per square mile (20.5 people/km^{2}). There were 1,038 housing units at an average density of 26.0 per square mile (10.0/km^{2}). The racial makeup of the town was 97.2% White, 0.5% African American, 0.0% Native American, 0.2% Asian, 0.6% from other races, and 1.5% from two or more races. Hispanic or Latino of any race were 1.1% of the population.

There were 902 households, out of which 25.3% had children under the age of 18 living with them, 49.9% were husbands and wives living together, 8.3% had a female householder with no husband present, and 5.4% had a male householder with no wife present. 36.4% of all households were non-families, and 27.1% of all households were made up of individuals. The average household size was 2.35 and the average family size was 2.85.

In the town, the population was spread out, with 22.2% 19 years old or younger, 3.9% from 20 to 24, 23.0% from 25 to 44, 37.7% from 45 to 64, and 14.2% who were 65 years of age or older. The median age was 46.3 years. For every 100 females, there were 99.9 males.

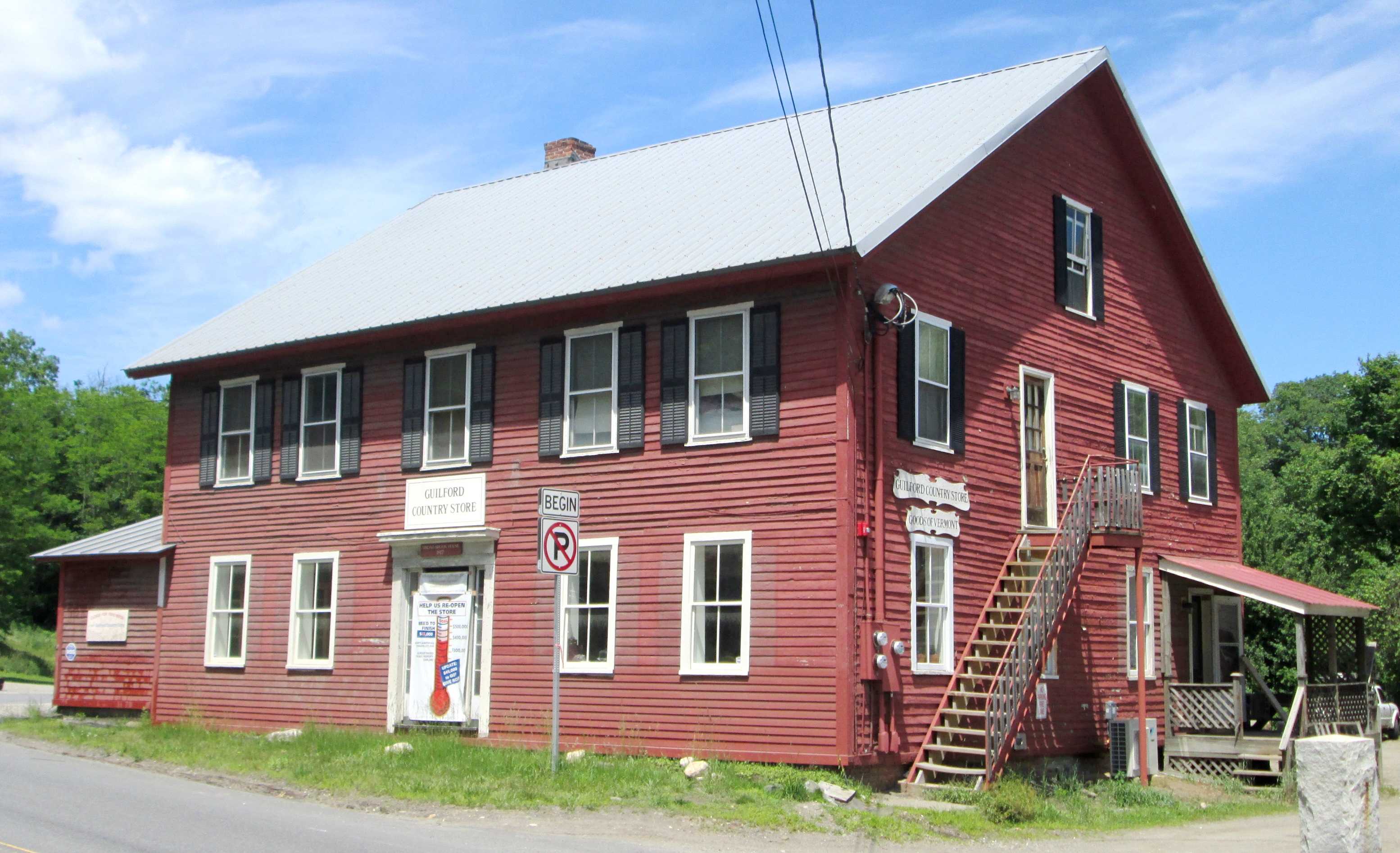
Guilford Country Store, built in 1817 as Broad Brook House

The median income for a household in the town was $57,674, and the median income for a family was $77,431. Full-time working males had a median income of $42,250 versus $31,725 for females. The per capita income for the town was $28,612. About 2.9% of families and 7.6% of the population were below the poverty line, including 12.2% of those under the age of 18 and 2.5% of those 65 and older.

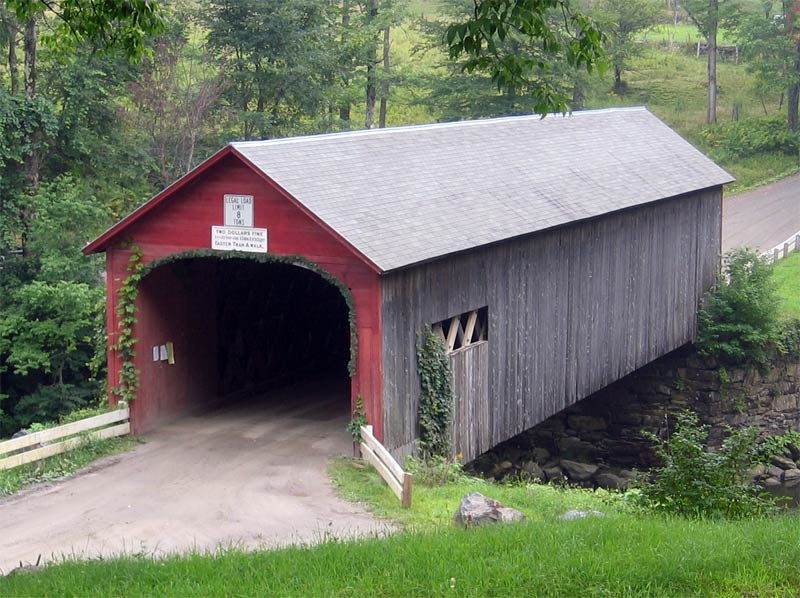
A covered bridge in Guilford

== Historical timeline ==
- 1732 – Chartered as Gallup's Canada, Massachusetts
- 1754 – Chartered as Guilford, New Hampshire
- 1758 – Chartered as Guilford, New York
- 1760 or 1761 – First settler arrives, either Lucy Terry (1760) or Michah Rice (1761)
- 1782 – First house and barn built in Guilford burn down
- 1791 – Chartered as Guilford, Vermont
- 1791-1820 – Guilford is most populous town in Vermont
- 1816 – First Episcopal church in Vermont built in Guilford, Christ Church
- 1817 – Broad Brook House built, now houses the Guilford Country Store
- 1820 – East Guilford Cotton Mill on Bee Barn Road burns down
- 1822 – First Guilford Town Hall built on Guilford Center Road in Guilford Center, now historical museum
- 1837 – Universalist church built in Guilford Center
- 1855 – Algiers (East Guilford) schoolhouse burns down
- 1884 – Broad Brook Grange Hall #151 built in Guilford Center
- 1885 – Green River Paper Mill burns down
- 1889 – East Guilford Grist Mill, first mill built in Guilford, burns down
- 1900 – Post offices close after establishment of RFD 3
- 1934 – Barn burns down on Yeaw Road, killing two young girls
- 1948 – Guilford Recreation Club organized
- 1949 – Broad Brook Fire Control organized
- 1949 – Broad Brook Fire Control becomes Guilford Volunteer Fire Department
- 1954 – First firehouse built in Algiers on Guilford Center Road
- 1957 – Guilford Central School built, all old schoolhouses closed
- 1970 – House burns down on Johnson Pasture Drive, killing four people
- 1972 – Guilford Town Hall built on School Road
- 2005 – New firehouse built on Guilford Center Road in Algiers
- 2007 – Town constable given police cruiser, a step toward a town Police Department
- 2007 – First full-time firefighter in Guilford

== Notable people ==
- Benjamin Carpenter, Lieutenant Governor, buried in West Guilford's Carpenter Cemetery
- James Elliot, author and United States Representative from Vermont
- Halbert S. Greenleaf, former US Congressman from New York
- Christopher Hitchens, writer, was Olivia Wilde's babysitter for a time
- Jonathan Hunt, former Lieutenant Governor of Vermont and early landowner in Guilford
- Charles E. Phelps, US Army brigadier general; Medal of Honor recipient; US congressman
- John W. Phelps, brigadier general in the American Civil War and abolitionist
- Rudolf Serkin, Austrian pianist
- John Shepardson, one of the first settlers of Guilford, justice of the Vermont Supreme Court
- Lucy Terry, African-American poet
- Royall Tyler, playwright
- Olivia Wilde, actress.
