= Ashbel A. Dean =

American politician (1857–1899)

Ashbel A. Dean (February 6, 1857 – July 5, 1899) was a Vermont physician and politician who served as president of the Vermont Senate.

== Biography ==
Ashbel Azra Dean was born in Monkton, Vermont on February 6, 1857. He was educated at New Haven's New Haven Academy (later called Beeman Academy), received his Doctor of Medicine degree from New York University in 1878 and established a practice in Bristol.

A Republican, Dean served in several local offices, including town treasurer.

In 1890 Dean left his medical practice and operated a drug store, which he pursued until retiring because of ill health in 1895.

In 1894 he was elected to the Vermont House of Representatives. In 1896 he was elected to the Vermont Senate, where he served until his death. In his first term he was selected to serve as President of the Senate.

Dean died in Bristol on July 5, 1899.

Political offices
Preceded by Frank Plumley	President pro tempore of the Vermont State Senate; 1896 – 1898	Succeeded by John G. McCullough
