= William A. Lord =

American politician

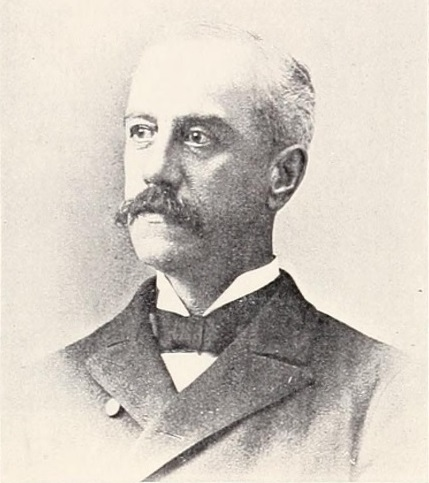
- From Volume II of 1901's Memoirs of the Judiciary and the Bar of New England for the Nineteenth Century

Member of the Vermont Senate
- In office 1904–1906 Serving with Oscar G. Eaton, Merton D. Wells
- Preceded by: Nelson D. Phelps, William B. Mayo, George F. Sibley
- Succeeded by: Frank G. Howland, George W. Moody, John L. Moseley
- Constituency: Washington County

Speaker of the Vermont House of Representatives
- In office 1896–1898
- Preceded by: William W. Stickney
- Succeeded by: Kittredge Haskins

Member of the Vermont House of Representatives
- In office 1894–1898
- Preceded by: Thomas J. Boynton
- Succeeded by: Harlan W. Kemp
- Constituency: Montpelier

Personal details
- Born: August 28, 1849 Montpelier, Vermont, U.S.
- Died: August 21, 1927 (aged 77) Montpelier, Vermont, U.S.
- Resting place: Green Mount Cemetery, Montpelier, Vermont, U.S.
- Party: Republican
- Spouse(s): Lucy A. (Reynolds) Young (m. 1883); Mabel Louise Newcomb (m. 1894)
- Children: 1
- Education: Dartmouth College
- Occupation: Attorney

William A. Lord (August 28, 1849 – August 21, 1927) was a Vermont lawyer and politician who served as Speaker of the Vermont House of Representatives.

== Biography ==
William Adams Lord was born in Montpelier, Vermont, on August 28, 1849, the son of William Hayes Lord and Harriet Adams (Aiken) Lord. He graduated from Dartmouth College in 1869, studied law and became an attorney in Montpelier.

A Republican, Lord served in several local offices and on the staff of the Vermont Senate. In 1896 Lord was Chairman of the Vermont Republican Convention. Lord served two terms in the Vermont House of Representatives, 1894 to 1898, and was Speaker from 1896 to 1898. Lord resigned as Speaker to accept appointment as a federal bank examiner and Commissioner of the United States Circuit Court.

In 1904 Lord was elected to the Vermont Senate. From 1904 to 1906 Lord was Chairman of the commission that revised Vermont's statutes, and from 1906 to 1908 he was head of the board of editors that published the revised work.

Lord died in Montpelier on August 21, 1927. He was buried at Green Mount Cemetery in Montpelier.

== Personal ==
In 1883, Lord married Lucy A. (Reynolds) Young. She died in 1893, and in 1894 he married Mabel Louise Newcomb. With his second wife, Lord was the father of a daughter, Dorothy Louise.

Lord was the grandson of Nathan Lord, the longtime President of Dartmouth College.

Political offices
Preceded by William W. Stickney	Speaker of the Vermont House of Representatives; 1896–1898	Succeeded by Kittredge Haskins
