= Clarence H. Pitkin =

American attorney and businessman (1849-1901)

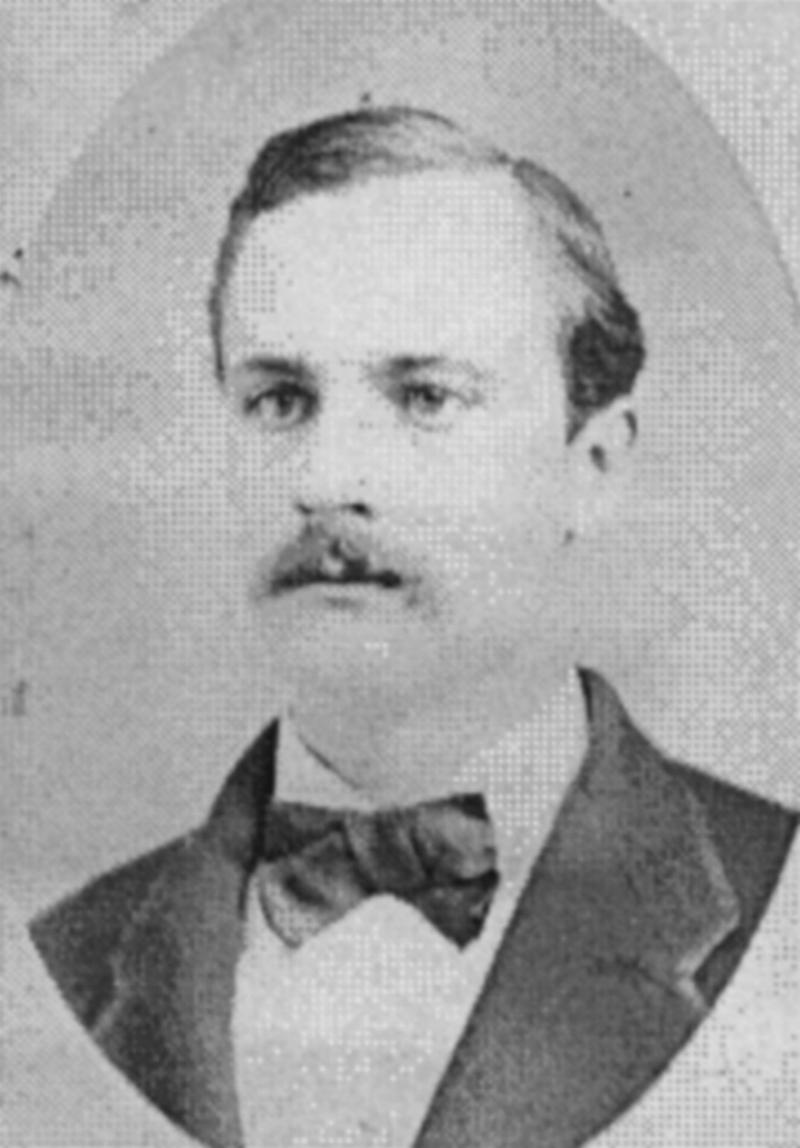

United States Attorney for the District of Vermont
- In office 1887–1889
- President: Grover Cleveland
- Preceded by: Kittredge Haskins
- Succeeded by: Frank Plumley

State's Attorney of Washington County, Vermont
- In office 1880–1882
- Preceded by: Frank Plumley
- Succeeded by: Hiram A. Huse

Personal details
- Born: August 26, 1849 East Montpelier, Vermont
- Died: May 31, 1901 (aged 51) Berlin, Vermont
- Resting place: Green Mount Cemetery, Montpelier, Vermont
- Party: Republican
- Spouse(s): Catherine Lamora (1855-1924), m. 1884
- Children: 1
- Education: Amherst College (attended)
- Profession: Attorney

Clarence Horatio Pitkin (August 26, 1849 – May 31, 1901) was a Vermont attorney and businessman. He served for two years as United States attorney for the District of Vermont.

== Early life ==
Clarence Horatio Pitkin was born in East Montpelier, Vermont, on August 26, 1849, the son of Perley P. Pitkin and Caroline Matilda (Templeton) Pitkin. Pikin's father was a prominent Montpelier businessman and banker, served as a Union Army officer during the American Civil War, and later attained the rank of brigadier general as quartermaster of the Vermont Militia. Clarence Pitkin was educated in Montpelier, and attended Amherst College. Deciding on a legal career, he studied law with Benjamin F. Fifield of Montpelier, and attained admission to the bar in 1872.

== Start of career ==
Pitkin practiced in Montpelier as the partner of Fifield and Charles W. Porter, and continued with Pitkin after Fifield's retirement. Pitkin later practiced in partnership with Hiram A. Huse, who had studied law in his office. Among the other prospective attorneys who studied under Pitkin was John H. Senter.

A Republican, from 1880 to 1882, Pitkin served as State's Attorney of Washington County. In 1881, he was one of the commissioners appointed to revise the state statutes.

In 1887, Pitkin succeeded Kittredge Haskins as United States attorney for the District of Vermont. He served until 1890, and was succeeded by Frank Plumley.

== Later career ==
The Pitkin family's business interests included the Lane Manufacturing Company, of which Perley P. Pitkin became president in 1888. As the company expanded, it required more involvement from the family members involved in its management, including Clarence Pitkin. He became the company's secretary, and soon after resigning as U.S. attorney he gave up the practice of law to devote his full attention to Lane Manufacturing.

== Death and burial ==
Pitkin continued to serve as secretary of Lane Manufacturing, and resided on a farm near Montpelier Junction in the town of Berlin. His health began to decline in early 1901, and he died at his Montpelier Junction home on May 31, 1901. Pitkin was buried at Green Mount Cemetery in Montpelier.

== Family ==
In 1884, Pitkin married Catherine (or Katherine) Lamora (or Lamery) (1855–1924). They were the parents of a son, Harold (1879–1900). Harold Pitkin died of tuberculosis, and Clarence Pitkin's obituaries indicated that his son's death contributed to his own declining health.

== Sources ==
=== Newspapers ===
- "The New District Attorney". St. Albans Daily Messenger. St. Albans, VT. June 15, 1887 – via Newspapers.com.
- "A Word of Caution". Vermont Phoenix. Brattleboro, VT. April 19, 1889 – via Newspapers.com.
- "Death Notice, Harold Pitkin". The Daily Journal. Montpelier, VT. November 13, 1900 – via Newspapers.com.
- "Death Came Today to C. H. Pitkin". The Evening Argus. Montpelier, VT. May 31, 1901 – via Newspapers.com.

=== Books ===
- Pitkin, A. P. (1887). Pitkin Family of America. Hartford, CT: Case, Lockwood & Brainard.
- Amherst College (1903). Octogintennial Catalogue of Amherst College, 1821-1902. Amherst, MA: Carpenter & Morehouse.

=== Internet ===
- Berlin, VT Town Clerk (April 15, 1884). "Marriage Record, Clarence H. Pitkin and Catherine Lamora". Ancestry.com.
- Montpelier, VT City Clerk (March 10, 1924). "Death Record, Catherine Lamery Pitkin". Ancestry.com.
