= Jonathan H. Hubbard =

American politician (1768–1849)

Jonathan Hatch Hubbard
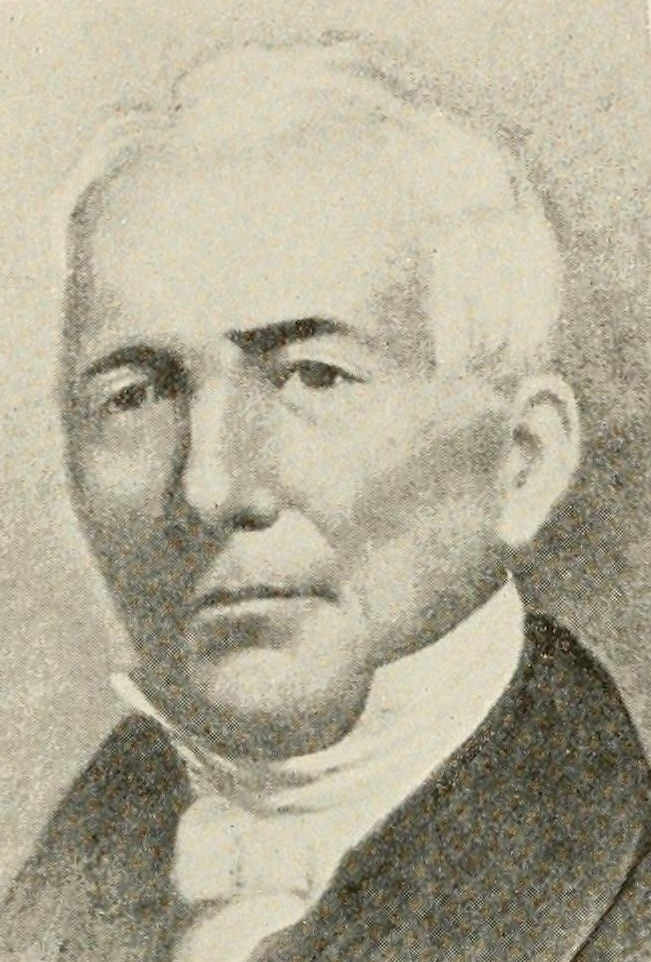
- Jonathan Hatch Hubbard, Congressman from Vermont

Member of the U.S. House of Representatives from Vermont's 2nd district
- In office March 4, 1809 – March 3, 1811
- Preceded by: James Elliot
- Succeeded by: William Strong

Personal details
- Born: May 7, 1768 Tolland, Connecticut Colony, British America
- Died: September 20, 1849 (aged 81) Windsor, Vermont, U.S.
- Party: Federalist
- Spouse: Elizabeth Hastings
- Children: Marie E. Hubbard
- Profession: law, congressman

Jonathan Hatch Hubbard (May 7, 1768 – September 20, 1849) was an American lawyer and politician. He served as a U.S. representative from Vermont.

== Biography ==
Hubbard was born in Tolland in the Connecticut Colony. At the age of eleven Hubbard moved with his parents to Claremont, New Hampshire. He was instructed by a private tutor. Hubbard studied law in Charlestown, New Hampshire, and was admitted to the bar in 1790. He commenced practice in Windsor, Vermont. Hubbard married Elizabeth Hastings in 1793 and they had one child, Marie E. Hubbard.

Hubbard was elected as a Federalist to the Eleventh Congress and served from March 4, 1809, to March 3, 1811. He was an unsuccessful candidate for reelection to the Twelfth Congress in 1810. Hubbard served as justice of the Vermont Supreme Court from 1813 to 1815. After serving as justice, Hubbard resumed the practice of law.

== Death ==
Hubbard died on September 20, 1849, in Windsor, Vermont.

U.S. House of Representatives
Preceded by James Elliot	Member of the U.S. House of Representatives from Vermont's 2nd congressional district 1809–1811	Succeeded by William Strong
