= Frank Plumley =

American politician (1844-1924)

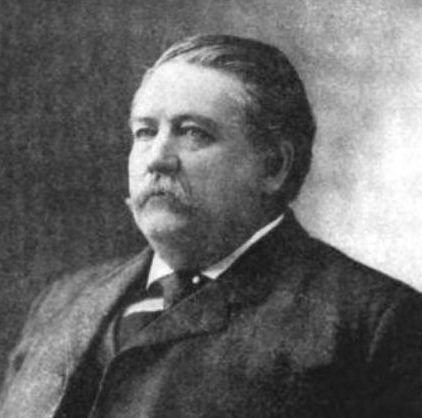
- Plumley in 1905

Member of the United States House of Representatives from Vermont's 2nd district
- In office March 4, 1909 – March 3, 1915
- Preceded by: Kittredge Haskins
- Succeeded by: Porter H. Dale

Chief Judge of the Vermont Court of Claims
- In office 1904–1908
- Preceded by: Horace F. Graham
- Succeeded by: Position abolished

Judge of the Vermont Court of Claims
- In office 1902–1904
- Preceded by: Newly created
- Succeeded by: Linus Leavens

President pro tempore of the Vermont State Senate
- In office 1894–1896
- Preceded by: Alfred A. Hall
- Succeeded by: Ashbel A. Dean

United States Attorney for the District of Vermont
- In office 1889–1894
- President: Benjamin Harrison; Grover Cleveland
- Preceded by: Clarence H. Pitkin
- Succeeded by: John H. Senter

Member of the Vermont House of Representatives
- In office 1882–1882

State's Attorney for Washington County, Vermont
- In office 1876–1880
- Preceded by: William P. Dillingham
- Succeeded by: Clarence H. Pitkin

Personal details
- Born: December 17, 1844 Eden, Vermont, US
- Died: April 30, 1924 (aged 79) Northfield, Vermont, US
- Party: Republican
- Spouse: Lavinia Lucretia Smith Fletcher Plumley
- Children: Charles Albert Plumley and Theodora May Plumley
- Education: University of Michigan Law School
- Profession: Politician, Lawyer

Frank Plumley (December 17, 1844 – April 30, 1924) was an American politician and lawyer from Vermont. He served as United States district attorney and U.S. Representative from Vermont.

== Early life and career ==
Plumley was born in Eden, Vermont, son of William Plumley and Eliza Little. He attended the public schools and People's Academy in Morrisville, Vermont. Plumley taught school and studied law in Morrisville. He graduated from the University of Michigan Law School and was admitted to the bar in Lamoille County in May 1869. He began the practice of law in Northfield.

Plumley held many positions in state and federal government. He served as the state's attorney of Washington County from 1876 to 1880. He served in the Vermont House of Representatives (1882), and was chairman of the Republican State convention in 1886. In 1888 Plumley was a delegate to the Republican National Convention.

He was appointed lecturer of constitutional law at Norwich University in 1884 and was named a trustee of the university in 1888. In 1892 Norwich awarded Plumley the honorary degree of Master of Arts.

He served as the United States district attorney for the district of Vermont from 1889 to 1894. In 1894 he served in the Vermont State Senate and was elected President pro tempore. Plumley was a member of the Vermont Court of Claims from 1902 to 1904 and chief justice from 1904 to 1908.

In 1903 President Theodore Roosevelt appointed him as umpire of the mixed commissions of Great Britain and Venezuela, and the Netherlands and Venezuela, sitting in Caracas. In 1905, he was selected by France and Venezuela as umpire in the French-Venezuela mixed commission, which sat in Northfield, Vermont. This is the only instance where an American not serving in a high official office was chosen by these countries to arbitrate the differences between them. Plumley was again a trustee of Norwich University in 1905. Plumley received the honorary degree of LL.D. from Norwich in 1905 and from the University of Vermont in 1909.

In 1909 Plumley was elected to the United States House of Representatives as a Republican. He was reelected twice and served from March 4, 1909, to March 3, 1915. He was one of the four delegates from the U.S. Congress to the Inter-Parliamentary Union of the World in Geneva in 1912. He declined to be a candidate for renomination in 1914.

== Personal life ==
Plumley married Lavinia Lucretia Smith Fletcher on August 9, 1871. They had two children Charles Albert Plumley and Theodora May Plumley. Their son Charles Albert Plumley was a President of Norwich University who also served in the United States House of Representatives.

== Death ==
After serving in Congress, Plumley resumed the practice of law in Northfield, Vermont in partnership with his son Charles and Murdock A. Campbell. He died on April 30, 1924, and is interred in Mount Hope Cemetery in Northfield.

U.S. House of Representatives
Preceded by Kittredge Haskins	Member of the U.S. House of Representatives from Vermont's 2nd congressional district 1909-1915	Succeeded by Porter H. Dale
