= Royall Tyler =

American judge (1757–1826)

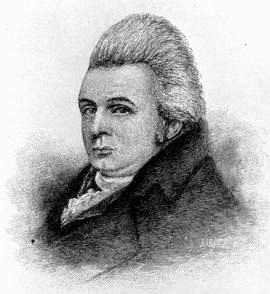
- Born: June 18, 1757; Boston, Province of Massachusetts Bay, British America
- Died: August 26, 1826 (aged 69); Brattleboro, Vermont, United States
- Resting place: Brattleboro's Prospect Hill Cemetery
- Education: Roxbury Latin School; Harvard University
- Occupations: Jurist; militiaman; playwright
- Spouse: Mary Palmer
- Children: 11

Royall Tyler (June 18, 1757 – August 26, 1826) was an American jurist, teacher and playwright. He was born in Boston, graduated from Harvard University in 1776, and then served in the Massachusetts militia during the American Revolution. He was admitted to the bar in 1780, became a lawyer, and fathered eleven children. In 1801, he was appointed a Justice of the Vermont Supreme Court. He wrote a play, The Contrast, which was produced in 1787 in New York City, shortly after George Washington's inauguration. It is considered the first American comedy. Washington attended the production, which was well-received, and Tyler became a literary celebrity.

== Early life ==
Born in Boston, Massachusetts, on June 18, 1757, he was the son of wealthy merchant and political figure Royall Tyler (died 1771) and Mary (Steele) Tyler. He attended Boston Latin School and Harvard University, where he earned a reputation as a quick-witted joker. His roommate at Harvard was Christopher Gore.

== Military service ==
After graduating from Harvard in 1776, Tyler briefly served in the Massachusetts militia during the American Revolution, including taking part in John Hancock's Rhode Island expedition.

== Start of career ==
In late 1778, he began to study law with Francis Dana. He was admitted to the bar in 1780 and practiced in Portland, Maine, before moving to Braintree, Massachusetts.

In Braintree Tyler lodged with Mary and Richard Cranch. Mary Cranch was the sister of Abigail Adams, and Tyler soon met John Quincy Adams, with whom he became friendly, and Abigail ("Nabby"), whom he courted. Tyler had developed a reputation as a profligate while in college, supposedly squandering half his inheritance on parties, in grog shops and pursuing women after the death of his father. In a letter to her husband John Adams, Abigail noted that despite having "a sprightly fancy, a warm imagination and an agreeable person," Tyler was "rather negligent in pursueing (sic) his business ... and dissipated two or 3 more years of his Life and too much of his fortune to reflect upon with pleasure; all of which he now laments but cannot recall." John Quincy Adams apparently enjoyed Tyler's company, but questioned his integrity and did not think him suitable marriage material. Nabby Adams eventually ended the relationship, to the approval of her parents and brother.

Tyler served again in the militia in 1787, as aide de camp to Benjamin Lincoln during the suppressing of Shays's Rebellion. After the rebels fled he was dispatched to Vermont to negotiate for the arrest of the rebels.

Tyler was friendly with Joseph Pearce Palmer (a son of the Revolutionary War brigadier general Joseph Palmer) and Palmer's wife Elizabeth Hunt, and resided in their Boston boarding house. In 1796 Tyler married their daughter Mary, who was eighteen years younger, and they moved to Guilford, Vermont. They moved to Brattleboro in 1801, and were the parents of eleven children: Royall (Born 1794, died in college); John (b. 1796); Mary (b. 1798); Edward (b. 1800); William (b. 1802); Joseph (b. 1804); Amelia (b. 1807); George (b. 1809); Charles Royall (b. 1812); Thomas (b. 1815); and Abiel (1818–1832). Several Tyler children had prominent careers, including four who became members of the clergy.

Mary Palmer Tyler lived to age 91. She died in Brattleboro on July 13, 1866, and was buried next to her husband.

== Later career ==
A Federalist, Tyler served as Windham County State's Attorney. In 1801, he was appointed a Justice of the Vermont Supreme Court, even though the Vermont House of Representatives was controlled by the Democratic-Republican Party. In 1807 he became Chief Justice, and served until 1812.

In 1812 he ran unsuccessfully for the United States Senate as a Democratic-Republican, losing the legislative election because by then the Federalists controlled Vermont General Assembly.

From 1811 to 1814 Tyler was a Professor of Jurisprudence at the University of Vermont.

From 1815 to 1821 he was Windham County's Register of Probate.

== Career as author ==
In 1787, his comedy The Contrast was performed in New York City, the first American comedy to be performed by professional actors. The play's first public showing was shortly after George Washington's inauguration and Washington and several members of the First Congress attended. The play was well-received, and Tyler became a literary celebrity.

Tyler continued to write, and frequently collaborated with his friend Joseph Dennie, including co-writing a satirical column which appeared in Dennie's newspaper The Farmer's Weekly Museum. He published The Algerine Captive in 1797 and wrote several legal tracts, six plays, a musical drama, two long poems, many essays, and a semifictional travel narrative, 1809's The Yankey in London.

== Bibliography ==
- The Contrast (1787)
- May Day in Town, or New York in an Uproar (1787)
- The Algerine Captive (1797)
- The Georgia Spec: Or, Land in the Moon (1797)
- The Yankey in London (1809)
- Four Plays "The Island of Barrataria","The Origin of the Feast of Purim","Joseph and His Brethren", and "The Judgement of Solomon." (1941)
- The Bay Boy (1824-1826)
- The Chestnut Tree (1824-1826)
- The Medium: Or, The Happy Tea-Party (pr. 1795)
- The Farm House: Or, The Female Duellists (pr. 1796)
- The Georgia Spec
- Epigram on Seeing a Pair of Scales
- A Fable
- A Hymn for Fast Day
- The Inimitable Fair
- The Island of Barratavia
- Joseph and His Brethren
- The Judgment of Solomon
- Julian Antonius
- A Love Song
- The Mantle of Washington
- Marriage
- Moral Tales
- Newsmonger
- Ode to Night
- An Oration
- Origin of the Feast of Purim
- Prologue
- Utile Dulci (1824-1826)

Published Posthumously:

- The Verse of Royall Tyler. Collected and edited by Marius B. Peladeau.
- The Prose of Royall Tyler. Collected and edited by Marius B. Peladeau.

== Personal life ==
In later life Royall Tyler admitted to his youthful arrogance and profligate conduct, but said he regretted only the limitations which his past placed upon his career and later ambitions.

He was believed to have fathered a child with Katharine Morse, the cleaning woman in the Harvard College buildings when Tyler was a student. This son, Royal Morse, was born in 1779 and came to public attention as a leader of the 1834 anti-Catholic riots in Cambridge.

According to Palmer family descendants, Tyler fathered one daughter, and possibly two, with his landlady and mother-in-law Elizabeth Palmer while her husband, Joseph Pearse Palmer was away. The girls were Sophia, born in 1786, and Catherine, born in 1791.

Tyler was accused of starting a sexual relationship with Mary Palmer before she was old enough to marry. In her version of events, her neighbors believed that she was pregnant before she married Royall Tyler because the neighbors did not know that they had married in secret.

== Death and burial ==
Tyler died in Brattleboro, Vermont, on August 26, 1826, as the result of facial cancer that he had suffered from for ten years. He was buried in Brattleboro's Prospect Hill Cemetery.

== Legacy ==
Tyler has been identified as the model for Jaffrey Pyncheon in Nathaniel Hawthorne's The House of the Seven Gables. Hawthorne's wife Sophia Peabody was a daughter of Nathaniel Peabody and Elizabeth “Eliza” Palmer, and a granddaughter of Joseph Pearce Palmer and Elizabeth Hunt. The Palmer family preserved stories of Tyler's sexual misbehavior as a young man, some of which were known to Hawthorne, and which he used in his novel.

The main theater at the University of Vermont is named for him.

His great-grandson Royall Tyler (1884–1953) was a prominent historian.

His descendant Royall Tyler (born 1936) is a well known scholar and translator of Japanese literature.

== Additional sources ==
- Carson, Ada Lou, "Thomas Pickman Tyler's 'Memoirs of Royall Tyler': An Annotated Edition," University of Minnesota Ph.D. (University Microfilms), 1985.
- Carson, Ada Lou and Herbert L. Carson, "Royall Tyler," Twayne Publishers: 1979.
- Lauter, Paul, Ed. The Heath Anthology of American Literature. Vol. 1. 4th ed. Houghton Mifflin Co.: Boston, 2002.
- Dame, Frederick William, Roots of American Character Identity, Volume 2, Chapter 9: The Role of the American Dramatist-Jurist Royall Tyler (1757-1826) in Developing American National Identity (pages 261-325), The Edwin Mellen Press, Lewiston NY: 2009.
