= Elections in Vermont =

Elections in Vermont are authorized under Chapter II of the Vermont State Constitution, articles 43–49, which establishes elections for the state level officers, cabinet, and legislature. Articles 50–53 establish the election of county-level officers.

Elections are regulated under state statute, Title 17. The office of the Vermont Secretary of State has an Elections Division that oversees the execution of elections under state law.

According to a ranking by the Electoral Integrity Project in 2018, Vermont ranked first among U.S. states in terms of electoral integrity. It scored 83 out of 100, its highest score being in the electoral procedures and results section (93) and lowest in the voter registration section (70).

In a 2020 study, Vermont was ranked as the 9th easiest state for citizens to vote in.

== Administration ==
The U.S. state of Vermont holds its state general elections on the first Tuesday after the first Monday in November (better known as Election Day) in even-numbered years. As a result of this, general elections in Vermont systematically coincide with the biennial Elections in the United States.

Vermont has 150 seats in its House of Representatives, and 30 seats in its Senate.

If the election has an apparent loser, behind by 2% or less of the total votes cast, may request a recount.

Immediately after an election, the poll officers in each town or city tally the ballots and municipal clerks report totals to the Vermont Secretary of State and the respective county clerk. County clerks would be involved in official recounts under the jurisdiction of the Superior Court.

Individuals may hold two or more sub-county-level offices concurrently should they win election to such. Countywide, legislature and higher officeholders may hold no more than one concurrent municipal-level office.

=== Election cycle ===
During November general elections in Vermont, elections are held for the positions of governor, lieutenant governor, secretary of state, treasurer, attorney general, auditor of accounts, state senator, state representative, state's attorney, assistant judge, probate judge, sheriff, high bailiff and justice of the peace, as well as occasional ballot questions and referendums. Officials elected to these offices are elected for a term of two or four years.

Parties internally reorganize every two years by holding state, county, and town committee elections during odd-numbered off-years.

==== State level ====
Vermont's governor, lieutenant governor, and other statewide executive officials are elected at-large. Two or three state senators are elected per county (except Chittenden which has six, Grand Isle which has one, and Orleans and Essex, which share two). One or two state representatives are elected per district.

==== County level ====
Countywide officials, including state's attorneys, judges, and sheriffs, are elected at-large per county every four years, and 3, 5, 7, 10, 12, or 15 county-level justices are elected per town, determined by population, or 15 per city.

==== Municipal level ====
Mayors, deputy or assistant mayors, city councilors, ward clerks, and inspectors of elections are elected on 2- or 3-year cycles by city, of which Vermont has 8. For towns and villages, municipal-level officials, including town clerks, town managers, moderators, selectboard members, town auditors, listers, grand jurors, constables, bailiffs, and trustees, are elected separately during town meetings on the first Tuesday after the first Monday in March.

Extended content

Cycles for elected office in Vermont
Election year	Federal office	Governor/lt. governor	Statewide executive	State senator	State rep.	States attorney	Assistant judge	Probate judge	Sheriff	High bailiff	Justice of the peace	Mayor/dept. mayor	City councilor	Party committees	Town clerk	Town manager	Selectboard, auditor & lister	Other town officer	Constable	Bailiff/trustee	School board
Presidential	At-large	At-large	At-large	2–3/county	1–2/ district	No election	No election	No election	No election	1/county	15/city, 3–12/town	Some cities	5–12/some cities	Special elections only	Town meeting	Town meeting	1/3 town meeting	Some towns	Some towns	1–5/town	Some school districts
Off-year A	No election	No election	No election	No election	No election	No election	No election	No election	No election	No election	No election	Some cities	5–12/some cities	State, county, & town	Town meeting	Town meeting	2/3 town meeting	Most towns	Applicable towns	1–5/town	All
Midterm	Some	At-large	At-large	2–3/county	1–2/ district	1/county	2/county	1/county	1/county	1/county	15/city, 3–12/town	Some cities	5–12/some cities	Special elections only	Town meeting	Town meeting	3/3 town meeting	Some towns	Some towns	1–5/town	Some school districts
Off-year B	No election	No election	No election	No election	No election	No election	No election	No election	No election	No election	No election	Some cities	5–12/some cities	State, county, & town	Town meeting	Town meeting	1/3 town meeting	Most towns	Applicable towns	1–5/town	All

=== Criteria for election ===
Vermont's Constitution requires that a gubernatorial or other statewide candidate achieve a majority of the popular vote (i.e. more than 50%) in order to be elected. If a candidate does not receive a majority of the vote, the General Assembly (state legislature) chooses from the three candidates who received the most votes. This has happened twenty times in Vermont history. Twice in the 18th century, fourteen times in the 19th century, three times in the 20th century, and once in the 21st century.

== Primaries ==
Both the Vermont secretary of state and the chairperson of the state committee of each major party certifies primary elections under Vermont Statutes, Title 17, Chapter 51, article 2592.

Currently, the Democratic, Progressive, Liberty Union, and Republican parties are qualified to hold primary elections in the state.

== History ==
Gubernatorial election results
Year	Democratic	Republican
1950	25.5% 22,227	74.5% 64,915
1952	39.8% 60,051	51.9% 78,338
1954	47.7% 54,554	52.3% 59,778
1956	42.5% 65,420	57.5% 88,379
1958	49.7% 61,503	50.3% 62,222
1960	43.6% 71,755	56.4% 92,861
1962	50.5% 61,350	49.5% 60,035
1964	64.9% 106,611	34.4% 56,485
1966	57.7% 78,669	42.3% 57,577
1968	44.5% 71,656	55.5% 89,387
1970	43.0% 66,028	57.0% 87,458
1972	55.3% 104,533	43.6% 82,491
1974	56.5% 79,842	38.1% 53,672
1976	40.4% 75,262	53.4% 99,268
1978	34.1% 42,482	62.8% 78,181
1980	36.6% 76,826	58.7% 123,229
1982	44.0% 74,394	55.0% 93,111
1984	50.0% 116,938	48.5% 113,264
1986	47.0% 92,485	38.2% 75,239
1988	55.3% 134,558	43.3% 105,319
1990	46.0% 97,321	51.8% 109,540
1992	74.7% 213,523	23.0% 65,837
1994	68.7% 145,661	19.0% 40,292
1996	70.5% 179,544	22.5% 57,161
1998	55.7% 121,425	41.1% 89,726
2000	50.5% 148,059	38.0% 111,359
2002	42.4% 97,565	44.9% 103,436
2004	37.9% 117,327	58.7% 181,540
2006	41.2% 108,090	56.4% 148,014
2008	21.8% 69,534	53.4% 170,492
2010	49.5% 119,543	47.7% 115,212
2012	57.8% 170,598	37.6% 110,940
2014	46.4% 89,509	45.1% 87,075
2016	44.2% 139,253	52.9% 166,817
2018	40.3% 110,335	55.2% 151,261
2020	27.4% 99,214	68.5% 248,412
2022	24.0% 68,248	71.0% 202,147
2024	21.8% 79,217	73.4% 266,439

=== Voting patterns ===
Electorally, Republicans predominated for most of the state's history until the 1960s, even when the rest of the country was voting Democratic. Democrats started to become competitive in the 1970s, and have predominated at the polls since the 1990s. As a result, Vermont has sometimes voted contrarian in national elections. In 1832, Vermont was the only state voting for a presidential candidate from the Anti-Masonic Party. It was only one of two states to vote for William Howard Taft in 1912, and Vermont and Maine were the only states to vote against Franklin D. Roosevelt in all four of his successful presidential campaigns.

In 1955, voters elected Consuelo N. Bailey to be lieutenant governor, the first woman to be elected to that position in the country. Prior to 1915, Vermont held its general election in September. Because it was one of the earliest elections in the nation, it was carefully followed. National politicians campaigned in the state in the summer to influence the turnout, including Ulysses S. Grant, William McKinley and Theodore Roosevelt. While the vote was assured for the Republican party at that time, the size of victory was thought by some, before polls, to predict how the national elections might go.

Republicans dominated Vermont elections from the party's founding in 1854 until the mid-1970s. From 1856 to 1988, Vermont voted Republican in every presidential election with only one exception in 1964. Vermont consecutively had Republican governors for over a century until Democrat Phillip Hoff was elected in 1962. Prior to the 1960s, rural interests dominated the legislature. As in the early 1960s, many progressive Vermont Republicans and newcomers from New York state helped bolster the state's small Democratic Party. However, since 1962, no successive governor has been from the same party as their predecessor.

By 1970, the population of those aged between 18 and 34 increased by half, owing to in-migration. Many of those were hippies or had a more liberal outlook than existing residents. The state grew from 444,732 in 1970 to 511,456 in 1980, the largest increase since the Civil War. 59% of this growth was from out of state.

In 1980, Vermont gave independent candidate John B. Anderson 15% of its vote, thereby tipping the state to Republican Ronald Reagan.

Since 1992, Vermont had supported a Democrat for president in every election, and by double-digit margins all but once (in 2000). Republicans have not seriously contested the state since then, and Vermont is now reckoned as part of the "Blue Wall." Vermont gave John Kerry his fourth-largest margin of victory in 2004, behind the District of Columbia, Massachusetts, and Rhode Island. He won the state's popular vote by 20 percentage points over incumbent George W. Bush, taking 58.9% of the vote. Essex County in the state's northeastern section was the only county to vote for Bush. Vermont still remains the only state that President Bush has not visited. On the other hand, Republican governor Douglas won all counties but Windham in the 2006 election. Vermonters have been ticket-splitters. Underlining how Republican Vermont once was, Donald Trump and George W. Bush are the only Republicans to win the White House without carrying Vermont. The 2020 election, was the first time the state was the most Democratic in the nation.

=== Recent elections ===
Vermont's 2006 state general election was held on November 7, 2006. The state's last state primary election was held on September 12, 2006.

In 2008, the Democrats, in charge of the House, appointed Richard Westman, a Republican, to chair the Transportation Committee. When he resigned in 2009 to accept a post elsewhere, the leadership appointed another Republican, Patrick M. Brennan to that chair.

In 2008, an Associated Press poll found that Vermonters self-described themselves as "liberal" (32%) more often than any other state in the union, behind only the District of Columbia. In 2009, the state had a Cook Partisan Voting Index of D+13, tying with Hawaii to be the most Democratic state in the country, exceeded only by the District of Columbia.

In January 2010 nine Vermonters announced they were planning to run for several state offices: governor, lieutenant governor and seven seats in the state Senate on a Vermont secession platform. The candidates did not organize a formal political party organization but are running as individuals under the "Vermont Independence Party" label.

== Political parties in Vermont ==
Political party affiliation was not a factor in Vermont politics from 1778 to 1797. Starting in 1798, leading politicians were members of the Democratic-Republican Party until about 1830. Thereafter, Anti-Masonic Party, National Republican Party, and Whig Party politicians held sway until 1855.

Starting in 1854, the state voted solidly Republican until 1962. Starting in 1963, the governor's office alternated between the Democratic and Republican parties with each election. In 1987, the Democratic Party captured both chambers of the legislature. Since 1987, Vermont House and Senate have each been Democratic for all but two of the eleven terms between then and 2013. For many years, Vermont was a stronghold of the Republican Party.

In the late 1980s, the Progressive Party was formed, and began electing candidates to local and statewide offices. Some candidates ran for office with the nomination of both the Progressive and Democratic Parties, although this was sometimes avoided for fear of the Progressives getting simply absorbed into the larger Democratic Party. With the exception of the more conservative and rural Northeast Kingdom, Rutland County, and Bennington County, the Progressive and Democratic Parties have become the two dominant political forces, with the Republican Party being relegated to third ever since its loss in popularity in the state since the 1980s onward. The success of the party led to it becoming the most successful third party in any US state, and secured Vermont as a multi-party political environment.

Other contemporary parties operating in Vermont include the Liberty Union Party (1970), Libertarian Party (1972), and Green Mountain Party (2015).

=== Political parties ===
Vermont law requires political parties to reorganize in every odd-numbered year by electing members at town caucuses and then sending representatives to county committees, which send representatives to the state committee meeting. Statute exempts minor parties from holding county meetings. The Vermont Secretary of State maintains a list of designated major and minor parties.

Major political parties in Vermont

- Democratic
- Progressive
- Republican

Minor political parties in Vermont

- Liberty Union
- Libertarian
- Green Mountain Party

The Vermont Progressive Party is a progressive, liberal, populist, left-wing political party that currently holds 6 seats in the Vermont legislature. Since 1990, it has run candidates for numerous state and local elections. Progressives Peter Clavelle and Bob Kiss were mayors of the largest city, Burlington from 1989–1993, 1995–2006, and 2006–2012, respectively. It formed as a coalition closely associated with then Burlington mayor Bernie Sanders in the late 1980s and has had official recognition as a major political party by the state government since 1999.

As of 2013, the Vermont Libertarian Party had two elected municipal officials.

In 2010 the Liberty Union Party, a long-time Vermont democratic socialist party, fielded nine candidates in statewide elections.

=== Federal officials ===
Vermont is one of only three states represented by a member of the United States Congress who does not currently associate with a political party: Senator Bernie Sanders describes himself as a socialist and progressive, but caucuses with the Democrats in the selection of the Senate leadership. He was a member of the United States House of Representatives from 1991 to 2007 when he was elected to the U.S. Senate. Sanders often votes with the Democratic Party, but maintains his status as an independent in Congress. He is the only member of the Congressional Progressive Caucus in the Senate and was its first chair from 1991 to 1999. He is heavily supported during campaigns in his home state by the Progressive Party and the Democratic Party, though Sanders declines both parties' official nomination.

Peter Welch is the state's Democratic senator since 2023.

Becca Balint has represented Vermont in the House since 2023, replacing Peter Welch.

== See also ==
- Government of Vermont
- Politics of Vermont
- Voter's oath or affirmation
- Elections in the United States
- Political party strength in Vermont
- 2026 Vermont elections
- Gubernatorial elections by year:
  - 2000 Vermont gubernatorial election
  - 2004 Vermont gubernatorial election
  - 2006 Vermont gubernatorial election
  - 2008 Vermont gubernatorial election
  - 2010 Vermont gubernatorial election
  - 2012 Vermont gubernatorial election
  - 2016 Vermont gubernatorial election
- US House of Representatives elections by year:
  - 2000 United States House of Representatives election in Vermont
  - 2006 United States House of Representatives election in Vermont
  - 2008 United States House of Representatives election in Vermont
  - 2010 United States House of Representatives election in Vermont
  - 2012 United States House of Representatives election in Vermont
  - 2014 United States House of Representatives election in Vermont
  - 2016 United States House of Representatives election in Vermont
- US Senate elections by year:
  - 2004 United States Senate election in Vermont
  - 2006 United States Senate election in Vermont
  - 2010 United States Senate election in Vermont
  - 2012 United States Senate election in Vermont
  - 2016 United States Senate election in Vermont
- Other Vermont elections by year:
  - 2006 Vermont elections
  - 2008 Vermont elections
  - 2010 Vermont elections
  - 2012 Vermont elections
  - 2014 Vermont elections
  - 2016 Vermont elections
- United States presidential elections in Vermont
- Presidential elections by year:
  - 2000 United States presidential election in Vermont
  - 2004 United States presidential election in Vermont
  - 2008 United States presidential election in Vermont
  - 2012 United States presidential election in Vermont
  - 2016 United States presidential election in Vermont

== Notes ==
- As of the 2014 elections

== External references ==
- Elections Division at the Vermont Secretary of State official website
  - Vermont Election Information and Resources
- Vermont at Ballotpedia
- Government Documents Round Table of the American Library Association, "Vermont", Voting & Elections Toolkits
- "Vermont: Election Tools, Deadlines, Dates, Rules, and Links", Vote.org, Oakland, CA
- "League of Women Voters of Vermont". (state affiliate of the U.S. League of Women Voters)
- "State Elections Legislation Database", Ncsl.org, Washington, D.C.: National Conference of State Legislatures, "State legislation related to the administration of elections introduced in 2011 through this year, 2020"
