= J. Harold Stacey =

American politician

Member of the Vermont Senate from Windsor County
- In office 1955–1957 Serving with Guy H. Cleveland, Lewis E. Springer Jr.
- Preceded by: Frank C. Corliss, Susan Drown, Henry D. Vail
- Succeeded by: Guy H. Cleveland, Mark Drown, Olin Gay

Speaker of the Vermont House of Representatives
- In office 1949–1951
- Preceded by: Winston L. Prouty
- Succeeded by: Wallace M. Fay

Member of the Vermont House of Representatives from Windsor
- In office 1943–1951
- Preceded by: Harry B. Wilcox
- Succeeded by: Donald B. Hammond

Personal details
- Born: February 24, 1898 Tolland, Connecticut, U.S.
- Died: May 5, 1963 (aged 65) Hanover, New Hampshire, U.S.
- Resting place: Ascutney Cemetery, Windsor, Vermont, U.S.
- Party: Republican
- Spouse: Ethel (Bonney) Stacey (m. 1919)
- Children: 3
- Education: Dartmouth College (attended); Massachusetts Institute of Technology (attended)
- Occupation: Businessman

Military service
- Service: United States Navy
- Years of service: 1918–1919
- Rank: Ensign
- Unit: United States Naval Aviation
- Wars: World War I

J. Harold Stacey (February 24, 1898 – May 5, 1963) was a Vermont businessman and politician who served as Speaker of the Vermont House of Representatives.

== Early life ==
James Harold Stacey was born in Tolland, Connecticut, on February 24, 1898. He was raised in Royalton, Vermont, and attended Dartmouth College and the Massachusetts Institute of Technology.

Stacey joined the United States Navy for World War I, received a commission as an Ensign, and was trained as a pilot.

In 1919 Stacey settled in Windsor, Vermont, where he operated an ice, building materials and home heating business.

== Political career ==
A Republican, Stacey was elected to the Vermont House of Representatives in 1942 and served four terms, 1943 to 1951. From 1949 to 1951 Stacey was Speaker of the House.

In 1950 Stacey lost the Republican primary for governor to Lee E. Emerson, who went on to win the general election.

Stacey later served on the state Fish and Game Commission. In 1954 he was elected to the Vermont Senate and served one term, 1955 to 1957. In June 1956, Stacey was appointed to head the Vermont Development Commission.

== Public life ==
Stacey belonged to several fraternal and voluntary organizations including the Freemasonry, Benevolent and Protective Order of Elks, Rotary International, American Legion, and New England Lumberman's association. Within Freemasonry, he served as the Grand Master of the Grand Lodge of Vermont, was a 33° Scottish Rite mason, a Past Patron of Ascutney Chapter, Order of the Eastern Star, member of the Windsor Commandery, Knights Templar, and Past Potentate of Mt. Sinai Temple, Shriners.

== Later life ==
Stacey died at the hospital in Hanover, New Hampshire on May 5, 1963. He was buried at Ascutney Cemetery in Windsor.

Political offices
Preceded by Winston L. Prouty	Speaker of the Vermont House of Representatives; 1949–1951	Succeeded by Wallace M. Fay
