= Harold J. Arthur =

American politician (1904–1971)

Harold John Arthur
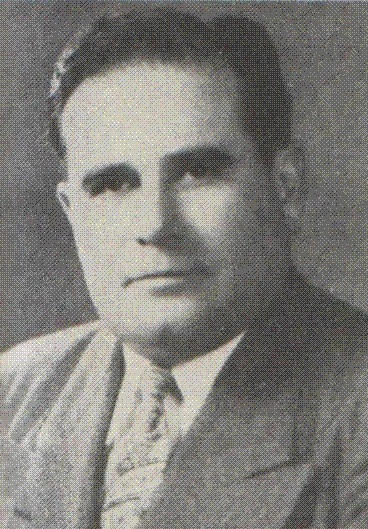

68th Governor of Vermont
- In office January 16, 1950 – January 4, 1951
- Lieutenant: Joseph B. Johnson
- Preceded by: Ernest W. Gibson Jr.
- Succeeded by: Lee E. Emerson

64th Lieutenant Governor of Vermont
- In office 1949–1950
- Governor: Ernest W. Gibson Jr.
- Preceded by: Lee E. Emerson
- Succeeded by: Joseph B. Johnson

Personal details
- Born: February 9, 1904 Whitehall, New York, US
- Died: July 19, 1971 (aged 67) Plattsburgh, New York, US
- Resting place: Lakeview Cemetery, Burlington, Vermont, US
- Party: Republican
- Spouse: Mary C. Alafat
- Education: Albany Business College; La Salle Extension University
- Profession: Attorney

Military service
- Branch/service: United States Army
- Years of service: 1928–1959
- Rank: Lieutenant Colonel
- Unit: Vermont Army National Guard
- Battles/wars: World War II

Harold John Arthur (February 9, 1904 – July 19, 1971) was an American politician who served as 68th governor of Vermont from 1950 to 1951. He also served as the 64th lieutenant governor of Vermont from 1949 to 1950.

== Early life, education, and family ==
Arthur was born in Whitehall, New York, on February 9, 1904, and raised in Addison County and Rutland County, Vermont. He graduated from Albany Business College and worked for the Brandon National Bank and in other businesses before settling in Burlington. He was married to Mary C. (Alafat) Arthur, with whom he practiced law. They were the parents of a daughter, Portia.

== Career ==
From 1927 to 1929, Arthur worked as an assistant to Governor John E. Weeks. From 1928 to 1940 he was associated with Warren R. Austin, working as a clerk and stenographer and then studying law in Austin's office. He obtained a law degree from La Salle Extension University, and then became an attorney in Burlington.

Arthur also worked for the Vermont House of Representatives for more than twenty years, rising to the position of chief clerk and parliamentarian, where he served from 1939 to 1949. He was Clerk of the House from 1939 to 1943, and again from 1947 to 1949; during his World War II military service, the position was held by Clifton G. Parker.

A member of the Vermont National Guard beginning in 1928, Arthur served in World War II and attained the rank of lieutenant colonel as a Judge Advocate General before retiring in 1959.

Arthur was the successful Republican candidate for lieutenant governor in 1948, and served from 1949 to 1950.

Arthur became governor when Ernest W. Gibson Jr. resigned to become a federal judge. He did not seek election to a full term in 1950, running unsuccessfully for the United States House of Representatives and losing the Republican primary to Winston L. Prouty, whom Arthur had defeated for the lieutenant governor nomination in 1948.

In 1954, Arthur ran unsuccessfully to be the Republican candidate for lieutenant governor, losing the primary to Consuelo N. Bailey. Governor Arthur ran again for Congress in 1958, winning the Republican nomination and losing the general election to William H. Meyer, who became the first Democratic candidate to win a statewide or national office in Vermont since the founding of the Republican Party in the 1850s.

== Death and legacy ==
Arthur died of cancer at Plattsburgh Air Force Base Hospital on July 19, 1971. He was a Unitarian, and is interred in a mausoleum at Burlington's Lakeview Cemetery.

== See also ==
- List of members of the American Legion

Party political offices
Preceded by Lee E. Emerson	Republican nominee for Lieutenant Governor of Vermont; 1948	Succeeded by Joseph B. Johnson
Political offices
Preceded by Lee E. Emerson	Lieutenant Governor of Vermont; 1949—1950	Succeeded by Joseph B. Johnson
Preceded by Ernest W. Gibson Jr.	Governor of Vermont; 1950–1951	Succeeded by Lee E. Emerson
