= 1948 Vermont gubernatorial election =

- November 2, 1948
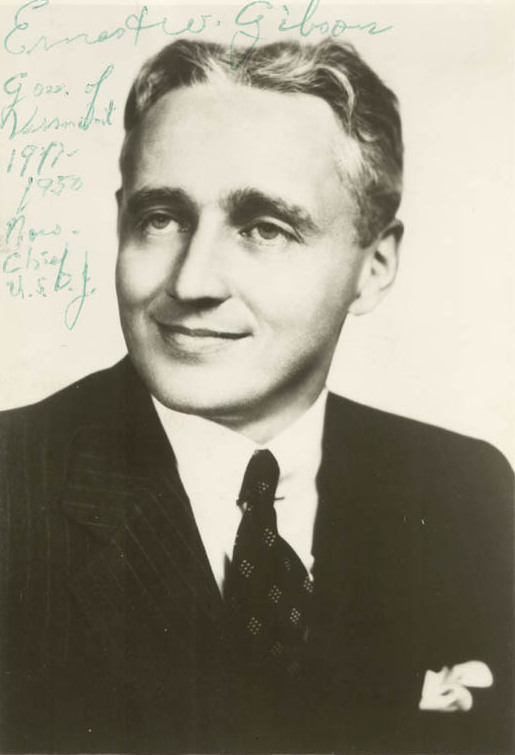

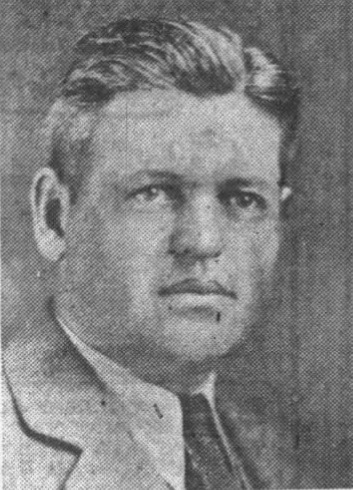
Nominee	Ernest W. Gibson Jr.	Charles F. Ryan
Party	Republican	Democratic
Popular vote	86,394	33,588
Percentage	71.88%	27.95%
- Gibson: 50–60% 60–70% 70–80% 80–90% 90-100% Ryan: 50–60% No Vote/Data
Governor before election
Ernest W. Gibson Jr.
Republican
Elected Governor
Ernest W. Gibson Jr.
Republican

The 1948 Vermont gubernatorial election took place on November 2, 1948. Incumbent Republican Ernest W. Gibson Jr. ran successfully for re-election to a second term as Governor of Vermont, defeating Democratic candidate Charles F. Ryan, a Vermont Army National Guard officer and former assistant U.S. Attorney for Vermont.

== Republican primary ==
=== Results ===
Republican primary results
Party	Candidate	Votes	%	±%
Republican	Ernest W. Gibson Jr. (inc.)	39,269	54.4	
Republican	Lee E. Emerson	32,938	45.6	
Republican	Other	2	0.0	
Total votes		72,209	100.0	

== Democratic primary ==
=== Results ===
Democratic primary results
Party	Candidate	Votes	%	±%
Democratic	Charles F. Ryan	2,648	96.3	
Democratic	Other	103	3.7	
Total votes		2,751	100.0	

== General election ==
=== Candidates ===
- Ernest W. Gibson Jr. (Republican), incumbent Governor of Vermont
- Charles F. Ryan (Democratic)

=== Results ===
1948 Vermont gubernatorial election
Party	Candidate	Votes	%	±%
Republican	Ernest W. Gibson Jr. (inc.)	86,394	71.88	
Democratic	Charles F. Ryan	33,588	27.95	
N/A	Other	201	0.17	
Total votes		120,183	100.0	
