= William H. Meyer =

American politician (1914–1983)

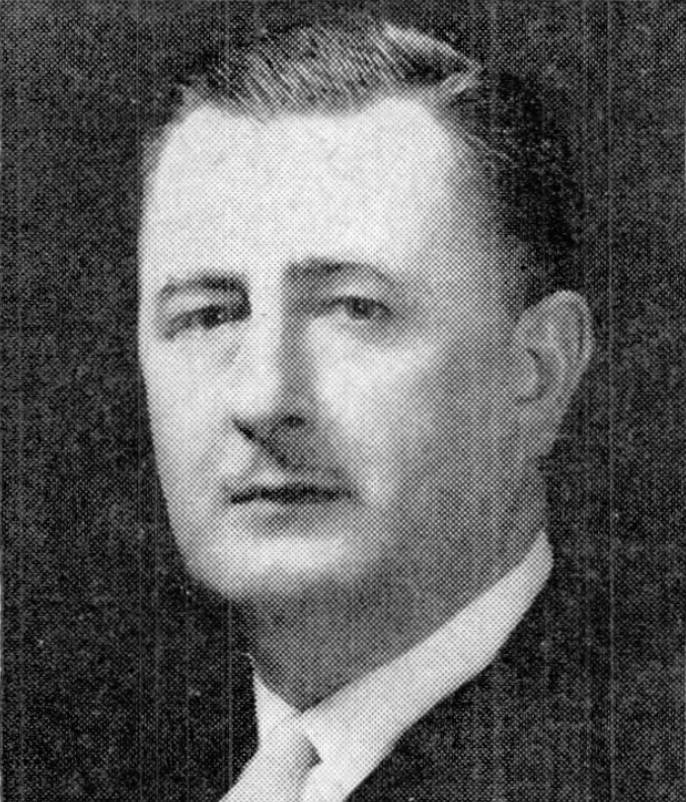

Member of the U.S. House of Representatives from Vermont's at-large district
- In office January 3, 1959 – January 3, 1961
- Preceded by: Winston L. Prouty
- Succeeded by: Robert Stafford

Personal details
- Born: William Henry Meyer; December 29, 1914 Philadelphia, Pennsylvania
- Died: December 16, 1983 (aged 68) West Rupert, Vermont
- Party: Democratic (before 1970, after 1972); Liberty Union (1970–1972)

William Henry Meyer (December 29, 1914 – December 16, 1983) was an American businessman and politician who served one term as a member of the United States House of Representatives from Vermont from 1959 to 1961.

== Biography ==
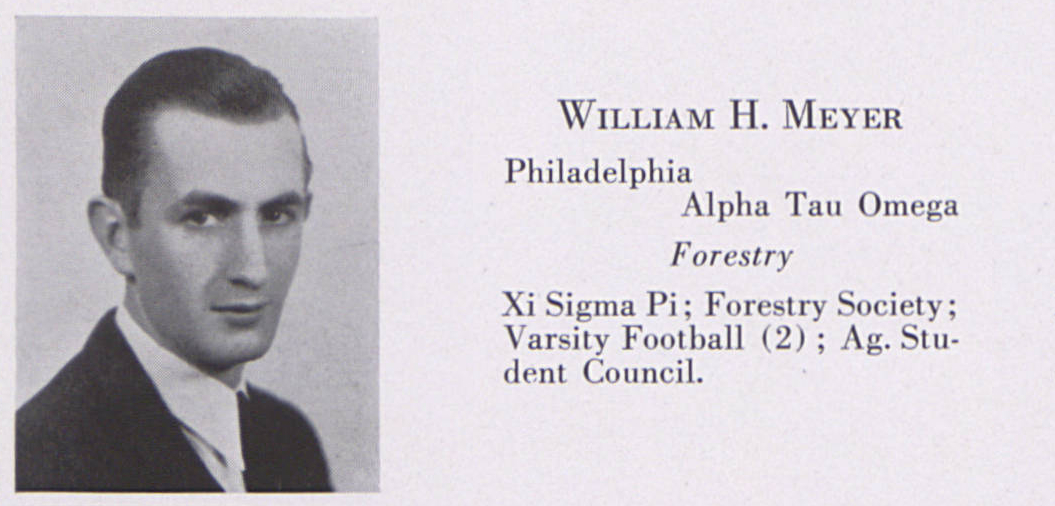
Meyer in the Pennsylvania State University yearbook, 1936

Born in Philadelphia, he attended the public schools of the city and graduated from Pennsylvania State University in 1936. He worked as a timber cruiser, state and federal forester, and Civilian Conservation Corps technician and supervisor in West Virginia, Maryland, Wisconsin and New Jersey from 1936 to 1940. He moved to a farm in Bennington County, Vermont in 1945. He worked with the Soil Conservation Service in Vermont from 1940 to 1950. In 1951, he entered private practice as a consulting forester and became executive director of the Vermont Forest and Farmland Foundation.

=== Congress ===
He was elected as a Democrat to the Eighty-sixth Congress (January 3, 1959 – January 3, 1961), narrowly defeating the Republican candidate, former Governor Harold Arthur, by about 3,600 votes. He became the first Democrat to win a statewide or Congressional election in Vermont since the 1850s, and the first Democrat to represent Vermont in the House of Representatives since Thomas Bartlett Jr., who served from 1851 to 1853. His election was attributed to a strong Republican vote against Arthur. While Meyer was the only Vermont Democrat to win in 1958, the concurrent gubernatorial election was even narrower than Meyer's race — Republican Robert Stafford defeated Democrat Bernard J. Leddy by only 781 votes.

By one measure, Meyer was the most left-wing member to serve in Congress from 1937 to 2002. He supported admission of the People's Republic of China into the United Nations, while opposing conscription and nuclear testing. He voted in favor of the Civil Rights Act of 1960.

He was an unsuccessful candidate for reelection in 1960 to the Eighty-seventh Congress, when he was defeated by Republican Governor Robert Stafford. Meyer was challenged in the Democratic primary by dairy farmer Fred Richmond, in what was the first Democratic primary in modern Vermont political history.

=== Later career ===
After leaving Congress, he served as a consultant for the Technical Review Staff of the Department of the Interior from May 1961 to December 1963.

Meyer was an unsuccessful candidate for the Democratic nomination for United States Senator in 1962, 1964 and 1970. He was a delegate to the Vermont State Democratic conventions of 1956, 1960, 1964 and 1968.

He was one of the leading founders of the nonviolent socialist Liberty Union Party of Vermont in June 1970. He was the Liberty Union nominee for United States Senator after failing to obtain the Democratic nomination that year, receiving 1,416 votes for 0.91% of the vote in the general election. He received more votes in the Democratic primary than he did in the general election.

He returned to the Democratic Party in 1972. He was an unsuccessful candidate for election that year to the Ninety-third Congress, losing to Republican incumbent Richard W. Mallary.

=== Death ===
He was a resident of West Rupert, Vermont until his death. He was cremated and had his ashes interred at his home in West Rupert.

== Family ==
His son, Karl Meyer, is a noted radical pacifist and tax resister.

== Electoral history ==
1958 U.S. House of Representatives election for Vermont's at-large district
| Party | Candidate | Votes | % | ±% |
|---|---|---|---|---|
| Democratic | William H. Meyer | 63,131 | 51.5% | +18.6% |
| Republican | Harold Arthur | 59,536 | 48.5% | −18.6% |
| Total votes | | '122,702' | '100.0%' | |

1960 Democratic primary results for Vermont's at-large district
| Party | Candidate | Votes | % | ±% |
|---|---|---|---|---|
| Democratic | William H. Meyer | 12,306 | 71.5% | |
| Democratic | Fred Richmond | 4,741 | 28.5% | |
| Democratic | Other | 16 | 0.1% | |
| Total votes | | '17,223' | '100.0%' | |

1960 U.S. House of Representatives election for Vermont's at-large district
| Party | Candidate | Votes | % | ±% |
|---|---|---|---|---|
| Republican | Robert Stafford | 94,905 | 57.2% | +8.7% |
| Democratic | William H. Meyer | 71,111 | 42.8% | −8.7% |
| Total votes | | '166,035' | '100.0%' | |

1962 Democratic primary results for U.S. Senate
| Party | Candidate | Votes | % | ±% |
|---|---|---|---|---|
| Democratic | W. Robert Johnson | 5,718 | 54.6% | |
| Democratic | William H. Meyer | 4,741 | 45.3% | |
| Democratic | Other | 13 | 0.1% | |
| Total votes | | '10,472' | '100.0%' | |

1964 Democratic primary results for U.S. Senate
| Party | Candidate | Votes | % | ±% |
|---|---|---|---|---|
| Democratic | Frederick J. Fayette | 12,388 | 71.1 | |
| Democratic | William H. Meyer | 4,913 | 28.2 | |
| Democratic | Other | 134 | 0.7 | |
| Total votes | | '17,435' | '100' | |

1970 Democratic primary results for U.S. Senate
| Party | Candidate | Votes | % | ±% |
|---|---|---|---|---|
| Democratic | Philip H. Hoff | 23,082 | 69.6 | |
| Democratic | Fiore L. Bove | 7,941 | 24.0 | |
| Democratic | William H. Meyer | 2,024 | 6.1 | |
| Democratic | Other | 87 | 0.3 | |
| Total votes | | '33,134' | '100' | |

1970 U.S. Senate election in Vermont
| Party | Candidate | Votes | % | ±% |
|---|---|---|---|---|
| Republican | Winston L. Prouty (inc.) | 91,198 | 58.88% | +8.19% |
| Democratic | Philip H. Hoff | 62,271 | 40.20% | −6.32% |
| Liberty Union | William H. Meyer | 1,416 | 0.91% | N/A |
| N/A | Other | 14 | 0.01% | N/A |
| Total votes | | '154,899' | '100.00%' | |

1972 U.S. House of Representatives election for Vermont's at-large district
| Party | Candidate | Votes | % | ±% |
|---|---|---|---|---|
| Republican | Richard W. Mallary | 120,924 | 65.0% | |
| Democratic | William H. Meyer | 186,028 | 35.0% | |
| Total votes | | '122,702' | '100.0%' | |

U.S. House of Representatives
| Preceded by Winston L. Prouty | Member of the U.S. House of Representatives from Vermont's at-large congressional district 1959–1961 | Succeeded by Robert Stafford |
