= 1970 United States Senate election in Vermont =

- November 3, 1970
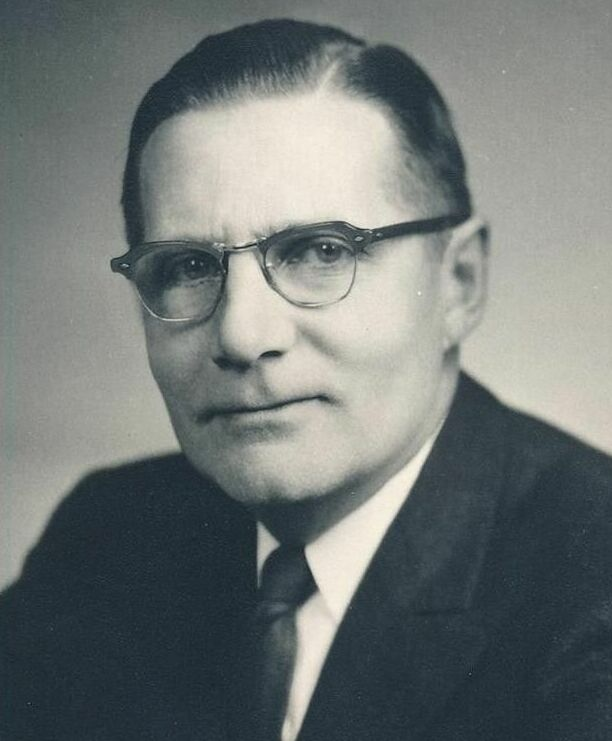

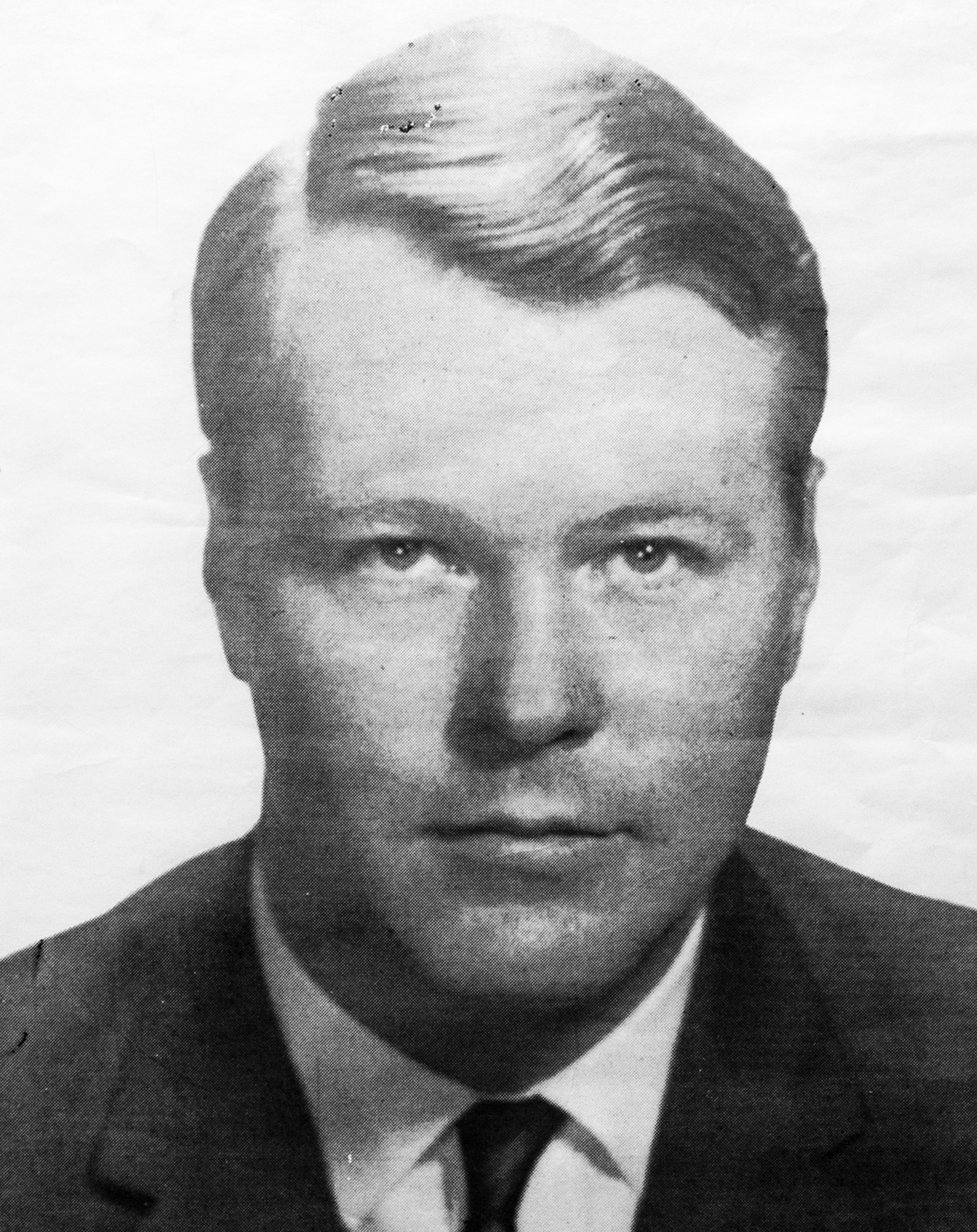
Nominee	Winston L. Prouty	Philip H. Hoff
Party	Republican	Democratic
Popular vote	91,198	62,271
Percentage	58.88%	40.20%
- Prouty: 50–60% 60–70% 70–80% 80–90% >90% Hoff: 50–60% 60–70%
U.S. senator before election
Winston L. Prouty
Republican
Elected U.S. Senator
Winston L. Prouty
Republican

The 1970 United States Senate election in Vermont took place on November 3, 1970. Incumbent Republican Winston L. Prouty successfully ran for re-election to a third term in the United States Senate, defeating Former Democratic Governor Philip H. Hoff.

== Republican primary ==
=== Results ===
Republican primary results
Party	Candidate	Votes	%	±%
Republican	Winston L. Prouty (inc.)	39,007	99.2	
Republican	Other	314	0.8	
Total votes		39,321	100.0	

== Democratic primary ==
=== Results ===
Democratic primary results
Party	Candidate	Votes	%	±%
Democratic	Philip H. Hoff	23,082	69.6	
Democratic	Fiore L. Bove	7,941	24.0	
Democratic	William H. Meyer	2,024	6.1	
Democratic	Other	87	0.3	
Total votes		33,134	100.0	

== General election ==
=== Results ===
United States Senate election in Vermont, 1970
Party	Candidate	Votes	%	±%
Republican	Winston L. Prouty (inc.)	91,198	58.88%	+8.19%
Democratic	Philip H. Hoff	62,271	40.20%	−6.32%
Liberty Union	William H. Meyer	1,416	0.91%	N/A
N/A	Other	14	0.01%	N/A
Total votes		154,899	100.00%	
