= Lee E. Emerson =

American politician (1898–1976)

Lee Earl Emerson
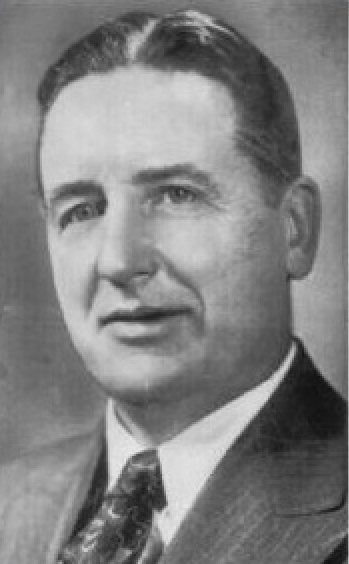

69th Governor of Vermont
- In office January 4, 1951 – January 6, 1955
- Lieutenant: Joseph B. Johnson
- Preceded by: Harold J. Arthur
- Succeeded by: Joseph B. Johnson

63rd Lieutenant Governor of Vermont
- In office 1945–1949
- Governor: Mortimer R. Proctor; Ernest W. Gibson, Jr.
- Preceded by: Mortimer R. Proctor
- Succeeded by: Harold J. Arthur

President pro tempore of the Vermont Senate
- In office 1943–1945
- Preceded by: Joseph H. Denny
- Succeeded by: John A. M. Hinsman

Member of the Vermont Senate
- In office 1943–1945 Serving with John M. Bradley
- Preceded by: Harold H. Farman, Addison W. Fletcher
- Succeeded by: John M. Bradley, Carlyle Verne Willey
- Constituency: Orleans County

Speaker of the Vermont House of Representatives
- In office 1941–1943
- Preceded by: Oscar L. Shepard
- Succeeded by: Asa S. Bloomer

Member of the Vermont House of Representatives
- In office 1939–1943
- Preceded by: Addison W. Fletcher
- Succeeded by: William Erastus Hanson
- Constituency: Barton

Personal details
- Born: December 19, 1898 Hardwick, Vermont, US
- Died: May 21, 1976 (aged 77) Berlin, Vermont, US
- Resting place: Welcome O. Brown Cemetery, Barton, Vermont
- Party: Republican
- Spouse: Dorcas Ball Emerson
- Education: Syracuse University; George Washington University Law School
- Profession: Attorney

Military service
- Service: United States Army
- Years of service: 1918
- Rank: Private
- Unit: Students' Army Training Corps, Syracuse University
- Wars: World War I

Lee Earl Emerson (December 19, 1898 – May 21, 1976) was an American politician who served in both the Vermont House of Representatives and the Vermont Senate. A member of the Republican Party, he was the 63rd lieutenant governor and the 69th governor of Vermont. When he was first elected in the 1950 Vermont gubernatorial election, he received over 70% of the vote, a feat not equaled until 1992 (by Howard Dean) and not until 2022 by a Republican (Phil Scott). Despite his success in 1950, he lost the Republican primary for U.S. Senate in Vermont in 1958 to Congressman Winston L. Prouty. He also lost the 1960 primary for Vermont's seat in the U.S. House of Representatives to incumbent Governor Robert T. Stafford.

== Early life ==
Emerson was born in Hardwick, Vermont, on December 19, 1898, and moved to Barton at the age of 16. He graduated from Barton Academy in 1917, and served in the United States Army during World War I as a member of the Students' Army Training Corps. Emerson received an A.B. from Syracuse University in 1921 and an LL.B. from George Washington University Law School in 1926. He practiced law in Barton.

== Political career ==
He was elected as a Republican to the Vermont House of Representatives in 1938 and served two terms. He was elected Speaker of the House in his second term, serving from 1941 to 1943. He was elected to the Vermont Senate in 1942, served from 1943 to 1945, and was elected President Pro Tempore. He was elected Lieutenant Governor of Vermont in 1944 and 1946, serving from 1945 to 1949.

Throughout much of Vermont's history Governors and Lieutenant Governors had served two one-year terms, and later one two-year term as part of the Republican Party's "Mountain Rule." However, Ernest W. Gibson, Jr. had successfully challenged the established structure to win the governorship in 1946. Gibson defeated Emerson in the 1948 Republican primary and went on to win reelection to a second term. Emerson's fellow conservative Harold J. Arthur succeeded Emerson as lieutenant governor. When Arthur unexpectedly became governor in 1950 after Gibson resigned to accept a federal judgeship, Arthur served out Gibson's term but declined to run for a full term himself, clearing the way for Emerson's comeback. Emerson was elected governor in 1950 and reelected in 1952, serving from 1951 to 1955. (Arthur instead ran for the U.S. House and lost the Republican primary to Winston Prouty, who went on to win the general election.)

As Governor, he recommended that Vermont citizens serving in the Korean War be paid a bonus by the state. He supported studies of the feasibility of building a natural gas pipeline for Vermont and of possible racial discrimination in the state. Also during his administration, legislation known as the Forest Act was passed, providing assistance for municipalities to establish forests.

Emerson also played a role in the Novikoff Affair, in which a tenured University of Vermont professor Alex B. Novikoff was dismissed for alleged Communist sympathies that were never substantiated.

== Post gubernatorial career ==
In 1958, he ran unsuccessfully for the United States Senate, losing the Republican nomination to Winston Prouty.

In 1960, Emerson was an unsuccessful candidate for the Republican nomination for Vermont's seat in the United States House of Representatives, losing to incumbent Governor Robert T. Stafford. Stafford went on to victory in the general election, defeating one term incumbent William H. Meyer, the first Democrat elected statewide in more than 100 years. (Myer had defeated Harold Arthur in the 1958 general election for the U.S. House seat.)

== Personal ==
Emerson married Dorcas M. Ball on August 4, 1927. They had two children, Nancy and Cynthia.

== Death and burial ==
He died in Berlin, Vermont, on May 26, 1976. He is buried at Welcome O. Brown Cemetery in Barton.

== Footnotes ==
Party political offices
Preceded by Mortimer R. Proctor	Republican nominee for Lieutenant Governor of Vermont; 1944, 1946	Succeeded by Harold J. Arthur
Preceded by Ernest W. Gibson Jr.	Republican nominee for Governor of Vermont; 1950, 1952	Succeeded by Joseph B. Johnson
Political offices
Preceded by Oscar L. Shepard	Speaker of the Vermont House of Representatives; 1941–1943	Succeeded by Asa S. Bloomer
Preceded by Joseph H. Denny	President pro tempore of the Vermont State Senate; 1943–1945	Succeeded by John A. M. Hinsman
Preceded by Mortimer R. Proctor	Lieutenant Governor of Vermont; 1945–1949	Succeeded by Harold J. Arthur
Preceded by Harold J. Arthur	Governor of Vermont; 1951–1955	Succeeded by Joseph B. Johnson
