= Ernest W. Gibson Jr. =

American attorney, politician and judge (1901–1969)

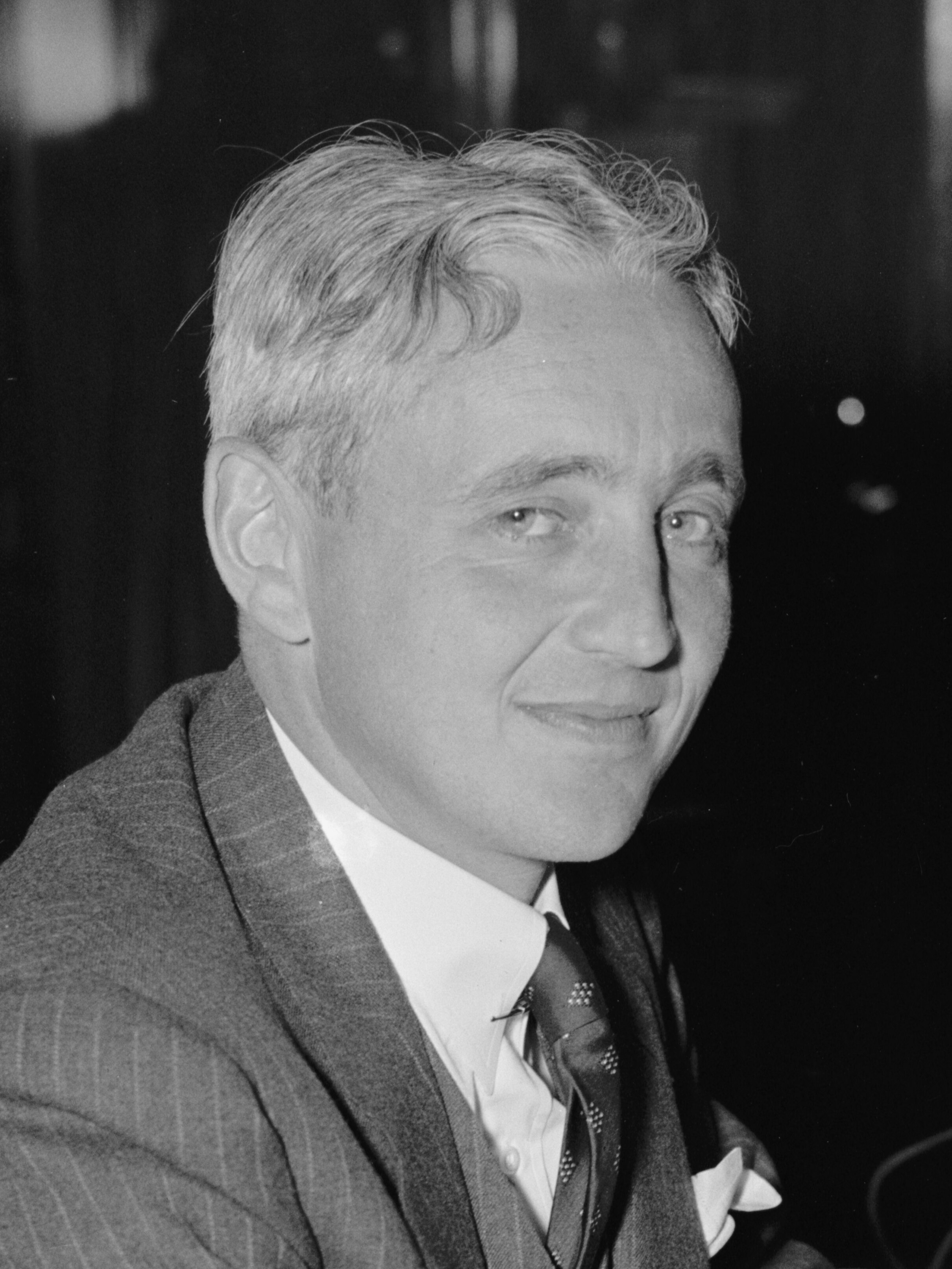

Chief Judge of the United States District Court for the District of Vermont
- In office August 25, 1966 – November 4, 1969
- Preceded by: Office established
- Succeeded by: Bernard Joseph Leddy

Judge of the United States District Court for the District of Vermont
- In office October 18, 1949 – November 4, 1969
- Appointed by: Harry S. Truman
- Preceded by: James Patrick Leamy
- Succeeded by: James L. Oakes

67th Governor of Vermont
- In office January 9, 1947 – January 16, 1950
- Lieutenant: Lee E. Emerson; Harold J. Arthur
- Preceded by: Mortimer R. Proctor
- Succeeded by: Harold J. Arthur

United States Senator from Vermont
- In office June 24, 1940 – January 3, 1941
- Appointed by: George Aiken
- Preceded by: Ernest W. Gibson
- Succeeded by: George Aiken

Secretary of the Vermont Senate
- In office February 2, 1933 – January 7, 1941
- Preceded by: Murdock A. Campbell
- Succeeded by: Willsie E. Brisbin

State's Attorney of Windham County, Vermont
- In office February 1, 1929 – January 1, 1933
- Preceded by: Roger A. Brackett
- Succeeded by: Ralph E. Edwards

Personal details
- Born: Ernest William Gibson Jr. March 6, 1901 Brattleboro, Vermont, U.S.
- Died: November 4, 1969 (aged 68) Brattleboro, Vermont, U.S.
- Resting place: Morningside Cemetery; Brattleboro, Vermont
- Party: Republican
- Spouse(s): Dorothy P. Switzer (m. 1926–1958, her death); Ann H. Haag (m. 1961–1969, his death)
- Children: 4, including Ernest III
- Parent: Ernest W. Gibson (father)
- Education: Norwich University (A.B.); George Washington University; Law School
- Profession: Attorney

Military service
- Allegiance: United States
- Branch/service: US Army; United States Army Reserve; Vermont National Guard
- Years of service: 1922–1945
- Rank: Colonel
- Unit: 43rd Infantry Division
- Battles/wars: World War II
- Awards: Silver Star; Legion of Merit; Purple Heart

Ernest William Gibson Jr. (March 6, 1901 – November 4, 1969) was an American attorney, politician, and judge. He served briefly as an appointed United States Senator, as the 67th governor of Vermont, and as a federal judge.

Born in Brattleboro and the son of a prominent Vermont political figure who served in the United States Senate, Gibson graduated from Norwich University in 1923, attended The George Washington University Law School, and attained admission to the bar in 1926. A Republican, he served in several elected and appointed positions in state government. When his father died while serving in the Senate, Gibson was appointed to fill the vacancy temporarily, and he served from June 1940 to January 1941.

A veteran of the United States Army Reserve and Vermont National Guard, Gibson served in the South Pacific and on the staff of the United States Department of War during World War II and received several decorations for heroism. In 1946, he ran for Governor of Vermont and defeated the incumbent in the Republican primary, the only time this had ever occurred in Vermont. He went on to win the general election and reelection in 1948.

Gibson served as governor until he accepted the appointment as judge of Vermont's U.S. District Court; he remained on the bench until his 1969 death in Brattleboro. He was buried at Morningside Cemetery in Brattleboro.

== Early life ==
Gibson was born on March 6, 1901, in Brattleboro, Vermont, the son of Grace Fullerton Hadley and Ernest W. Gibson, who later served in the United States House of Representatives and United States Senate. He attended the public schools and graduated from Norwich University with an Artium Baccalaureus degree in 1923, where he was a member of the Alpha chapter of the Theta Chi International Fraternity. He attended The George Washington University Law School, read law in his father's office, and was admitted to the bar in 1926. While studying law, he also taught at the New York Military Academy in Cornwall, New York, and worked as a mathematician on the United States Coast and Geodetic Survey.

=== Military service ===
Gibson was a member of the United States Army Reserve and Vermont National Guard from an early age; in 1922, he joined the National Guard's Company I, 172nd Infantry Regiment as a private. In 1924, he was appointed to command the National Guard's Troop B, 316th Cavalry Regiment with the rank of first lieutenant. In 1928, Gibson was a private first class assigned to Company I, 172nd Infantry. In 1934, he was a captain in the Organized Reserve Corps and was assigned to the 316th Cavalry. By 1937, Gibson had returned to the Vermont National Guard and served as a first lieutenant. As of 1939, Gibson was a captain serving as aide-de-camp to Leonard F. Wing, the brigadier general in command of the Vermont National Guard's 86th Infantry Brigade.

== Early career ==
Gibson began practicing law in Brattleboro in 1927. A Republican, he was State's Attorney of Windham County from 1929 to 1933; assistant secretary of the Vermont Senate from 1931 to 1933; and secretary from 1933 to 1940.

While serving on the Senate staff, Gibson was part of a network of acquaintances who were all lawyers, Republican party activists, and National Guard members. In addition to Gibson, this group included Leonard F. Wing, Harold J. Arthur, Murdock A. Campbell, and Francis William Billado.

== U.S. Senator ==
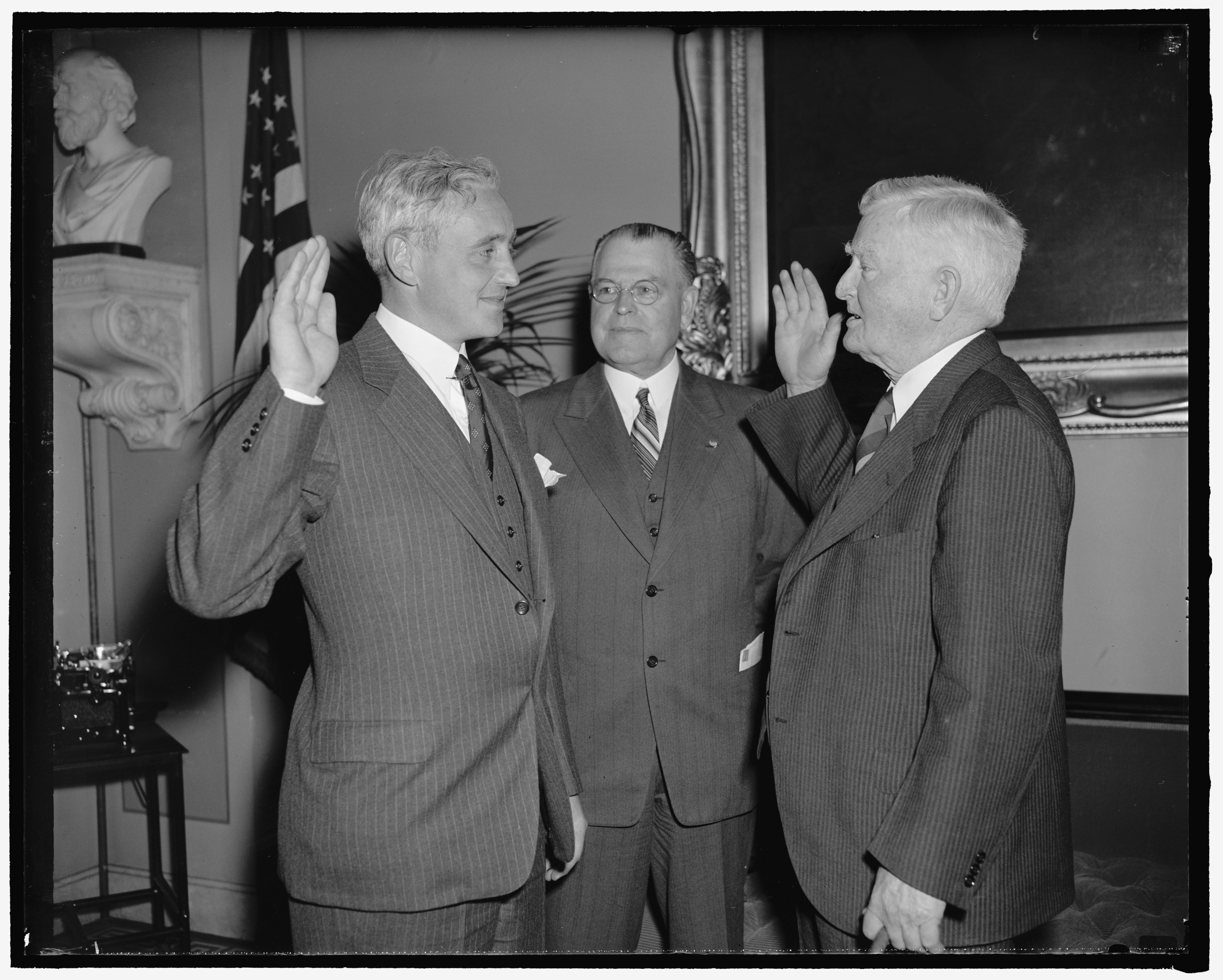
Library of Congress photo of Gibson's swearing in as a U.S. Senator. Senator Warren Austin looks on as Vice President John Nance Garner (right) administers the oath.

Gibson was appointed to the United States Senate by Governor George D. Aiken on June 24, 1940, filling the vacancy caused by the death of his father, Ernest Willard Gibson. The younger Gibson served from June 24, 1940, to January 3, 1941, but did not run in the election to fill the vacancy. He was succeeded in the Senate by Aiken, a family friend. Political observers assumed that Gibson accepted the temporary appointment to facilitate Aiken's election. Knowing that Aiken desired to become a Senator, Gibson accepted the appointment and agreed not to run in a primary against him, which another appointee might have done. Gibson was willing to fill the vacancy temporarily and then defer to Aiken because Gibson hoped to serve as governor.

== World War II ==
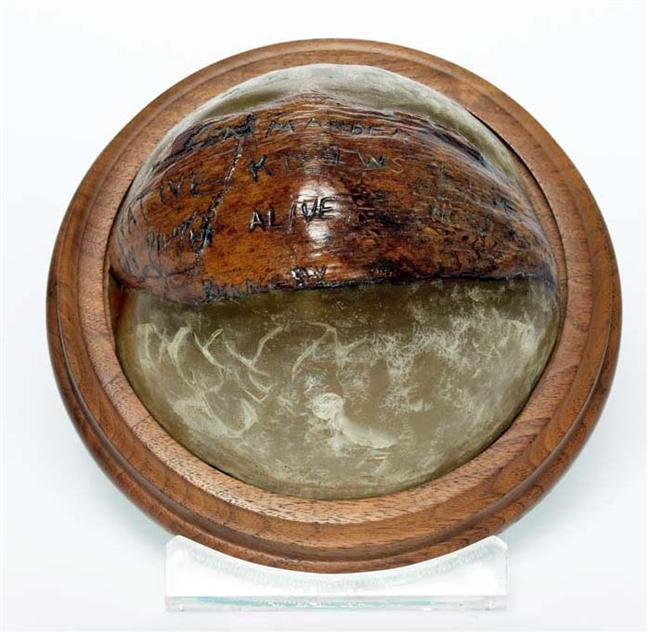
Shell on which John F. Kennedy scratched message requesting help following the sinking of his PT boat. Gibson returned it to Kennedy.

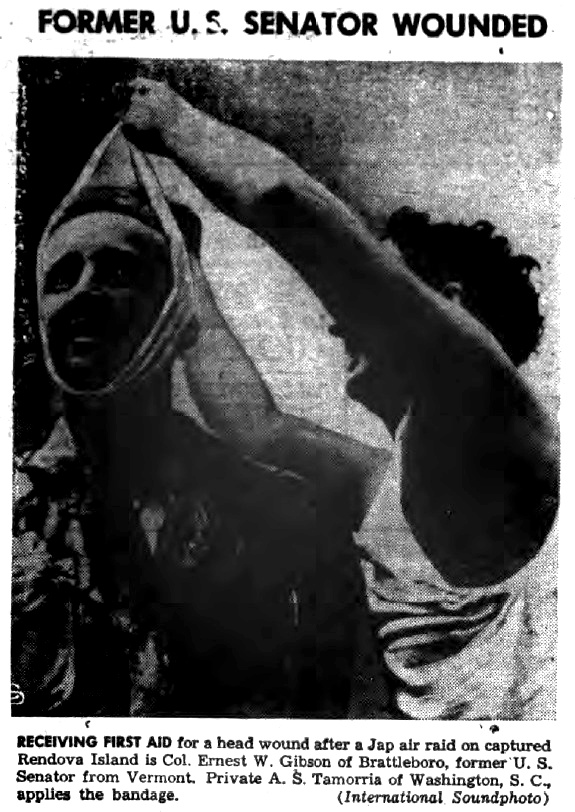
Gibson receiving first aid after being wounded.

From January to May 1941, Gibson was Executive Secretary and later Chairman of the Committee to Defend America by Aiding the Allies (the William Allen White Committee), which advocated for aid to the Allies before United States military involvement in World War II.

Gibson volunteered for active duty during World War II and served in the South Pacific as G-2 (Intelligence Officer) with the 43rd Infantry Division. He later served on the Intelligence staff at the United States Department of War. He was promoted to major in July 1942, and lieutenant colonel in November 1942.

While serving in the Pacific Theater, Gibson was wounded. A newspaper photo showing him having his head bandaged after he was wounded was circulated internationally, along with a caption identifying him as a former Senator, and he gained a measure of fame as a result.

When John F. Kennedy and his crew from PT-109 were rescued, the coconut shell Kennedy used to send a message asking for help came into Gibson's possession. Gibson later returned it to Kennedy. Kennedy had the shell preserved in a glass paperweight displayed on his Oval Office desk during his presidency. It is now displayed at the John F. Kennedy Library in Boston, Massachusetts.

Gibson was discharged in September 1945, shortly after receiving promotion to colonel. His awards included the Silver Star, (Note: Gibson's Silver Star citation: "A Silver Star is awarded to Ernest W. Gibson (O-175884), Lieutenant Colonel, Infantry, United States Army, for gallantry in action at New Georgia, Solomon Islands during the period of 2 July to 4 August 1943. Acting in his capacity as G-2 of an infantry division, Colonel Gibson was severely wounded in the head during an enemy bombing raid. Despite this wound he refused evacuation until ordered to Guadalcanal for treatment. Shortly thereafter he returned to the command of his own volition and for the duration of the campaign functioned superbly in his position of G-2. Visiting the front lines daily Colonel Gibson pushed division observation posts forward expeditiously, and by his exemplary courage and aggressiveness under fire was a constant source of inspiration to his section and to subordinate commanders." Gibson received his award on October 24, 1943. It was one of several decorations presented during a ceremony presided over by Major General Oscar Griswold, commander of the XIV Corps, of which the 43rd Infantry Division was a part.) Legion of Merit, (Note: Gibson's Legion of Merit citation: "For exceptionally meritorious conduct in the performance of outstanding services in the South Pacific area from 24 September 1942 to 14 December 1943. As G-2 of an infantry division, he trained the intelligence section from its inception and developed a remarkable intelligence awareness within the division. Foreseeing the need for a Japanese language section, he organized the first divisional unit of this type in the South Pacific theater. Colonel Gibson was outstanding in the manifestation of personal bravery and leadership, spending part of each day with front-line units during their combat operations. He was wounded during the early stages of the New Georgia campaign but insisted on returning to duty without delay. His service at all times was distinguished and a credit to his division.) and Purple Heart.

== Governor of Vermont ==
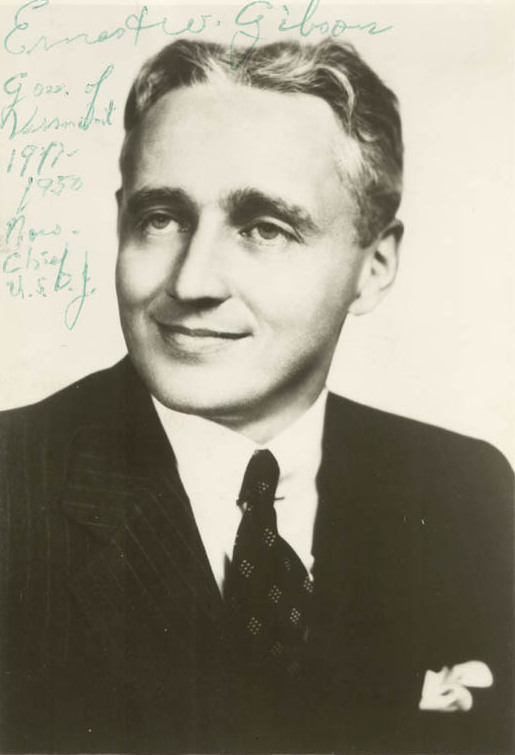
Gibson as governor.

In 1946, Vermont political observers expected Leonard F. Wing, the commander of the 43rd Division during the war, to run for governor. The unanswered question was whether incumbent governor Mortimer R. Proctor would run again or would defer to Wing for the Republican nomination, tantamount to election in Vermont.

Wing died in December 1945, soon after returning home from the war. Without Wing in the race, Gibson was free to announce his candidacy. Proctor decided to run for reelection, creating a rare Republican primary contest.

Gibson, an internationalist and a progressive, argued against the Republican status quo. Making the case against unwritten party policies including the Mountain Rule and the limitation of Governors to two years in office, Gibson appealed to war veterans and younger voters, calling for action over inertia, saying "Under this rule a relatively small clique of people choose governors nearly 10 years in advance, supporting them up a series of political steps to the highest office."

(According to the Mountain Rule, which had existed since the founding of the Republican Party in the 1850s, the governor and lieutenant governor candidates were identified years in advance, and alternated between the east and west sides of the Green Mountains. Governors were limited to two years in office. United States Senators were also allocated based on the Green Mountains—one from the east and one from the west. As a result of this party discipline, even after the advent of primary elections and the direct election of Senators, Republicans won every statewide election in Vermont for more than 100 years.)

Gibson defeated Proctor and won the general election in 1946, in what was called "a repudiation by Vermont voters of political practices and traditions that have been long established – a rebellion, not against outright mismanagement and inefficiency in the state government at Montpelier, but rather against the inertia and lack of aggressiveness of administration policies."

He won reelection in 1948 and served from January 1947 to January 1950. During Gibson's first term, he concentrated on increasing state services following years of small budgets and limited priorities following the Great Depression and World War II. He obtained approval of plans to expand and modernize state highways, improve health services, and enhance education and social welfare programs. To raise the funds necessary to support the largest budget in state history ($31 million), Gibson advocated for and obtained an increase in the state income tax.

Gibson resigned to become a federal judge and was succeeded by Harold J. Arthur.

== Federal judicial service ==
Frustrated at dealing with a Republican Vermont General Assembly and party structure that was more conservative than his, Gibson contemplated an early exit from the governorship rather than trying for a third term.

Gibson was nominated by President Harry S. Truman on September 15, 1949, to the seat on the United States District Court for the District of Vermont vacated by the death of Judge James Patrick Leamy. He was confirmed by the United States Senate on October 15, 1949, and received his commission on October 18, 1949. He served as Chief Judge from 1966 to 1969. His service terminated on November 4, 1969, due to his death.

=== Other service ===
In 1956, Gibson was appointed a Civilian Aide to the Secretary of the Army. The Civilian Aide program uses prominent individuals in each state and territory to promote goodwill between the civilian population and the Army by ensuring that the public is aware of ongoing Army projects and programs.

=== Notable law clerks ===
During Gibson's time on the bench, his law clerks included M. Jerome Diamond and James M. Jeffords, who clerked for Gibson from 1962 to 1963. According to Jeffords, a lesson imparted by Gibson played a role in Jeffords' decision to leave the Republican Party in 2001, which changed control of the United States Senate. As related by Jeffords, Gibson once paid closer attention to the facts than the letter of the law in order to arrive at a just outcome in a tort case involving skiing. When Jeffords questioned Gibson's approach, Gibson said, "Never let the law get in the way of justice; justice is what counts." Jeffords further stated that he often reflected on this quote when considering decisions, including his decision to leave the Republicans.

=== Irasburg Affair ===
In 1969, Gibson headed a committee to investigate the 1968 “Irasburg Affair,” in which an African American minister was targeted by a campaign to force him out of Vermont. This effort included police harassment as well as an anonymous individual firing gunshots into the minister's home. Gibson's commission found fault with local and state authorities, including members of the Vermont State Police.

== Death ==
Gibson died in Brattleboro on November 4, 1969. He was interred in Brattleboro's Morningside Cemetery.

== Honors ==
Gibson received several honorary degrees during his life, including a Legum Doctor (LL.D.) from the University of Vermont in 1947 and a Doctor of Juridical Science (DJS) from Suffolk University Law School in 1958. (Note: The references indicate that Gibson received an honorary degree in 1958. On January 17, 2019, a senior editor in Suffolk University's Public Affairs department confirmed in an email exchange that the degree was a DJS. See talk page for additional information.) He received a posthumous LL.D. from Saint Michael's College in November 1969.

== Family ==
Gibson married Dorothy P. Switzer (1902–1958) on October 9, 1926, and they had four children. In 1961, he married Ann H. Haag.

Gibson's son, Ernest W. Gibson III (1927–2020), served as an Associate Justice of the Vermont Supreme Court. His daughter, Grace "Gay" Gibson Newcomer (1930–2025), was a professor at Westchester Community College. His son Robert H. Gibson (1931–1999) served as Assistant Secretary of the Vermont Senate from 1963 to 1967, and Secretary from 1967 to 1999. His son David A. Gibson (1936–2010) served in the Vermont State Senate from 1977 to 1983, and was Senate Secretary from 2000 to 2010.

== Notes ==
Party political offices
Preceded by Mortimer R. Proctor	Republican nominee for Governor of Vermont; 1946, 1948	Succeeded by Lee E. Emerson
U.S. Senate
Preceded by Ernest Willard Gibson	U.S. senator (Class 3) from Vermont; 1940–1941; Served alongside: Warren Austin	Succeeded by George Aiken
Political offices
Preceded by Mortimer R. Proctor	Governor of Vermont; 1947–1950	Succeeded by Harold J. Arthur
Legal offices
Preceded by James Patrick Leamy	Judge of the United States District Court for the District of Vermont; 1950–1969	Succeeded by James L. Oakes
Preceded by Office established	Chief Judge of the United States District Court for the District of Vermont; 1966–1969	Succeeded by Bernard Joseph Leddy
