= List of members of the American Legion =

This table provides a list of notable members of the American Legion.

== A ==
| Member | Conflict Era | Branch of Service | References |
|---|---|---|---|
| Sherman Adams | World War I Era | U.S. Marine Corps | |
| Spiro Agnew | World War II Era | U.S. Army | |
| Harold Arthur | World War II Era | U.S. Army | |
| Gene Autry | World War II Era | U.S. Army Air Forces | |

== B ==
| Member | Conflict Era | Branch of Service | References |
|---|---|---|---|
| Perry Belmont | World War I Era | U.S. Army | |
| Humphrey Bogart | World War I Era | U.S. Navy | |
| Hale Boggs | World War II Era | U.S. Navy | |
| John Breckinridge | World War II Era | U.S. Army | |
| Maurice Britt | World War II Era | U.S. Army | |
| Harold Burton | World War I Era | U.S. Army | |
| George Bush | World War II Era | U.S. Navy | |
| George Bush | Vietnam War Era | U.S. Air Force | |
| Prescott Bush | World War I Era | U.S. Army | |
| Red Buttons | World War II Era | U.S. Army Air Forces | |
| Richard Byrd | World War I Era | U.S. Navy | |

== C ==
| Member | Conflict Era | Branch of Service | References |
|---|---|---|---|
| Jimmy Carter | World War II Era | U.S. Navy | |
| John Chafee | World War II Era | U.S. Marine Corps | |
| Francis Cherry | World War II Era | U.S. Navy | |
| Bennett Clark | World War I Era | U.S. Army | |
| Max Cleland | Vietnam War Era | U.S. Army | |
| Robert Coontz | World War I Era | U.S. Navy | |
| Tom Cotton | War on terrorism Era | U.S. Army | |

== D ==
| Member | Conflict Era | Branch of Service | References |
|---|---|---|---|
| Tom Daschle | Vietnam War Era | U.S. Air Force | |
| Charles Dawes | World War I Era | U.S. Army | |
| Cecil DeMille | World War I Era | U.S. Army | |
| Everett Dirksen | World War I Era | U.S. Army | |
| Bob Dole | World War II Era | U.S. Army | |
| William Donovan | World War I Era | U.S. Army | |

== E ==
| Member | Conflict Era | Branch of Service | References |
|---|---|---|---|
| Dwight Eisenhower | World War I Era | U.S. Army | |
| Sam Ervin | World War I Era | U.S. Army | |

== F ==
| Member | Conflict Era | Branch of Service | References |
|---|---|---|---|
| Orval Faubus | World War II Era | U.S. Army | |
| Mark Ferguson III | Gulf War Era | U.S. Navy | |
| Hamilton Fish, Jr. | World War I Era | U.S. Army | |
| Hamilton Fish IV | World War II Era | U.S. Navy | |
| Jim Folsom | World War II Era | U.S. Army | |
| Gerald Ford | World War II Era | U.S. Navy | |

== G ==
| Member | Conflict Era | Branch of Service | References |
|---|---|---|---|
| Clark Gable | World War II Era | U.S. Army Air Forces | |
| William Gardiner | World War I Era | U.S. Army | |
| John Gleason, Jr. | World War II Era | U.S. Army | |
| Albert Gore, Jr. | Vietnam War Era | U.S. Army | |
| John Greenway | World War I Era | U.S. Army | |
| Warren Grimm | World War I Era | U.S. Army | |

== H ==
| Member | Conflict Era | Branch of Service | References |
|---|---|---|---|
| Charlton Heston | World War II Era | U.S. Army Air Forces | |
| Luther Hodges | World War I Era | U.S. Army | |
| John Hoeppel | World War I Era | U.S. Army | |
| Ernest Hollings | World War II Era | U.S. Army | |
| Jon Huertas | Gulf War Era | U.S. Air Force | |

== I ==
| Member | Conflict Era | Branch of Service | References |
|---|---|---|---|
| Vincent Impellitteri | World War I Era | U.S. Navy | |

== J ==
| Member | Conflict Era | Branch of Service | References |
|---|---|---|---|
| Dr. Nelson Jackson | World War I Era | U.S. Army | |
| Douglas Jacobson | World War II Era | U.S. Marine Corps | |
| Joseph Johnson | World War I Era | U.S. Army | |
| Louis Johnson | World War I Era | U.S. Army | |
| Lyndon Johnson | World War II Era | U.S. Navy | |
| Royal Johnson | World War I Era | U.S. Army | |

== K ==
| Member | Conflict Era | Branch of Service | References |
|---|---|---|---|
| John Kennedy | World War II Era | U.S. Navy | |
| Frank Knox | World War I Era | U.S. Army | |

== L ==
| Member | Conflict Era | Branch of Service | References |
|---|---|---|---|
| Luke Lea | World War I Era | U.S. Army | |
| Stan Lee | World War II Era | U.S. Army Air Forces | |
| Henry Lindsley | World War I Era | U.S. Army | |
| John Lodge | World War II Era | U.S. Navy | |

== M ==
| Member | Conflict Era | Branch of Service | References |
|---|---|---|---|
| Charles Mabey | World War I Era | U.S. Navy | |
| Douglas MacArthur | World War I Era | U.S. Army | |
| Edward Martin | World War I Era | U.S. Army | |
| John McCloy | World War I Era | U.S. Navy | |
| Stewart McKinney | Korean War Era | U.S. Air Force | |
| James McKnight | World War I Era | U.S. Army | |
| Sid McMath | World War II Era | U.S. Marine Corps | |
| Adolphe Menjou | World War I Era | U.S. Army | |
| Ron Meyer | Vietnam War Era | U.S. Marine Corps | |
| Thomas Miller | World War I Era | U.S. Army | |
| Billy Mitchell | World War I Era | U.S. Army | |
| Walter Mondale | Korean War Era | U.S. Army | |

== N ==
| Member | Conflict Era | Branch of Service | References |
|---|---|---|---|
| Richard Nixon | World War II Era | U.S. Navy | |

== O ==
| Member | Conflict Era | Branch of Service | References |
|---|---|---|---|
| William St. Onge | World War II Era | U.S. Army Air Forces | |

== P ==
| Member | Conflict Era | Branch of Service | References |
|---|---|---|---|
| George Patton, Jr. | World War I Era | U.S. Army | |
| Claude Pepper | World War I Era | U.S. Army | |
| John Pershing | World War I Era | U.S. Army | |
| Mike Pompeo | Gulf War Era | U.S. Army | |
| Mortimer Proctor | World War I Era | U.S. Army | |

== R ==
| Member | Conflict Era | Branch of Service | References |
|---|---|---|---|
| Ronald Reagan | World War II Era | U.S. Army Air Forces | |
| Scott Richardson | Gulf War Era | U.S. Army | |
| Stanley Reed | World War I Era | U.S. Army | |
| Eddie Rickenbacker | World War I Era | U.S. Army | |
| Rob Riggle | War on terrorism Era | U.S. Marine Corps | |
| Pierre Robineau | World War I Era | U.S. Army | |
| Gene Roddenberry | World War II Era | U.S. Army Air Forces | |
| Phil Roe | Vietnam War Era | U.S. Army | |
| Mickey Rooney | World War II Era | U.S. Army | |
| Richard Russell, Jr. | World War I Era | U.S. Navy | |

== S ==
| Member | Conflict Era | Branch of Service | References |
|---|---|---|---|
| Fernand St Germain | Korean War Era | U.S. Army | |
| Leverett Saltonstall | World War I Era | U.S. Army | |
| Chuck Sams | Gulf War Era | U.S. Navy | |
| John Schmitz | Korean War Era | U.S. Marine Corps | |
| Robert Stafford | World War II Era | U.S. Navy | |
| Lloyd Stark | World War I Era | U.S. Army | |
| John Stelle | World War I Era | U.S. Army | |
| Jimmy Stewart | World War II Era | U.S. Army Air Forces | |

== T ==
| Member | Conflict Era | Branch of Service | References |
|---|---|---|---|
| Herman Talmadge | World War II Era | U.S. Navy | |
| John Thomas Taylor | World War I Era; World War II Era | U.S. Army | |
| John Tower | World War II Era | U.S. Navy | |
| Harry Truman | World War I Era | U.S. Army | |
| Roscoe Turner | World War I Era | U.S. Army | |

== U ==
| Member | Conflict Era | Branch of Service | References |
|---|---|---|---|
| Morris Udall | World War II Era | U.S. Army Air Forces | |

== V ==
| Member | Conflict Era | Branch of Service | References |
|---|---|---|---|
| Dick Van Dyke | World War II Era | U.S. Army Air Forces | |
| Blake Van Leer | World War I Era | U.S. Army | |
| Harry Vaughan | World War I Era | U.S. Army | |

== W ==
| Member | Conflict Era | Branch of Service | References |
|---|---|---|---|
| John Warner | World War II Era | U.S. Navy | |
| George White | World War I Era | U.S. Army | |
| Richard Wigglesworth | World War I Era | U.S. Army | |
| Larry Wilcox | Vietnam War Era | U.S. Marine Corps | |
| Hosea Williams | World War II Era | U.S. Army | |
| Woodrow Wilson | World War I Era | Commander in Chief of the Army and Navy of the United States | |
| Woody Williams | World War II Era | U.S. Marine Corps | |
| Leonard Wood | World War I Era | U.S. Army | |
| Samuel Woodfill | World War I Era | U.S. Army | |
| Harry Woodring | World War I Era | U.S. Army | |

== Y ==
| Member | Conflict Era | Branch of Service | References |
|---|---|---|---|
| Alvin York | World War I Era | U.S. Army | |

== Z ==
| Member | Conflict Era | Branch of Service | References |
|---|---|---|---|
| Orville Zimmerman | World War I Era | U.S. Army | |
