= Wallace M. Fay =

American business executive and politician

Wallace M. Fay (January 30, 1896 – April 25, 1976) was a Vermont business executive and politician who served as Speaker of the Vermont House of Representatives.

== Biography ==
Wallace MacFie Fay was born in Fort Covington, New York on January 30, 1896.

Fay was educated in the schools of Covington. Beginning in 1914, Fay was employed at the Vermont Marble Company, rising to vice president and member of the board of directors before retiring in 1966.

In 1917 Fay enlisted in the United States Army for World War I. After entering service at Fort Ethan Allen, he completed officer's training and received a commission as a second lieutenant of Aviation. He served in Texas, Florida and Virginia before being discharged in December, 1918. He maintained his military membership in the 1920s as a member of the Vermont National Guard's 86th Infantry Brigade.

Fay served as the governor's executive clerk during the administration of Redfield Proctor Jr. from 1923 to 1925.

A Republican, Fay served in local offices, including president of the Village of Proctor.

In 1938 Fay won a seat in the Vermont House of Representatives and served two terms, 1939 to 1943. His House tenure included service as chairman of the Appropriations committee. He was elected to the Vermont Senate in 1942 and served one term, 1943 to 1945.

In 1944 Fay was again elected to the Vermont House of Representatives. He served four terms, 1945 to 1953. He was Speaker of the House in his final term, 1951 to 1953.

In 1952 Fay received an honorary Doctor of Laws degree from the University of Vermont.

Fay died in Proctor on April 25, 1976, and was buried in Proctor's South Street Cemetery.

Political offices
Preceded by J. Harold Stacey	Speaker of the Vermont House of Representatives; 1951–1953	Succeeded by Consuelo N. Bailey
