= Karl Meyer (activist) =

American Catholic Worker activist (born 1937)

Karl H. Meyer (born 1937 in West Rupert, Vermont) is an American pacifist, activist, Catholic Worker, and tax resister. He is the son of William H. Meyer, a former member of the United States House of Representatives from Vermont. He is the founder of the Nashville Greenlands Catholic Worker community in Nashville, Tennessee.

== Life ==
Karl Meyer grew up in West Rupert, Vermont. His father first worked there as a soil-conservation agent, later he became a member of the Congress. In 1953, Karl went to the University of Chicago with a scholarship at the age of only 16. Rather soon, he dropped his study and went to New York City where he worked as a stock clerk at a bookstore. Due to recommendations of his former resident head, Meyer read books of several catholic authors just like Ammon Hennacy and Dorothy Day, who were engaged in the Catholic Worker Movement. According to his own words, Meyer found in the Catholic Worker "the most authentic American movement for change." Like Day, Meyer was a convert to Catholicism but has since been a non-believer for decades.

In 1961, Meyer participated in the Peace March to Moscow, together with a group of activists across the US and then across Europe into the Soviet Union. In 1965, Meyer opposed the death penalty by walking from Chicago to Springfield, Illinois, dragging a mock electric chair on a cart.

In 1984, he defied the IRS's "frivolous filing" penalty by filing what the agency considered to be a "frivolous" return every day that year. He was assessed $140,000 in penalties, but the IRS was able to recover only a little more than $1,000. He coined the name "cabbage patch resistance" for this technique, naming it after the then-popular Cabbage Patch Kids dolls, that, like his daily returns, were each a little different.

In the 1990s, Karl Meyer used the "Peace House", a mobile home and educational center, in which he drove around the United States. In 1997 he founded "Nashville Greenlands", a catholic worker-affiliated community in Nashville, where he still lives.

Meyer has been arrested more than 50 times while protesting, among other things, against the Cold War, the Vietnam War, conditions in East Germany, the wars in El Salvador and Nicaragua, the death penalty and UN sanctions against Iraq. According to Richard Mertens of The University of Chicago Magazine, Meyer has committed his work to embrace peace by "living much of his life in voluntary poverty while trying to serve the poor and the unemployed."

== See also ==
- List of peace activists
