= 1958 United States Senate election in Vermont =

- November 4, 1958
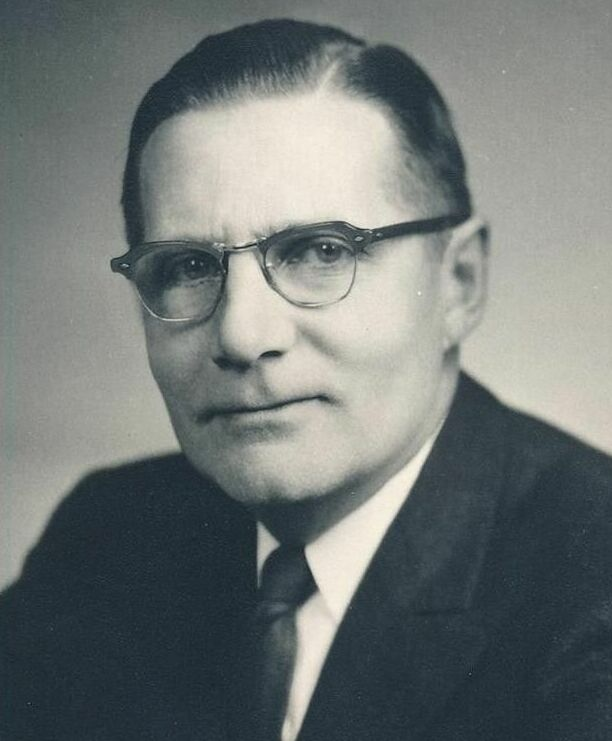

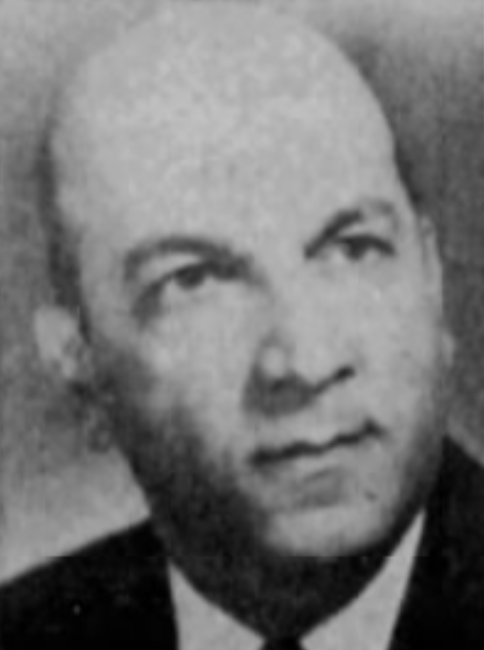
Nominee	Winston L. Prouty	Frederick Fayette
Party	Republican	Democratic
Popular vote	64,900	59,536
Percentage	52.15%	47.84%
- County results Prouty: 50–60% 60–70% Fayette: 50–60% 60–70%
U.S. senator before election
Ralph Flanders
Republican
Elected U.S. Senator
Winston L. Prouty
Republican

The 1958 United States Senate election in Vermont took place on November 4, 1958. Incumbent Republican Ralph Flanders did not run for re-election to another term in the United States Senate. Republican candidate Winston L. Prouty defeated Democratic candidate Frederick J. Fayette to succeed him.

== Republican primary ==
=== Candidates ===
- Lee E. Emerson, former Governor of Vermont
- Winston L. Prouty, U.S. Representative for Vermont's at-large congressional district

=== Results ===
Republican primary results
Party	Candidate	Votes	%	±%
Republican	Winston L. Prouty	31,866	64.6	
Republican	Lee E. Emerson	17,468	35.4	
Republican	Other	4	0.0	
Total votes		49,338	100.0	

== Democratic primary ==
=== Candidates ===
- Frederick J. Fayette, State Senator

=== Results ===
Democratic primary results
Party	Candidate	Votes	%	±%
Democratic	Frederick J. Fayette	6,546	99.5	
Democratic	Other	32	0.5	
Total votes		6,578	100.0	

== General election ==
=== Results ===
United States Senate election in Vermont, 1958
Party	Candidate	Votes	%	±%
Republican	Winston L. Prouty	64,900	52.15%	−20.17%
Democratic	Frederick J. Fayette	59,536	47.84%	+20.17%
N/A	Other	6	0.00%	N/A
Total votes		124,442	100.00%	

== See also ==
- 1958 United States Senate elections
