= 1954 Vermont gubernatorial election =

- November 2, 1954
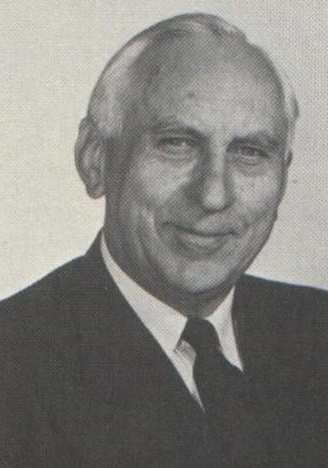

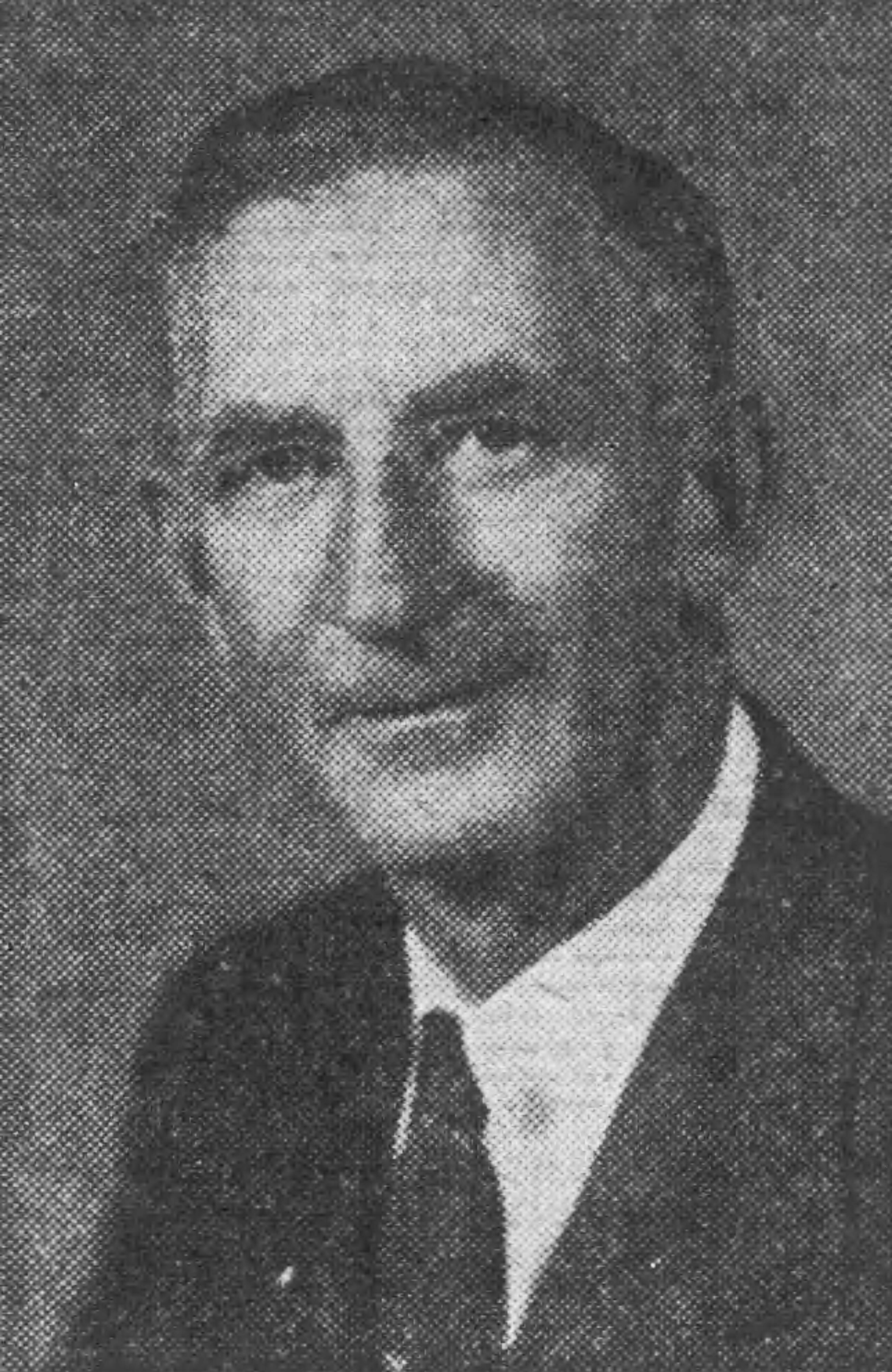
Nominee	Joseph B. Johnson	E. Frank Branon
Party	Republican	Democratic
Popular vote	59,778	54,554
Percentage	52.27%	47.70%
- Johnson: 50–60% 60–70% 70–80% 80–90% 90-100% Branon: 50–60% 60–70% 70–80% 90–100% Tie: 50% No Vote/Data
Governor before election
Lee E. Emerson
Republican
Elected Governor
Joseph B. Johnson
Republican

The 1954 Vermont gubernatorial election took place on November 2, 1954. Incumbent Republican Lee E. Emerson did not run for re-election to a third term as Governor of Vermont. Republican candidate Joseph B. Johnson defeated Democratic candidate E. Frank Branon to succeed him.

== Republican primary ==
=== Results ===
Republican primary results
Party	Candidate	Votes	%	±%
Republican	Joseph B. Johnson	41,165	67.5	
Republican	Henry D. Vail	19,768	32.4	
Republican	Other	36	0.1	
Total votes		60,969	100.0	

== Democratic primary ==
=== Results ===
Democratic primary results
Party	Candidate	Votes	%	±%
Democratic	E. Frank Branon	4,467	99.2	
Democratic	Other	35	0.8	
Total votes		4,502	100.0	

== General election ==
=== Results ===
1954 Vermont gubernatorial election
Party	Candidate	Votes	%	±%
Republican	Joseph B. Johnson	59,778	52.27	
Democratic	E. Frank Branon	54,554	47.70	
N/A	Other	28	0.03	
Total votes		114,360	100.0	
