= 1964 United States Senate election in Vermont =

- November 3, 1964
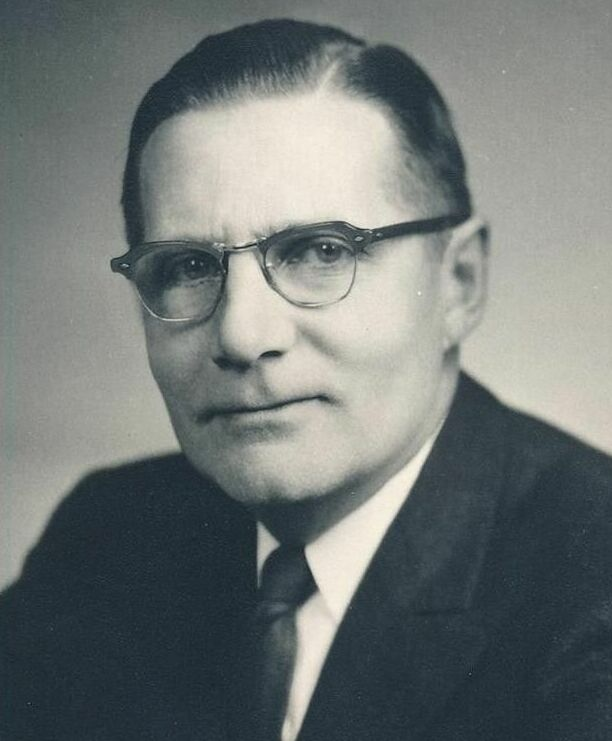

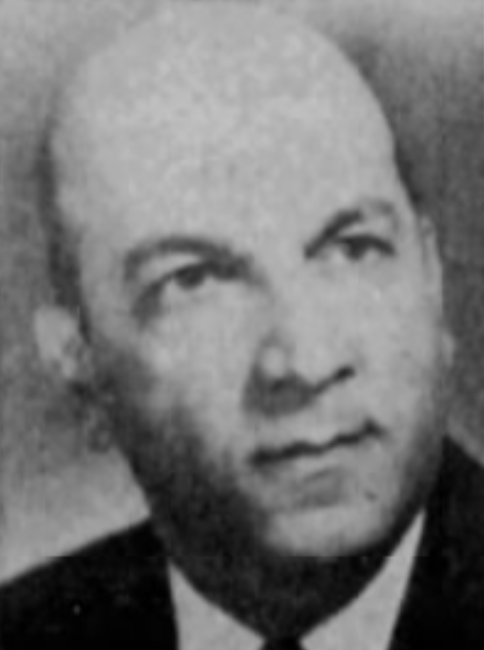
Nominee	Winston L. Prouty	Frederick Fayette
Party	Republican	Democratic
Popular vote	87,879	76,457
Percentage	53.47%	46.52%
- County results Prouty: 50–60% 60–70% Fayette: 50–60%
U.S. senator before election
Winston L. Prouty
Republican
Elected U.S. Senator
Winston L. Prouty
Republican

The 1964 United States Senate election in Vermont took place on November 3, 1964. Incumbent Republican Winston L. Prouty successfully ran for re-election to another term in the United States Senate, defeating Democratic candidate Frederick J. Fayette.

== Republican primary ==
=== Results ===
Republican primary results
Party	Candidate	Votes	%	±%
Republican	Winston L. Prouty (inc.)	43,648	99.9	
Republican	Other	63	0.1	
Total votes		43,711	100.0	

== Democratic primary ==
=== Results ===
Democratic primary results
Party	Candidate	Votes	%	±%
Democratic	Frederick J. Fayette	12,388	71.1	
Democratic	William H. Meyer	4,913	28.2	
Democratic	Other	134	0.7	
Total votes		17,435	100.0	

== General election ==
=== Results ===
United States Senate election in Vermont, 1964
Party	Candidate	Votes	%	±%
Republican	Winston L. Prouty	83,302	50.69%	−1.46%
Independent	Winston L. Prouty	4,516	2.75%	N/A
N/A	Winston L. Prouty	61	0.04%	N/A
Total	Winston L. Prouty (inc.)	87,879	53.47%	N/A
Democratic	Frederick J. Fayette	76,457	46.52%	−1.32%
N/A	Other	14	0.01%	N/A
Total votes		164,350	100.00%	

== See also ==
- United States Senate elections, 1964
