= Joseph B. Johnson =

American politician

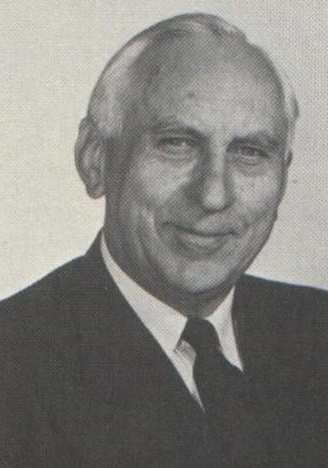

70th Governor of Vermont
- In office January 6, 1955 – January 8, 1959
- Lieutenant: Consuelo N. Bailey; Robert T. Stafford
- Preceded by: Lee E. Emerson
- Succeeded by: Robert T. Stafford

65th Lieutenant Governor of Vermont
- In office January 4, 1951 – January 6, 1955
- Governor: Lee E. Emerson
- Preceded by: Harold J. Arthur
- Succeeded by: Consuelo N. Bailey

Member of the Vermont Senate from Windsor County
- In office 1947–1951 Serving with Guy H. Cleveland, Allen M. Fletcher Jr.
- Preceded by: Guy H. Cleveland, Allen M. Fletcher Jr., Richard Parker
- Succeeded by: Frank Corliss, Susan Drown, Henry D. Vail

Member of the Vermont House of Representatives from Springfield
- In office 1945–1947
- Preceded by: Collins Stearns
- Succeeded by: Charles N. Stafford

Personal details
- Born: August 29, 1893 Helsingborg, Sweden
- Died: October 25, 1986 (aged 93) Springfield, Vermont, U.S.
- Party: Republican
- Spouse: Virginia Frances Slack (m. 1919; died 1983)
- Children: 1
- Education: University of Vermont

Joseph Blaine Johnson (August 29, 1893 – October 25, 1986) was an American politician who served as the 70th governor of Vermont from 1955 to 1959.

== Biography ==
Born in Helsingborg, Sweden, Johnson moved with his family from Sweden to Springfield, Vermont, in 1902 and became a naturalized U.S. citizen. He graduated from the University of Vermont in 1915 and became a mechanical engineer. Johnson was a Congregationalist. He married Virginia F. Slack on September 23, 1919.

== Career ==
Johnson worked at the Bryant Chucking Grinder Company, starting as a draftsman and retiring as General Manager in 1949. He also served as vice president of the Springfield Cooperative Savings and Loan Association, director of the First National Bank of Springfield, and director of the Lovejoy Tool Company of Springfield.

Johnson was elected to the Vermont House of Representatives in 1945 and served from 1945 to 1946. He was elected to the Vermont Senate from Windsor County in 1947 and served until 1951. He then served two terms from 1951 to 1955 as the 65th lieutenant governor of Vermont.

Receiving the Republican nomination for governor, Johnson won the election and served from January 6, 1955 to January 6, 1959. During his administration, he sponsored legislation supporting increased financial support for the University of Vermont. He also facilitated Vermont's inclusion in the federal interstate highway system. He was a Vermont delegate to the 1956 Republican National Convention. After serving two terms as governor, he retired from public life but remained director of the Lovejoy Tool Company.

== Death ==
Johnson died on October 25, 1986, and is interred at Summerhill Cemetery, Springfield, Windsor County, Vermont.

== See also ==
- List of members of the American Legion
- List of United States governors born outside the United States

Party political offices
Preceded by Harold J. Arthur	Republican nominee for Lieutenant Governor of Vermont; 1950, 1952	Succeeded by Consuelo N. Bailey
Preceded by Lee E. Emerson	Republican nominee for Governor of Vermont; 1954, 1956	Succeeded by Robert Stafford
Political offices
Preceded by Harold J. Arthur	Lieutenant Governor of Vermont; 1951–1955	Succeeded by Consuelo N. Bailey
Preceded by Lee E. Emerson	Governor of Vermont; 1955–1959	Succeeded by Robert T. Stafford
