= Winston L. Prouty =

American banker and politician (1906–1971)

Winston Prouty
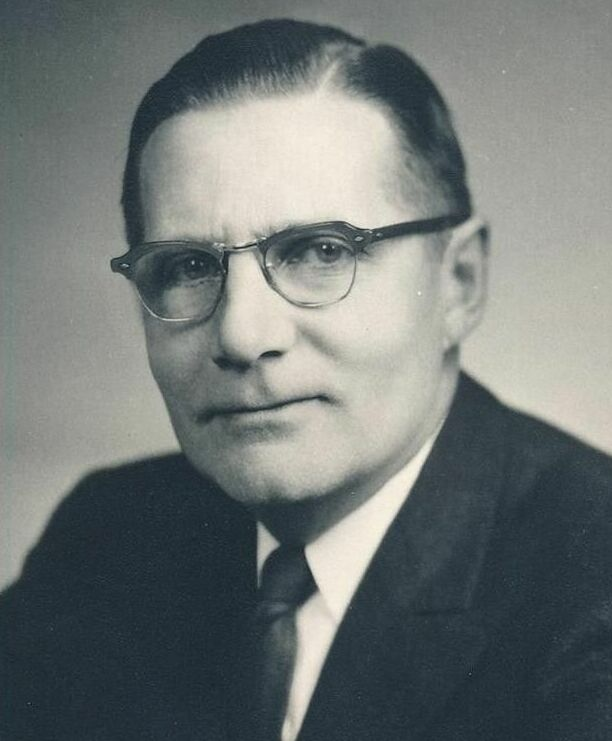

United States Senator from Vermont
- In office January 3, 1959 – September 10, 1971
- Preceded by: Ralph Flanders
- Succeeded by: Robert Stafford

Member of the United States House of Representatives from Vermont's at-large district
- In office January 3, 1951 – January 3, 1959
- Preceded by: Charles Albert Plumley
- Succeeded by: William H. Meyer

Speaker of the Vermont House of Representatives
- In office 1947–1949
- Preceded by: Joseph H. Denny
- Succeeded by: J. Harold Stacey

Member of the Vermont House of Representatives from Newport
- In office 1941–1949
- Preceded by: John M. Bradley
- Succeeded by: Robert W. H. Davis

Mayor of Newport, Vermont
- In office 1938–1941
- Preceded by: John M. Bradley
- Succeeded by: Ona S. Searles

Personal details
- Born: Winston Lewis Prouty; September 1, 1906 Newport, Vermont, U.S.
- Died: September 10, 1971 (aged 65) Boston, Massachusetts, U.S.
- Party: Republican
- Spouse(s): Frances C. Hearle Backus (1939-1960, her death); Jennette Herbert Hall (1962-1971, his death)
- Children: 3
- Education: Lafayette College (attended)
- Profession: Businessman

Winston Lewis Prouty (September 1, 1906 – September 10, 1971) was an American banker and Republican politician who represented Vermont in the United States House of Representatives from 1951 to 1959 and the United States Senate from 1959 until his death in 1971. He also served as mayor of the city of Newport and a member of the Vermont House of Representatives. He was elected Speaker of the Vermont House of Representatives from 1947 to 1949.

== Early life and education ==
Winston Prouty was born in Newport, Vermont, to Willard Robert and Margaret (née Lockhart) Prouty. His family owned Prouty & Miller Lumber Company, a lumber and building material business. His family was also involved in politics; his father and grandfather both served as state legislators. His uncle Charles A. Prouty was a member of the Interstate Commerce Commission, and another uncle, George H. Prouty served as Governor of Vermont from 1908 to 1910.

Prouty received his early education at public schools in Newport, and attended St. Paul's School in Garden City, New York and Bordentown Military Institute in New Jersey. He then studied engineering at Lafayette College in Easton, Pennsylvania, from 1925 to 1927. During his college years, he became a member of the Delta Upsilon fraternity.

== Early career ==
Prouty returned to Newport and joined his family's business, Prouty & Miller. He also served as a director of the National Bank of Newport and Associated Industries of Vermont. Though described as shy and reticent, in part because he was self-conscious about the loss of his right thumb in an accident at his family's business, Prouty decided on a career in politics. A Republican, he was a member of the Newport City Council from 1933 to 1937. He served as mayor of Newport from 1938 to 1941. He was elected to the Vermont House of Representatives in 1940, and served from 1941 to 1949. During his last two years in the legislature, he served as Speaker of the House. He was an unsuccessful candidate for the Republican nomination for Lieutenant Governor of Vermont in 1948, losing to Harold J. Arthur. From 1949 to 1950, he served as chairman of the state Water Conservation Board.

== Congressional career ==
=== House of Representatives ===
After longtime incumbent Charles Albert Plumley decided not to run in 1950, Prouty announced his candidacy for the United States House of Representatives from Vermont's At-large congressional district. He won the Republican nomination in a four-way race that included Governor Arthur. In the general election, he defeated his Democratic opponent, Herbert B. Comings, by a margin of 73%-26%. He was subsequently re-elected to three more terms, never receiving less than 61% of the vote. During his tenure in the House, Prouty served as a member of the Veterans Affairs Committee and House Foreign Affairs Committee. He was an advocate for the creation of the Saint Lawrence Seaway. During his tenure in the House, Prouty voted in favor of the Civil Rights Act of 1957.

=== Senate ===
He was elected to the United States Senate in 1958; he was reelected in 1964 and 1970 and served from January 3, 1959, until his death. In the Senate, Prouty's committee assignments included District of Columbia, Rules, Labor and Public Welfare, and Commerce, in addition to the Special Committee on Aging and the Select Committee on Small Business. Issues with which he was identified included federal aid for school construction, federal funding of courses for students with special needs, arts and music education, and senior citizen needs to include health care and expansion of Social Security eligibility. In addition, he was a longtime advocate for returning passenger rail service to Vermont. As the ranking Republican on the District of Columbia Committee, Prouty sponsored the legislation that created the district's Delegate to Congress. During his tenure in the Senate, Prouty voted in favor of the Civil Rights Acts of 1960, 1964, and 1968, as well as the 24th Amendment to the U.S. Constitution, the Voting Rights Act of 1965, and the confirmation of Thurgood Marshall to the U.S. Supreme Court.

== Death and burial ==
Prouty died from the effects of gastric cancer at New England Deaconess Hospital in Boston on September 10, 1971. He was buried at Pine Grove Cemetery in Newport.

== Family ==
In 1939, Prouty married Frances Currie Hearle Backus (1907–1960) of Stanstead, Quebec, who was the mother of three daughters from a previous marriage, Currie, Elizabeth, and Ann. She died in 1960, and in 1962, Prouty married Jennette Herbert Hall (1913–2002), who had been the chief aide to Congressmen Henry J. Latham of New York and Robert E. Cook of Ohio.

== Honors ==
In 1966, Prouty received the honorary degree of LL.D. from Lafayette College.

== See also ==
- List of members of the United States Congress who died in office (1950–1999)

Party political offices
Preceded by Ralph Flanders	Republican nominee for U.S. Senator from Vermont (Class 1); 1958, 1964, 1970	Succeeded by Robert Stafford
U.S. House of Representatives
Preceded by Charles A. Plumley	Member of the U.S. House of Representatives from Vermont's at-large congressional district 1951–1959	Succeeded by William H. Meyer
U.S. Senate
Preceded by Ralph E. Flanders	U.S. senator (Class 1) from Vermont; 1959–1971; Served alongside: George Aiken	Succeeded by Robert Stafford
Preceded by Carl Curtis	Ranking Member of the Senate Rules Committee; 1971	Succeeded by Ted Stevens
