= 1956 Vermont gubernatorial election =

- November 6, 1956
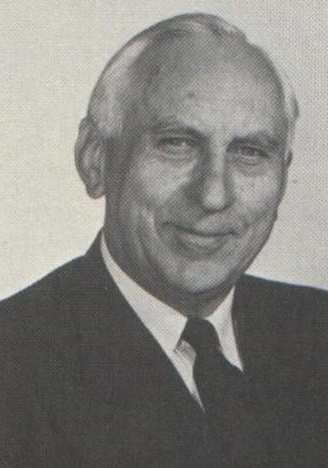

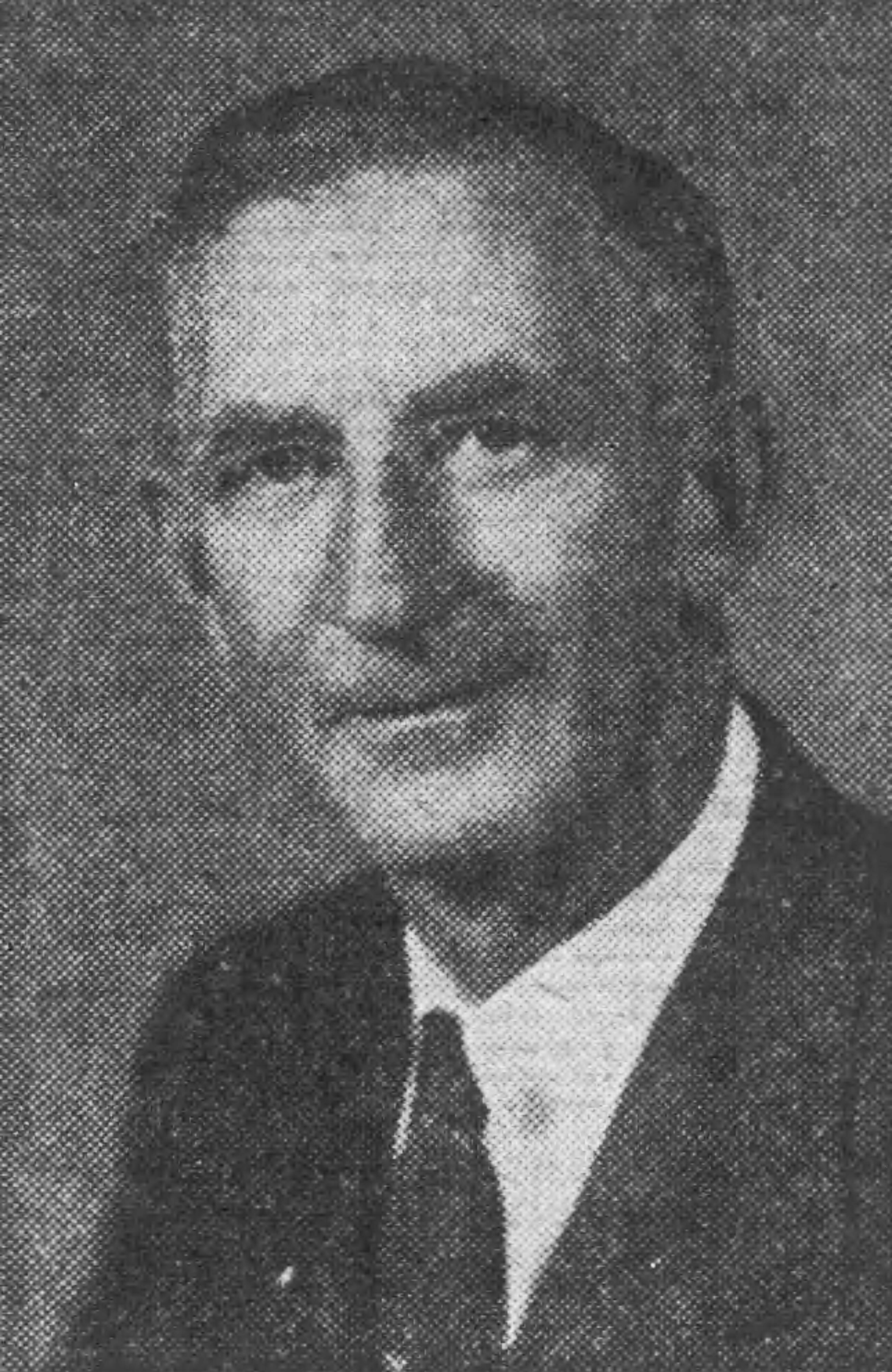
Nominee	Joseph B. Johnson	E. Frank Branon
Party	Republican	Democratic
Popular vote	88,379	65,420
Percentage	57.46%	42.53%
- Johnson: 50–60% 60–70% 70–80% 80–90% 90-100% Branon: 50–60% 60–70% 70–80% 80–90% No Vote/Data
Governor before election
Joseph B. Johnson
Republican
Elected Governor
Joseph B. Johnson
Republican

The 1956 Vermont gubernatorial election took place on November 6, 1956. Incumbent Republican Joseph B. Johnson ran successfully for re-election to a second term as Governor of Vermont, defeating Democratic candidate E. Frank Branon.

== Republican primary ==
=== Results ===
Republican primary results
Party	Candidate	Votes	%	±%
Republican	Joseph B. Johnson (inc.)	45,764	99.8	
Republican	Other	76	0.2	
Total votes		45,840	100.0	

== Democratic primary ==
=== Results ===
Democratic primary results
Party	Candidate	Votes	%	±%
Democratic	E. Frank Branon	8,322	99.9	
Democratic	Other	10	0.1	
Total votes		8,332	100.0	

== General election ==
=== Results ===
1956 Vermont gubernatorial election
Party	Candidate	Votes	%	±%
Republican	Joseph B. Johnson (inc.)	88,379	57.46	
Democratic	E. Frank Branon	65,420	42.53	
N/A	Other	10	0.01	
Total votes		153,809	100.0	
