= 1958 Vermont gubernatorial election =

- November 4, 1958
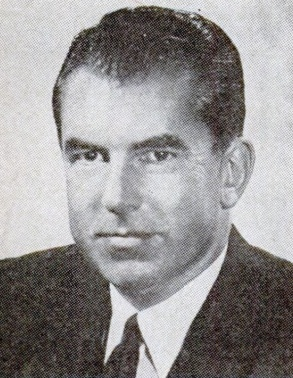

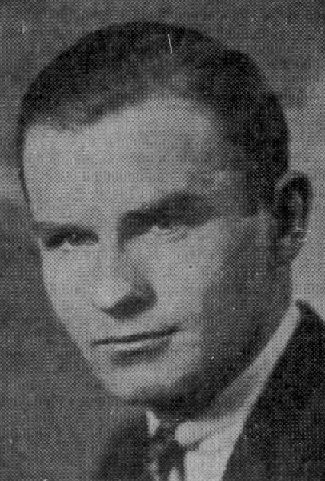
Nominee	Robert Stafford	Bernard Leddy
Party	Republican	Democratic
Popular vote	62,222	61,503
Percentage	50.29%	49.71%
- Stafford: 50–60% 60–70% 70–80% 80–90% 90-100% Leddy: 50–60% 60–70% 70–80% 80–90% 90–100% Tie: 50% No Vote/Data
Governor before election
Joseph B. Johnson
Republican
Elected Governor
Robert Stafford
Republican

The 1958 Vermont gubernatorial election took place on November 4, 1958. Incumbent Republican Joseph B. Johnson did not run for re-election to a third term as Governor of Vermont. Republican candidate Robert Stafford defeated Democratic candidate Bernard J. Leddy to succeed him.

== Republican primary ==
=== Results ===
Republican primary results
Party	Candidate	Votes	%	±%
Republican	Robert Stafford	43,547	99.9	
Republican	Other	36	0.1	
Total votes		43,583	100.0	

== Democratic primary ==
=== Results ===
Democratic primary results
Party	Candidate	Votes	%	±%
Democratic	Bernard J. Leddy	6,347	99.8	
Democratic	Other	10	0.2	
Total votes		6,357	100.0	

== General election ==
=== Results ===
1958 Vermont gubernatorial election
Party	Candidate	Votes	%	±%
Republican	Robert Stafford	62,222	50.29	
Democratic	Bernard J. Leddy	61,503	49.71	
N/A	Other	3	0.00	
Total votes		123,728	100.0	
