= Robert Stafford =

American politician (1913–2006)

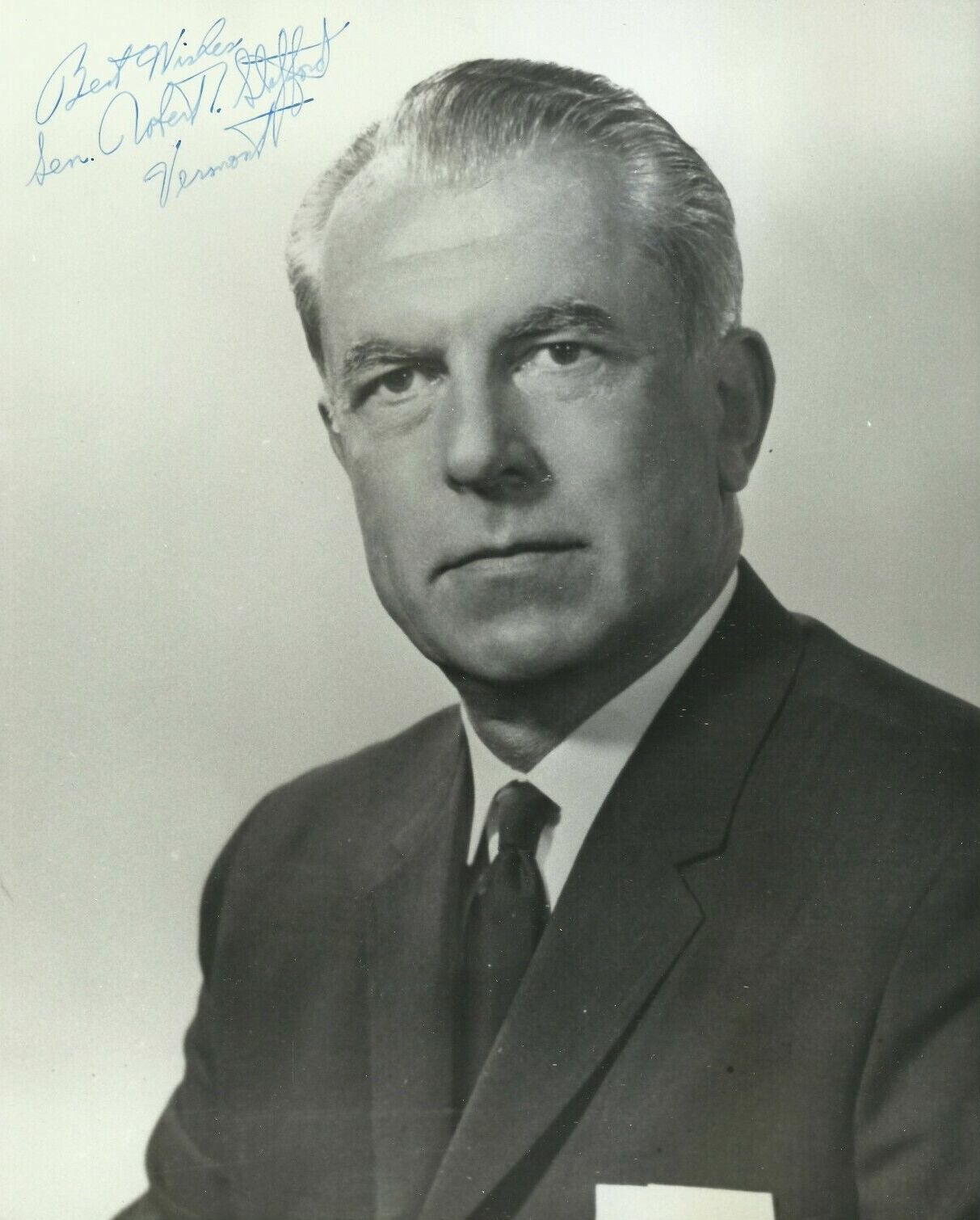

United States Senator from Vermont
- In office September 16, 1971 – January 3, 1989
- Preceded by: Winston L. Prouty
- Succeeded by: Jim Jeffords

Member of the U.S. House of Representatives from Vermont's at-large district
- In office January 3, 1961 – September 16, 1971
- Preceded by: William H. Meyer
- Succeeded by: Richard W. Mallary

71st Governor of Vermont
- In office January 8, 1959 – January 5, 1961
- Lieutenant: Robert S. Babcock
- Preceded by: Joseph B. Johnson
- Succeeded by: F. Ray Keyser Jr.

67th Lieutenant Governor of Vermont
- In office January 10, 1957 – January 8, 1959
- Governor: Joseph B. Johnson
- Preceded by: Consuelo N. Bailey
- Succeeded by: Robert S. Babcock

13th Attorney General of Vermont
- In office January 6, 1955 – January 10, 1957
- Governor: Joseph B. Johnson
- Preceded by: F. Elliott Barber Jr.
- Succeeded by: Frederick M. Reed

Personal details
- Born: Robert Theodore Stafford; August 8, 1913 Rutland, Vermont, U.S.
- Died: December 23, 2006 (aged 93) Rutland, Vermont, U.S.
- Party: Republican
- Spouse: Helen Kelley (m. 1938)
- Children: 4
- Education: Middlebury College (BA); University of Michigan; Boston University (LLB)
- Occupation: Politician; lawyer

Military service
- Allegiance: United States
- Branch/service: United States Navy; United States Navy Reserve
- Years of service: 1942–1971
- Rank: Captain
- Battles/wars: World War II; Korean War

Robert Theodore Stafford (August 8, 1913 – December 23, 2006) was an American politician from Vermont. In his lengthy political career, he served as the 71st governor of Vermont, a United States representative, and a U.S. senator. A Republican, Stafford was generally considered a liberal, or "Rockefeller Republican".

Stafford is best remembered for his staunch environmentalism, his work on higher education, and his support, as an elder statesman, for the 2000 Vermont law legalizing civil unions for gay couples.

== Early life ==
Stafford was born in Rutland, Vermont, to Bert Linus Stafford and Mabel R. (Stratton) Stafford. Bert Stafford was a 1901 graduate of Middlebury College who practiced law in Rutland, and was President of the Rutland County National Bank. He served as Rutland County's State's Attorney, and was mayor from 1915 to 1917, President of the Vermont Bar Association in 1930, and Chairman of the Vermont Board of Education.

Stafford attended the schools of Rutland and was a 1931 graduate of Rutland High School. He received his Bachelor of Science degree from Middlebury College in 1935. While there, he joined the Delta Upsilon fraternity. He briefly attended the University of Michigan Law School before earning his LL.B. from the Boston University School of Law in 1938.

== Start of career ==
Upon completing law school, Stafford was admitted to the bar and practiced law with the Rutland firm of Stafford, Abatiell, and Stafford. He became active in politics as a Republican and served as Rutland's grand juror (prosecutor in the municipal court) from 1938 to 1942.

== World War II and Navy Reserve service ==
In 1942, Stafford joined the United States Navy Reserve for World War II and was commissioned as an ensign. Assigned to the Intelligence branch, he completed his initial training at Dartmouth College and at Fort Dix, New Jersey. He then carried out intelligence officer postings at the Navy Department in Washington, D.C., and at Navy bases on Cape Cod, Massachusetts.

Stafford later requested sea duty and served as senior watch officer aboard USS West Point, the Navy's largest troop transport ship. During his service aboard West Point, the ship made numerous voyages across the Atlantic to Europe and Africa. Stafford advanced to lieutenant commander during the war, and at its end in 1945 he was the ship's chief transportation officer. He returned to Rutland in February 1946 while continuing to serve in the Navy Reserve.

In October 1951, Stafford returned to active duty during the Korean War era. He was assigned as gunnery officer aboard USS Mission Bay, a Reserve training ship berthed in Bayonne, New Jersey, and served until February 1953. He remained in the Navy Reserve after his second deployment and retired at the rank of captain in March 1971.

== Continued career ==
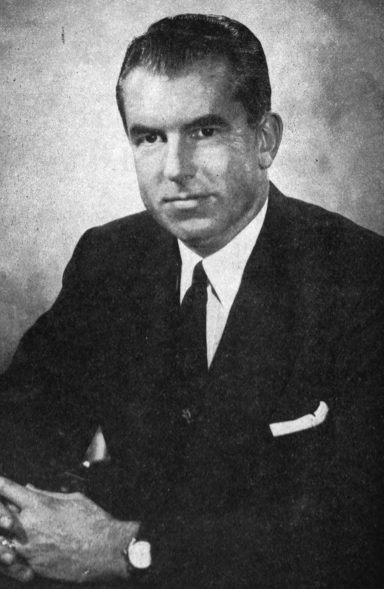
Stafford as governor.

Stafford served as Rutland County's State's Attorney from 1947 to 1951. In addition, he practiced law in a new firm, Stafford and LaBrake.

Following his Korean War-era deployment, he entered Vermont statewide politics, serving as deputy state attorney general for the state from 1953 to 1955. In 1954, he was elected Vermont Attorney General, and he served from 1955 to 1957. In 1956, he was elected lieutenant governor.

== Governor of Vermont ==
In 1958, Stafford was elected governor. His ascent to the lieutenant governorship and governorship was unusual in that he did not follow the path of most Vermont Republicans. From the founding of the party in the 1850s, Republicans in Vermont had made use of the Mountain Rule, which called for candidates for governor and lieutenant governor to alternate between the east and west sides of the Green Mountains, and for governors to serve only two years in office. U.S. Senators were also allocated according to the Mountain Rule, with one from the east and one from the west. Under this system, candidates for governor and lieutenant governor were chosen by the party years in advance, and served in leadership roles in the Vermont General Assembly, including Speaker of the Vermont House of Representatives and President of the Vermont Senate. Stafford is one of Vermont's few governors who did not serve in the legislature. By the late 1950s, the Democratic Party was becoming increasingly competitive in Vermont, and in the 1958 election, Stafford won the governorship over Bernard J. Leddy with only 50.3% of the vote.

Stafford's governorship was notable for initiatives to streamline state government, including creation of the Agency of Administration. In addition, the state invested in infrastructure including roads and bridges to spur economic growth, and enacted scholarships for Vermont students who attended state colleges.

Official Vermont State House portrait

== U.S. Representative ==
In 1960, Stafford was the Republican nominee for Vermont's lone seat in the U.S. House of Representatives, supported by all factions of his party because he was regarded as the strongest challenger to Democrat William H. Meyer, who had broken the Republican Party's 100 year hold on statewide offices by winning election to Congress in 1958. Stafford won, and was reelected four times, serving in the House from January 3, 1961, to September 16, 1971. Stafford voted in favor of the Civil Rights Acts of 1964, and 1968, as well as the 24th Amendment to the U.S. Constitution and the Voting Rights Act of 1965.

== U.S. Senator ==
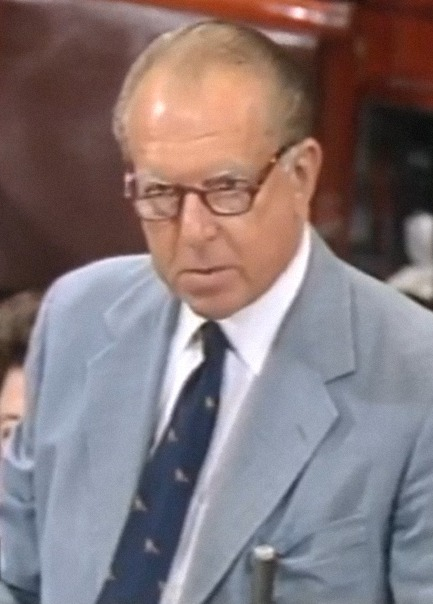
Stafford on the Senate floor, 1986

In September 1971, Stafford resigned his seat in the House to accept appointment to the Senate, temporarily filling the vacancy caused by the death of Winston L. Prouty. Stafford won the January 1972 special election to serve out the rest of Prouty's term and won reelection twice including the 1976 election against outgoing Governor Thomas P. Salmon. He served for slightly over 17 years, until his retirement in 1989. He chaired the Committee on Environment and Public Works from 1981 to 1987.

While in Congress, he helped pass a law, now known as the Robert T. Stafford Disaster Relief and Emergency Assistance Act, or Stafford Act, to coordinate federal natural disaster assistance. Stafford's support of weapons sales to Nicaraguan contras led to the Winooski 44 protest.

As he neared retirement from the Senate, New York Times writer Philip Shabecoff wrote in a profile of Stafford that his tendency to keep his own counsel meant he "may give the worst interview of any public official in the capital." Stafford commented on his own reputation for maintaining a low profile by saying "I talked more when I was younger."

== Later life ==
In his later years, Stafford was regarded as the elder statesman of Vermont Republicans. In 1998, Jack McMullen, a recent arrival to Vermont, declared his candidacy for the Republican nomination for U.S. Senator. As related by Chris Graff, longtime Vermont bureau chief for the Associated Press, McMullen's candidacy sustained an immediate blow when Graff interviewed Stafford about the January 1998 ice storm and other current events. During the discussion, Stafford persistently got McMullen's name wrong, calling him "Mulholland". Graff wrote that he tried to politely correct Stafford, but finally realized that Stafford's intent was to convey his opinion that McMullen was too unknown and too new to Vermont to be a viable candidate. The lede in the resulting story was that Vermont's senior Republican was of the view that McMullen had not lived in the state long enough to represent it in the senate, and Stafford's dismissal of McMullen as "Mulholland or whatever his name is" became a running joke among reporters and political operatives.

In 2000, Stafford lent credibility to Vermont's movement to allow civil unions for gay and lesbian couples. Before the 2000 presidential elections, Stafford explained his decision to support civil unions: "I consider that love is one of the great forces in our society and especially in our state of Vermont. It occurs to me that even if a same-sex couple unites in love, what harm does that do anybody or any society? So I felt compelled to come here and say that."

Stafford died in Rutland on December 23, 2006. He was buried at Evergreen Cemetery in Rutland. His wife Helen Stafford died February 27, 2011, at the age of 93.

== Legacy ==
In 1988, Congress renamed the Federal Guaranteed Student Loan program the Robert T. Stafford Student Loan program, in honor of his work on higher education.

In 2007, Congress renamed the White Rocks National Recreation Area in the State of Vermont as the Robert T. Stafford White Rocks National Recreation Area.

== See also ==
- List of members of the American Legion

Party political offices
Preceded by F. Elliott Barber Jr.	Republican nominee for Vermont Attorney General; 1954	Succeeded by Frederick M. Reed
Preceded by Consuelo N. Bailey	Republican nominee for Lieutenant Governor of Vermont; 1956	Succeeded by Robert S. Babcock
Preceded by Joseph B. Johnson	Republican nominee for Governor of Vermont; 1958	Succeeded by F. Ray Keyser Jr.
Preceded by Winston L. Prouty	Republican nominee for U.S. Senator from Vermont (Class 1); 1972, 1976, 1982	Succeeded by Jim Jeffords
Legal offices
Preceded by F. Elliott Barber, Jr.	Vermont Attorney General; 1955–1957	Succeeded by Frederick M. Reed
Political offices
Preceded by Consuelo N. Bailey	Lieutenant Governor of Vermont; 1957–1959	Succeeded by Robert S. Babcock
Preceded by Joseph B. Johnson	Governor of Vermont; 1959–1961	Succeeded by F. Ray Keyser Jr.
U.S. House of Representatives
Preceded by William H. Meyer	Member of the U.S. House of Representatives from Vermont's at-large congressional district 1961–1971	Succeeded by Richard W. Mallary
U.S. Senate
Preceded by Winston L. Prouty	U.S. senator (Class 1) from Vermont; 1971–1989; Served alongside: George Aiken, Patrick Leahy	Succeeded by Jim Jeffords
Preceded by Jennings Randolph	Chairman of Senate Environment and Public Works Committee; 1981–1987	Succeeded by Quentin N. Burdick
