= Consuelo N. Bailey =

American politician (1899–1976)

Consuelo Northrop Bailey
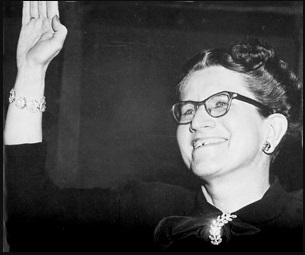
- Bailey being sworn in as Speaker of the Vermont House of Representatives in January 1953

Secretary of the Republican National Committee
- In office 1965–1973

Vice Chair of the Republican National Committee
- In office 1953–1957

66th Lieutenant Governor of Vermont
- In office January 8, 1955 – January 10, 1957
- Governor: Joseph B. Johnson
- Preceded by: Joseph B. Johnson
- Succeeded by: Robert T. Stafford

Speaker of the Vermont House of Representatives
- In office January 8, 1953 – January 8, 1955
- Preceded by: Wallace M. Fay
- Succeeded by: John E. Hancock

Member of the Vermont House of Representatives from South Burlington
- In office January 1951 – January 1955
- Preceded by: Frederick J. Fayette
- Succeeded by: Allen C. Alfred

Member of the Vermont Senate from Chittenden County
- In office January 1931 – January 1933 Serving with Frederick J. Goddette, Theodore E. Hopkins, Walter H. Tupper
- Preceded by: Levi P. Smith, Walter Hill Crockett, Henry A. Bailey, Clarence Morgan
- Succeeded by: Leslie A. Evans, Theodore E. Hopkins, Henry A. B. Palmer, Clarence Morgan

State's Attorney of Chittenden County, Vermont
- In office January 1927 – January 1931
- Preceded by: Ezra M. Horton
- Succeeded by: Frederick W. Wakefield

Grand Juror of Burlington
- In office September 1925 – January 1927
- Preceded by: A. Perley Feen
- Succeeded by: Warren R. Austin Jr.

Chittenden County Justice of the Peace from the city of Burlington
- In office January 1933 – January 1935
- In office January 1923 – January 1927

Personal details
- Born: October 19, 1899 Fairfield, Vermont
- Died: September 9, 1976 (aged 76) Burlington, Vermont
- Party: Republican
- Spouse: Henry A. Bailey (1940–1961, his death)
- Education: University of Vermont; Boston University School of Law
- Profession: Attorney

Consuelo Bailey (née Northrop; October 19, 1899 – September 9, 1976) was an American lawyer, politician, and elected official. She was the first woman to serve as Speaker of the Vermont House of Representatives and as the 66th lieutenant governor of Vermont. She was the first woman in U.S. history to be elected a lieutenant governor.

== Background and earlier career ==
Consuelo Bentina Northrop Bailey was born in Fairfield, Vermont on October 19, 1899, a daughter of Katherine E. (Fletcher) Northrop and Peter Bent Brigham Northrop. Peter Northrop studied at Columbia Law School but decided on a farming career. His venture proved successful, and grew to include a successful dairy farm, creamery, and maple sugar works. An active Republican, he served in town offices and as a member of the Vermont House of Representatives.

Consuelo Bailey was raised in Fairfield and attended elementary school in Sheldon and high school in St. Albans. She graduated from the University of Vermont with a Bachelor of Philosophy degree in 1921. While attending college, she was admitted to the Phi Beta Kappa academic honor society. Bailey taught school in Shelburne for a year, then decided on a legal career.

Bailey attended Boston University School of Law, from which she received her LL.B. degree in 1925. In law school, she was captain of the debating team and served on the editorial staff of The Brief, the school's professional journal. She was admitted to the Vermont Bar in 1925.

She served as Burlington's Grand Juror, the prosecutor in the city court, and in 1926, Bailey became the first woman to be admitted to practice before the Vermont Supreme Court and ran for State's Attorney of Chittenden County. Bailey was then elected to the Vermont Senate in 1930, and served one term. She served as secretary to US Senator Ernest Willard Gibson before returning to Vermont to resume practicing law.

In 1950, Bailey was elected to the Vermont House of Representatives. She served as Speaker of the House from 1953 to 1955, the first woman Speaker of the Vermont House.

== Lieutenant governor of Vermont ==
In 1954 she became the first woman to be elected as lieutenant governor of any state. (Note: Matilda Dodge Wilson of Michigan was the first female lieutenant governor in US history, but was appointed.) Bailey served as 65th Lieutenant Governor of Vermont between 1955 and 1957.

== Later roles ==
Bailey represented Vermont on the Republican National Committee from 1936 to 1976. She was vice chair from 1953 to 1957, and secretary from 1965 to 1973. As secretary, she was responsible for calling the roll of delegates as they voted for president at the 1968 and 1972 Republican National Conventions.

== Death and burial ==
Bailey died in Burlington on September 9, 1976. She was buried at Sheldon Cemetery in Sheldon.

== Family ==
In 1940, Bailey married her husband Henry A. Bailey (1893-1961), an attorney who served in both chambers of the state legislature and as mayor of Winooski.

== See also ==
- List of female lieutenant governors in the United States
- List of female speakers of legislatures in the United States

== Notes ==
Party political offices
Preceded by Joseph B. Johnson	Republican nominee for Lieutenant Governor of Vermont; 1954	Succeeded by Robert Stafford
Political offices
Preceded by Joseph B. Johnson	Lieutenant Governor of Vermont; 1955–1957	Succeeded by Robert T. Stafford
