= List of elections in 1923 =

The following elections occurred in the year 1923.

== Asia ==
- China presidential election
- Egyptian parliamentary election
- Hong Kong sanitary board election
- Persian legislative election
- India
  - Madras Presidency legislative council election
  - general election
- Palestinian Legislative Council election
- Turkish general election
- Turkish presidential election

== Africa ==
- Egyptian parliamentary election
- Liberian general election

== Europe ==
- 1923 Albanian parliamentary election
- 1923 Austrian legislative election
- Bulgaria:
  - April 1923 Bulgarian parliamentary election
  - November 1923 Bulgarian parliamentary election
- Estonia:
  - 1923 Estonian parliamentary election
  - Estonian religious education referendum
- 1923 Greek legislative election
- 1923 Icelandic parliamentary election
- 1923 Irish general election
- Lithuania: 1923 Lithuanian parliamentary election
- 1923 Kingdom of Serbs, Croats and Slovenes parliamentary election
- Latvian church property referendum
- 1923 Portuguese presidential election
- 1923 San Marino general election
- 1923 Spanish general election
- 1923 Swiss referendums
- 1923 Turkish general election
- 1923 Turkish presidential election
- Switzerland: Referendums

=== United Kingdom ===
- 1923 United Kingdom general election
  - England: 1923 United Kingdom general election in England
  - Scotland: 1923 United Kingdom general election in Scotland
  - Wales: 1923 United Kingdom general election in Wales
  - Northern Ireland: 1923 United Kingdom general election in Northern Ireland
  - List of MPs elected in the 1923 United Kingdom general election
- 1923 Morpeth by-election
- 1923 Berwick-upon-Tweed by-election
- 1923 Darlington by-election
- 1923 Ludlow by-election
- 1923 Mitcham by-election
- 1923 Rutland and Stamford by-election
- 1923 Tiverton by-election
- 1923 Whitechapel and St George's by-election
- 1923 Willesden East by-election

== North America ==
=== Canada ===
- 1923 Alberta prohibition plebiscite
- 1923 Edmonton municipal election
- 1923 Newfoundland general election
- 1923 Ontario general election
- 1923 Prince Edward Island general election
- 1923 Quebec general election
- 1923 Toronto municipal election

=== United States ===
- 1923 New York state election

==== United States gubernatorial ====
- 1923 Kentucky gubernatorial election
- 1923 Maryland gubernatorial election
- 1923 Mississippi gubernatorial election
- 1923 United States gubernatorial elections

==== United States House of Representatives ====
- 1923 United States House of Representatives elections

==== United States Senate ====
- 1923 United States Senate elections
- 1923 United States Senate special election in Minnesota
- 1923 United States Senate special election in Vermont

==== United States mayoral elections ====
- 1923 Baltimore mayoral election
- 1923 Chicago mayoral election
- 1923 Los Angeles mayoral election
- 1923 Manchester, New Hampshire mayoral election
- 1923 Philadelphia mayoral election
- 1923 San Diego mayoral election
- 1923 San Francisco mayoral election

== Central and South America ==
- Costa Rican general election
- Guatemalan parliamentary election
- Honduran general election
- Salvadoran presidential election
- Bolivian legislative election

== Oceania ==
=== Australia ===
- Rockhampton state by-election
- 1923 Queensland state election

=== New Zealand ===
- New Zealand Labour Party leadership election
- 1923 Oamaru by-election
- 1923 Tauranga by-election
- Wellington City mayoral election

== See also ==
- Category:1923 elections
