= 1923 United States Senate elections =

- July 16, 1923 – November 6, 1923

2 of the 96 seats in the United States Senate 49 seats needed for a majority
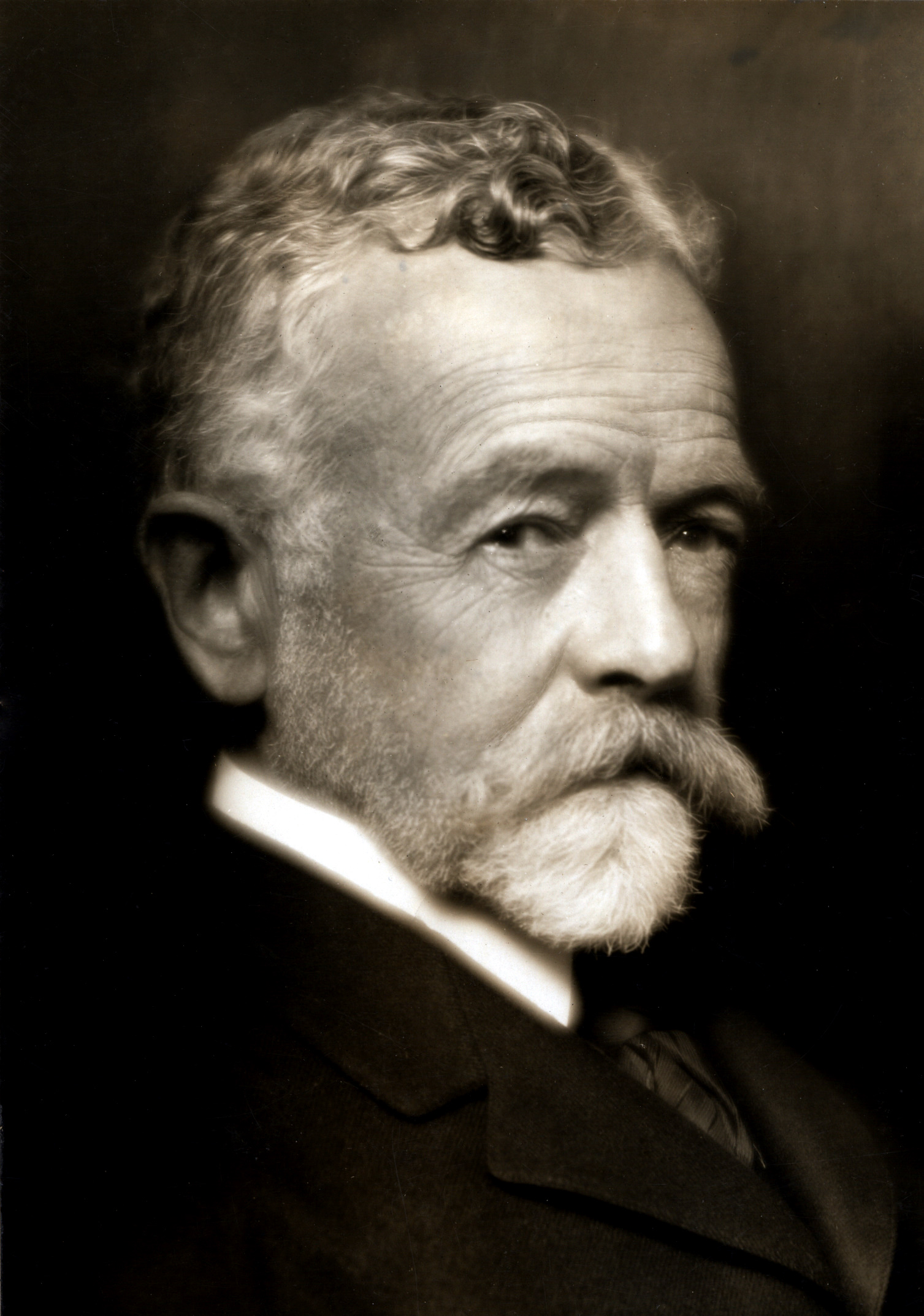

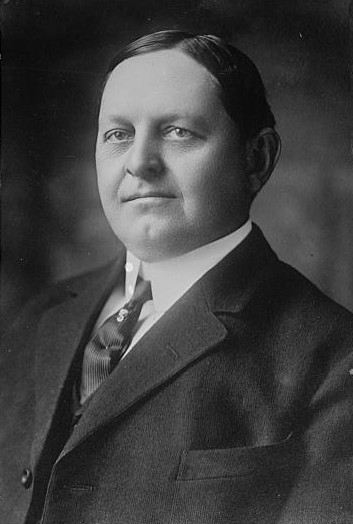
	Majority party	Minority party
Leader	Henry Cabot Lodge (unofficial)	Oscar Underwood
Party	Republican	Democratic
Leader since	March 4, 1919	April 27, 1920
Leader's seat	Massachusetts	Alabama
Seats before	53	42
Seats after	52	42
Seat change	▼1	Steady
Seats up	2	0
Races won	1	0
	Third party
Party	Farmer–Labor
Seats before	1
Seats after	2
Seat change	▲1
Seats up	0
Races won	1

The United States Senate elections of 1923 were special elections that occurred in the near the end of Republican President Warren G. Harding's term. The Farmer-Labor party gained one seat from Republicans who kept the other seat and their majority.

== Change in Senate composition ==
=== Before the elections ===
At the beginning of the 68th Congress in March 1923.

		D_{1}	D_{2}	D_{3}	D_{4}	D_{5}	D_{6}	D_{7}	D_{8}
D_{18}	D_{17}	D_{16}	D_{15}	D_{14}	D_{13}	D_{12}	D_{11}	D_{10}	D_{9}
D_{19}	D_{20}	D_{21}	D_{22}	D_{23}	D_{24}	D_{25}	D_{26}	D_{27}	D_{28}
D_{38}	D_{37}	D_{36}	D_{35}	D_{34}	D_{33}	D_{32}	D_{31}	D_{30}	D_{29}
D_{39}	D_{40}	D_{41}	D_{42}	FL_{1}	R_{53} Died	R_{52} Died	R_{51}	R_{50}	R_{49}
Majority →									R_{49}
R_{39}	R_{40}	R_{41}	R_{42}	R_{43}	R_{44}	R_{45}	R_{46}	R_{47}	R_{48}
R_{38}	R_{37}	R_{36}	R_{35}	R_{34}	R_{33}	R_{32}	R_{31}	R_{30}	R_{29}
R_{19}	R_{20}	R_{21}	R_{22}	R_{23}	R_{24}	R_{25}	R_{26}	R_{27}	R_{28}
R_{18}	R_{17}	R_{16}	R_{15}	R_{14}	R_{13}	R_{12}	R_{11}	R_{10}	R_{9}
		R_{1}	R_{2}	R_{3}	R_{4}	R_{5}	R_{6}	R_{7}	R_{8}

=== After the special elections ===
		D_{1}	D_{2}	D_{3}	D_{4}	D_{5}	D_{6}	D_{7}	D_{8}
D_{18}	D_{17}	D_{16}	D_{15}	D_{14}	D_{13}	D_{12}	D_{11}	D_{10}	D_{9}
D_{19}	D_{20}	D_{21}	D_{22}	D_{23}	D_{24}	D_{25}	D_{26}	D_{27}	D_{28}
D_{38}	D_{37}	D_{36}	D_{35}	D_{34}	D_{33}	D_{32}	D_{31}	D_{30}	D_{29}
D_{39}	D_{40}	D_{41}	D_{42}	FL_{1}	FL_{2} Gain	R_{52} Hold	R_{51}	R_{50}	R_{49}
Majority →									R_{49}
R_{39}	R_{40}	R_{41}	R_{42}	R_{43}	R_{44}	R_{45}	R_{46}	R_{47}	R_{48}
R_{38}	R_{37}	R_{36}	R_{35}	R_{34}	R_{33}	R_{32}	R_{31}	R_{30}	R_{29}
R_{19}	R_{20}	R_{21}	R_{22}	R_{23}	R_{24}	R_{25}	R_{26}	R_{27}	R_{28}
R_{18}	R_{17}	R_{16}	R_{15}	R_{14}	R_{13}	R_{12}	R_{11}	R_{10}	R_{9}
		R_{1}	R_{2}	R_{3}	R_{4}	R_{5}	R_{6}	R_{7}	R_{8}

Key:

D_{#}	Democratic
FL_{#}	Farmer–Labor
R_{#}	Republican

== Elections during the 68th Congress ==
In these special elections, the winners were seated after March 4, 1923.

State	Incumbent			Results	Candidates
State	Senator	Party	Electoral history	Results	Candidates
Minnesota (Class 2)	Knute Nelson	Republican	1895; 1901; 1907; 1913; 1918	Incumbent died April 28, 1923. New senator elected July 16, 1923. Farmer–Labor gain.	▌ ✓ Magnus Johnson (Farmer–Labor) 57.5%; ▌J. A. O. Preus (Republican) 38.7%; ▌James A. Carley (Democratic) 3.8%
Vermont (Class 3)	William P. Dillingham	Republican	1900 (special); 1902; 1908; 1914; 1920	Incumbent died July 23, 1923. New senator elected November 6, 1923. Republican hold.	▌ ✓ Porter H. Dale (Republican) 65.7%; ▌Park Pollard (Democratic) 33.7%

== Minnesota (special) ==
Minnesota special election
- July 16, 1923
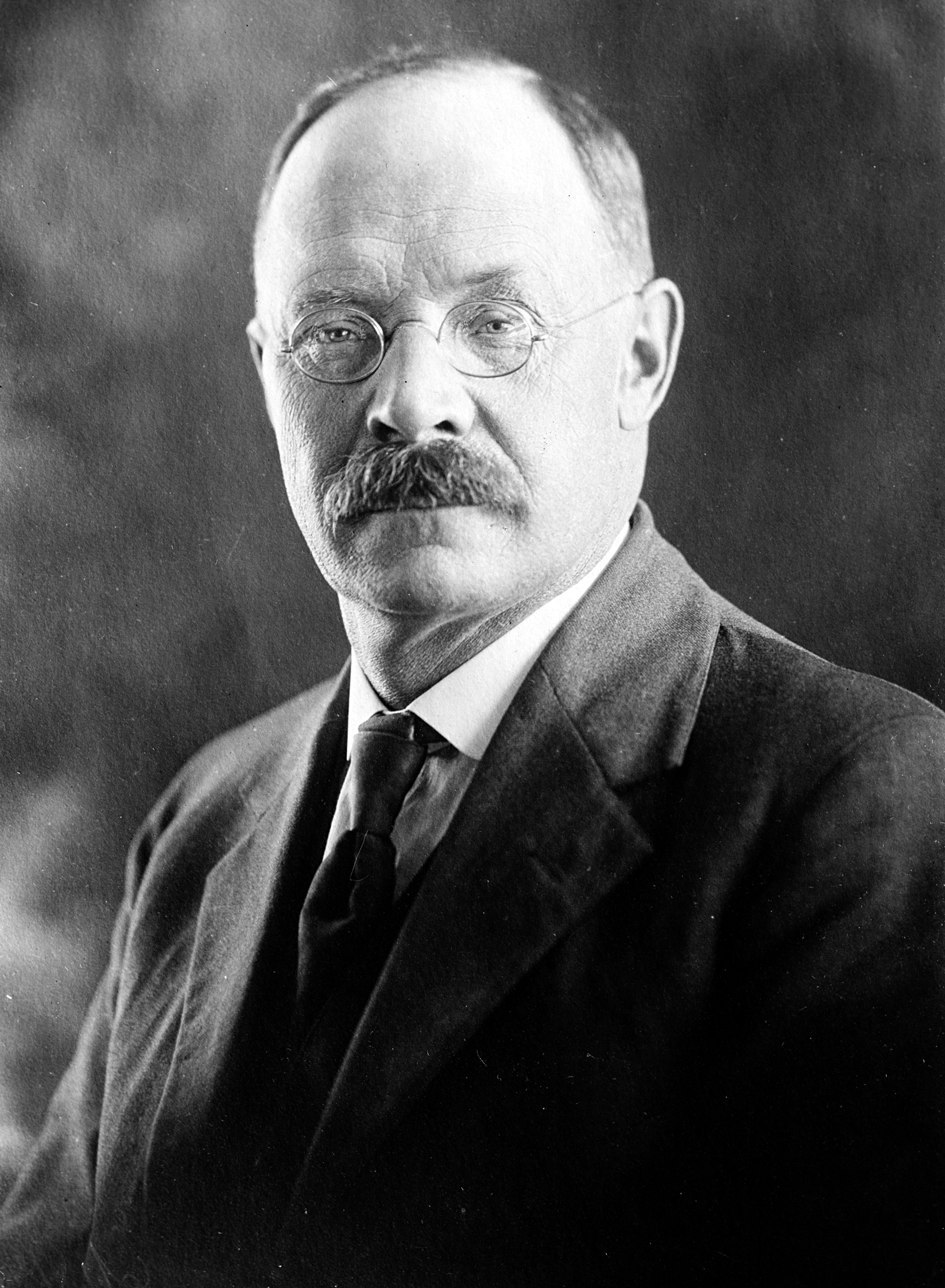

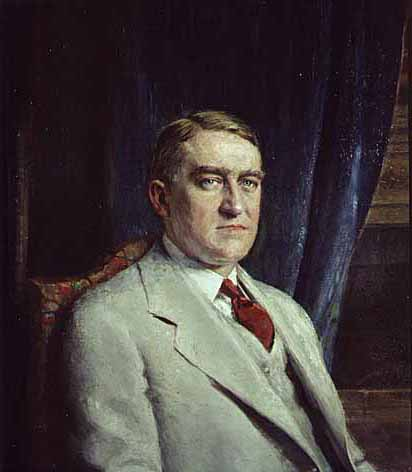
Nominee	Magnus Johnson	J. A. O. Preus
Party	Farmer–Labor	Republican
Popular vote	290,165	195,319
Percentage	57.48%	38.69%
County results
Johnson
30–40%
40–50%
50–60%
60–70%
70–80%
80–90%
Preus
40–50%
50–60%
60–70%
U.S. senator before election
Knute Nelson
Republican
Elected U.S. Senator
Magnus Johnson
Farmer–Labor

Special election
Party	Candidate	Votes	%
Farmer–Labor	Magnus Johnson	290,165	57.48%
Republican	J. A. O. Preus	195,319	38.69%
Democratic	James A. Carley	19,311	3.83%
Total votes		504,795	100.00%
Majority		94,846	18.79%
Farmer–Labor gain from Republican			

== Vermont (special) ==
Vermont special election
- November 6, 1923
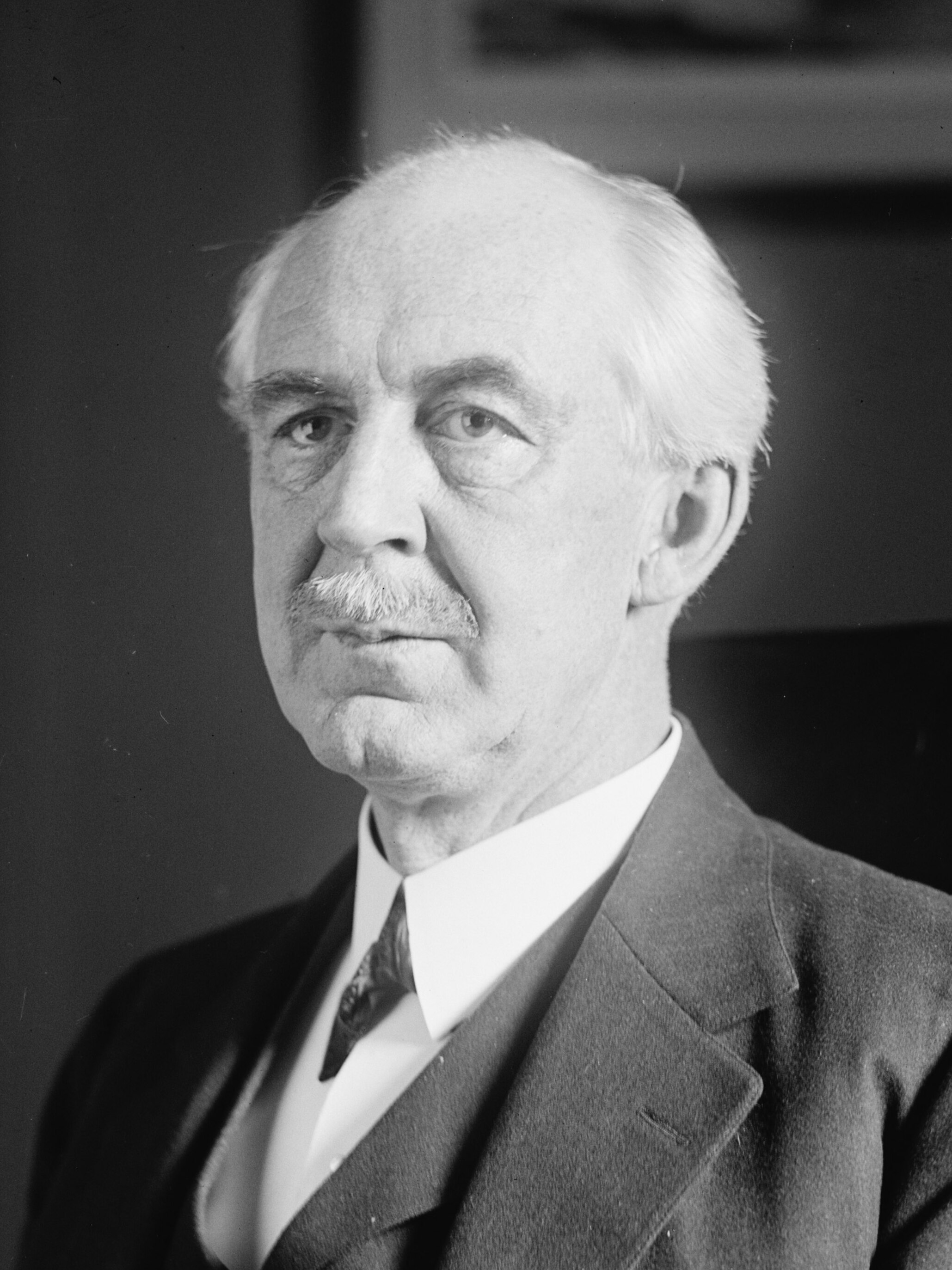

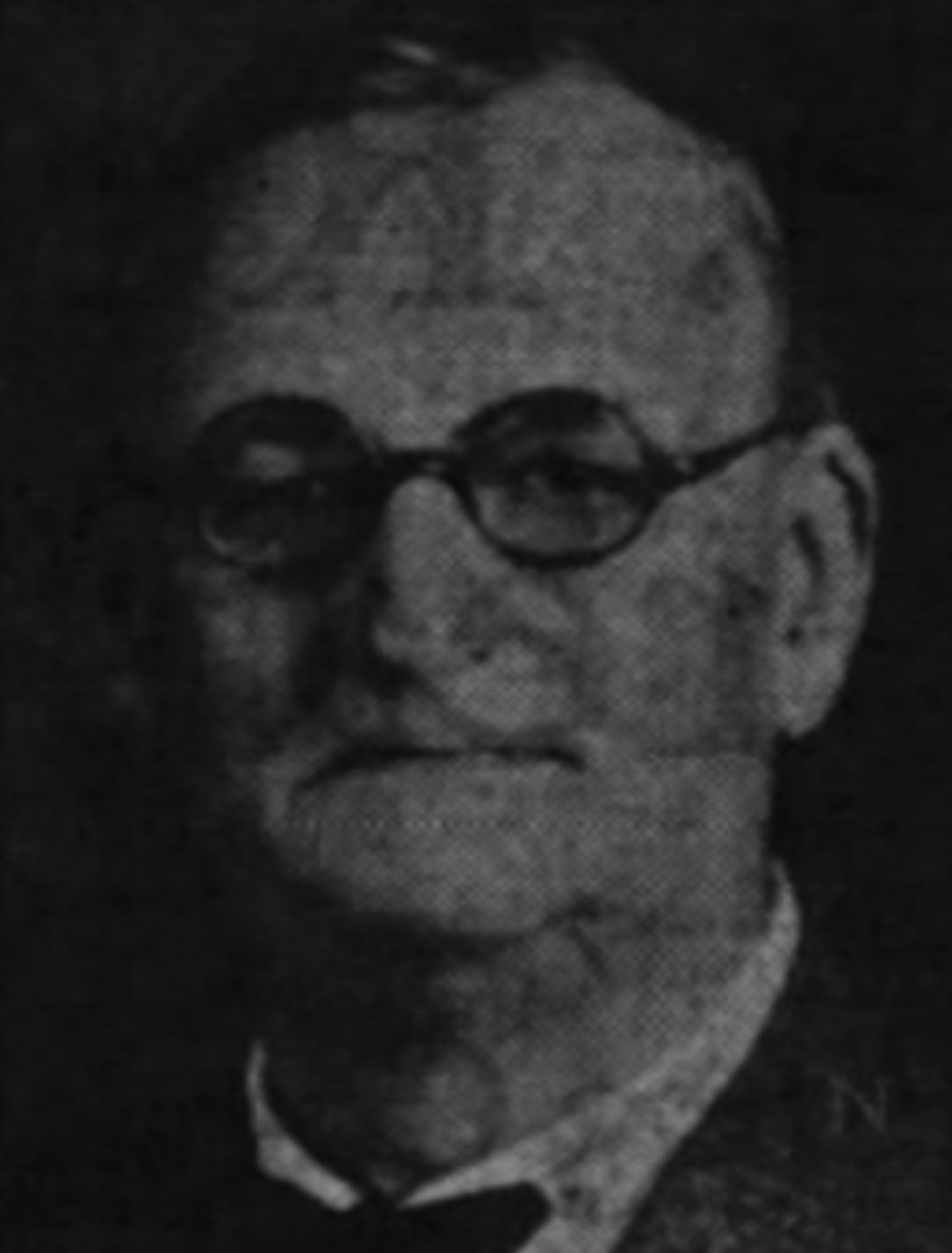
Nominee	Porter H. Dale	Park Pollard
Party	Republican	Democratic
Popular vote	30,388	15,580
Percentage	65.7%	33.7%
- County results Dale: 50–60% 60–70% 70–80% 80–90% Pollard: 50–60%
U.S. senator before election
William P. Dillingham (Deceased)
Republican
Elected U.S. Senator
Porter H. Dale
Republican

Republican primary
Party	Candidate	Votes	%
Republican	Porter H. Dale	26,654	53.7%
Republican	John W. Redmond	13,727	27.6%
Republican	Stanley C. Wilson	9,250	18.6%
Republican	Other	28	0.1%
Total votes		49,659	100.0%

Democratic primary
Party	Candidate	Votes	%
Democratic	Park H. Pollard	1,428	99.0%
Democratic	Other	15	1.0%
Total votes		1,443	100.00%

Special election
Party	Candidate	Votes	%
Republican	Porter H. Dale	30,388	65.7%
Democratic	Park H. Pollard	15,580	33.7%
Conservation	Marshall J. Hapgood	248	0.5%
Total	Other	70	0.1%
Total votes		46,286	100.0%

== See also ==
- 1922 United States elections
- 1922 United States Senate elections
  - 1922 United States House of Representatives elections
- 67th United States Congress
- 68th United States Congress
