= Benjamin Williams (Vermont politician) =

American politician (1876–1957)

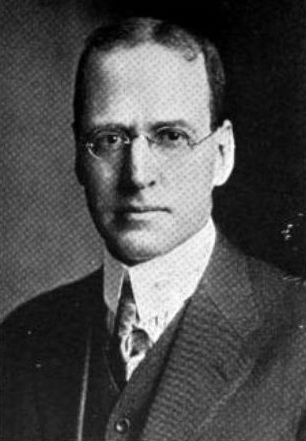
- Benjamin Williams in 1920's "Vermont: Its Government"

58th Lieutenant Governor of Vermont
- In office 1931–1933
- Governor: Stanley C. Wilson
- Preceded by: Stanley C. Wilson
- Succeeded by: Charles M. Smith

Speaker of the Vermont House of Representatives
- In office 1929–1931
- Preceded by: Loren R. Pierce
- Succeeded by: Edward H. Deavitt

Member of the Vermont House of Representatives
- In office 1929–1931
- Preceded by: Guy H. Boyce
- Succeeded by: Guy H. Boyce
- Constituency: Proctor
- In office 1917–1921
- Preceded by: Redfield Proctor Jr.
- Succeeded by: Claude I. Hunter
- Constituency: Proctor

Personal details
- Born: July 8, 1876 Fair Haven, Vermont, US
- Died: February 11, 1957 (aged 80) Proctor, Vermont, US
- Party: Republican
- Profession: Attorney; Banker; Businessman

Benjamin Williams (July 8, 1876 – February 11, 1957) was an American politician who served as Speaker of the Vermont House of Representatives and the 58th lieutenant governor of Vermont.

== Life and career ==
Williams was born in Fair Haven, Vermont on July 8, 1876. He graduated from Norwich University and was an attorney, executive of the Vermont Marble Company, and President of the Proctor Trust Company.

A Republican, Williams served as Proctor's Town Clerk from 1906 to 1918. From 1906 to 1908, he was Secretary of Civil and Military Affairs (chief assistant) to Governor Fletcher D. Proctor.

Williams served in the Vermont House of Representatives from 1917 to 1921. In 1920, he was elected to the Vermont State Senate, and served one term.

In 1928, he returned to the Vermont House, and was chosen to serve as Speaker.

In 1930, Williams was elected Lieutenant Governor, serving from 1931 to 1933.

Williams was an unsuccessful candidate for Governor in 1934, losing the Republican nomination to Charles M. Smith.

Williams died in Proctor, on February 5, 1957, aged 80. He was buried in Fair Haven's West Street Cemetery.

Party political offices
Preceded by Stanley C. Wilson	Republican nominee for Lieutenant Governor of Vermont; 1930	Succeeded by Charles Manley Smith
Political offices
Preceded by Loren R. Pierce	Speaker of the Vermont House of Representatives; 1929 – 1931	Succeeded by Edward H. Deavitt
Preceded by Stanley C. Wilson	Lieutenant Governor of Vermont; 1931 – 1933	Succeeded by Charles M. Smith
