= 1934 Vermont gubernatorial election =

- November 6, 1934
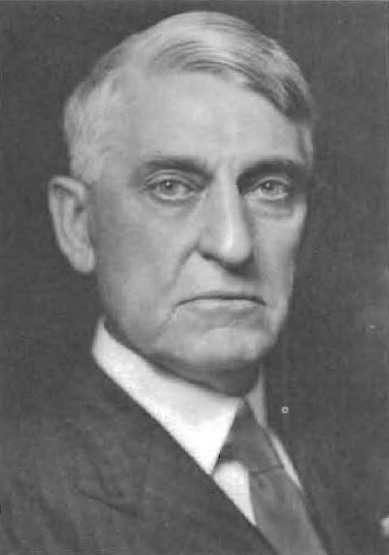

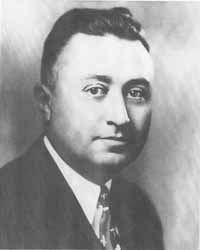
Nominee	Charles M. Smith	James P. Leamy
Party	Republican	Democratic
Popular vote	73,620	53,218
Percentage	57.26%	42.13%
- Smith: 50–60% 60–70% 70–80% 80–90% 90-100% Leamy: 40–50% 50–60% 60–70% 70–80% 90–100% Tie: 50% No Vote/Data
Governor before election
Stanley C. Wilson
Republican
Elected Governor
Charles M. Smith
Republican

The 1934 Vermont gubernatorial election took place on November 6, 1934. Incumbent Republican Stanley C. Wilson did not run for re-election to a third term as Governor of Vermont. Republican candidate Charles M. Smith defeated Democratic candidate James P. Leamy to succeed him.

== Republican primary ==
=== Results ===
Republican primary results
Party	Candidate	Votes	%	±%
Republican	Charles M. Smith	34,503	57.1	
Republican	Benjamin Williams	25,898	42.9	
Republican	Others	19	0.0	
Total votes		60,420	100	

== Democratic primary ==
=== Results ===
Democratic primary results
Party	Candidate	Votes	%	±%
Democratic	James P. Leamy	7,385	99.7	
Democratic	Others	23	0.3	
Total votes		7,408	100	

== General election ==
=== Results ===
1934 Vermont gubernatorial election
Party	Candidate	Votes	%	±%
Republican	Charles M. Smith	73,620	57.26	
Democratic	James P. Leamy	54,159	42.13	
Socialist	John G. Hutton	604	0.47	
Communist	Thomas Boyd	177	0.14	
N/A	Other	5	0.00	
Total votes		128,565	100	
