= Orlando L. Martin =

American politician (1872–1951)

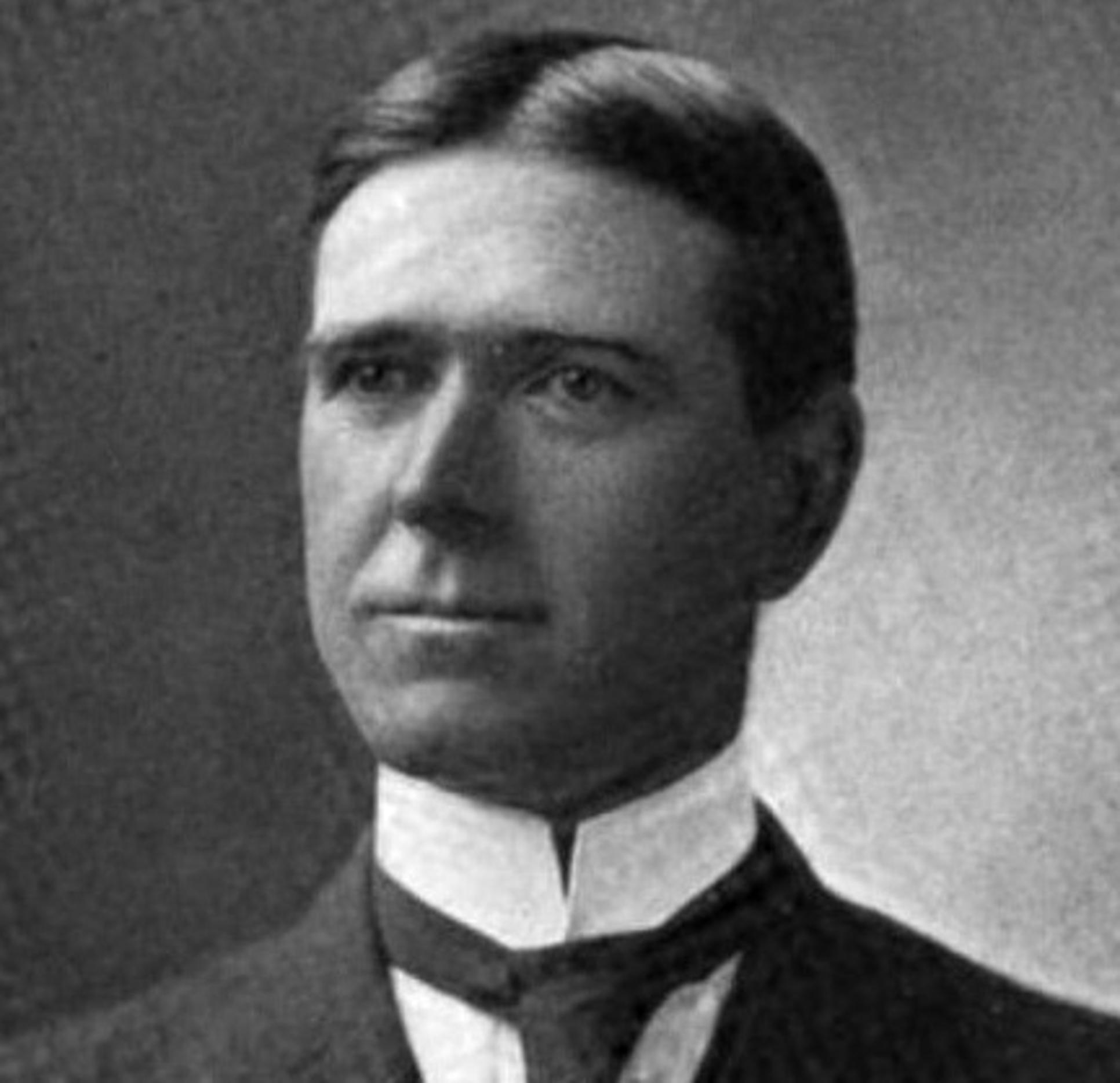

Assistant Judge of Washington County, Vermont
- In office 1939–1951 Serving with Wilmer H. Vaughn (1939); John K. Stone (1941); J. Willsie Brisbin (1949)
- Preceded by: George M. Martin
- Succeeded by: T. Earle Doty

Speaker of the Vermont House of Representatives
- In office 1923–1925
- Preceded by: Franklin S. Billings
- Succeeded by: Roswell M. Austin

Member of the Vermont House of Representatives
- In office 1923–1925
- Preceded by: Walter H. Martin
- Succeeded by: Elroy F. Leavitt
- Constituency: Plainfield
- In office 1908–1910
- Preceded by: Harrison C. Cutting
- Succeeded by: Clement P. Kellogg
- Constituency: Plainfield

Member of the Vermont Senate
- In office 1915–1917 Serving with Heber C. Cady, J. Ward Carver
- Preceded by: Elber B. House, Fred L. Laird, George W. Wallace
- Succeeded by: Frank C. Bancroft, Bertrand R. Demeritt, Fred E. Steele
- Constituency: Washington County

Personal details
- Born: April 28, 1872 Plainfield, Vermont, U.S.
- Died: May 2, 1951 (aged 79) Montpelier, Vermont, U.S.
- Resting place: Plainmont Cemetery, North Montpelier, Vermont, U.S.
- Party: Republican
- Spouse: Alice Glee Kent (m. 1895)
- Children: 1
- Education: Goddard Seminary
- Occupation: School principal Insurance executive

Orlando L. Martin (April 28, 1872 – May 2, 1951) was a Vermont farmer, teacher and politician who served as Speaker of the Vermont House of Representatives.

== Biography ==
Orlando Lewis Martin was born in Plainfield, Vermont on April 28, 1872. He graduated from Goddard Seminary and became a teacher and principal in Plainfield. He was superintendent of schools for several years as well as town meeting moderator, auditor and lister.

A Republican, Martin was a longtime member of the Vermont State Fair Commission. From 1908 to 1910 he served in the Vermont House of Representatives.

After his House term Martin served as Vermont's Commissioner of Agriculture.

From 1915 to 1917 Martin served in the Vermont Senate.

In 1923 Martin returned to the Vermont House and was elected Speaker, serving until 1925. On April 9, 1923, Martin was with the Vermont Secretary of State, Harry A. Black when Black was killed at the train station in Wells River. Black had been ill in the month before his train trip to Montpelier, and according to Martin and other witnesses, Black appeared to faint as he was walking across several tracks to change trains. He fell on one track, and was struck by a moving train. Martin was among those who observed the accident and were unable to render aid to Black before he was killed; Martin was not injured himself.

In 1939 Martin was appointed Washington County Assistant Judge, and he served until his death.

Martin also served as Master of the National Grange and President of the National Grange Fire Insurance Company of Keene, New Hampshire.

In 1895, he married Alice Glee Kent of Calais, Vermont. They had one daughter, Fanny.

Martin was a Universalist.

Judge Martin died in Montpelier, Vermont on May 2, 1951. He was buried at Plainmont Cemetery in North Montpelier.

Political offices
Preceded by Franklin S. Billings	Speaker of the Vermont House of Representatives; 1923–1925	Succeeded by Roswell M. Austin
