= Marvin Dana =

American author and journalist

Marvin Hill Dana (March 2, 1867 – April 3, 1926) was an American author and journalist.

== Life ==
Dana was born in Cornwall, Vermont to Edward Summers Dana and Mary Howe Dana (née Squier). He was the younger brother of Charles S. Dana. After graduating from Beeman Academy in New Haven, Vermont, he attended Middlebury College, where he received a Bachelor of Arts degree in 1886 and a Master of Arts in 1889. He also obtained a Bachelor of Laws from Albany Law School in 1888.

After working as a lawyer in Missouri and New York, he did post-graduate studies at Columbia University and attended the General Theological Seminary. During this time he wrote his first published book, a collection of poetry titled Mater Christi and Other Poems. He was ordained in the Episcopal Church in June 1893. He served at St. John's Episcopal Church in Stillwater, New York, then at the Church of the Messiah in Rensselaer, New York.

Dana left the ministry and turned to journalism. He worked for the New York Herald, then in 1896 he was the editor of The Hungarian-American magazine. He moved to London, where he edited the satirical magazine Judy from 1897 to 1900 and wrote poems and articles for The Pall Mall Gazette. His first novel, The Woman of Orchids, was published in 1901. He returned to New York to work at another magazine, The Smart Set, first as an assistant editor, then as editor from 1902 to 1904.

Dana married his cousin Gertrude M. Hill in July 1894. They divorced in 1905. Dana married Florence Mabel Elliot in September 1911. Dana died in New York City on April 3, 1926.

== Works ==
Dana's writings included non-fiction, poetry, and novels.

=== Fiction and poetry ===
- Mater Christi and Other Poems (1890)
- The Woman of Orchids (1901)
- A Puritan Witch (1903)
- The Master Mind (1913), based on a play by Daniel D. Carter
- The Shooting of Dan McGrew (1915), based on a poem by Robert W. Service
- Within the Law (1913), based on a play by Bayard Veiller
- The Lake Mystery (1923)
- The Mystery of the Third Parrot (1924)

=== Non-fiction ===
- A Perfect Memory: How to Have and Keep It (1917)
- How to Train Your Mind: A Practical Method for the Development of Mental Power (1918)
- Military Pyrotechnics (1919), co-authored with Henry B. Faber
- Spelling Made Easy (1919)
- Shorthand Made Easy (1919)
- Grammar Made Easy (1919)
- Arithmetic Made Easy (1919)
- Law at a Glance (1920)
- The American Encyclopedia of Etiquette and Culture (1922)
