= Charles Manley Smith =

American politician from Vermont (1868–1937)

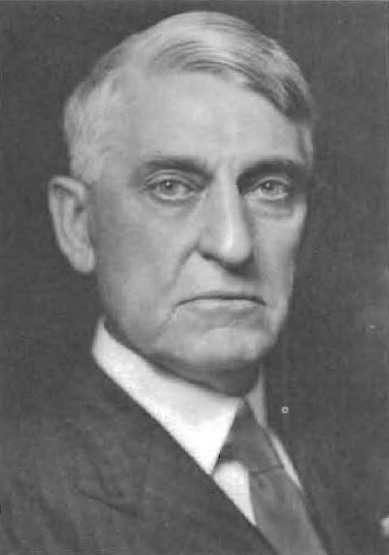

63rd Governor of Vermont
- In office January 10, 1935 – January 7, 1937
- Lieutenant: George Aiken
- Preceded by: Stanley C. Wilson
- Succeeded by: George Aiken

59th Lieutenant Governor of Vermont
- In office 1933–1935
- Governor: Stanley C. Wilson
- Preceded by: Benjamin Williams
- Succeeded by: George Aiken

Member of the Vermont House of Representatives
- In office 1931–1933
- Preceded by: Annie J. Moloney
- Succeeded by: Charles T. Quigley
- Constituency: Rutland City

Member of the Vermont Senate
- In office 1927–1931 Serving with Lewellyn J. Eggleston, Dan D. Burditt, Edward A. Ellis (1926); Leonard F. Croft, Guy Herbert Boyce, Herbert C. Comings (1928)
- Preceded by: Lewellyn J. Eggleston, Edwin W. Lawrence, Cecil E. McIntyre, Leo T. Pratt
- Succeeded by: Edward H. Clark, Lewellyn J. Eggleston, Clarence H. Murdick, E. Lewis Olney
- Constituency: Rutland County

Personal details
- Born: August 3, 1868 West Rutland, Vermont, U.S.
- Died: August 12, 1937 (aged 69) Rutland, Vermont, U.S.
- Resting place: Evergreen Cemetery, Rutland, Vermont, U.S.
- Party: Republican
- Spouse: Mary A. Stark (1864–1935)
- Children: 3
- Education: Dartmouth College
- Profession: Banker

Charles Manley Smith (August 3, 1868 – August 12, 1937) was an American politician from Vermont. He served as the 59th lieutenant governor of Vermont from 1933 to 1935 and 63rd governor of Vermont from 1935 to 1937.

== Life and career ==
Smith was born in West Rutland, Vermont, on August 3, 1868, a son of Hiram A. Smith and Helen (Manley) Smith. He graduated from Dartmouth College in 1891 and served as private secretary to former Vermont Governor Redfield Proctor when Proctor was Secretary of War.

Active in banking and insurance, Smith became President of Marble Savings Bank in 1920.

A Republican, Smith served in the Vermont State Senate from 1927 to 1931and was chaieman of the body's banking committee. He was a member of the Vermont House of Representatives from 1931 to 1933 and was Ways and Means Committee Chairman. He served as Lieutenant Governor from 1933 to 1935.

Smith was elected Governor in 1934 and served from 1935 to 1937. During his administration, the state legislature approved old age pension and unemployment compensation laws.

In December 1936, Smith and other Marble Bank officials were charged with fraud for failing to inform account holders and authorities about an embezzlement. In May 1932, Smith had learned that his bank's bookkeeper had stolen $251,000. Smith let him leave quietly, kept the theft secret, and charged the loss against the bank's surplus.

In July 1935, the bookkeeper was named Rutland's Assistant City Treasurer and planned a candidacy for Treasurer. To prevent this, his opponents leaked word of the theft to the press. The bookkeeper was convicted and jailed, and the bank Treasurer received a suspended sentence and a $400 fine. Charges against most other parties were dismissed, and Smith was acquitted at his trial.

== Personal life ==
Smith married Mary Aurelia Stark and they had three children. Dorothy was the wife of Andrew C. Matthews. Charlotte was the wife of Theodore Nicolet. Manley Stark Smith was serving in the military during World War I when he died in 1918.

In 1936, Smith was injured in a car accident and his health began to decline. He became ill in June 1937 and died on August 12, 1937, aged 69, just eight months after leaving office. He is interred at Evergreen Cemetery, Rutland, Vermont.

Party political offices
Preceded by Benjamin Williams	Republican nominee for Lieutenant Governor of Vermont; 1932	Succeeded by George Aiken
Preceded by Stanley C. Wilson	Republican nominee for Governor of Vermont; 1934	Succeeded by George Aiken
Political offices
Preceded by Benjamin Williams	Lieutenant Governor of Vermont; 1933–1935	Succeeded by George Aiken
Preceded by Stanley C. Wilson	Governor of Vermont; 1935–1937	Succeeded by George D. Aiken
