= 1942 Vermont gubernatorial election =

- November 3, 1942
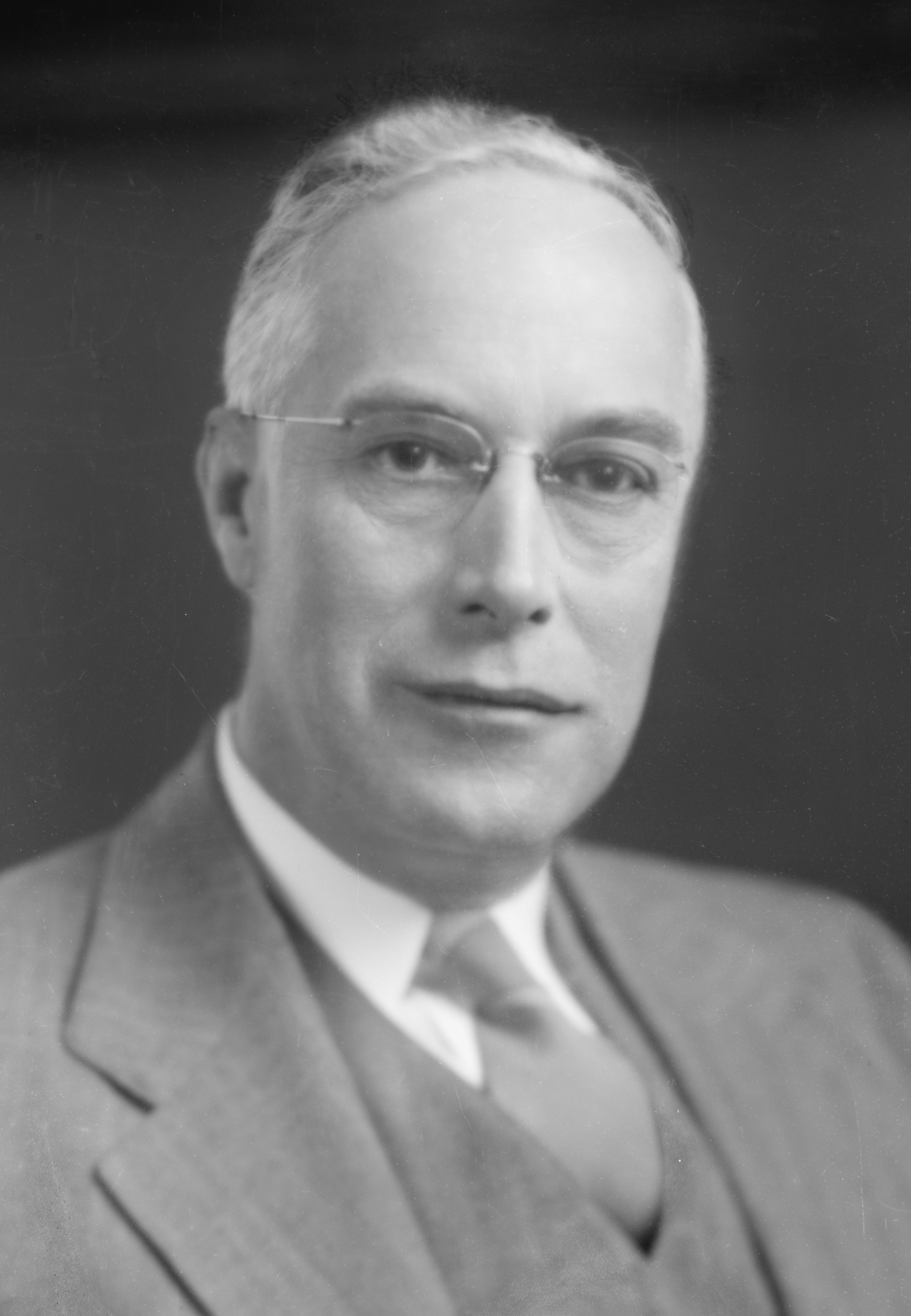

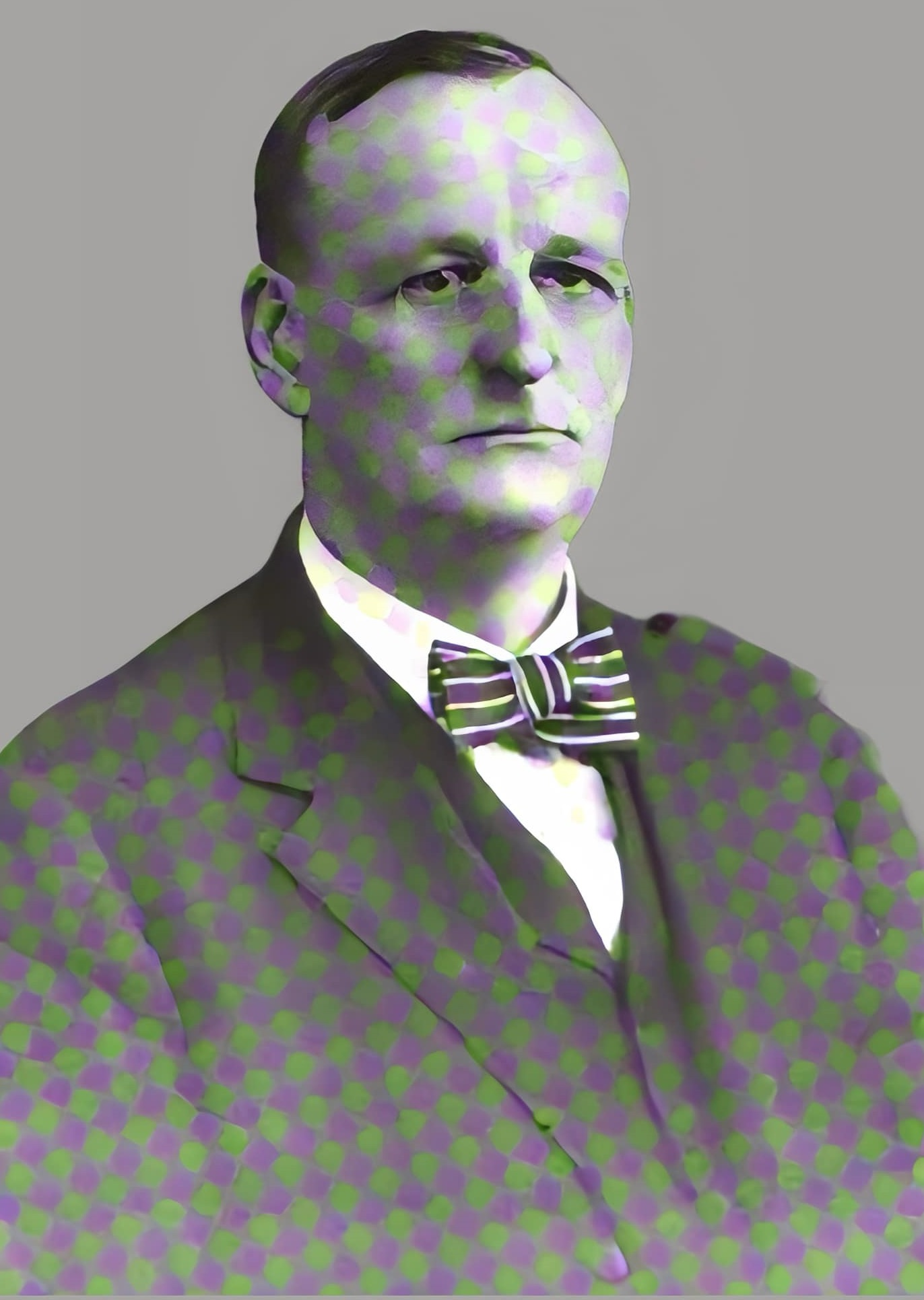
Nominee	William H. Wills	Park H. Pollard
Party	Republican	Democratic
Popular vote	44,804	12,708
Percentage	77.90%	22.10%
- Wills: 50–60% 60–70% 70–80% 80–90% 90-100% Pollard: 50–60% 80–90% Tie: 50% No Vote/Data
Governor before election
William H. Wills
Republican
Elected Governor
William H. Wills
Republican

The 1942 Vermont gubernatorial election took place on November 3, 1942. Incumbent Republican William H. Wills ran successfully for re-election to a second term as Governor of Vermont, defeating Democratic candidate Park H. Pollard.

== Republican primary ==
=== Results ===
Republican primary results
Party	Candidate	Votes	%	±%
Republican	William H. Wills (inc.)	29,545	99.9	
Republican	Other	3	0.0	
Total votes		29,548	100.0	

== Democratic primary ==
=== Results ===
Democratic primary results
Party	Candidate	Votes	%	±%
Democratic	Park H. Pollard	2,296	99.5	
Democratic	Other	11	0.5	
Total votes		2,307	100.0	

== General election ==
- William H. Wills, incumbent Governor of Vermont
- Park Pollard, Chairman of the Vermont Democratic Party and former state representative

=== Results ===
1942 Vermont gubernatorial election
Party	Candidate	Votes	%	±%
Republican	William H. Wills (inc.)	44,804	77.90	
Democratic	Park H. Pollard	12,708	22.10	
N/A	Other	1	0.00	
Total votes		57,513	100.0	
