= 1930 Vermont gubernatorial election =

- November 4, 1930
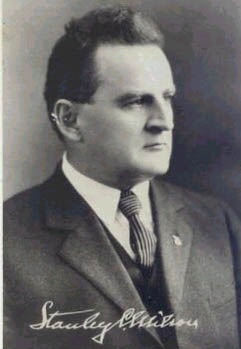

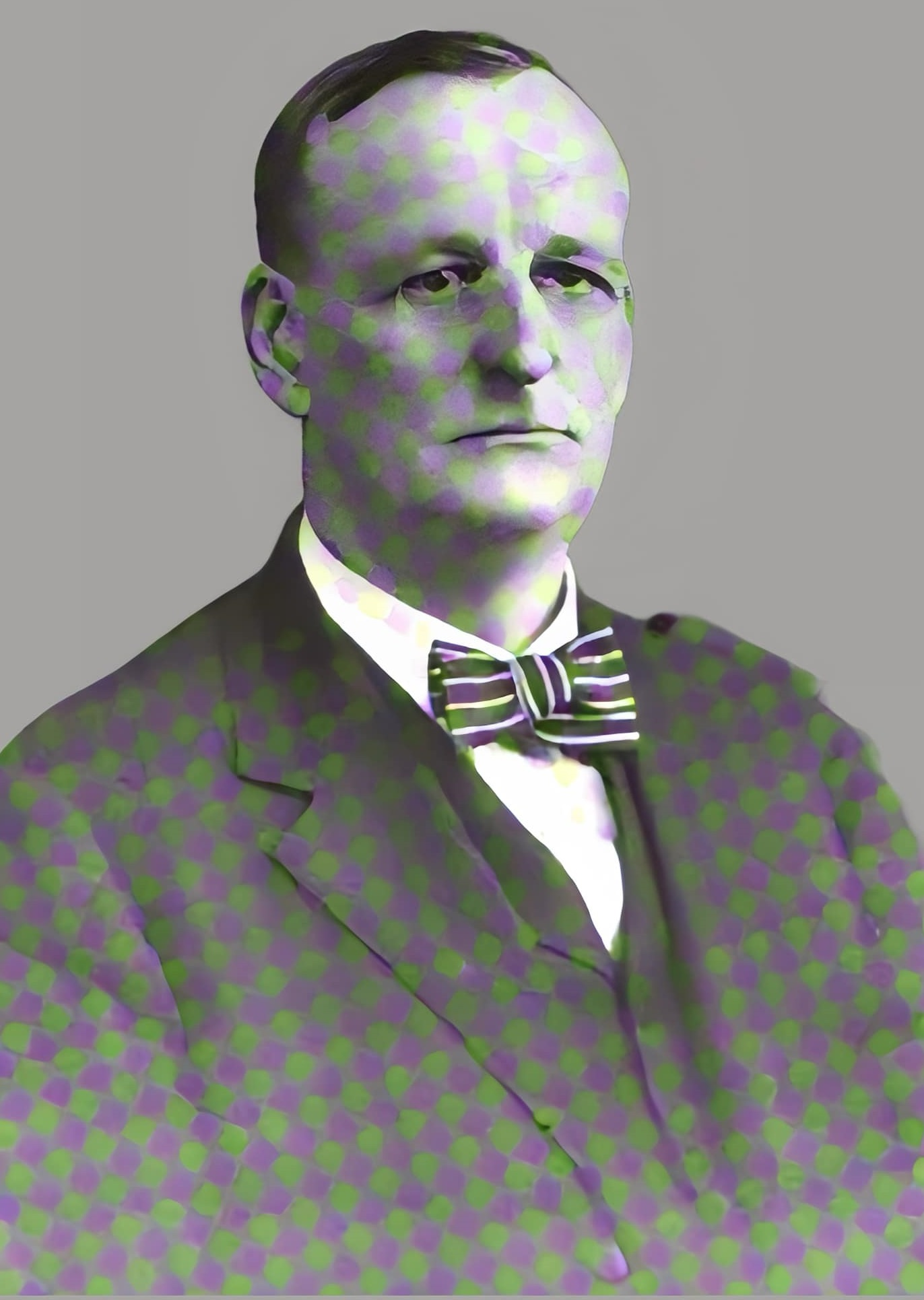
Nominee	Stanley C. Wilson	Park H. Pollard
Party	Republican	Democratic
Popular vote	52,836	21,540
Percentage	70.98%	28.94%
- Wilson: 50–60% 60–70% 70–80% 80–90% 90-100% Pollard: 50–60% 60–70% 70–80% No Vote/Data
Governor before election
John E. Weeks
Republican
Elected Governor
Stanley C. Wilson
Republican

The 1930 Vermont gubernatorial election took place on November 4, 1930. Incumbent Republican John E. Weeks did not run for re-election to a third term as Governor of Vermont. Republican candidate Stanley C. Wilson defeated Democratic candidate Park H. Pollard to succeed him.

== Republican primary ==
=== Candidates ===
- John W. Gordon, former Barre mayor, former member of Vermont Senate and Vermont House, candidate for U.S. Representative in 1920 and 1924
- W. Arthur Simpson, Lyndon selectman and State Senator
- Stanley C. Wilson, Lieutenant Governor

=== Results ===
Republican primary results
Party	Candidate	Votes	%	±%
Republican	Stanley C. Wilson	31,326	51.1%	
Republican	W. Arthur Simpson	25,004	40.8%	
Republican	John W. Gordon	4,916	8.0%	
Republican	Other	11	0.07%	
Total votes		61,257	100.00%	

== Democratic primary ==
=== Candidates ===
- Park H. Pollard, nominee for U.S. Senate in 1923

=== Results ===
Democratic primary results
Party	Candidate	Votes	%	±%
Democratic	Park H. Pollard	1,723	96.7	
Democratic	Other	58	3.3	
Total votes		1,781	100.0	

== General election ==
=== Results ===
1930 Vermont gubernatorial election
Party	Candidate	Votes	%	±%
Republican	Stanley C. Wilson	52,836	70.98	
Democratic	Park H. Pollard	21,540	28.94	
N/A	Other	64	0.08	
Total votes		74,440	100.0	
