= James Patrick Leamy =

American judge (1892–1949)

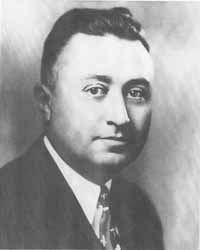
- "James P. Leamy Elected President of State Bar Association". Burlington Free Press, October 6, 1938.

Judge of the United States District Court for the District of Vermont
- In office May 7, 1940 – July 22, 1949
- Appointed by: Franklin D. Roosevelt
- Preceded by: Harland Bradley Howe
- Succeeded by: Ernest W. Gibson Jr.

President of the Vermont Bar Association
- In office 1938–1939
- Preceded by: Arthur L. Graves
- Succeeded by: Neil D. Clawson

Personal details
- Born: January 16, 1892; West Rutland, Vermont, U.S.
- Died: July 22, 1949 (aged 57); West Rutland, Vermont, U.S.
- Resting place: Saint Bridgets Cemetery, West Rutland
- Political party: Democratic
- Spouse: Margaret Lalor (m. 1927)
- Children: 1
- Education: College of the Holy Cross (BA); Boston College (MA); Harvard University (LLB)
- Occupation: Attorney

James Patrick Leamy (January 16, 1892 – July 22, 1949) was a United States district judge of the United States District Court for the District of Vermont.

== Education and career ==
Leamy was born in West Rutland, Vermont on January 16, 1892, the son of James Leamy and Catherine (Clark) Leamy. He was educated in West Rutland and graduated from West Rutland High School. He received a Bachelor of Arts degree from College of the Holy Cross in 1912, a Master of Arts degree from Boston College in 1913, and a Bachelor of Laws from Harvard Law School in 1915. He was admitted to the bar in 1916 and began a private practice in Rutland, Vermont from 1916 to 1940. He was a United States Commissioner for the United States District Court for the District of Vermont from 1917 to 1931, (Note: U.S. District Court Commissioners were appointed by district court judges and empowered to issue search and arrest warrants, set bail for defendants and conduct other initial proceedings in federal criminal cases.) and a Referee in Bankruptcy for the United States District Court for the District of Vermont from 1931 to 1940.

== Political career ==
Leamy was a Democrat, and served in local offices including school board member. He also served as chairman of the Democratic Party in West Rutland and in Rutland County. His uncle Frank Duffy was Vermont's longtime member of the Democratic National Committee, and Leamy served as Chairman of the Vermont Democratic Party during the period of more than 100 years when Republicans won every election for statewide office in Vermont. Leamy ran unsuccessfully for Vermont Attorney General (1920, 1922), State's Attorney of Rutland County (1924), Governor of Vermont (1932, 1934) and Congressman from Vermont (1938). From 1938 to 1939 he was President of the Vermont Bar Association.

== Federal judicial service ==
On April 12, 1940, Leamy was nominated by President Franklin D. Roosevelt to a seat on the United States District Court for the District of Vermont vacated by Judge Harland Bradley Howe. Leamy was confirmed by the United States Senate on April 30, 1940, and received his commission on May 7, 1940. He served until his death from a heart attack in West Rutland on July 2, 1949. Leamy was buried at Saint Bridgets Cemetery in West Rutland.

== Family ==
In 1927, Leamy married Margaret Lalor (1893–1984) of Rutland. They were the parents of a son, James Jr.

== Sources ==
- Vermont Bar Association: Past Presidents, 2014
- Ballotpedia: Vermont gubernatorial elections, 1791-present, 2014

Party political offices
Preceded by Harry C. Shurtleff	Democratic nominee for Vermont Attorney General; 1920, 1922	Succeeded by Joseph A. McNamara
Preceded by Park H. Pollard	Democratic nominee for Governor of Vermont; 1932, 1934	Succeeded by Alfred Heininger
Legal offices
Preceded by Harland Bradley Howe	Judge of the United States District Court for the District of Vermont; 1940–1949	Succeeded by Ernest W. Gibson Jr.
