= 1932 Vermont gubernatorial election =

- November 8, 1932
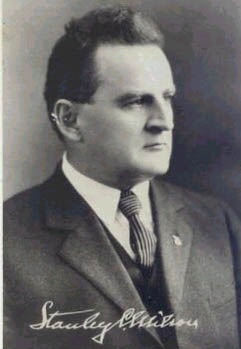

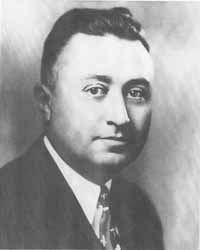
Nominee	Stanley C. Wilson	James P. Leamy
Party	Republican	Democratic
Popular vote	81,656	49,247
Percentage	61.69%	37.20%
- Wilson: 40–50% 50–60% 60–70% 70–80% 80–90% 90-100% Leamy: 50–60% 60–70% 70–80% 90–100% No Vote/Data
Governor before election
Stanley C. Wilson
Republican
Elected Governor
Stanley C. Wilson
Republican

The 1932 Vermont gubernatorial election took place on November 8, 1932. Incumbent Republican Stanley C. Wilson ran successfully for re-election to a second term as Governor of Vermont, defeating Democratic candidate James P. Leamy and Socialist candidate Fred W. Suitor.

== Republican primary ==
=== Results ===
Republican primary results
Party	Candidate	Votes	%	±%
Republican	Stanley C. Wilson (inc.)	40,737	54.0	
Republican	W. Arthur Simpson	34,674	46.0	
Republican	Other	5	0.0	
Total votes		75,416	100	

== Democratic primary ==
=== Results ===
Democratic primary results
Party	Candidate	Votes	%	±%
Democratic	James P. Leamy	3,822	97.0	
Democratic	Others	117	3.0	
Total votes		3,939	100	

== General election ==
=== Results ===
1932 Vermont gubernatorial election
Party	Candidate	Votes	%	±%
Republican	Stanley C. Wilson (inc.)	81,656	61.69	
Democratic	James P. Leamy	49,247	37.20	
Socialist	Fred W. Suitor	1,447	1.09	
N/A	Others	23	0.02	
Total votes		132,373	100	
