= Loren R. Pierce =

American politician

Loren R. Pierce (December 26, 1878 – June 24, 1961) was a Vermont attorney and politician who had a long career in the Vermont General Assembly. In addition to serving multiple terms in the Vermont House of Representatives and Vermont Senate, Pierce served one term as Speaker of the House.

== Biography ==
Loren Ray Pierce was born in Londonderry, Vermont on December 26, 1878. He was educated in Londonderry and taught school while studying law. He received a law degree from Huntingdon, Tennessee's Southern Normal University in 1901. He was admitted to the bar in 1903, and began a practice in Londonderry.

Pierce continued to remain active in the public schools; in 1904 he was the Windham County test administrator and examiner for prospective school teachers. In 1915 Pierce moved to Woodstock, where he continued to practice law.

Pierce served in the United States Army during World War I. After completing officer's training at Plattsburgh in 1917 Pierce served in: Camp Stanley (part of Camp Bullis), Texas; Camp Wadsworth, Spartanburg, South Carolina; and Camp Upton, New York. He served in France throughout the second half of 1918 and all of 1919, and held the rank of captain at the time of his discharge in 1920. He maintained his membership in the Army Reserve and retired as a lieutenant colonel.

A Republican, Pierce took part in several local and county nominating conventions in the early 1900s. He was elected to the Vermont House in 1926. He was elected Speaker in his first term, serving from 1927 to 1929. He was reelected to his House seat in 1928, but was defeated for reelection as Speaker in 1929 by Benjamin Williams. Pierce completed his House term, which expired in 1931. In 1930 he was elected to the Vermont Senate, serving from 1931 to 1933.

Pierce was an unsuccessful candidate for the Republican Congressional nomination in 1932, losing to Ernest W. Gibson. Gibson had been an incumbent in one of the two Vermont districts that existed prior to the 1930 census, and the 1932 election was the first one after Vermont's representation in the House was reduced to one at-large seat.

In 1933 Pierce was an unsuccessful candidate for the Republican nomination for Vermont's seat in Congress, which was left vacant when Gibson moved to the United States Senate.

In 1942 Pierce made headlines nationally as the attorney for columnist Dorothy Thompson in her divorce proceedings against Sinclair Lewis.

Pierce continued to serve in both houses of the Vermont legislature, winning election to the House in 1938, 1952 and 1958, and the Senate in 1960. He was a member of the State Senate when he died in Woodstock on June 24, 1961. Loren Pierce was buried in Woodstock's Riverside Cemetery.

Political offices
Preceded by Roswell M. Austin	Speaker of the Vermont House of Representatives; 1927–1929	Succeeded by Benjamin Williams
