= Park Pollard =

American businessman and politician

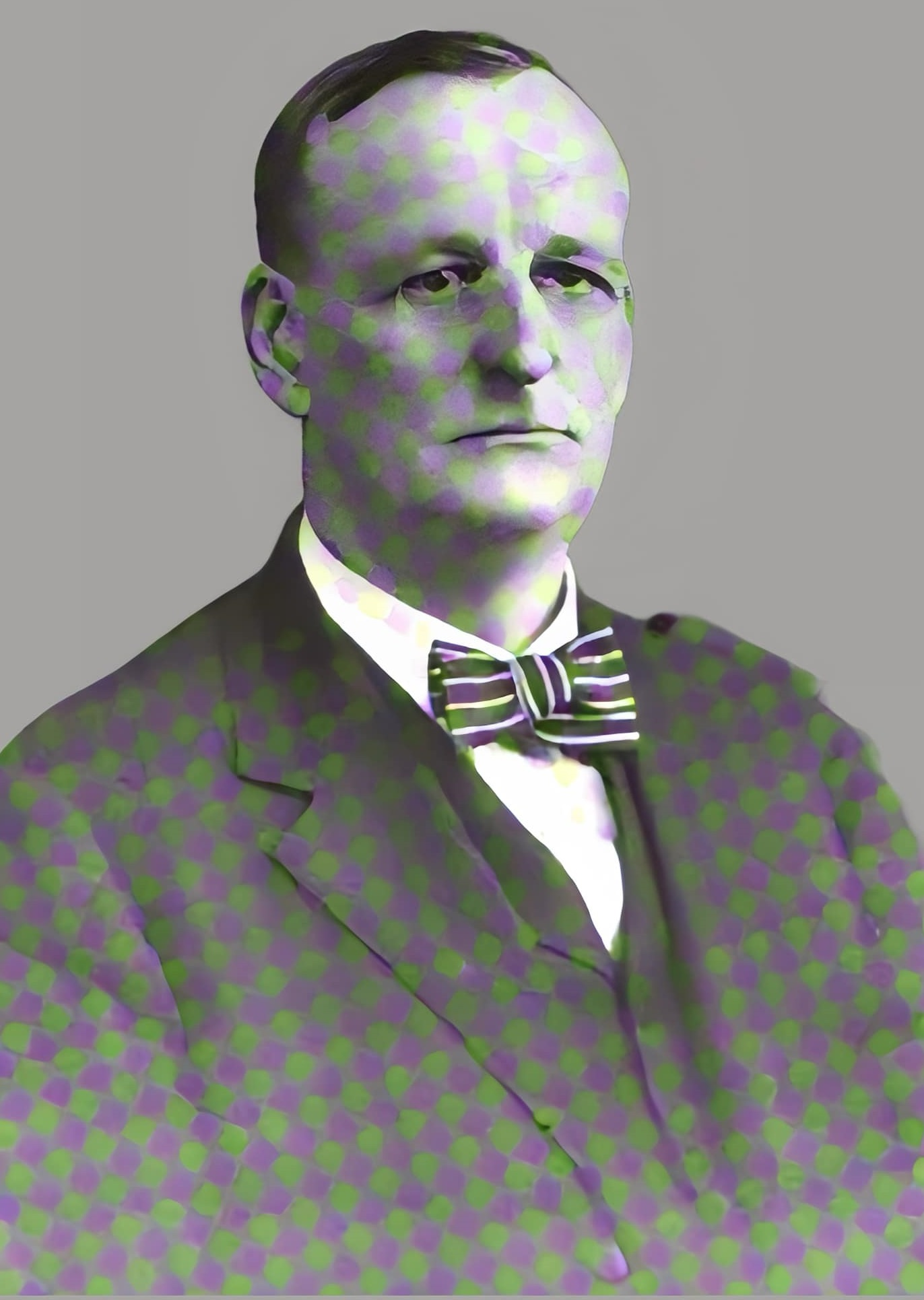
- Rutland Herald (Rutland, Vermont), November 2, 1923. Restored version of original photo.

Member of the Vermont House of Representatives from Cavendish
- In office January 4, 1933 – January 8, 1935
- Preceded by: Leon A. Gay
- Succeeded by: Richard P. Parker
- In office January 5, 1921 – January 6, 1925
- Preceded by: Ira A. Belknap
- Succeeded by: Benjamin J. Hoxie
- In office January 3, 1917 – January 7, 1919
- Preceded by: George H. Parker
- Succeeded by: Ira A. Belknap

Member of the Vermont Public Service Commission
- In office September 3, 1913 – February 4, 1915 Serving with Robert C. Bacon, William R. Warner
- Preceded by: George H. Babbitt
- Succeeded by: Walter A. Dutton

Chairman of the Vermont Democratic Party
- In office September 29, 1916 – June 12, 1942
- Preceded by: James E. Kennedy
- Succeeded by: Charles P. McDevitt

Personal details
- Born: June 5, 1869 Proctorsville, Vermont, U.S.
- Died: December 26, 1955 (aged 86) Waterbury, Vermont, U.S.
- Resting place: Hillcrest Cemetery, Proctorsville, Vermont, U.S.
- Party: Democratic
- Spouse(s): Edith Mary Johnson (m. 1894); Julia Rose (McNulty) Rollinson (m. 1931)
- Relations: Calvin Coolidge (cousin)
- Children: 1
- Occupation: Merchant; Pharmacist

Park H. Pollard (June 5, 1869 – December 26, 1955) was an American politician and businessman who served from 1912 to 1942 as chairman of the Democratic Party of Vermont, as well as several terms in the Vermont House of Representatives where he represented the town of Cavendish. He was the Democratic nominee for the U.S. Senate in 1923, and for Governor of Vermont in 1930 and 1942.

== Early life and career ==
Park Hiram Pollard was born in Cavendish, Vermont on June 5, 1869. He attended the schools of Proctorsville, Vermont, Vermont Academy and Black River Academy. Pollard apprenticed as a pharmacist and became the co-owner and co-operator of Pollard Brother's Store in Cavendish. In addition to selling medicines, Pollard's offered a “compounding” pharmacy service, which made customized medications for humans and animals. As a general store, it carried a wide variety of products, including food, tobacco, shoes and boots, carpets, rope, petroleum products, and windows and window shades.

Active in politics as a Democrat, Pollard served in local offices, including town lister, town selectman, and trustee of the village of Proctorsville. During World War I, he served on the Windsor County draft exemption board and was appointed U.S. Explosives Inspector for Vermont. (Note: Explosives inspectors oversaw the storage and security of explosives by users including mines and construction projects in order to ensure they were not stolen or misused during wartime.)

== Statewide political career ==
Despite being a Democrat in an era when Republicans won all elections for statewide office, Pollard was appointed by Governor Allen M. Fletcher to a seat on the Vermont Public Service Commission from 1913 to 1915. Pollard became chairman of the Vermont Democratic Party in 1916. He was first elected to the Vermont House of Representatives in 1916, representing the town of Cavendish. In April 1917 Pollard was nominated to the Vermont Board of Control by Governor Horace F. Graham, but his nomination was blocked by the Vermont Senate. (Note: The Board of Control was empowered to investigate state spending and make cost savings recommendations to the legislature.) This blockage was denounced by some commentators as an act of petty partisanship, but other observers contended that the Senate's decision was motivated by remarks Pollard had made on the House floor.

Pollard was not re-elected in 1918, but was elected again in 1920. While in the state house he was noted for his ability to block legislation, due to his strong ties with rural representatives. Pollard's legislative focus was on what he deemed unnecessary spending, and he earned a reputation as a fiscal conservative.

Pollard was the Democratic nominee in the 1923 special election to fill the U.S. Senate seat that had been vacated by the death of William P. Dillingham. Due to Vermont's traditionally Republican lean, he was considered to have next to no chance of winning. Pollard attempted to define the race around the issue of Prohibition, taking a "wet" stance that advocated for amending the Volstead Act to be less restrictive, and attempting to appeal to supporters of wet Republican John W. Redmond, who had been defeated by "dry" candidate Porter H. Dale in the Republican primary. Pollard was defeated by Dale, 66%-33%.

Pollard endorsed John W. Davis for President in 1924. He was nominated by both the Democratic and Republican parties for re-election as state representative that year, but declined the nominations for unspecified personal reasons.

Pollard was the Democratic nominee for Governor in 1930, once again running as a wet. During the campaign, he favored the total repeal of the Eighteenth Amendment and the Volstead Act. He lost heavily to Lieutenant Governor Stanley C. Wilson. Pollard was again the Democratic nominee for Governor in 1942, losing to incumbent Governor William H. Wills, and stepped down as party chair that same year.

== Death ==
Pollard died in a Waterbury nursing home on December 26, 1955. He received Masonic funeral honors, and was buried at Hillcrest Cemetery in Proctorsville.

== Personal life ==
Pollard was the son of Don Carlos Pollard and Sarah (Moor) Pollard. He was a first cousin of Calvin Coolidge; Pollard's mother was the sister of Coolidge's mother Victoria Josephine Moor. Pollard married Edith Mary Johnson in 1894; they were the parents of a daughter, Minnie. Edith Pollard died in 1923, and in 1931 Pollard married Julia Rose (McNulty) Rollinson.
