= Pollard Block =

- U.S. National Register of Historic Places
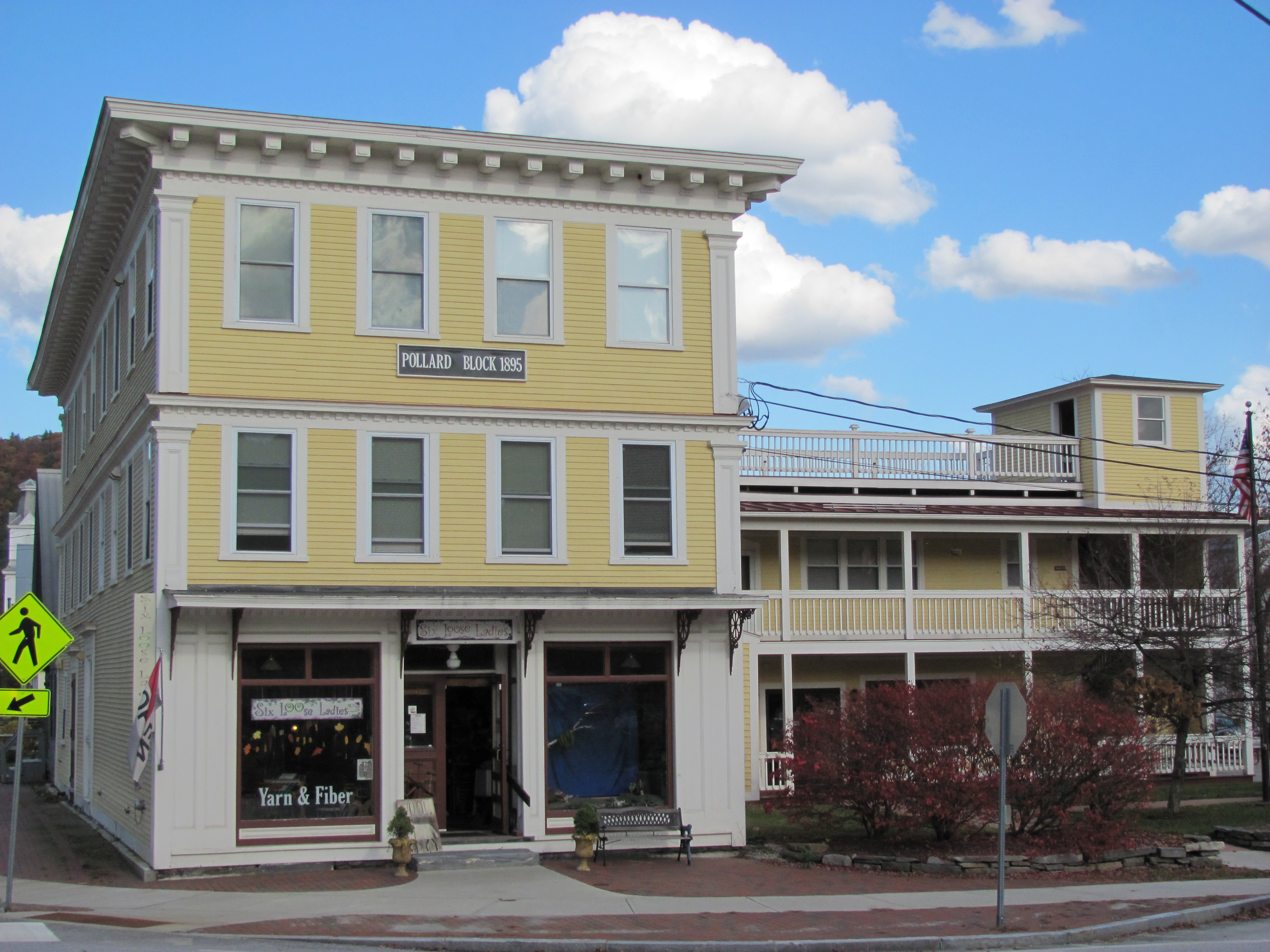

- Location within Vermont Location within the United States
- Location: 7 Depot St., Cavendish, Vermont
- Coordinates: 43°22′57″N 72°38′19″W
- Area: less than one acre
- Built: 1895; 131 years ago
- Architectural style: Italianate
- NRHP reference No.: 08000855
- Added to NRHP: August 28, 2008

The Pollard Block is a historic commercial building at 7 Depot Street in Cavendish, Vermont. Built in 1895, it is a fine local example of commercial Italianate architecture, and was home to the village general store for 70 years. It was listed on the National Register of Historic Places in 2008.

== Description and history ==
The Pollard Block stands at the center of the village of Proctorsville in western Cavendish, at the junction of Depot Street and Main Street (Vermont Route 131). It is a three-story wood-frame structure, with a flat roof, clapboarded exterior, and stone foundation. The main block has extensive Italianate styling, including a bracketed cornice, paneled corner pilasters, and course of dentil moulding above the second and third floors. The first-floor storefront is in its original configuration, with recessed entrance flanked by display windows, and sheltered by an awning with wrought iron brackets. A 1990s two-story ell extends to the south, set back from the main block, and a four-story mansarded tower rises at the northeast corner.

The block was built in 1895 to house the general store of brothers Don Pollard and Park Pollard, replacing an earlier Federal period brick structure that had previously housed the store. The interior of the first floor retains many of its original features and fixtures, and continues to see retail use. The upper floors have been adapted for residential use, and only the floors and some window trim have survived. Pollard's store was the largest in the village until its closure in 1964.

== See also ==
- National Register of Historic Places listings in Windsor County, Vermont
