= Charles S. Dana =

American politician (1862–1939)

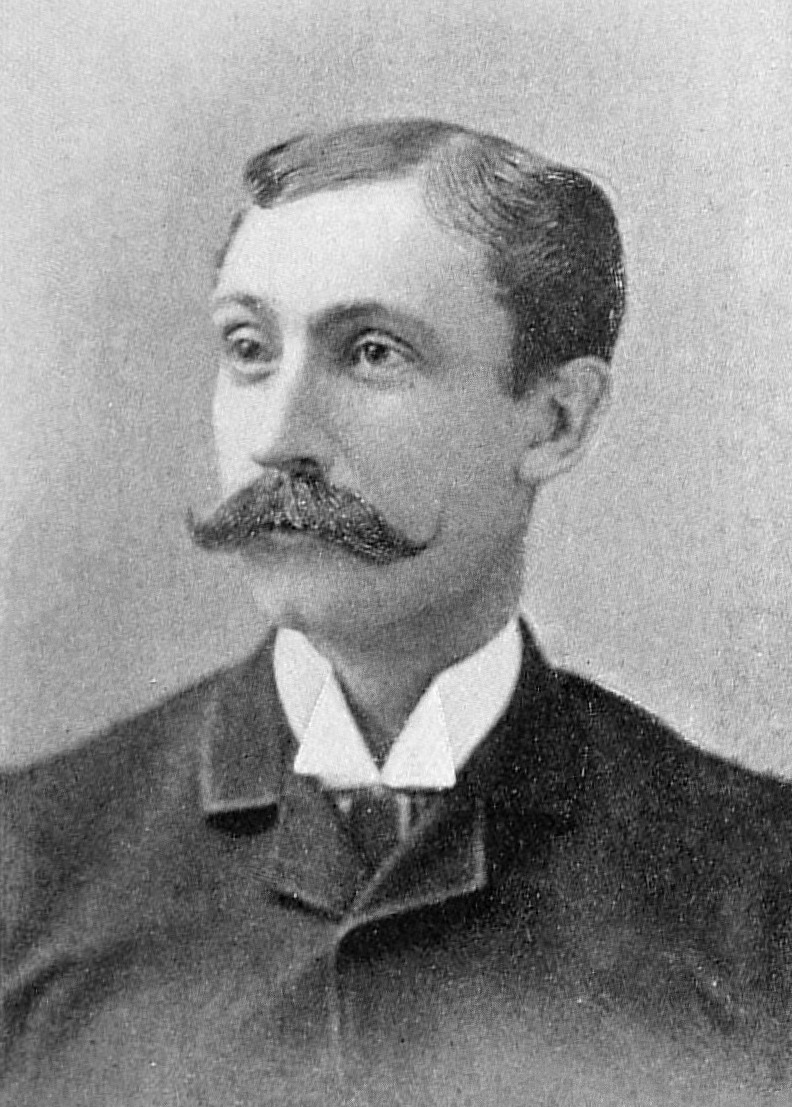

Speaker of the Vermont House of Representatives
- In office 1917–1921
- Preceded by: Stanley C. Wilson
- Succeeded by: Franklin S. Billings

Member of the Vermont House of Representatives
- In office 1917–1921
- Preceded by: Julius R. Cole
- Succeeded by: Asahel B. Hoffnagle
- Constituency: New Haven
- In office 1900–1902
- Preceded by: Frank L. Eastman
- Succeeded by: William H. Hunt
- Constituency: New Haven

Personal details
- Born: September 13, 1862 New Haven, Vermont, U.S.
- Died: December 29, 1939 (aged 77) Middlebury, Vermont, U.S.
- Resting place: Evergreen Cemetery, New Haven, Vermont, U.S.
- Party: Republican
- Spouse: Lucy Grace Jackman (m. 1890)
- Children: 3
- Relatives: Marvin Dana (brother)
- Profession: Journalist

Charles S. Dana (September 13, 1862 – December 29, 1939) was a Vermont farmer, newspaper correspondent and politician who served as Speaker of the Vermont House of Representatives.

== Biography ==
Charles Summers Dana was born in New Haven, Vermont on September 13, 1862. A Republican, Dana served in local offices including town meeting moderator, lister, school board member, select board member and town clerk, and as a member of his town and county Republican committees. In addition to filing stories on Vermont current events for several daily and weekly newspapers, in partnership with his mother Dana owned a large and successful farm in New Haven.

Dana worked as assistant doorkeeper and assistant secretary of the Vermont Senate in the 1880s and 1890s.

In 1900 Dana was elected to the Vermont House of Representatives and served one term. Dana was named chief clerk in the office of the Vermont Secretary of State in 1902.

Dana served as Addison County Assistant Judge from 1908 to 1912.

In 1917 Dana was again elected to the Vermont House. He was selected to serve as Speaker after Stanley C. Wilson resigned to accept a judgeship. Dana served as Speaker until 1921.

Dana died at Porter Hospital in Middlebury on December 29, 1939. He was buried in New Haven's Evergreen Cemetery.

== See also ==
- Marvin Dana, his brother

Political offices
Preceded by Stanley C. Wilson	Speaker of the Vermont House of Representatives; 1917–1921	Succeeded by Franklin S. Billings
