= Roswell M. Austin =

American politician

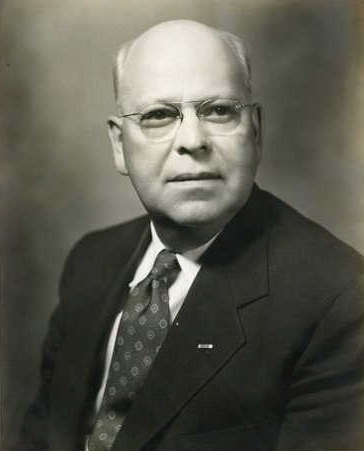
- Austin as a member of the Board of Contract Appeals, circa 1945

Speaker of the Vermont House of Representatives
- In office 1925–1927
- Preceded by: Orlando L. Martin
- Succeeded by: Loren R. Pierce

Member of the Vermont House of Representatives
- In office 1925–1927
- Preceded by: George N. Bliss
- Succeeded by: Patrick E. Sullivan
- Constituency: St. Albans City

Personal details
- Born: September 23, 1887 Highgate, Vermont, U.S.
- Died: February 1, 1966 (aged 78) New Bern, North Carolina
- Party: Republican
- Spouse: Katherine Mussey Sewall (m. 1911)
- Children: 3
- Relatives: Warren R. Austin (brother)
- Education: Yale College
- Occupation: Attorney

Military service
- Service: United States Army
- Years of service: 1942–1945
- Rank: Lieutenant Colonel
- Unit: Armed Services Board of Contract Appeals
- Wars: World War II
- Awards: Legion of Merit

Roswell Mears Austin (September 23, 1887 – February 1, 1966) was a Vermont politician and attorney who served as Speaker of the Vermont House of Representatives.

== Early life ==
Roswell Mears Austin was born in Highgate, Vermont on September 23, 1887, a son of attorney Chauncey Goodrich Austin and Anne (Robinson) Austin. Austin graduated from St. Albans High School in 1905 and Phillips Andover Academy in 1906. He attended Yale College from 1906 to 1910, and graduated with a Bachelor of Arts degree. He then studied law with his father, was admitted to the bar, and began to practice with his father in St. Albans City.

== Early career ==
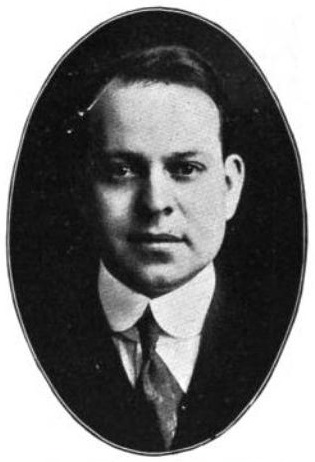
Austin as First Assistant Clerk of the Vermont House, 1919

A Republican, Austin was Assistant Clerk of the Vermont House of Representatives from 1915 to 1920 and Clerk from 1921 to 1925.

In 1924 Austin was elected to represent St. Albans City in the Vermont House of Representatives. He served one term, 1925 to 1927, and was Speaker of the House.

Austin later became involved in several businesses, and was a longtime executive of the American Granite Association.

== Later career ==
In 1942, Austin entered the United States Army as a major and was assigned to the Armed Services Board of Contract Appeals. He served until 1945 and was promoted to lieutenant colonel during the war and continued to serve on the board throughout the 1940s and 1950s, including service as the board's president. Austin received the Legion of Merit in recognition of his contract appeals board work during World War II.

As a result of contract appeals board service, Austin was involved in the investigation of President Dwight Eisenhower's Chief of Staff, Sherman Adams when Adams was accused of using his influence on behalf of favored contractors in exchange for gifts.

Austin died in New Bern, North Carolina on February 1, 1966. He was cremated in Durham, North Carolina.

== Family ==
In 1911, Austin married Katherine Mussey Sewall in Worcester, Massachusetts. She died in 1948, and they were the parents of three children.

Roswell Auston was the brother of United States Senator Warren R. Austin.

Political offices
| Preceded by Orlando L. Martin | Speaker of the Vermont House of Representatives; 1925–1927 | Succeeded by Loren R. Pierce |
