= 1923 San Francisco mayoral election =

- November 6, 1923
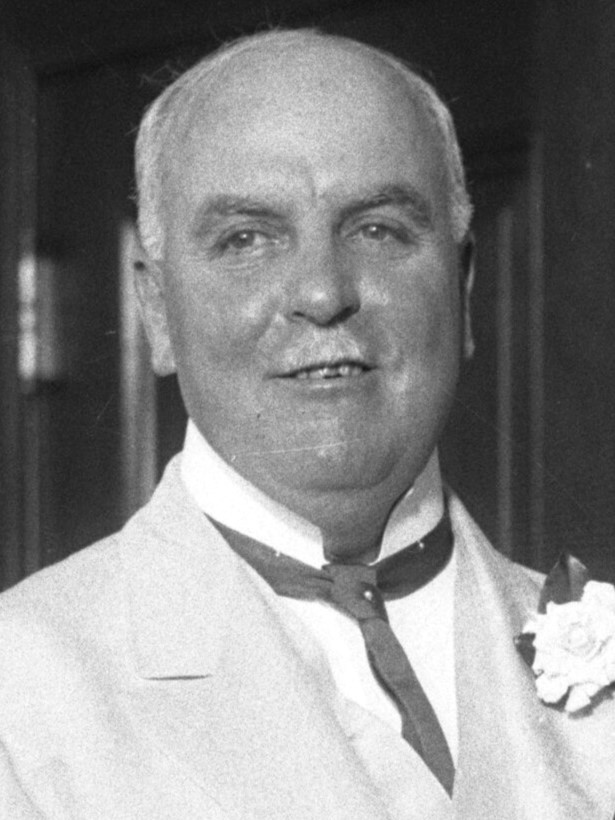

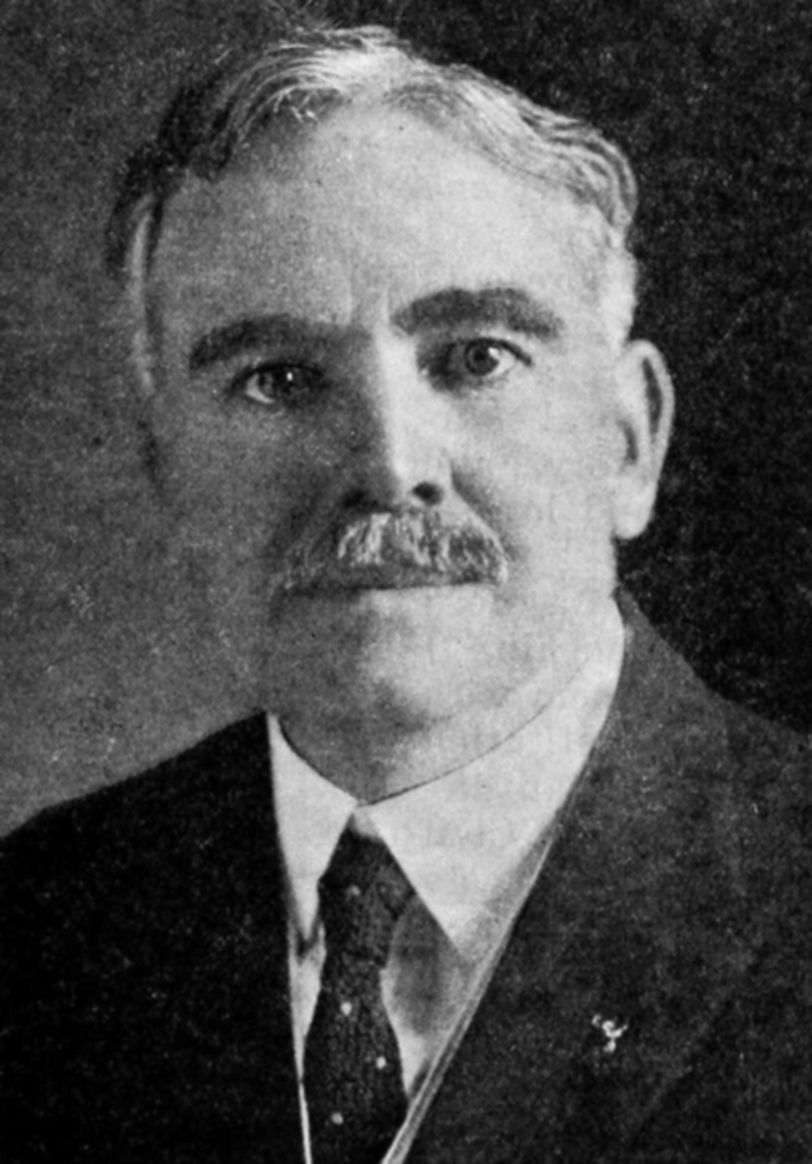
| Candidate | James Rolph Jr. | James B. McSheehy |
| Party | Republican | Union Labor |
| Alliance | Democratic |
| Popular vote | 71,703 | 43,673 |
| Percentage | 62.15% | 37.85% |
Mayor before election
James Rolph Jr.
Republican
Elected Mayor
James Rolph Jr.
Republican

The 1923 San Francisco mayoral election was held on November 6, 1923. Incumbent James Rolph Jr. was re-elected with 62% of the vote.

== Results ==
1923 San Francisco mayoral election
| Party | Candidate | Votes | % |
|---|---|---|---|
| Republican | James Rolph Jr. | 71,703 | 62.15% |
| Union Labor | James B. McSheehy | 43,673 | 37.85% |
| Total votes | | 115,376 | 100.00 |
| Republican hold | | | |
