= 1923 Hong Kong sanitary board election =

- 12 April 1923
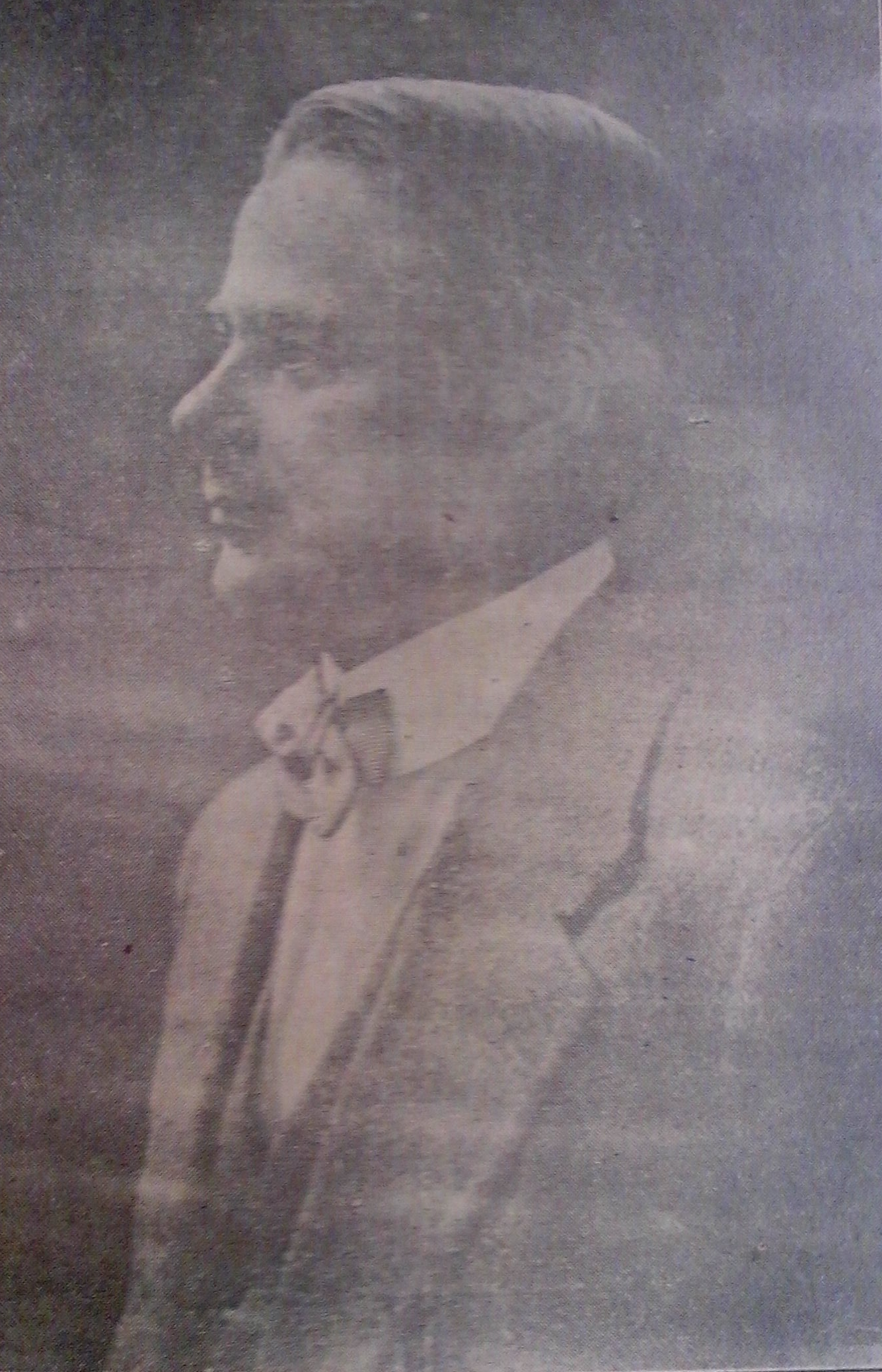
Nominee	C. G. Alabaster
Party	CRA
Popular vote	Uncontested
Member before election
C. G. Alabaster
Elected Member
C. G. Alabaster

The 1923 Hong Kong Sanitary Board election was supposed to be held on 12 April 1923 for an elected seat in the Sanitary Board of Hong Kong.

The election was held for two of the elected seats in the board due to the expiry of term of C. G. Alabaster. Alabaster returned to the Board uncontested.
