= 1923 Philadelphia mayoral election =

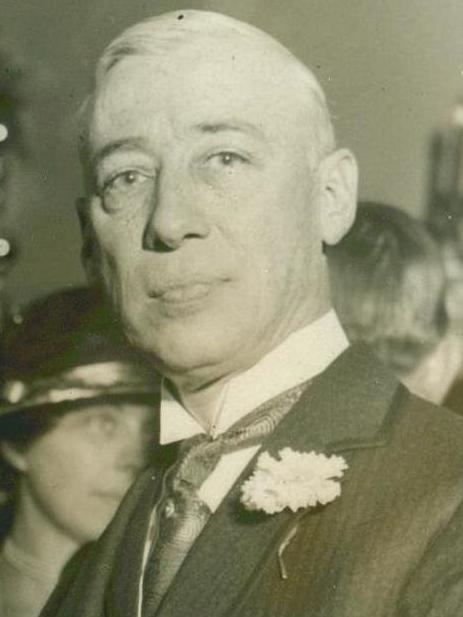

Nominee	W. Freeland Kendrick	A. Raymond Raff
Party	Republican	Democratic
Popular vote	286,398	37,239
Percentage	88.49%	11.51%
Mayor before election
J. Hampton Moore
Republican
Elected mayor
W. Freeland Kendrick
Republican

The 1923 Philadelphia mayoral election saw the election of W. Freeland Kendrick.

== Results ==
1923 Philadelphia mayoral election (general election)
Party	Candidate	Votes	%
Republican	W. Freeland Kendrick	286,398	88.49%
Democratic	A. Raymond Raff	37,239	11.51%
Turnout		323,637	
