= 1923 Bolivian legislative election =

Parliamentary elections were held in Bolivia in May 1923 to elect half the seats of the Chamber Deputies and one-third of the Senate.

== Results ==
Party	Votes	%	Seats					
Party	Votes	%	Chamber			Senate		
Party	Votes	%	Elected	Total	+/–	Elected	Total	+/–
Republican Party			35	70	+10	5	16	0
Total			35	70	+7	5	16	0
Source: Cáceres

=== Elected members ===
The new senators were:

- José Cronenbold, PR (Santa Cruz)
- Felipe Guzmán, PR (La Paz)
- Hernando Siles, PR (Chuquisaca)
- Manuel Mogro Moreno, PR (Tarija)
- José Paravicini, PR (Potosí)
