= 1923 United States Senate special election in Vermont =

United States Senate special election in Vermont, 1923
- November 6, 1923
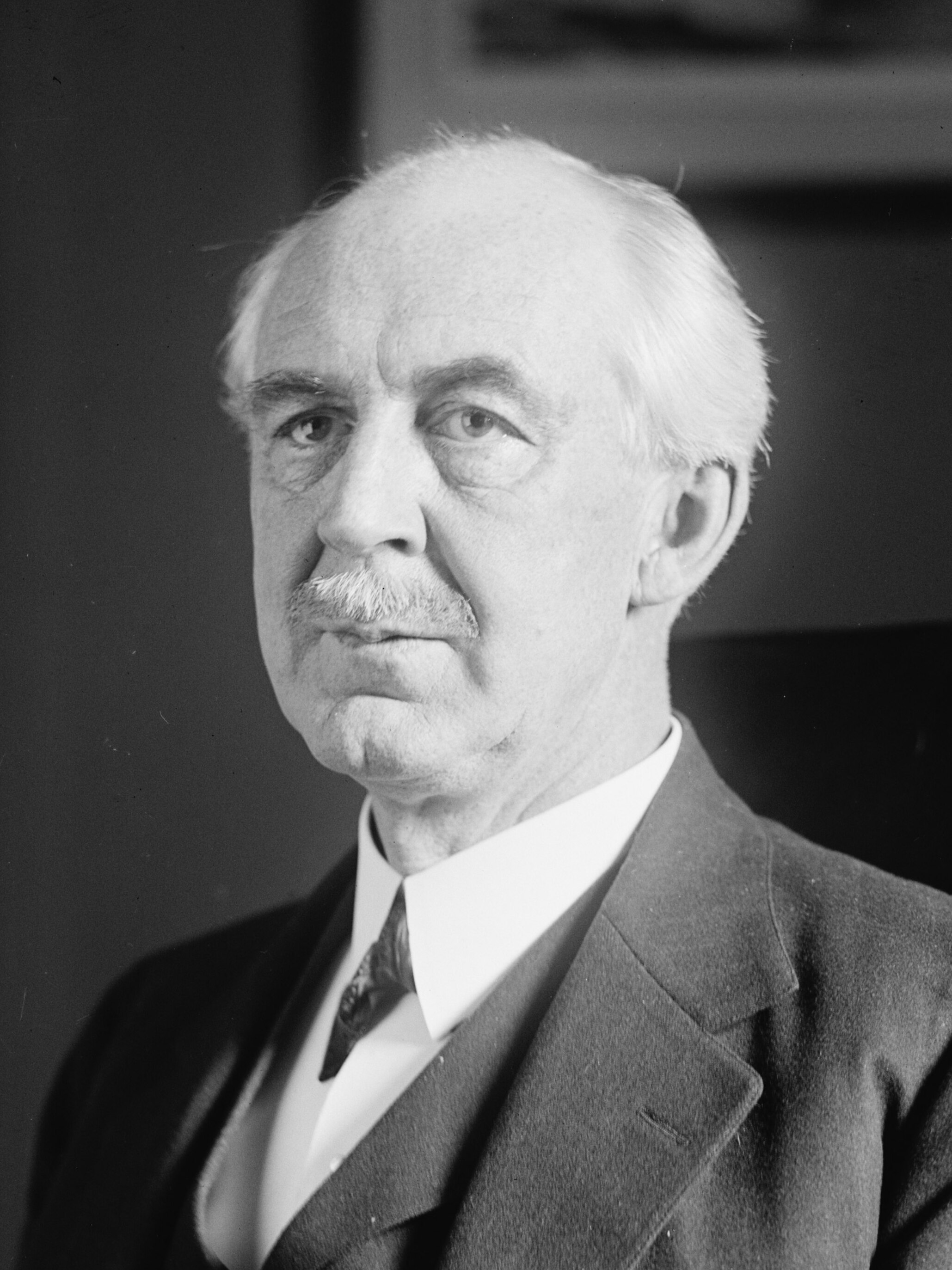

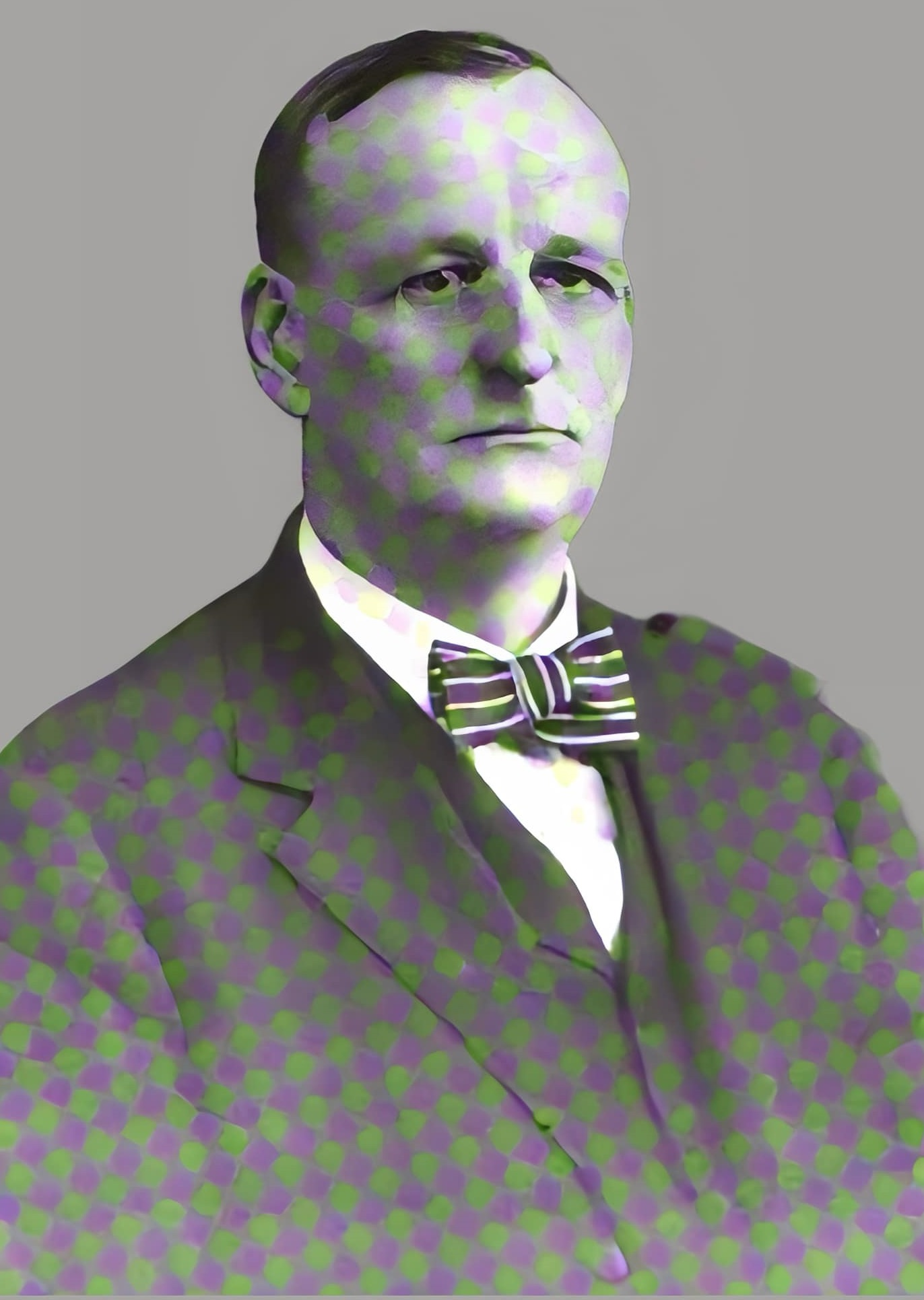
Nominee	Porter H. Dale	Park H. Pollard
Party	Republican	Democratic
Popular vote	30,388	15,580
Percentage	65.65%	33.66%
- Dale: 40–50% 50–60% 60–70% 70–80% 80–90% >90% Pollard: 50–60% 60–70% 70–80% Tie: 40–50% 50%
U.S. senator before election
William P. Dillingham
Republican
Elected U.S. Senator
Porter H. Dale
Republican

The 1923 United States Senate special election in Vermont took place on November 6, 1923. Republican Porter H. Dale was elected to the United States Senate to serve the remainder of the deceased William P. Dillingham's term, defeating Democratic candidate Park H. Pollard.

== Republican primary ==
=== Results ===
Republican primary results
Party	Candidate	Votes	%	±%
Republican	Porter H. Dale	26,654	53.7%	
Republican	John W. Redmond	13,727	27.6%	
Republican	Stanley C. Wilson	9,250	18.6%	
Republican	Other	28	0.1%	
Total votes		49,659	100.0%	

== Democratic primary ==
=== Results ===
Democratic primary results
Party	Candidate	Votes	%	±%
Democratic	Park H. Pollard	1,428	99.0%	
Democratic	Other	15	1.0%	
Total votes		1,443	100.0%	

== General election ==
=== Candidates ===
- Porter H. Dale (Republican), U.S. Representative from VT-02
- Marshall J. Hapgood (Conservation), landowner and former state representative
- Park H. Pollard (Democratic), state representative and Chairman of the Vermont Democratic Party

=== Endorsements ===
Porter Dale (R)

Organizations

- Anti-Saloon League

=== Results ===
United States Senate special election in Vermont, 1923
Party	Candidate	Votes	%	±%
Republican	Porter H. Dale	30,388	65.65%	−12.41%
Democratic	Park H. Pollard	15,580	33.66%	+11.72%
Conservation	Marshall J. Hapgood	248	0.54%	N/A
Total	Other	70	0.15%	N/A
Total votes		46,286	100.00%	

== See also ==
- 1923 United States Senate elections
