= 1923 Swiss referendums =

Four referendums were held in Switzerland during 1923. The first two were held on 18 February on protective custody and a federal resolution on relations with France over the former free trade area of Haute-Savoie. The third was held on 15 April on a popular initiative "for the ensuring of people's rights in questions regarding tariffs", whilst the fourth was held on 3 June on amending articles 31 and 32bis of the constitution regarding alcohol. All four were rejected by voters.

== Background ==
The referendums on protective custody and tariffs were both popular initiatives, which required a double majority; a majority of the popular vote and a majority of the cantons. The decision of each canton was based on the vote in that canton. Full cantons counted as one vote, whilst half cantons counted as half. The referendum on relations with France was a "facultative referendum", which required only a simple majority of voters in favour, whilst the referendum on amending the constitution was a mandatory referendum, which also required a double majority.

== Results ==
=== Protective custody ===
Choice	Popular vote		Cantons		
Choice	Votes	%	Full	Half	Total
For	55,145	11.0	0	0	0
Against	445,606	89.0	19	6	22
Blank votes	25,109	–	–	–	–
Invalid votes	1,016	–	–	–	–
Total	526,876	100	19	6	22
Registered voters/turnout	989,661	53.2	–	–	–
Source: Nohlen & Stöver

=== Relations with France ===
Choice	Votes	%
For	93,982	18.5
Against	414,305	81.5
Blank votes	19,515	–
Invalid votes	1,024	–
Total	528,736	100
Registered voters/turnout	989,661	53.4
Source: Nohlen & Stöver

=== Tariffs ===
Choice	Popular vote		Cantons		
Choice	Votes	%	Full	Half	Total
For	171,020	26.8	0	1	0.5
Against	467,876	73.2	19	5	21.5
Blank votes	10,813	–	–	–	–
Invalid votes	1,450	–	–	–	–
Total	651,159	100	19	6	22
Registered voters/turnout	990,202	65.8	–	–	–
Source: Nohlen & Stöver

=== Constitutional amendments ===
Choice	Popular vote		Cantons		
Choice	Votes	%	Full	Half	Total
For	262,688	42.2	9	2	10
Against	360,397	57.8	10	4	12
Blank votes	11,931	–	–	–	–
Invalid votes	1,575	–	–	–	–
Total	636,591	100	19	6	22
Registered voters/turnout	985,774	64.6	–	–	–
Source: Nohlen & Stöver
