= Stanley C. Wilson =

American politician

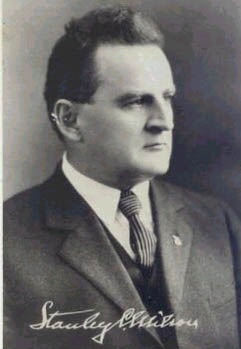

62nd Governor of Vermont
- In office January 8, 1931 – January 10, 1935
- Lieutenant: Benjamin Williams; Charles Manley Smith
- Preceded by: John E. Weeks
- Succeeded by: Charles Manley Smith

57th Lieutenant Governor of Vermont
- In office January 9, 1929 – January 7, 1931
- Governor: John E. Weeks
- Preceded by: Hollister Jackson
- Succeeded by: Benjamin Williams

Member of the Vermont Senate
- In office January 5, 1927 – January 8, 1929
- Preceded by: Frederick H. Bickford
- Succeeded by: Alfred C. Jackman
- Constituency: Orange County

President of the Vermont Bar Association
- In office 1924–1925
- Preceded by: Warren Austin
- Succeeded by: J. Rolf Searles

Judge of the Vermont Superior Court
- In office 1917–1923
- Preceded by: Willard W. Miles
- Succeeded by: Warner A. Graham

Speaker of the Vermont House of Representatives
- In office 1917
- Preceded by: John E. Weeks
- Succeeded by: Charles S. Dana

Member of the Vermont House of Representatives from Chelsea
- In office 1925–1927
- Preceded by: Oliver E. Burgess
- Succeeded by: Andrew L. Sprague
- In office 1915–1917
- Preceded by: Benjamin H. Adams
- Succeeded by: Frederick C. Waldo

Chairman of the Vermont Republican Party
- In office 1914–1917
- Preceded by: Nelson D. Phelps
- Succeeded by: J. Rolfe Searles

State's Attorney of Orange County, Vermont
- In office 1908–1912
- Preceded by: March M. Wilson
- Succeeded by: Frank S. Williams

Personal details
- Born: Stanley Calef Wilson; September 10, 1879 Orange, Vermont, US
- Died: October 5, 1967 (aged 88) Chelsea, Vermont, US
- Resting place: Highland Cemetery, Chelsea, Vermont
- Party: Republican
- Spouse: Grace Goodwin Bacon Wilson (1879–1968)
- Education: Tufts University (BA)
- Profession: Lawyer

Stanley Calef Wilson (September 10, 1879 – October 5, 1967) was an American politician, attorney, and businessman from Vermont. He served as the 57th lieutenant governor of Vermont from 1929 to 1931 and the 62nd governor of Vermont from 1931 to 1935.

A native of Orange, Vermont, Wilson graduated from Tufts University, studied law, attained admission to the bar, and became an attorney in Chelsea. He served in local offices and was State's Attorney of Orange County for four years. He was Chairman of the Vermont Republican Party from 1914 to 1917. From 1915 to 1917, Wilson served in the Vermont House of Representatives, and he was Speaker of the House in 1917. From 1917 to 1923, Wilson was a judge on the Vermont Superior Court. He was president of the Vermont Bar Association from 1924 to 1925, and he served in the Vermont House again from 1925 to 1927. From 1927 to 1929, Wilson served in the Vermont Senate. He was Lieutenant Governor of Vermont from 1929 to 1931.

In 1930, Wilson was elected Governor of Vermont. He was re-elected in 1932 and served from 1931 to 1935. After leaving office, he resumed practicing law and was involved in several business ventures. He died in Chelsea in 1967 and was buried at Highland Cemetery in Chelsea.

== Early life ==
Stanley C. Wilson was born in Orange, Vermont, on September 10, 1879, the son of William W. Wilson (1835–1912) and Lydia (Browning) Wilson (1841–1923). He graduated from Goddard Seminary in Barre in 1896, and then taught school for a year to save enough to begin attending college. In 1897, he became a student at Tufts University, from which he received his Bachelor of Arts degree in 1901.

After college, Wilson was a reporter for the Montpelier Daily Journal and worked as Deputy Clerk of the Washington County Court and Reporter for the Vermont House of Representatives. In addition, he served in the National Guard for three years as a private in Company H, 1st Vermont Infantry Regiment. Wilson also studied law, first with the firm of William P. Dillingham and Fred A. Howland, and later with Zed S. Stanton. He was admitted to the bar in 1904, and went into partnership with Benjamin Gates of Montpelier. Wilson later moved to Chelsea to become the partner of Joseph K. Darling, and took over the practice after Darling died in 1910. He later practiced with other partners, and for several years maintained offices in Chelsea, White River Junction, and Montpelier.

== Start of political career ==
A Republican, Wilson served in local offices including town meeting moderator and selectman. He was elected State's Attorney of Orange County in 1908, and was reelected in 1910. From 1914 to 1917 he was chairman of the Vermont Republican Party.

== Vermont House of Representatives ==
He served in the Vermont House of Representatives from 1915 to 1917 and was chairman of the Ways and Means Committee. In 1917 he served as Speaker following the resignation of John E. Weeks, who was appointed Director of State Institutions. He resigned from the House upon being appointed to the bench.

== Superior Court Judge ==
From 1917 to 1923 Wilson served as Judge of the Vermont Superior Court, filling a vacancy created after Chief Judge Willard W. Miles was appointed to the Vermont Supreme Court, and the other superior court judges advanced by seniority. He resigned from the bench to campaign for the Republican nomination for United States Senator following the death of William P. Dillingham, but lost to Porter H. Dale and John W. Redmond, with Dale going on to win the general election.

== Return to the Vermont House ==
From 1924 to 1925, Wilson was president of the Vermont Bar Association. In 1925, he returned to the Vermont House, holding office until 1927. During this term, Wilson served as chairman of the House Appropriations Committee.

== Vermont State Senate ==
Wilson served in the Vermont Senate from 1927 to 1929. He was chairman of the Judiciary Committee, which considered appointments to Vermont's state courts as well as review of and updates to Vermont's statutes. While serving in the senate, Wilson also carried out a gubernatorial appointment as chairman of a commission that developed plans for construction of a bridge over Lake Champlain. In addition, Wilson carried out with Hale K. Darling an appointment as special counsel to defend the state's newly-enacted intangibles tax in court.

== Lieutenant governor ==
In 1928 Wilson was elected Lieutenant Governor, and he served from 1929 to 1931. During his tenure as presiding officer, the state senate took the lead on legislation reorganizing the Central Vermont Railway, providing a loan to the West River Railway so that it could continue operations, modernizing the state banking system, appointing a commission to reduce and standardize electric rates, regulating billboards, and increasing the governor's salary.

== Governor ==
In 1930 he won election as Governor and served two terms, 1931 to 1935. Wilson's two terms were marked by efforts to recover from the Flood of 1927, and to deal with the effects of the Great Depression. He was also a delegate to the 1932 Republican National Convention.

In attaining the governorship, Wilson adhered to the provision of the Republican Party's "Mountain Rule," which required candidates to alternate between the east and west sides of the Green Mountains. However Wilson also ran for a second term, as had his predecessor John E. Weeks. A second term violated the Mountain Rule provision that limited governors to two years in office. Weeks argued that there needed to be continuity in office so that the state could continue its efforts to recover from the 1927 flood. Wilson argued that he needed to both continue flood recovery efforts and to combat the negative economic effects of the Great Depression, and his reelection served to modify the Mountain Rule. Beginning with Weeks and Wilson, two terms (four years) in office became more or less standard. Along with changes including the direct election of United States Senators and party primary elections, Weeks's and Wilson's willingness to go against tradition were seen as further eroding the Mountain Rule, one of the primary tools for maintaining discipline within the ranks of the Republican Party.

Wilson stated in later interviews that he regarded the passage of the state income tax as his greatest accomplishment as governor because it added stability to the state's economy. The income tax was preferred to other means of raising revenue because personal income was easier for the state to locate than other sources. As a result of the income tax's success, the state was able to eliminate the state highway tax, education property tax, intangibles tax, and general statewide property tax.

== Post gubernatorial career ==
After leaving the governor's office Wilson practiced law in Chelsea with F. Ray Keyser Sr., Deane C. Davis and J. Ward Carver. Their firm has been referred to by historians as Vermont's best ever collection of legal talent, in that it included two Governors (Wilson and Davis), one state Attorney General (Carver), and one state Supreme Court Justice (Keyser). After this firm dissolved, Wilson continued to practice law in Chelsea.

== Business career ==
Wilson owned and operated a working dairy farm. He was also active in numerous business ventures throughout his career, and a partial list includes: member of the board of directors of the National Bank of Orange County and Hartford Savings Bank and Trust Company; vice president and director of the Brocklebank Granite Company and Brocklebank Manufacturing Company; board member of the Green Mountain Mutual Fire Insurance Company, the Vermont Flood Credit Corporation, and the Orange County Creamery Company. Wilson was also president of the Gates Realty Company. In addition, he was a partner in the reorganization of the Vermont Copper Company, and served as its Secretary and President.

== Civic activism ==
Wilson was an officer or director of numerous civic and professional organizations, including member of the board of directors of the New England Council, and director of the Vermont Dairymen's Association, Vermont Maple Sugar Maker's Association, Vermont Forestry Association, and Orange County Farm Bureau. He was also a member of the executive committee for the Owl Council, Boy Scouts of America. In addition, Wilson was active in Modern Woodmen of America and the Chelsea Grange organization.

Long active in Freemasonry, Wilson's membership included: Chelsea's George Washington Lodge, Free and Accepted Masons; Whitney Chapter of Royal Arch Masons (Randolph); Mt. Zion Commandery, Knights Templar (Montpelier); and Mt. Sinai Temple, Shriners International (Montpelier).

In 1952, Wilson was the driving force behind the establishment of a community hospital, the Chelsea Health Center, the first community-owned nonprofit health center in the nation.

Wilson was also interested in higher education, and was an officer of the Tufts College Alumni Association. He served for over 50 years on the Norwich University Board of Trustees, including 15 years as Chairman. In addition, he was an executive committee member for the Goddard Seminary board of directors.

== Death and burial ==
Wilson died in Chelsea on October 5, 1967. He was buried at Highland Cemetery in Chelsea.

== Family ==
In 1909, Wilson married Grace Goodwin Bacon Wilson (1879–1968). They were married until his death and had no children.

== Honors ==
Norwich University's Wilson Hall is named in his honor. In addition, Wilson received the honorary degree of LL.D. from Norwich University (1927), Tufts University (1931), and the University of Vermont (1932).

== Sources ==
Party political offices
Preceded by Hollister Jackson	Republican nominee for Lieutenant Governor of Vermont; 1928	Succeeded by Charles Manley Smith
Preceded by John E. Weeks	Republican nominee for Governor of Vermont; 1930, 1932	Succeeded by Benjamin Williams
Political offices
Preceded by John E. Weeks	Speaker of the Vermont House of Representatives; 1917–1917	Succeeded by Charles S. Dana
Preceded by Hollister Jackson	Lieutenant Governor of Vermont; 1929–1931	Succeeded by Benjamin Williams
Preceded by John E. Weeks	Governor of Vermont; 1931–1935	Succeeded by Charles M. Smith
