= Lawrence C. Jones =

American attorney and politician

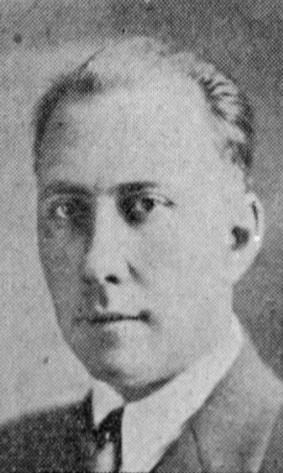
- Barre Daily Times, November 7, 1934

Vermont Secretary of Military and Civil Affairs
- In office 1946–1947
- Governor: Mortimer R. Proctor
- Preceded by: Oscar L. Shepard
- Succeeded by: Harold C. Sylvester

President of the National Association of Attorneys General
- In office 1939–1940
- Preceded by: Gaston Louis Noel Porterie
- Succeeded by: Abram Penn Staples

9th Vermont Attorney General
- In office 1931–1941
- Governor: Stanley C. Wilson; Charles Manley Smith; George Aiken
- Preceded by: J. Ward Carver
- Succeeded by: Alban J. Parker

State's Attorney of Rutland County, Vermont
- In office 1925–1931
- Preceded by: Charles E. Novak
- Succeeded by: Jack A. Crowley

Personal details
- Born: August 10, 1893 Rutland, Vermont, US
- Died: July 9, 1972 (aged 79) Rutland, Vermont, US
- Resting place: Evergreen Cemetery, Rutland, Vermont, US
- Party: Republican
- Spouse(s): Helen Russell (m. 1917–1920, her death); Rena Clare Fay (m. 1922–1936, div.); Clara Manville (Hitchcock) Fitzpatrick (m. 1937–1972, his death)
- Education: Worcester Polytechnic Institute (Attended)
- Profession: Attorney

Lawrence C. Jones (August 10, 1893 – July 9, 1972) was a Vermont attorney and politician who served for 10 years as Vermont Attorney General.

== Biography ==
Lawrence Clark Jones was born in Rutland, Vermont on August 10, 1893, the son of Joseph C. and Alice L. Jones. He graduated from Rutland High School and attended Worcester Polytechnic Institute from 1912 to 1915.

Jones studied law with his brother George and his father at the Rutland firm of Jones & Jones, and was admitted to the bar in 1918. Jones practiced as a partner in Jones & Jones, and also became involved in politics as a Republican. In 1924 he was elected state’s attorney of Rutland County; he was reelected twice, and served from 1925 to 1931.

In 1930, Jones was the successful Republican nominee for Vermont Attorney General. He was reelected four times, and served from 1931 to 1941. From 1939 to 1940 he was president of the National Association of Attorneys General.

In 1942, Jones was appointed chief attorney for the federal Office of Price Administration in Vermont. In 1945, Jones was appointed Secretary of Civil and Military Affairs (chief assistant) to Governor Mortimer R. Proctor.

Jones died in Rutland on July 9, 1972. He was buried at Evergreen Cemetery in Rutland.

== Family ==
In 1917, Jones married Helen Russell, who died in 1920. In 1922, he married Rena Clare Fay; they divorced in 1936. In 1937, he married Clara Manville (Hitchcock) Fitzpatrick. He was the stepfather of her daughter Joanne and son John.

Party political offices
Preceded by J. Ward Carver	Republican nominee for Vermont Attorney General; 1930, 1932, 1934, 1936, 1938	Succeeded by Alban J. Parker
Political offices
Preceded by J. Ward Carver	Vermont Attorney General; 1931–1941	Succeeded by Alban J. Parker
