= Attorney General Parker =

Attorney General Parker may refer to:

- Alban J. Parker (1893–1971), Attorney General of Vermont
- Clifton G. Parker (1906–1988), Attorney General of Vermont
- David Parker (New Zealand politician) (born 1960), Attorney-General of New Zealand
- George P. Parker (1885–1937), Attorney General of Utah
- Herbert Parker (Massachusetts politician) (1856–1939), Attorney General of Massachusetts
- Jay S. Parker (1895–1969), Attorney General of Kansas
- Joel Parker (politician) (1816–1888), Attorney General of New Jersey
- Robert Parker (judge) (1796–1865), Attorney General of New Brunswick

== See also ==
- General Parker (disambiguation)
