= 1944 Vermont gubernatorial election =

- November 7, 1944
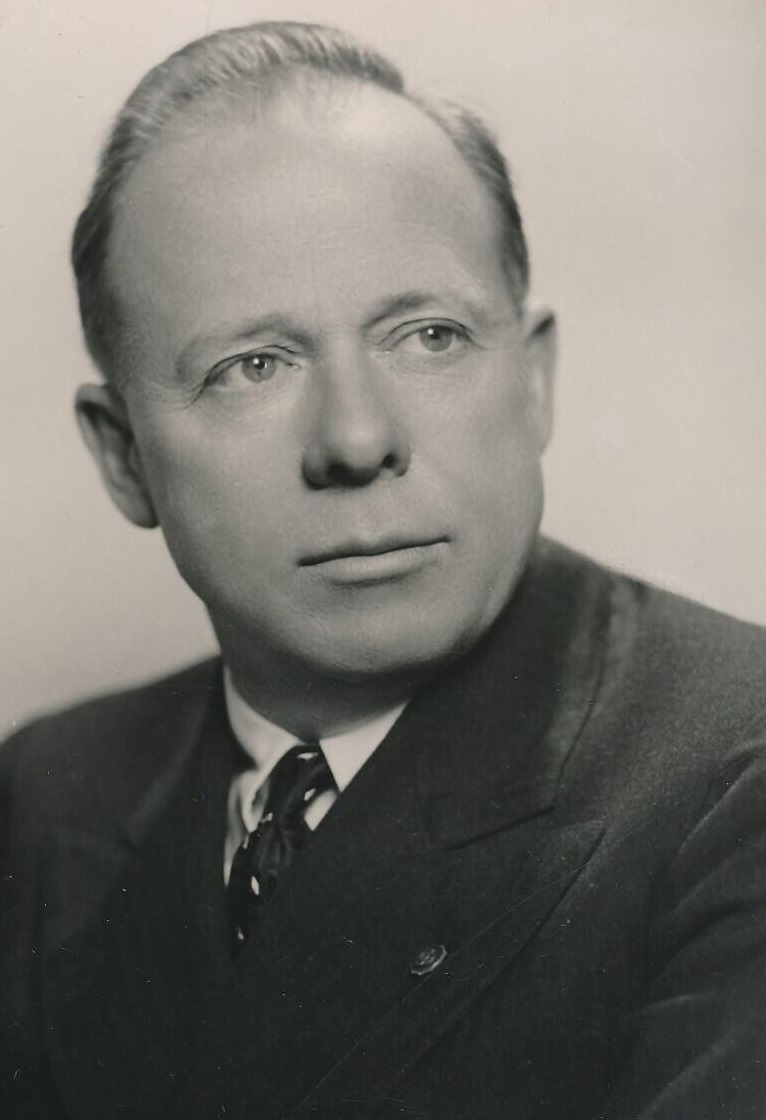

Nominee	Mortimer R. Proctor	Ernest H. Bailey
Party	Republican	Democratic
Popular vote	78,907	40,835
Percentage	65.90%	34.10%
- Proctor: 50–60% 60–70% 70–80% 80–90% 90-100% Bailey: 50–60% 60–70% 70–80% 80–90% No Vote/Data
Governor before election
William H. Wills
Republican
Elected Governor
Mortimer R. Proctor
Republican

The 1944 Vermont gubernatorial election took place on November 7, 1944. Incumbent Republican William H. Wills did not run for re-election to a third term as Governor of Vermont. Republican candidate Mortimer R. Proctor defeated Democratic candidate Ernest H. Bailey to succeed him.

== Republican primary ==
=== Results ===
Republican primary results
Party	Candidate	Votes	%	±%
Republican	Mortimer R. Proctor	22,654	63.0	
Republican	W. Arthur Simpson	13,327	37.0	
Total votes		35,981	100.0	

== Democratic primary ==
=== Results ===
Democratic primary results
Party	Candidate	Votes	%	±%
Democratic	Ernest H. Bailey	2,170	98.3	
Democratic	Other	38	1.7	
Total votes		2,208	100.0	

== General election ==
=== Candidates ===
- Mortimer R. Proctor, Lieutenant Governor of Vermont
- Ernest H. Bailey

=== Results ===
1944 Vermont gubernatorial election
Party	Candidate	Votes	%	±%
Republican	Mortimer R. Proctor	78,907	65.90	
Democratic	Ernest H. Bailey	40,835	34.10	
N/A	Other	5	0.00	
Total votes		119,747	100.0	
