= F. Elliott Barber Jr. =

American attorney and politician

F. Elliott Barber
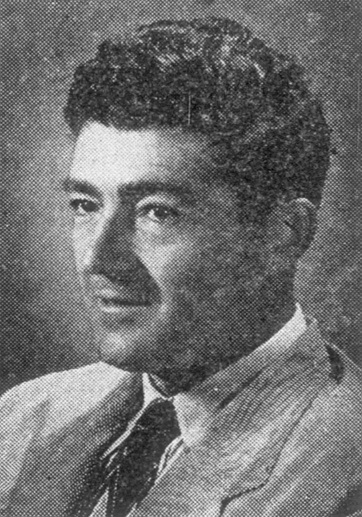
- From the September 8, 1952 issue of The Brattleboro Reformer

Vermont Attorney General
- In office 1952–1955
- Governor: Lee E. Emerson
- Preceded by: Clifton G. Parker
- Succeeded by: Robert Stafford

Member of the Vermont House of Representatives from Brattleboro
- In office 1951–1952
- Preceded by: Michael Broutsas
- Succeeded by: Robert T. Gannett

Member of the Vermont Senate from Windham County
- In office 1947–1949 Serving with Arthur O. Howe
- Preceded by: Frank E. Barber, Donald R. Huntington
- Succeeded by: Hugh Agnew, Arthur O. Howe

Personal details
- Born: June 8, 1912 Brattleboro, Vermont, U.S.
- Died: January 14, 1992 (aged 79) Brattleboro, Vermont, U.S.
- Resting place: Morningside Cemetery, Brattleboro, Vermont, U.S.
- Party: Republican
- Spouse(s): Jeanne Freund; Frances Fairbrother
- Children: 4
- Relatives: Herbert G. Barber (uncle)
- Education: Norwich University; Harvard Law School
- Profession: Attorney

Military service
- Service: United States Army
- Years of service: 1944–1945
- Rank: Captain
- Unit: Headquarters, Chinese Combat Command
- Wars: World War II

Frank Elliott Barber Jr. (June 8, 1912 – January 14, 1992) was a Vermont attorney and politician who served as Vermont Attorney General from 1953 to 1955.

== Biography ==
F. Elliott Barber was born in Brattleboro, Vermont on June 8, 1912. He was the son of attorney F. Elliott Barber Sr., and the nephew of Herbert G. Barber, who also served as Vermont Attorney General. He graduated from Brattleboro High School in 1930, Norwich University in 1934, and Harvard Law School in 1937. He was admitted to the bar in 1937, and practiced with his father in the Brattleboro firm of Barber & Barber.

Barber became active in Republican politics; from 1941 to 1943, he served as Brattleboro’s town counsel. In 1944, he was a delegate to the Republican National Convention. During his career, he also held other local offices, including justice of the peace and town meeting moderator.

He joined the United States Army for World War II, and attained the rank of captain at Headquarters, Chinese Combat Command, a unit commanded by Robert B. McClure, which operated in the China Burma India Theater.

In 1946 he won election to the Vermont State Senate, and he served from 1947 to 1949. In 1947, Barber was appointed judge of Brattleboro’s municipal court, and he served until 1949. In 1950, he won election to the Vermont House of Representatives, and he served one term, 1951 to 1953.

In 1952, Barber won the Republican nomination for Vermont Attorney General. He won the general election for the term starting in January 1953. Attorney General Clifton G. Parker resigned in December, and Governor Lee E. Emerson appointed Barber to fill the vacancy effective December 31. Barber served from December 31, 1952 to January 1955. As his deputy, Barber appointed Robert Stafford, who succeeded him as Attorney General.

In 1954, Barber was an unsuccessful candidate for the Republican nomination for Lieutenant Governor of Vermont; the nomination was won by Consuelo N. Bailey, who defeated Barber and Harold J. Arthur, and went on to win the general election.

In 1959, Stafford, now serving as governor, appointed Barber to the Vermont Liquor Control Board. He served until resigning in 1963.

Barber continued to practice law, and also became a lobbyist. He remained active in Republican politics; in 1970, he was the Windham County chairman of Senator Winston L. Prouty’s reelection campaign. In 1976 he was one of several former attorneys general who endorsed Republican candidate John M. Meaker for the position. (Meaker was defeated by Democratic incumbent M. Jerome Diamond.)

Barber died on June 14, 1992. He was buried at Morningside Cemetery in Brattleboro.

== Family ==
In 1938, Barber married Jeanne Freund. They were the parents of two children, Susan and Frank III. They divorced in 1946, and in 1949, Barber married Harriet Frances Fairbrother of Newport, Vermont. She was known as Frances, and they were the parents of two children, Hugh and Allison.

== Sources ==
=== Books ===
- China Offensive: The U.S. Army Campaigns of World War II. Washington, DC: US Government Printing Office. 1995. p. 10. ISBN 978-0-16-089761-0.
- Harvard Alumni Directory. Cambridge, MA: Harvard Alumni Association. 1948. p. 440.
- The American Bar. Minneapolis, MN: J.C. Fifield Company. 1962. p. 1477.
- The Martindale-Hubbell Law Directory. Vol. 6. New Providence, New Jersey: Martindale-Hubbell Law Directory, Incorporated. 1983. p. 82.
- The National Cyclopaedia of American Biography. Vol. 45. New York, NY: James T. White & Company. 1962. pp. 65–66.
- Vermont Legislative Directory. Montpelier, VT: Vermont Secretary of State. 1947. p. 417.

=== Magazines ===
- "Obituary, F. Elliott Barber". The Vermont Bar Journal & Law Digest. Vol. 18. Montpelier, VT: Vermont Bar Association. 1992. p. 45.

=== Newspapers ===
- "Personal: Mr. and Mrs. Frank E. Barber". Brattleboro Reformer. Brattleboro, VT. January 22, 1938. p. 5 – via Newspapers.com.
- "Elliott Barber Secures Divorce". Brattleboro Reformer. Brattleboro, VT. January 29, 1946. p. 1 – via Newspapers.com.
- "State Senators Elected: Windham County". Burlington Free Press. Burlington, VT. November 6, 1946. p. 2.
- "Senator Made Judge of Brattleboro Court". Burlington Free Press. Burlington, VT. Vermont Press Bureau. February 3, 1947. p. 2.
- "Bride Waits While Lawyer Bridegroom Argues Court Case". Burlington Free Press. Burlington, VT. July 10, 1947. p. 11.
- "Gibson names New Judges in Four Counties: 10 Other Municipal Judges in Vermont are Re-appointed". Burlington Free Press. Burlington, VT. February 1, 1949. p. 2.
- "Town Representative Winners: Windham County". Burlington Free Press. Burlington, VT. November 19, 1950. p. 16.
- "Vail Loses to Emerson in Tight Race: Governor's Margin is Slight; Other Primary Results". Burlington Free Press. Burlington, VT. September 13, 1952. p. 3.
- "Ike Gains Landslide Victory; Emerson Wins by 5807 Votes". Burlington Free Press. Burlington, VT. November 5, 1952. p. 1.
- "Parker Resigns Attorney-General Post as of Dec. 31; Elliott Barber Jr. Named to Office". Burlington Free Press. Burlington, VT. December 27, 1952. p. 2.
- "Rutland's Stafford takes Over Deputy Atty. General Post". Burlington Free Press. Burlington, VT. February 9, 1953. p. 1.
- "Johnson Spends $11,967 in Bid for Governor". Burlington Free Press. Burlington, VT. Morning Press Bureau. September 25, 1954. p. 2.
- "Consuelo Bailey Becomes First Woman Lt. Gov". Burlington Free Press. Burlington, VT. Associated Press. November 3, 1954. p. 1.
- "Robert Stafford Takes Over as Atty. General". Burlington Free Press. Burlington, VT. Vermont Press Bureau. January 7, 1955. p. 2.
- "Stafford Names Barber to State Liquor Board". Burlington Free Press. Burlington, VT. Morning Press Bureau. February 11, 1959. p. 3.
- "Elliott Barber Jr. Registers as Lobbyist". Burlington Free Press. Burlington, VT. March 7, 1959. p. 5.
- "News in Brief: Elliott Barber". Bennington Banner. Bennington, VT. Associated Press. January 28, 1963. p. 1.
- "County Chairmen Named for Prouty Reelection Drive". Burlington Free Press. Burlington, VT. October 2, 1970. p. 5.
- Republicans and Democrats Supporting John Meaker (October 31, 1976). "Advertisement: John P. Meaker for Attorney General". Burlington Free Press. Burlington, VT. p. 6.
- Clarke, Rod (November 3, 1976). "Snelling, Stafford, Diamond and Guest Victorious". Bennington Banner. Bennington, VT. United Press International. p. 1.
- "Vermont Deaths: Barber, Frances F." Burlington Free Press. Burlington, VT. January 3, 1983. p. 2B.
- "Obituary, Frances F. Barber". Rutland Herald. Rutland, VT. January 3, 1983. p. 6 – via Newspapers.com.
- "Barber Services". Brattleboro Reformer. Brattleboro, VT. January 21, 1992. p. 18 – via Newspapers.com.

=== Internet ===
- "Vermont Attorneys General, 1790-1795; 1904-Present". State Officers. Montpelier, VT: Vermont Secretary of State. Archived from the original on January 4, 2017.

Party political offices
Preceded by Clifton G. Parker	Republican nominee for Vermont Attorney General; 1952	Succeeded by Robert Stafford
Political offices
Preceded by Clifton G. Parker	Vermont Attorney General; 1952–1955	Succeeded by Robert Stafford
