= Alban J. Parker =

American politician

Member of the Vermont Senate from Windsor County
- In office January 14, 1954 – January 6, 1955 Serving with Susan E. Drown, Henry D. Vail
- Preceded by: Frank W. Corliss
- Succeeded by: Lewis E. Springer, Jr., Guy H. Cleveland, J. Harold Stacey

Member of the Vermont House of Representatives from Springfield
- In office January 1949 – January 1953
- Preceded by: Charles N. Safford
- Succeeded by: Howard R. Finn

10th Vermont Attorney General
- In office January 1941 – January 1947
- Governor: William Henry Wills; Mortimer R. Proctor
- Preceded by: Lawrence C. Jones
- Succeeded by: Clifton G. Parker

State's Attorney of Windsor County, Vermont
- In office February 1933 – June 1937
- Preceded by: Lawrence F. Edgerton
- Succeeded by: Henry F. Black

Personal details
- Born: March 21, 1893 Morrisville, Vermont, U.S
- Died: May 10, 1971 (aged 78) Springfield, Vermont
- Resting place: Oakland Cemetery, Springfield, Vermont
- Party: Republican
- Spouse(s): Alice G. Harriman (m. 1918); Caroline Bernardini (m. 1941)
- Children: 3
- Education: Middlebury College
- Profession: Attorney

Military service
- Allegiance: United States
- Service: United States Army
- Years of service: 1917–1919
- Rank: Second Lieutenant
- Unit: U.S. Army Ordnance Corps
- Wars: World War I

Alban J. Parker (March 21, 1893 – May 10, 1971) was a Vermont attorney and politician who served as Vermont Attorney General from 1941 to 1947.

== Biography ==
Alban James Parker was born in Morrisville, Vermont on March 21, 1893, the son of Joel R. and Ann R. (Bullock) Parker. He graduated from Morrisville's People's Academy in 1911, and attended Middlebury College. After graduating in 1916, he worked as a school teacher and principal in Keene, New Hampshire, Hartford, Vermont, and White River Junction, Vermont.

Parker enlisted for World War I, was commissioned as a second lieutenant in the Ordnance Corps, and served in the aerial armament field at posts including Camp Devens, Massachusetts, and Selfridge Field, Michigan until receiving his discharge in October 1919.

Upon returning to Vermont, Parker resumed his career as a teacher and principal, and also studied law in the Hartford office of attorney Raymond J. Trainor. In 1926 he was admitted to the bar and began to practice in partnership with Trainor. He subsequently relocated to Springfield, Vermont, where he continued to practice law.

A Republican, from 1933 to 1937 Parker served as state's attorney for Windsor County. From 1937 to 1941 he was Vermont's Deputy Attorney General.

In 1940, Parker was the successful Republican nominee for Vermont Attorney General. He was reelected in 1942 and 1944, and served from January 1941 to January 1947. He did not run for reelection in 1946.

After serving as attorney general, Parker resumed practicing law. From 1949 to 1953 he served in the Vermont House of Representatives. In January 1954, he was appointed to fill a vacancy in the Vermont State Senate.

Parker died in Springfield on May 10, 1971. He was buried at Oakland Cemetery in Springfield.

== Family ==
In 1918, Parker married Alice G. Harriman of Middlebury. In 1941, he married his second wife, Caroline Bernardini.

Parker was the father of three children, daughters Harriet Ann and Judith, and son Richard Henry.

== Sources ==
=== Books ===
- Johnson, Herbert T. (1927). Roster of Vermont Men and Women in the World War. Tuttle Company: Rutland, Vermont. p. 984.
- Stone, Arthur F. (1929). The Vermont of Today, with its Background, Attractions and People. Vol. 3. New York, New York: Lewis Historical Publishing Company. p. 89.
- The American Bar. Vol. 25. Minneapolis, Minneapolis: J.C. Fifield Company. 1962. p. 1481.

=== Newspapers ===
- "Four Appointments Are Still Held Up". The Burlington Free Press. Burlington, Vermont. Vermont Press Bureau. January 31, 1941. p. 3 – via Newspapers.com.
- "Clifton Parker Candidate for Attorney-Gen.: Alban J. Parker Will Not Run for Reelection; Calls Six Years Enough". The Burlington Free Press. Burlington, Vermont. Morning Press Bureau. March 29, 1946. p. 3 – via Newspapers.com.
- "Corliss, New FHA Chief, Ruled Off State Social Welfare Board". The Burlington Free Press. Burlington, Vermont. Morning Press Bureau. January 20, 1954. p. 3 – via Newspapers.com.
- "Obituaries: Attorney A. J. Parker Dies, Prominent in Windsor Politics". Bennington Banner. Bennington, Vermont. May 11, 1971. p. 16 – via Newspapers.com.

Party political offices
Preceded by Lawrence C. Jones	Republican nominee for Vermont Attorney General; 1940, 1942, 1944	Succeeded by Clifton G. Parker
Political offices
Preceded by Lawrence C. Jones	Vermont Attorney General; 1941–1947	Succeeded by Clifton G. Parker
