= Rufus E. Brown =

American politician (1854–1920)

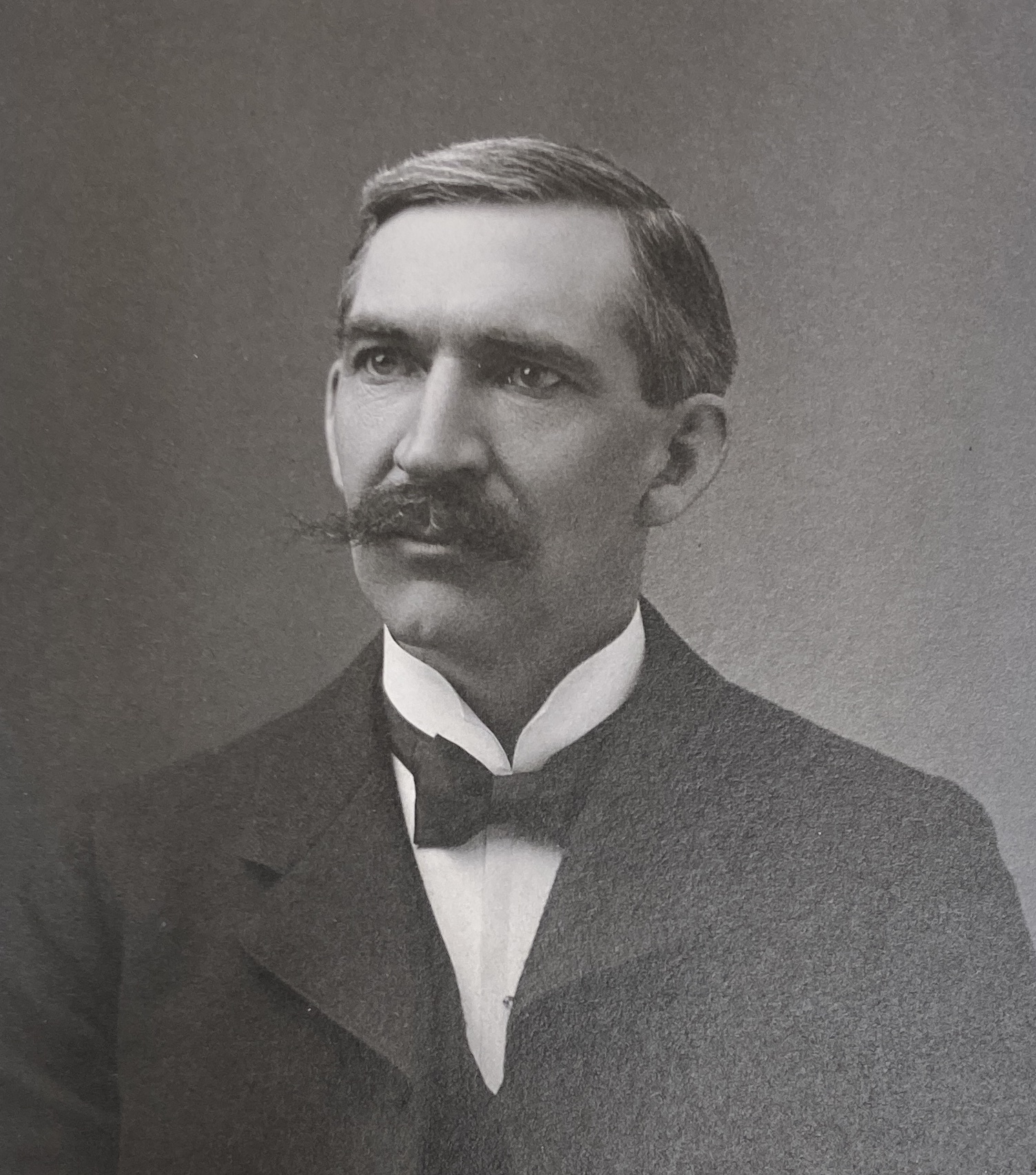
- Brown in 1900

Vermont Attorney General
- In office 1912–1914
- Governor: Allen M. Fletcher
- Preceded by: John G. Sargent
- Succeeded by: Herbert G. Barber

Member of the Vermont Senate from Chittenden County
- In office 1900–1902 Serving with W. H. H. Varney, W. J. Fuller
- Preceded by: Charles P. Smith, Ellery C. Fay, G. W. Sales
- Succeeded by: Chauncey W. Brownell, Elliot M. Sutton, George W. Sayles

State's Attorney of Chittenden County, Vermont
- In office 1894–1900
- Preceded by: Judson E. Cushman
- Succeeded by: Edmund C. Mower

Personal details
- Born: December 3, 1854 Dickinson, New York, U.S.
- Died: June 15, 1920 (aged 65) Burlington, Vermont
- Resting place: Lakeview Cemetery, Burlington, Vermont
- Party: Republican
- Spouse(s): Della F. Wood; Josephine (Josie) Sayles; Elizabeth Brownell
- Children: 1
- Profession: Attorney

Rufus Everson Brown (December 3, 1854 – June 15, 1920) was a Vermont attorney, farmer and politician. He served as Vermont Attorney General from 1912 to 1915.

== Early life ==
Rufus Everson Brown was born in Dickinson, New York on December 3, 1854. He attended academies in Lawrenceville and Amsterdam before relocating to Burlington, Vermont to study law.

== Legal career ==
Brown studied at the firm of Wales and Taft, which included Torrey E. Wales and Russell S. Taft, both prominent politicians and judges. He attained admission to the bar in 1880, and operated a farm while beginning a law practice.

In 1891 he opened an office in Burlington and began to practice law full-time. In 1897 he started Brown & Macomber in partnership with James H. Macomber. In 1903 he formed a new partnership with Russell W. Taft, the son of Russell S. Taft.

== Political career ==
A Republican, Brown served as Burlington's grand juror (city prosecutor) from 1892 to 1894. From 1894 to 1900 he served as state's attorney for Chittenden County. From 1900 to 1902 Brown was a member of the Vermont State Senate. In 1903 he was appointed Burlington's city attorney.

In 1912, Brown defeated Frank C. Archibald in the Republican primary for Vermont Attorney General. He won the general election, and served from 1912 to 1914. His term expired in November 1914; under a new statute, terms for statewide office holders were scheduled to begin in January starting in 1915. To bridge the gap between the end of Brown's term in November 1914 and the start of Herbert G. Barber's in January 1915, Governor Allen M. Fletcher appointed Barber to serve for the month of December 1914. Brown later served as judge of Burlington's city court.

== Death and burial ==
Brown died in Burlington on June 15, 1920. He was buried at Lakeview Cemetery in Burlington.

== Family ==
In 1877 he married Della F. Wood (b. 1860) of Williston, Vermont. They were the parents of a son, Ralph Earle (b. 1879).

In 1902 Brown married Josephine (Josie) Sayles (1875-1944).

His third wife was Elizabeth Brownell (1876-1948).

Party political offices
Preceded by John G. Sargent	Republican nominee for Vermont Attorney General; 1912	Succeeded by Herbert G. Barber
Political offices
Preceded by John G. Sargent	Vermont Attorney General; 1912–1914	Succeeded by Herbert G. Barber
