= Herbert Barber =

Herbert Barber may refer to:

- Herbert Spencer Barber (1882–1950), American entomologist
- Herbert G. Barber (1870–1947), Vermont attorney and politician
