= Frank C. Archibald =

Frank Archibald or Frank C. Archibald may refer to:

- Frank Archibald (died 1975), Aboriginal Australian elder in honour of whom the Frank Archibald Memorial Lecture at the University of New England was named
- Frank C. Archibald (Newfoundland politician) (1887–1972), Canadian politician
- Frank C. Archibald (Vermont politician) (1857–1935), American politician and attorney
