= Dunklee =

Dunklee is a surname. Notable people with the surname include:

- Ernest W. Dunklee (1890–1974), American farmer and politician
- Everett Dunklee (born 1946), American cross-country skier
- Stan Dunklee (born 1954), American cross-country skier
- Susan Dunklee (born 1986), American biathlete
