= Fisher Covered Railroad Bridge =

- U.S. National Register of Historic Places
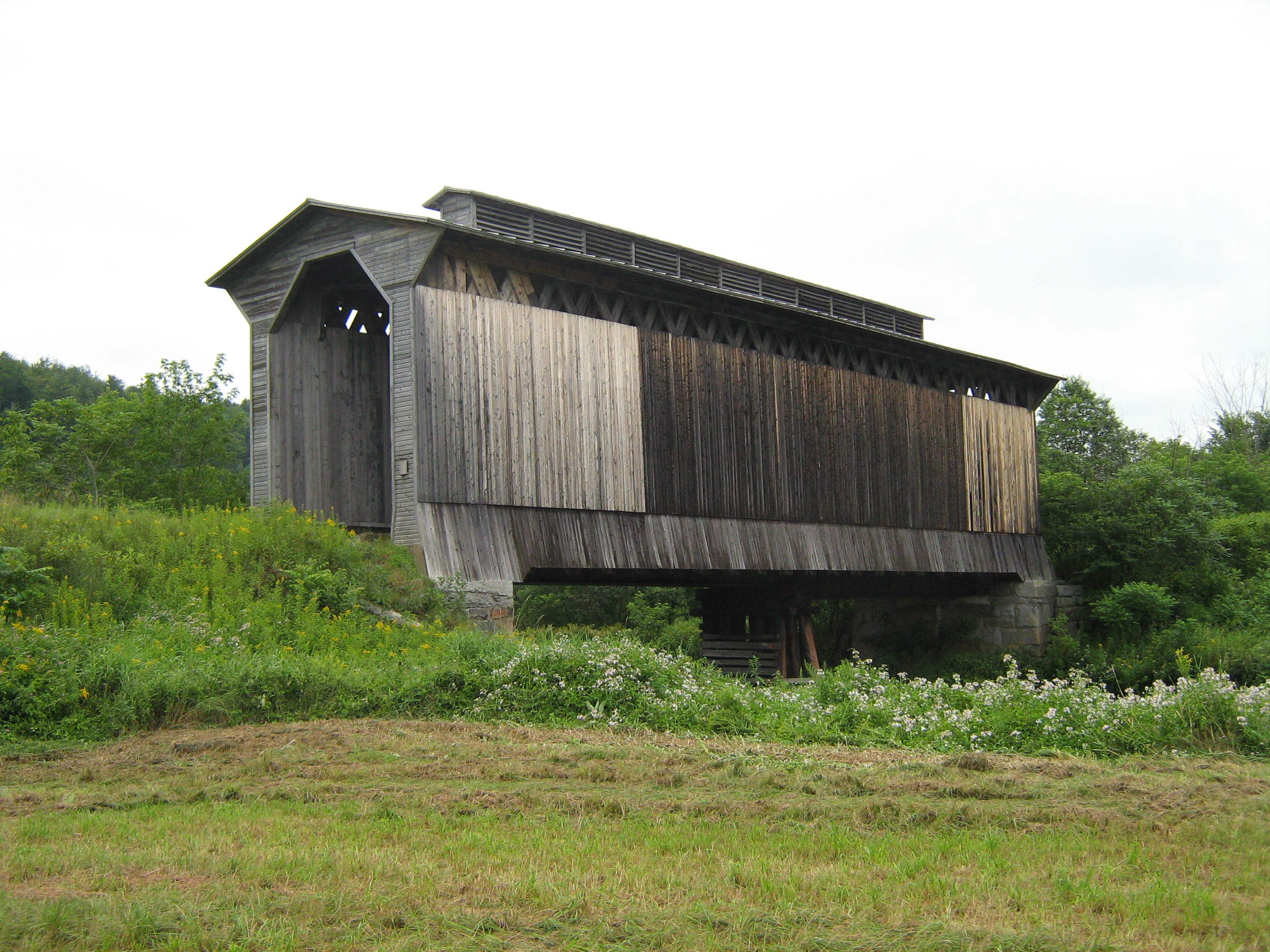
- View of the bridge looking west, from the north side

- Location within Vermont Location within the United States
- Location: Southeast of Wolcott, over the Lamoille River S of VT 15, Wolcott, Vermont
- Coordinates: 44°31′56.28″N 72°25′39.69″W
- Area: 1 acre (0.40 ha)
- Built: 1908
- Architectural style: Double Town lattice truss
- NRHP reference No.: 74000222
- Added to NRHP: October 1, 1974

The Fisher Covered Railroad Bridge is a covered bridge in Wolcott, Vermont. Built in 1908, it originally carried the St. Johnsbury and Lamoille County Railroad line over the Lamoille River. Now closed, it was the last covered bridge in Vermont to carry railroad traffic, and is a rare surviving example in the state of a double Town lattice truss. It was listed on the National Register of Historic Places in 1974. The bridge is currently part of the Lamoille County Rail Trail.

== Description and history ==
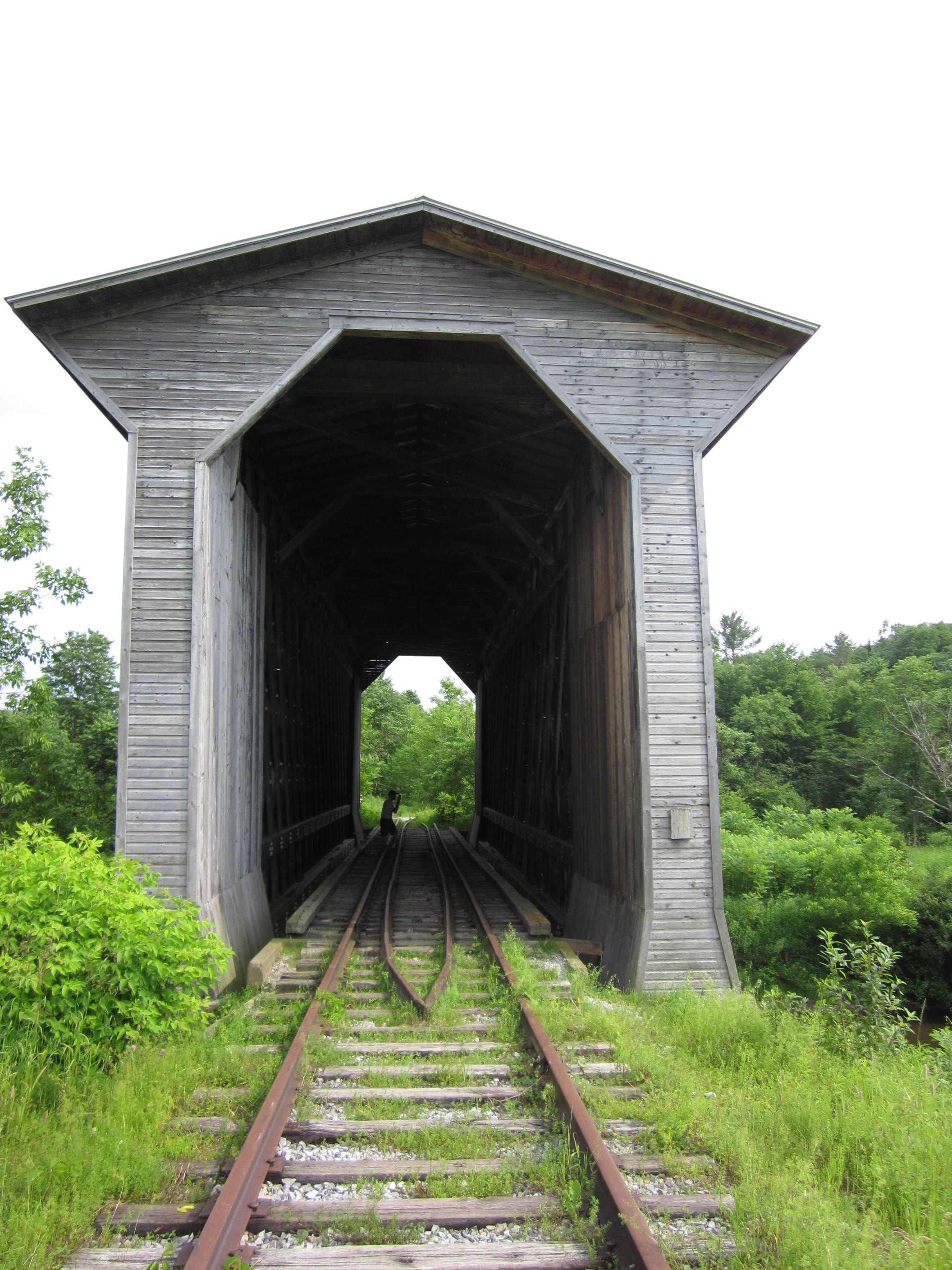
Interior of the bridge showing railroad tracks

The Fisher Covered Railroad Bridge stands in a rural area southeast of the village center of Wolcott, south of Vermont Route 15. It spans the Lamoille River in a northwest–southeast orientation, and is accessed from a small parking area just to the north. The bridge is a two-span doubled Town lattice truss, with a total length of 103.5 feet (31.5 m) and a width of 20.5 feet (6.2 m), with an inside track width of 15 feet (4.6 m). It rests on stone abutments capped in concrete. The bridge is covered by a gabled roof which has a distinctive central monitor for much of its length. The exterior of the bridge is clad in vertical board siding which rises most of the way to the roof, leaving an open strip at the top of the sides. The siding extends into the portals a short way, and there is a band of skirt-style siding extending below the main siding. The decking now has a steel I-beam substructure, leaving the trusses to only support the superstructure.

The bridge was built in 1908, and was, at the time of its listing on the National Register in 1974, the last covered bridge in the United States to carry railroad traffic. It was built by the Boston and Maine Railroad on the route of the St. Johnsbury and Lamoille County Railroad, which it controlled. In 1968, it was threatened with demolition in favor of a steel truss. A pier was built under the bridge, and four steel girders were installed to support the bridge's load.

== See also ==
- National Register of Historic Places listings in Lamoille County, Vermont
- List of Vermont covered bridges
- List of bridges on the National Register of Historic Places in Vermont
