= J. Ward Carver =

American politician

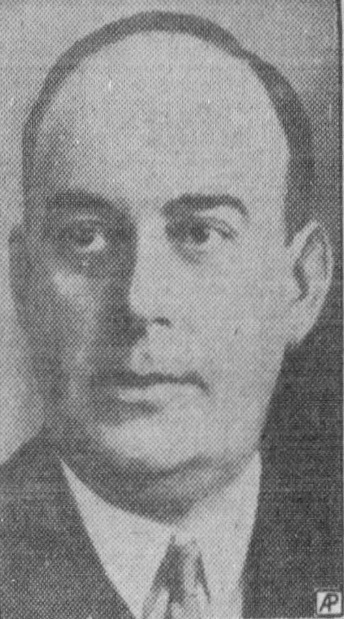
- The Barre Daily Times (Barre, Vermont), July 23, 1942

Vermont Attorney General
- In office 1925–1931
- Governor: Franklin S. Billings; John E. Weeks
- Preceded by: Frank C. Archibald
- Succeeded by: Lawrence C. Jones

President of the Vermont Bar Association
- In office 1935–1936
- Preceded by: Collins M. Graves
- Succeeded by: Charles F. Black

Member of the Vermont Senate
- In office 1915–1917 Serving with Heber C. Cady, Orlando L. Martin
- Preceded by: Elber B. House, Fred L. Laird, George W. Wallace
- Succeeded by: Frank C. Bancroft, Bertrand R. Demeritt, Fred E. Steele
- Constituency: Washington County

State's Attorney of Washington County, Vermont
- In office 1910–1915
- Preceded by: Benjamin Gates
- Succeeded by: Fred E. Gleason

Personal details
- Born: February 19, 1881 Calais, Vermont, U.S.
- Died: July 22, 1942 (aged 61) Barre, Vermont, U.S.
- Resting place: Elmwood Cemetery, Barre, Vermont, U.S.
- Party: Republican
- Spouse: Zoe H. Towers (m. 1011)
- Education: Goddard Seminary
- Profession: Attorney

Jay Ward Carver (February 19, 1881 – July 22, 1942) was a Vermont lawyer who served as state Attorney General.

== Biography ==
J. Ward Carver was born in Calais, Vermont on February 19, 1881. He was raised in Marshfield, graduated from Montpelier High School, and then graduated from Goddard Seminary in 1900.

While teaching school Carver studied law with Barre attorney John W. Gordon, was admitted to the bar in 1905, and practiced in Barre. A Republican, he served as Barre's corporation counsel, State's Attorney for Washington County, and a member of the Vermont State Senate.

In 1925 Carver was appointed Vermont Attorney General, filling the vacancy caused by the resignation of Frank C. Archibald. Carver was elected to full terms in 1926 and 1928, and served from 1925 to 1931.

In the 1930s Carver practiced law in partnership with Stanley C. Wilson, F. Ray Keyser Sr., and Deane C. Davis. Their firm was described as Vermont's "best ever collection of legal talent," in that it included one Vermont Supreme Court Justice (Keyser), two Governors (Wilson and Davis), and one state Attorney General (Carver).

From 1935 to 1936 Carver served as president of the Vermont Bar Association.

Carver died in Barre on July 22, 1942, aged 61. He was buried at Elmwood Cemetery in Barre.

== Family ==
In 1911, Carver married Zoe H. Towers of Richmond, Vermont.

== Sources ==
Party political offices
Preceded by Frank C. Archibald	Republican nominee for Vermont Attorney General; 1926, 1928	Succeeded by Lawrence C. Jones
Political offices
Preceded by Frank C. Archibald	Vermont Attorney General; 1925 – 1931	Succeeded by Lawrence C. Jones
