= W. Arthur Simpson =

American politician (1887–1971)

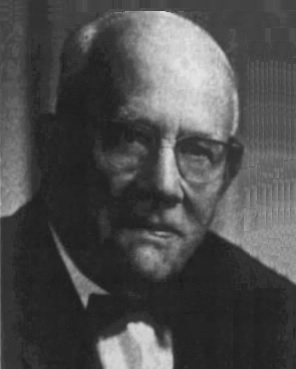

Member of the Vermont House of Representatives
- In office 1963–1969
- Succeeded by: John McClaughry
- Constituency: 26th district
- In office 1947–1949
- In office 1923–1927

Member of the Vermont Senate from the Caledonia district
- In office 1927–1929

Personal details
- Born: Wilder Arthur Simpson; May 22, 1887 Lyndon, Vermont, U.S.
- Died: March 31, 1971 (aged 83) St. Johnsbury, Vermont, U.S.
- Party: Republican
- Spouse: Ruth Hoffman (m. 1912)
- Children: 4

Wilder Arthur Simpson (May 22, 1887 – March 31, 1971) was an American politician who served in both houses of the Vermont General Assembly. He ran for governor in 1930, 1932, 1944, and 1960 but was unsuccessful in the Republican primary each time. Known as Vermont's "Mr. Republican," he supported a number of Democratic candidates later in life, including Philip H. Hoff.

Simpson married the former Ruth Hoffman on July 24, 1912. Together they had one son and three daughters.
