= General Parker =

General Parker may refer to:

- Daniel Parker (general) (1782–1846), U.S. Army four-star general
- Edwin P. Parker Jr. (1891–1983), U.S. Army major general
- Ellis D. Parker (1932–2020), U.S. Army lieutenant general
- Ely S. Parker (1828–1895), U.S. Army brevet brigadier general
- Frank Parker (general) (1872–1947), U.S. Army major general
- George M. Parker (general) (1889–1968), U.S. Army major general
- George Lane Parker (1724–1791), British Army lieutenant general
- Gervais Parker (1695–1750), British Army general of foot
- James Parker (Medal of Honor) (1854–1934), U.S. Army major general
- John Henry Parker (general) (1866–1942), U.S. Army brigadier general
- Nick Parker (born 1954), British Army general
- Robert W. Parker (general) (1960s–1990s), U.S. Air Force major general
- Roy H. Parker (1890–1970), U.S. Army major general
- Theodore W. Parker (1909–1994), U.S. Army four-star general
- Thomas Parker (soldier, born 1753) (1753–1820), U.S. Army brigadier general

== See also ==
- Attorney General Parker (disambiguation)
