= Wolcott, Vermont =

- Town
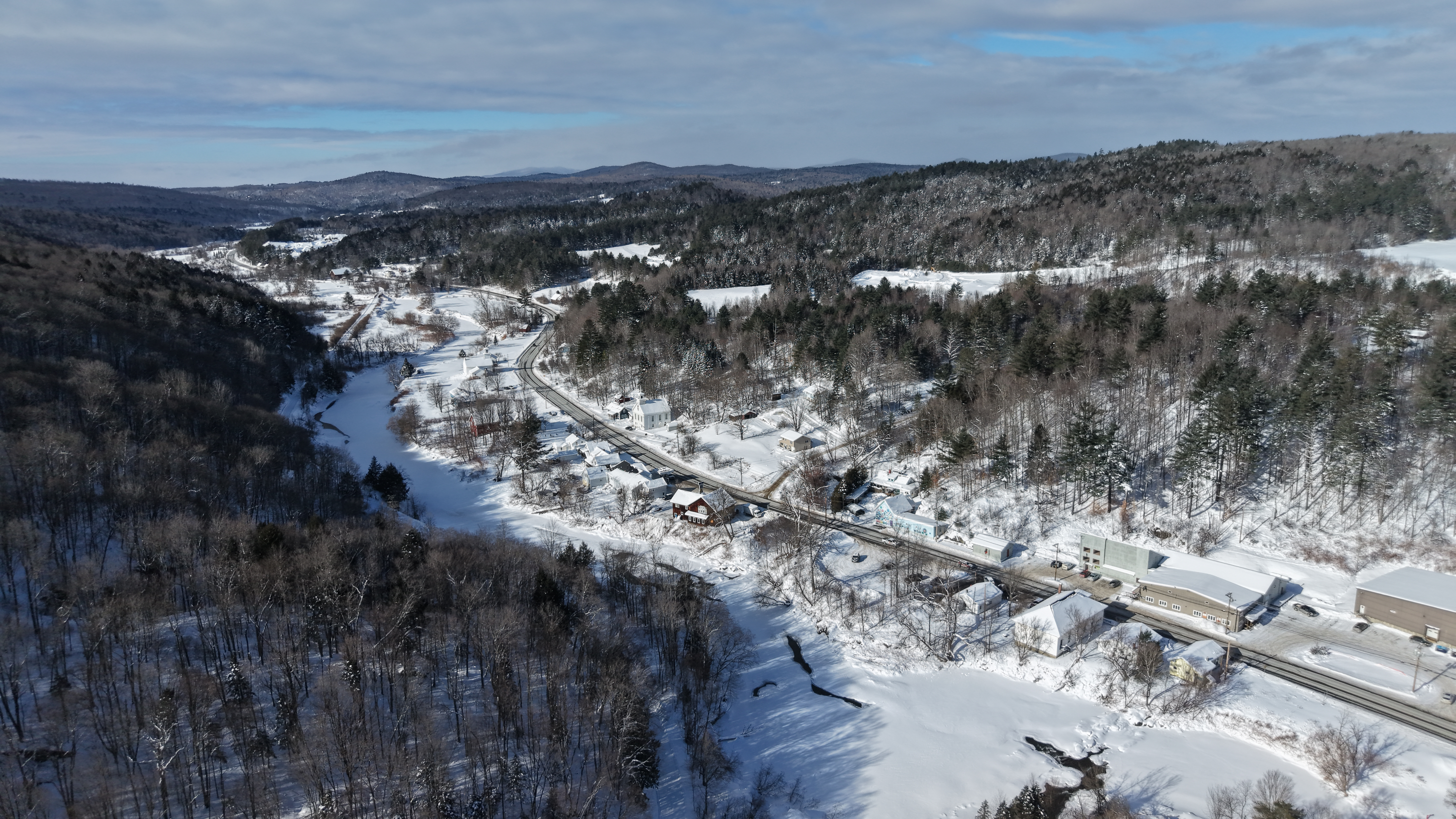
- Wolcott, VT, from the southeast

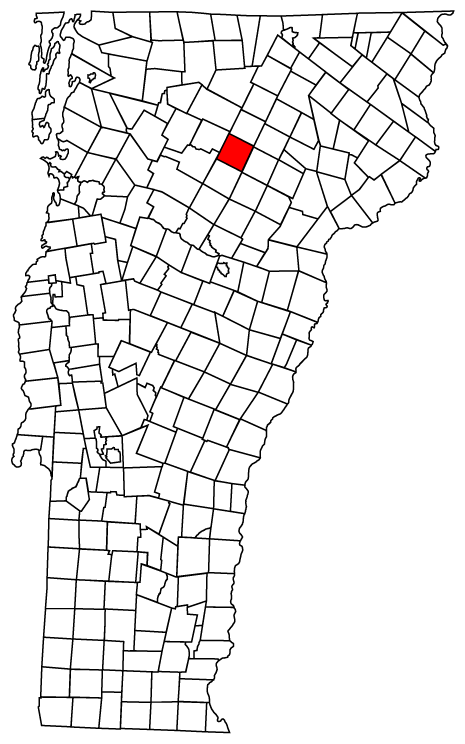
- Wolcott, Vermont
- Coordinates: 44°35′20″N 72°27′32″W
- Country: United States
- State: Vermont
- County: Lamoille
- Communities: Wolcott; North Wolcott

Area
  - Total: 39.2 sq mi (101.4 km^{2})
  - Land: 38.8 sq mi (100.5 km^{2})
  - Water: 0.35 sq mi (0.9 km^{2})
- Elevation: 1,247 ft (380 m)

Population (2020)
  - Total: 1,670
  - Density: 43/sq mi (16.6/km^{2})
- Time zone: UTC-5 (Eastern (EST))
  - Summer (DST): UTC-4 (EDT)
- ZIP code: 05680
- Area code: 802
- FIPS code: 50-85375
- GNIS feature ID: 1462269
- Website: www.wolcottvt.org

Wolcott is a town in Lamoille County, Vermont, United States. The town was named for General Oliver Wolcott, a signer of the Declaration of Independence. The population was 1,670 at the 2020 census.

== Geography ==
Wolcott is the easternmost town in Lamoille County. It is bordered to the northeast by Orleans County and to the southeast by Caledonia County. The Lamoille River crosses the southern part of the town from east to west, followed by Vermont Route 15, which leads northwest 8 miles (13 km) to Morrisville and southeast 6 miles (10 km) to Hardwick. The unincorporated village of Wolcott is in the southern part of the town, along Route 15.

According to the United States Census Bureau, the town of Wolcott has a total area of 39.2 square miles (101.4 km^{2}), of which 38.8 square miles (100.5 km^{2}) are land and 0.35 square miles (0.9 km^{2}), or 0.88%, are water.

== Government ==
=== Legislators ===
The Essex-Orleans Senate district includes the town of Wolcott, as well as parts or all of Essex County, Orleans County, Franklin County and Lamoille County. The district is represented in the Vermont House by Daniel Noyes (D) and Kate Donnally (D).

== Demographics ==
Historical population
Census	Pop.	Note	%±
1790	32		—
1800	47		46.9%
1810	124		163.8%
1820	123		−0.8%
1830	492		300.0%
1840	824		67.5%
1850	909		10.3%
1860	1,161		27.7%
1870	1,132		−2.5%
1880	1,166		3.0%
1890	1,158		−0.7%
1900	1,066		−7.9%
1910	1,049		−1.6%
1920	932		−11.2%
1930	831		−10.8%
1940	772		−7.1%
1950	766		−0.8%
1960	633		−17.4%
1970	676		6.8%
1980	986		45.9%
1990	1,229		24.6%
2000	1,456		18.5%
2010	1,676		15.1%
2020	1,670		−0.4%
U.S. Decennial Census

As of the census of 2000, there were 1,456 people, 552 households, and 401 families residing in the town. The population density was 37.3 people per square mile (14.4/km^{2}). There were 646 housing units at an average density of 16.6 per square mile (6.4/km^{2}). The racial makeup of the town was 98.83% White, 0.07% Black or African American, 0.27% Native American, 0.07% Asian, 0.14% Pacific Islander, and 0.62% from two or more races. Hispanic or Latino of any race were 0.34% of the population.

There were 552 households, out of which 39.9% had children under the age of 18 living with them, 58.2% were married couples living together, 7.4% had a female householder with no husband present, and 27.2% were non-families. 18.8% of all households were made up of individuals, and 5.8% had someone living alone who was 65 years of age or older. The average household size was 2.63 and the average family size was 2.99.

In the town, the population was spread out, with 28.4% under the age of 18, 7.3% from 18 to 24, 34.0% from 25 to 44, 23.4% from 45 to 64, and 6.9% who were 65 years of age or older. The median age was 33 years. For every 100 females, there were 105.6 males. For every 100 females age 18 and over, there were 102.3 males.

== Economy ==
=== Personal income ===
The median income for a household in the town was $34,760, and the median income for a family was $38,056. Males had a median income of $27,898 versus $21,905 for females. The per capita income for the town was $15,198. About 10.2% of families and 14.6% of the population were below the poverty line, including 24.8% of those under age 18 and 18.6% of those age 65 or over.

== Recreation ==
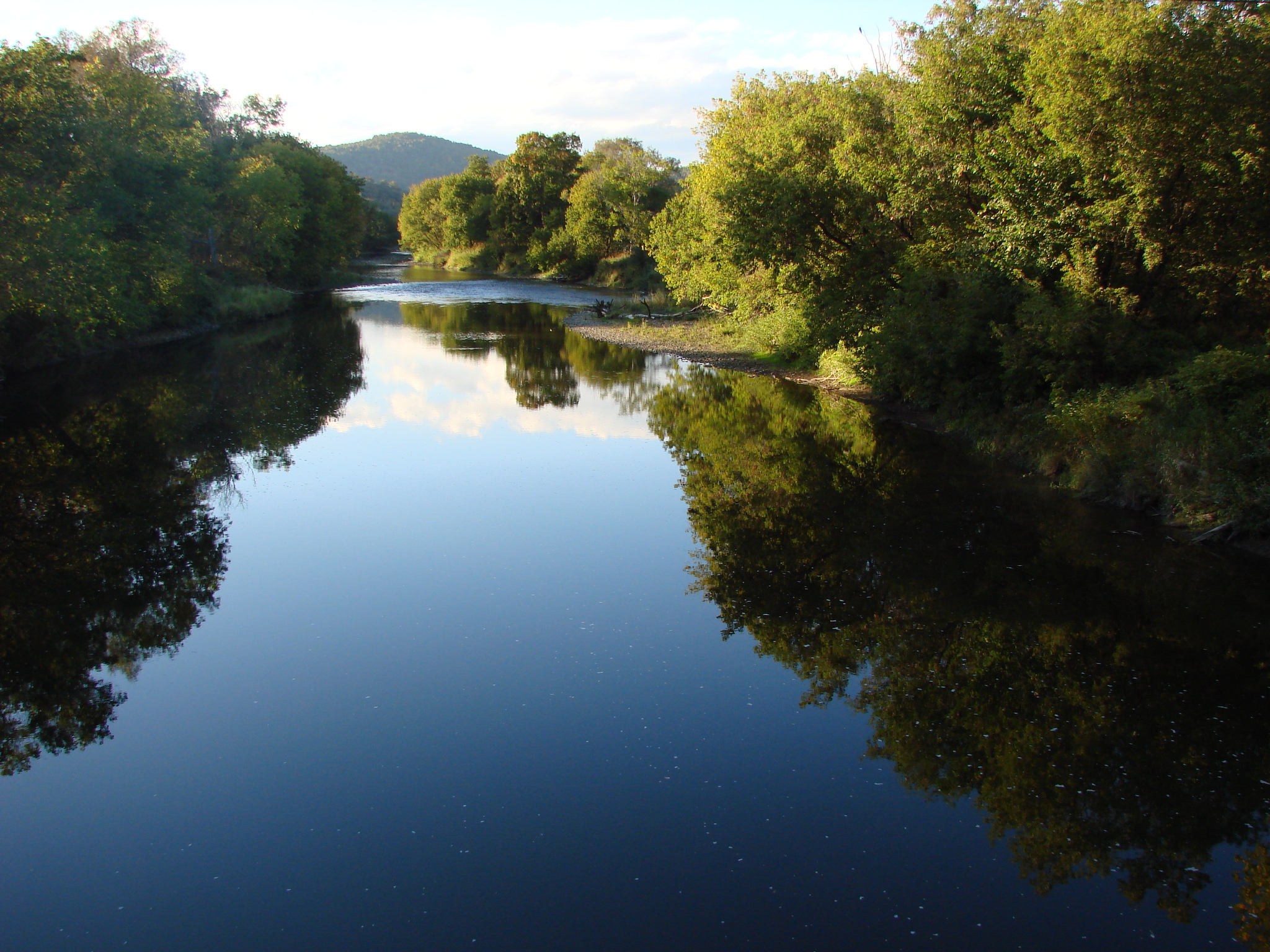
Lamoille River

The Fisher Covered Railroad Bridge is the easternmost access point for the Lamoille River Paddlers Trail in Wolcott. Boaters can also access the Paddlers Trail three miles downstream at the Elmore (Pond) Road bridge to avoid a portage around the Wolcott Dam. Wolcott is an access and parking point along the Lamoille Valley Rail Trail, which passes over the Fisher Covered Railroad Bridge, the last covered bridge in Vermont to carry railroad traffic, in Wolcott.

== Notable people ==
- George S. Brown, founder of the Wolcott United Methodist Church
- David Budbill, poet and playwright
- Clifton G. Parker, Vermont Attorney General
