= Ella Sharp Museum =

- Ella Sharp House
- U.S. National Register of Historic Places
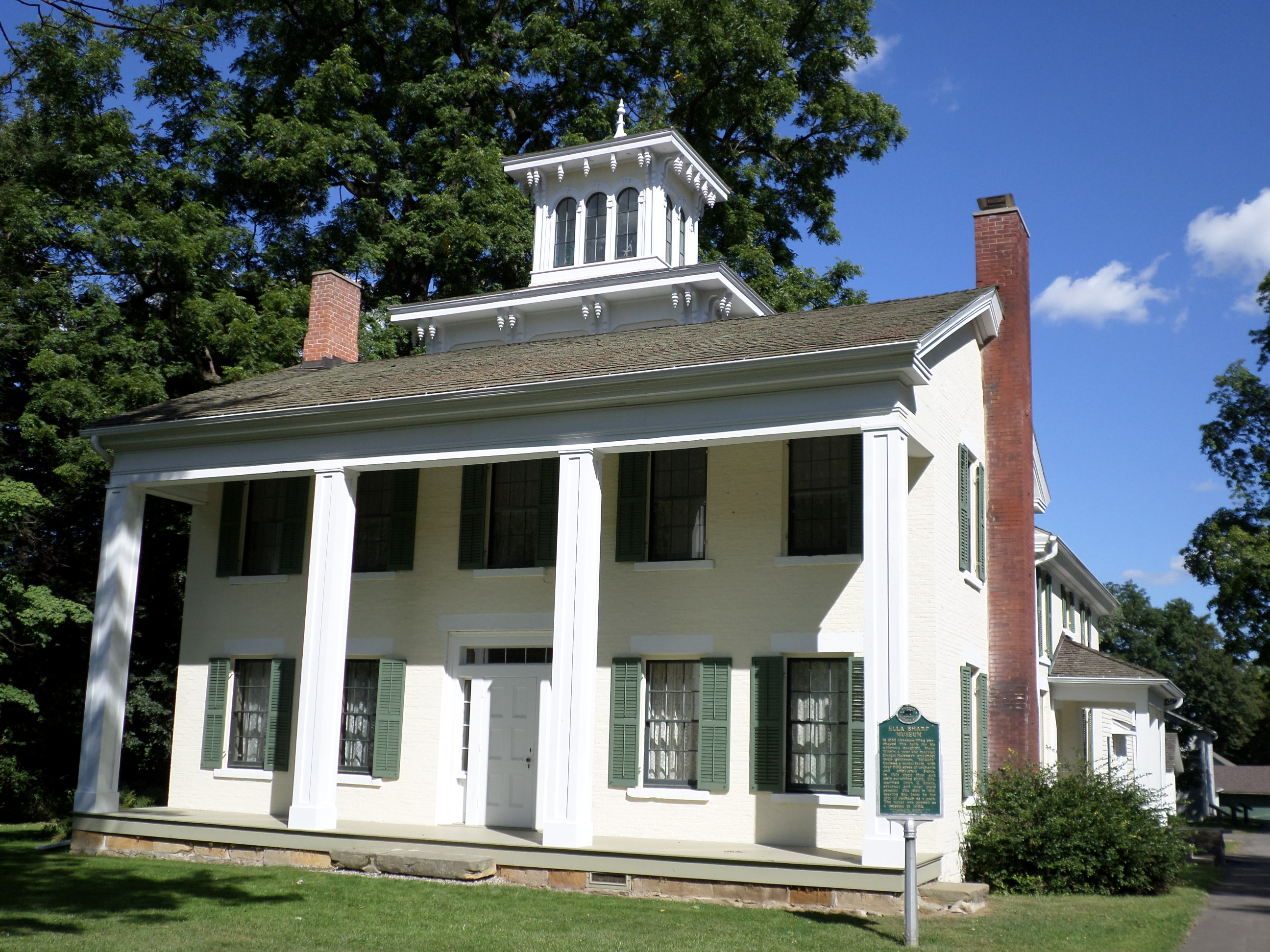
- Interactive map
- Location: 3225 4th St., Jackson, Michigan
- Coordinates: 42°12′54″N 84°25′04″W
- Area: 1 acre (0.40 ha)
- Architectural style: Italianate
- NRHP reference No.: 72000622
- Added to NRHP: August 25, 1972

The Ella Sharp Museum is a historical museum located at 3225 4th Street in Jackson, Michigan. The original structure is a nineteenth-century farmhouse, the Ella Sharp House (also known as the Merriman-Sharp House), which was listed on the National Register of Historic Places in 1972.

== History ==
In 1855, Abraham Wing of Glen Falls, New York purchased a large farm at this location, then on the outskirts of the city of Jackson. In 1856, Wing's daughter Mary married Dwight Merriman, and the couple assumed management of the farm, although Wing still owned it. The farm at the time included a small house, likely built in the early 1840s. The Merrimans immediately expanded this house by adding a Greek Revival front section to it. In 1862, they expanded the house again, adding an Italianate tower and another small addition.

By the 1860s, the farm was one of the most prosperous in the area, and the Merrimans were active in the community's social life. The Merrimans had four children, three of whom died young. The fourth, Ella, was born in 1857.

In 1881, Ella married John C. Sharp, a lawyer who had served as Jackson City Attorney and as Prosecuting Attorney for Jackson County. In 1884, The Merrimans turned their farm over to John and Ella Sharp to move into town, and John discontinued his law practice to concentrate on farming. Under the Sharps management, the farm improved even more. John Sharp died in 1908, and Ella Sharp continued to manage the farm until her death in 1912. Ella Sharp bequeathed the house and farm to the city of Jackson to be used as a museum and park.

The city of Jackson hired Winiford C. Trout, who began laying out the grounds of the park in 1915. The Ella Sharp Park was opened in 1916. Trout used the farmhouse for over 20 years as his residence, during his tenure as supervisor of the park. However, the Ella Sharp Museum did not open until 1965.

== Description ==
The Ella Sharp House is a two-story brick structure with an attached three-story freestanding Italianate tower topped with a wooden cupola. The house has a tetrastyle two story front porch. The windows are six over six units with stone lintels and sills and shutters. The surrounding yard is enclosed by a solid stone wall, designed and constructed circa 1865 by George S. Brown, an African American Methodist minister and stonemason from New York. A carriage porch graces the south side-of the house.

The Ella Sharp Museum contains other buildings in a surrounding historical complex. These include the 1875 Dibble School, a c. 1840 log cabin, and a country store.
