= 1940 Vermont gubernatorial election =

- November 5, 1940
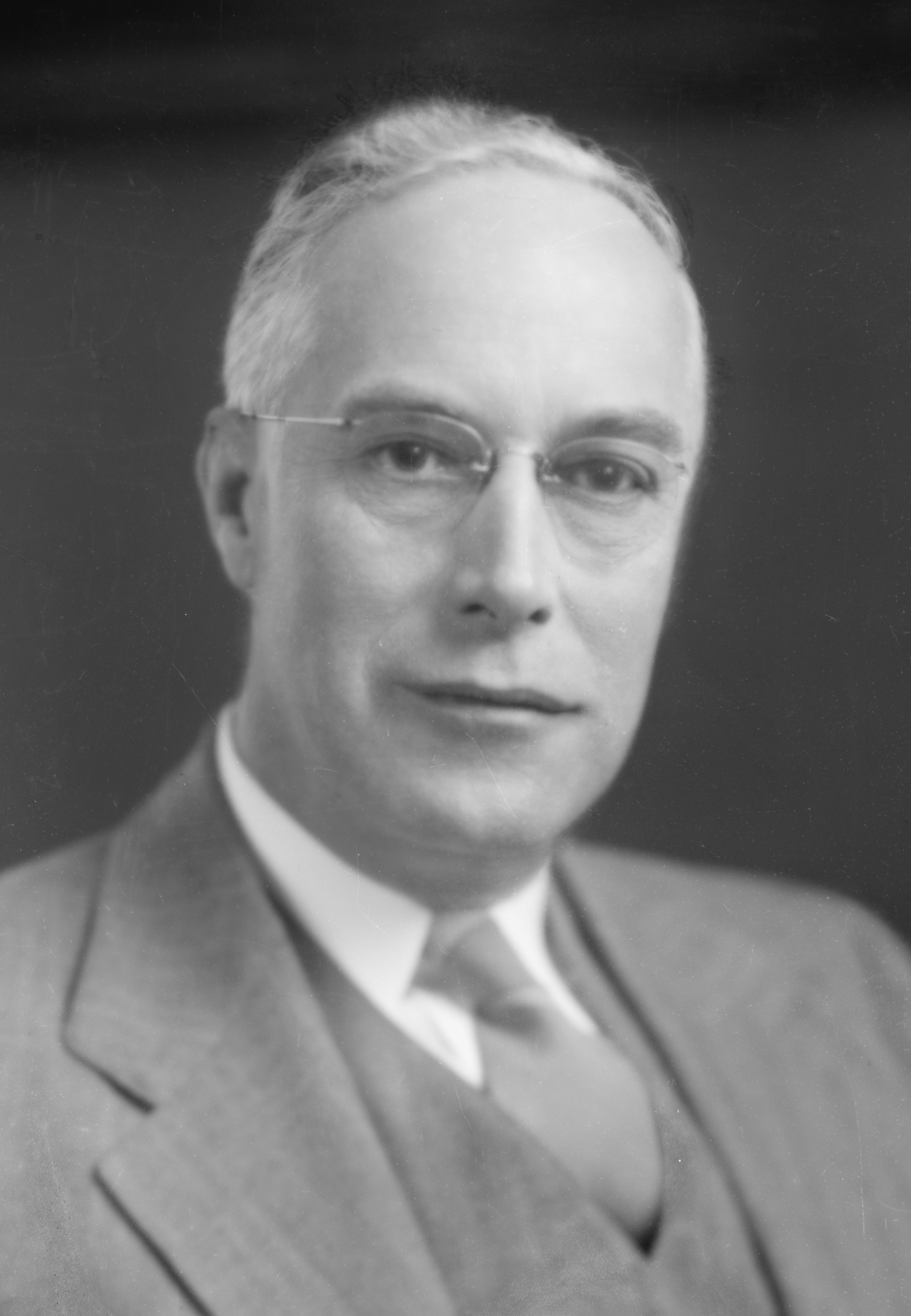

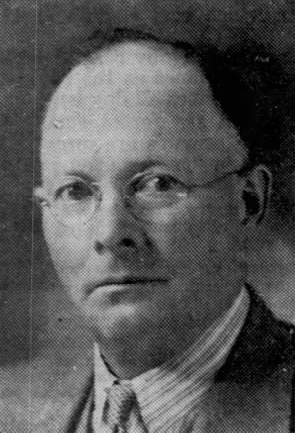
Nominee	William H. Wills	John McGrath
Party	Republican	Democratic
Popular vote	87,346	49,068
Percentage	64.03%	35.97%
- Wills: 50–60% 60–70% 70–80% 80–90% 90-100% McGrath: 50–60% 60–70% 80–90% Tie: 50% No Vote/Data
Governor before election
George Aiken
Republican
Elected Governor
William H. Wills
Republican

The 1940 Vermont gubernatorial election took place on November 5, 1940. Incumbent Republican George Aiken did not run for re-election to a third term as Governor of Vermont, instead running for the United States Senate. Republican candidate William H. Wills defeated Democratic candidate John McGrath to succeed him.

== Republican primary ==
=== Results ===
Republican primary results
Party	Candidate	Votes	%	±%
Republican	William H. Wills	58,435	99.9	
Republican	Other	17	0.0	
Total votes		58,452	100.0	

== Democratic primary ==
=== Results ===
Democratic primary results
Party	Candidate	Votes	%	±%
Democratic	John McGrath	5,639	99.9	
Democratic	Other	5	0.1	
Total votes		5,644	100.0	

== General election ==
=== Candidates ===
- William H. Wills (Republican), Lieutenant Governor of Vermont
- John McGrath (Democratic), state senator, milk farmer, businessman and nominee for U.S. Senate in 1938

=== Results ===
1940 Vermont gubernatorial election
Party	Candidate	Votes	%	±%
Republican	William H. Wills	87,346	64.03	
Democratic	John McGrath	49,068	35.07	
N/A	Other	2	0.00	
Total votes		136,416	100.0	
