= 1960 Vermont gubernatorial election =

- November 8, 1960
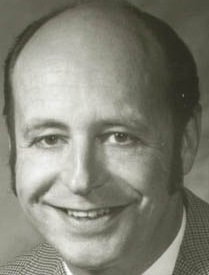

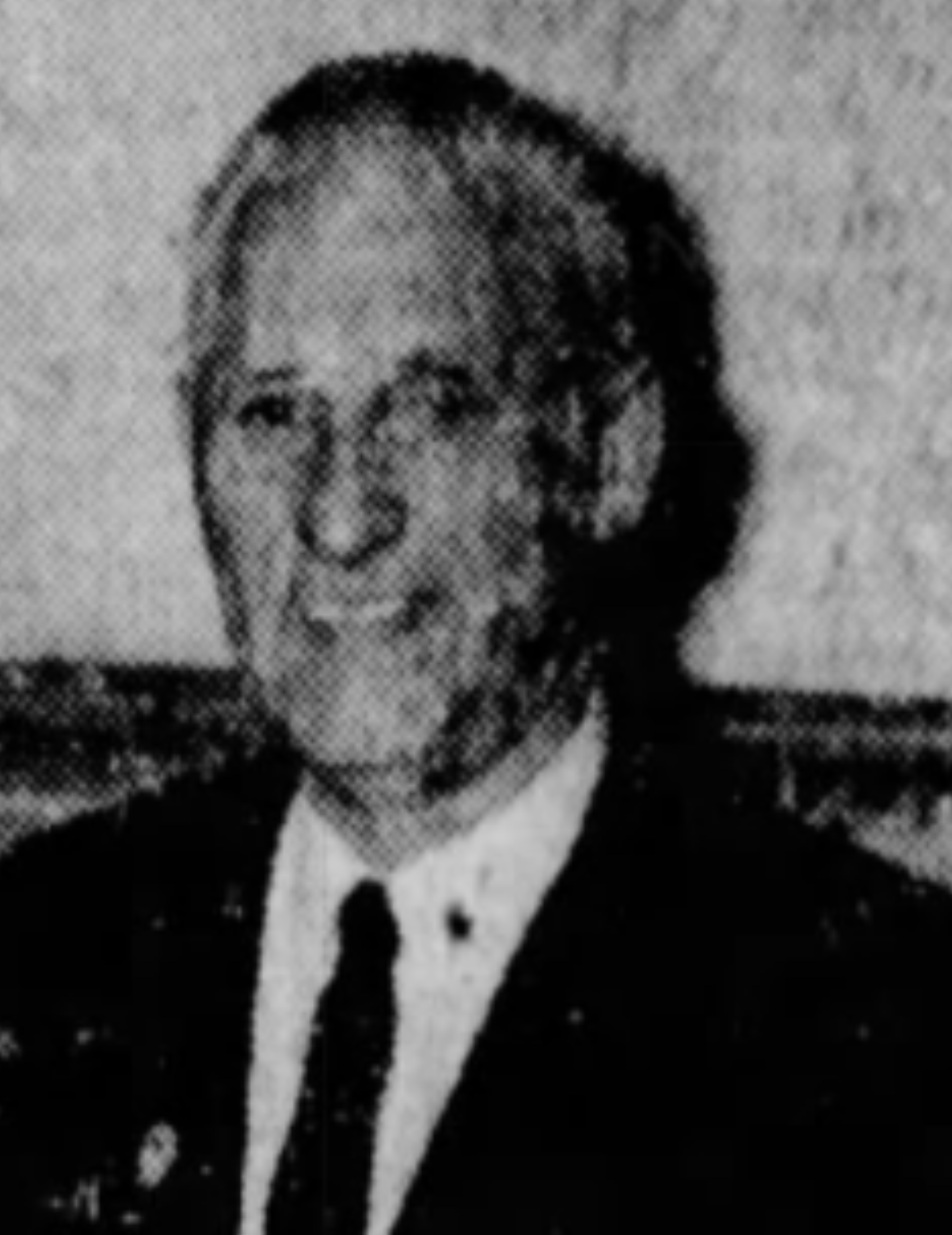
Nominee	F. Ray Keyser Jr.	Russell Niquette
Party	Republican	Democratic
Popular vote	92,861	71,755
Percentage	56.41%	43.58%
- Keyser: 50–60% 60–70% 70–80% 80–90% 90-100% Niquette: 50–60% 60–70% 70–80% 80–90% Tie: 50% No Vote/Data
Governor before election
Robert Stafford
Republican
Elected Governor
F. Ray Keyser Jr.
Republican

The 1960 Vermont gubernatorial election took place on November 8, 1960. Incumbent Republican Robert Stafford did not run for re-election to a second term as Governor of Vermont. Republican candidate F. Ray Keyser Jr. defeated Democratic candidate Russell F. Niquette to succeed him.

This marks the last time in Vermont history that the elected Governor was of the same party as the outgoing Governor.

== Republican primary ==
=== Results ===
Republican primary results
Party	Candidate	Votes	%	±%
Republican	F. Ray Keyser Jr.	17,491	29.6	
Republican	Robert S. Babcock	16,762	28.4	
Republican	A. Luke Crispe	14,874	25.2	
Republican	W. Arthur Simpson	9,916	16.8	
Republican	Other	7	0.0	
Total votes		59,050	100.0	

== Democratic primary ==
=== Results ===
Democratic primary results
Party	Candidate	Votes	%	±%
Democratic	Russell F. Niquette	16,054	99.8	
Democratic	Other	35	0.2	
Total votes		16,089	100.0	

== General election ==
=== Results ===
1960 Vermont gubernatorial election
Party	Candidate	Votes	%	±%
Republican	F. Ray Keyser Jr.	92,861	56.41	
Democratic	Russell F. Niquette	71,755	43.58	
N/A	Other	16	0.01	
Total votes		164,632	100.0	
