= Wolcott (CDP), Vermont =

Census-designated place in Vermont, United States

Wolcott, Vermont
- Census-designated place
- Location in Vermont Location in the United States
- Coordinates: 44°32′51″N 72°27′42″W
- Country: United States
- State: Vermont
- County: Lamoille
- Town: Wolcott

Area
  - Total: 0.93 sq mi (2.41 km^{2})
  - Land: 0.89 sq mi (2.31 km^{2})
  - Water: 0.039 sq mi (0.10 km^{2})
- Elevation: 692 ft (211 m)
- Time zone: UTC−5 (Eastern (EST))
  - Summer (DST): UTC−4 (EDT)
- ZIP Code: 05680
- Area code: 802
- FIPS code: 50-85300
- GNIS feature ID: 2805711

2805711

Wolcott is a census-designated place (CDP) comprising the central community in the town of Wolcott, Lamoille County, Vermont, United States. The CDP was first drawn for the 2020 census.

== Geography ==
Wolcott village is in the southern part of the town of Wolcott, on both sides of the Lamoille River. Vermont Route 15 passes through the village, following the north side of the river. Route 15 leads west 8 miles (13 km) to Morrisville and southeast 6 miles (10 km) to Hardwick.

According to the United States Census Bureau, the Wolcott CDP has a total area of 0.93 square miles (2.4 km^{2}), of which 0.04 square miles (0.1 km^{2}), or 4.08%, are water.
