= George S. Brown (minister) =

American Methodist minister (1801–1886)

- Born: July 25, 1801; Newport, Rhode Island, U.S.
- Died: April 10, 1886 (aged 84); Glens Falls, New York, U.S.
- Education: Cazenovia Seminary
- Occupations: Minister, evangelist, stonemason

George S. Brown (July 25, 1801 – April 10, 1886) was the first African American pastor in the Troy Annual Conference of the Methodist Episcopal Church. He was Vermont's first Black Methodist pastor and the third Black minister overall to serve in the state, following Congregationalists Lemuel Haynes and Alexander Twilight. He organized a white congregation in Wolcott, Vermont, in 1855 and 1856 and raised a church.

== Biography ==
Brown was born a free man in Newport, Rhode Island, to Amos and Hannah (Smith) Brown. He spent his twenties drinking, carousing, and earning a living as a traveling musician before converting to Baptism and then to the Methodist Episcopal Church in the late 1820s in Kingsbury, New York. Preachers who inspired him included Lorenzo Dow and William Ryder. He received a verbal license to exhort from the Rev. T. Fields in 1830, a formal license to exhort from the Washington Circuit Quarterly Conference in April 1831, and a license to preach on July 27, 1833. During this period, Brown began to support himself by building stone walls, specializing in dry-stacking, a technique in which stones are laid without the use of mortar, as well as the stone Beach Schoolhouse. The papers reported that he preached in Ferrisburgh, Vermont, in the summer of 1834. He studied at Cazenovia Seminary and sailed to Liberia to serve as a teacher and missionary on October 15, 1836.

Ordained an elder at John Street Methodist Church on March 26, 1838, Brown returned to Liberia and became a full member of the Liberia Annual Conference in February 1839. However, he clashed with the church authorities in Liberia over his holiness preaching and plans to extend his mission into the interior. Expelled from the church, he left Africa permanently in 1844. Fellow missionary John Seys, a white man, wrote numerous letters fiercely opposing Brown's return to the church, prompting Brown to sue Seys for slander in 1846. In August 1848, Seys agreed to pay Brown $150. Brown published his Journal in 1849, defending his life of service.

In 1851, Henry Boardman Taylor, an elder of the Troy Annual Conference, welcomed Brown back into the church and arranged to have Brown's preaching credentials restored in 1853. Brown was assigned to the Berkshire circuit and in late 1854 arrived in Wolcott, Vermont, to serve as a pastor for the small Methodist community there. On April 29, 1856, the congregation voted to build a church. Minutes recorded that Brown oversaw construction and appointed six white men to serve as trustees for the new building. He served informally as Wolcott's preacher-in-charge until the end of 1857 and preached in nearby towns, including Morristown and Morrisville. The congregation grew under his ministry, though the church technically did not admit African Americans to full clerical appointments. Wolcott was the only white Methodist congregation in the U.S. that was organized and presided over by an African American.

In 1863, Brown traveled to Jackson, Michigan, to build a stone wall on Dwight Merriman's farm, now the Ella Sharp Museum. The half-mile-long wall took him and four assistants two years to build. In 1869, the Michigan State Agricultural Society praised the wall's "artistic and engineering" design. In 1866, Brown returned to Glens Falls and continued to preach in the region for the rest of his life. In February 1886, he fell on the ice and lingered for two months until dying on April 10. He was interred at the Quaker cemetery in Glens Falls. The church that Brown organized at Wolcott was designated by a Vermont state historical marker in 2011 and was listed on the Vermont African American Heritage Trail in 2015 and listed on the Vermont State Register of Historic Places in 2018.

== Personal life ==
Brown married twice. His first wife, Nancy Wilson, daughter of one of the other Black preachers in Liberia, died seven months after their March 1839 marriage. He subsequently married Harriet Ann Harper in January 1841 and had one daughter, Hannah Ann, who died of whooping cough in 1843. Brown returned to America without his wife, who died in Liberia in March 1855.

== Publications ==
- Brown, George S. (1849). Brown’s Abridged Journal, Containing a Brief Account of the Life, Trials and Travels of Geo. S. Brown, Six Years a Missionary in Liberia, West Africa: A Miracle of God’s Grace. Troy, NY: Press of Prescott & Wilson.
