= 71st Infantry Regiment (United States) =

- Active: 1918
- Country: United States
- Branch: Infantry Branch (United States)
- Role: Infantry
- Size: Regiment
- Motto: None
- Colors: Blue

The 71st Infantry Regiment was a Regular infantry regiment in the United States Army active briefly during 1918–1919.

The regiment was constituted 9 July 1918 in the Regular Army as the 71st Infantry and assigned to the 11th Infantry Division. Organized August 1918 at Camp Meade, Maryland from personnel of the 17th Infantry, it was relieved from the 11th Division and demobilized on 3 February 1919 at Camp Meade.

This regiment should not be confused with the 71st Infantry Regiment of the New York State Guard.

== See also ==
- 71st New York Infantry
