= Ernest W. Dunklee =

American politician

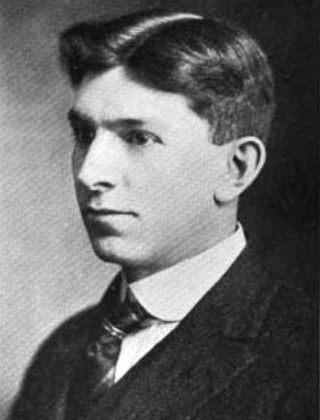

Member of the Vermont House of Representatives
- In office 1919–1921
- In office 1923–1925
- In office 1933–1937

Member of the Vermont State Senate
- In office 1925–1927
- In office 1939–1941

President of the Vermont State Senate
- In office 1937–1939

Personal details
- Born: November 29, 1890 Vernon, Vermont, U.S.
- Died: October 25, 1974 (aged 83) Vernon, Vermont
- Resting place: Tyler Cemetery, Vernon
- Party: Republican
- Occupation: Farmer, politician

Ernest W. Dunklee (November 29, 1890 – October 25, 1974) was a Vermont farmer and politician who served as President of the Vermont State Senate.

== Biography ==
Ernest Walter Dunklee was born in Vernon, Vermont on November 29, 1890. He attended school in Vernon and graduated from Mount Hermon Boys' School, afterwards operating a farm in Vernon. In 1904 he served as a page in the Vermont Senate.

A Republican, Dunklee served in local offices including town lister.

Dunklee served four terms in the Vermont House of Representatives: 1919 to 1921, 1923 to 1925, and 1933 to 1937. From 1925 to 1927 Dunklee served in the Vermont Senate.

Dunklee was again elected to the Vermont Senate in 1936. He served two terms, 1937 to 1941. From 1937 to 1939 he served as Senate President.

Dunklee died in Vernon on October 25, 1974. He is buried in Vernon's Tyler Cemetery.

Political offices
Preceded by William H. Wills	President pro tempore of the Vermont State Senate; 1937–1939	Succeeded by Mortimer R. Proctor
