= Clifton G. Parker =

American lawyer

President of the Vermont Bar Association
- In office 1959–1960
- Preceded by: Sterry R. Waterman
- Succeeded by: Luke A. Crispe

11th Vermont Attorney General
- In office 1947–1952
- Governor: Ernest W. Gibson Jr. Harold J. Arthur; Lee E. Emerson
- Preceded by: Alban J. Parker
- Succeeded by: F. Elliott Barber Jr.

State's Attorney of Lamoille County, Vermont
- In office 1936–1941
- Preceded by: Benjamin N. Hulburd
- Succeeded by: George A. King

Personal details
- Born: October 2, 1906 Wolcott, Vermont, US
- Died: April 19, 1988 (aged 81) Burlington, Vermont, US
- Resting place: Pleasant View Cemetery, Morrisville, Vermont, US
- Party: Republican
- Spouse: Florence Simmons (m. 1926)
- Children: 6
- Education: Hardwick Academy, Hardwick, Vermont, US
- Profession: Attorney

Clifton G. Parker (October 2, 1906 – April 19, 1988) was a Vermont attorney and politician who served as Vermont Attorney General for three terms.

== Biography ==
Clifton Goodrich Parker was born in Wolcott, Vermont on October 2, 1906, the son of H. Alton and Katie (Goodrich) Parker. He graduated from Hardwick Academy, and became a clerk for a local judge. He then studied law at the office of attorney James Campbell in St. Johnsbury, and attained admission to the bar in 1935. He practiced law in Morrisville, initially as the partner of Frederick G. Fleetwood, and later as a sole practitioner.

A Republican, Parker served as state's attorney of Lamoille County from 1936 to 1941.

In 1939, he was appointed first assistant clerk of the Vermont House of Representatives, and he served until 1941. In 1943 he was elected Clerk of the House as the replacement for Harold J. Arthur during Arthur's military service for World War II. Parker served as Clerk until 1947, when he was succeeded by Arthur.

In December 1941 he accepted Alban J. Parker's (no relation) appointment as Vermont's deputy attorney general, and he served until the end of Parker's term in 1947. In 1946, Clifton Parker was the successful Republican nominee to succeed Alban Parker. He was reelected in 1948 and 1950, and served from 1947 until resigning effective December 31, 1952. He was succeeded by F. Elliott Barber Jr., who won the 1952 election for the term beginning in January 1953; the Governor of Vermont appointed Barber to fill the vacancy caused by Parker's resignation.

He was active in the Vermont Bar Association, and served as its president from 1959 to 1960. In addition, he was a member of the state Board of Bar Examiners for several years. Parker was also active in local government for both Morrisville and Morristown, including serving on the water and power commission, town attorney, and town meeting moderator.

Parker was an amateur radio operator and a licensed boat captain; during World War II he invented a navigational device which was used by the United States Navy, and he also designed several railroad radio communication systems.

Parker died in Burlington on April 19, 1988. He was buried at Pleasant View Cemetery in Morrisville.

== Family ==
In 1926, Parker was married to Florence Simmons, and they were the parents of six children – Dee, Robert, Charlotte, Arlyn, Carolyn, and William.

== Sources ==
=== Books ===
- Vermont Legislative Directory. Montpelier, VT: Vermont Secretary of State. 1951. p. 674.

=== Newspapers ===
- "Parker Named Ass't House Clerk". The Burlington Free Press. Burlington, Vermont. January 11, 1939. p. 4.
- "Clifton Parker is Named Deputy Attorney General". The Burlington Free Press. Burlington, Vermont. December 5, 1941. p. 2.
- "Asa S. Bloomer Elected Speaker of the House". The Burlington Free Press. Burlington, Vermont. January 7, 1943. pp. 1, 13.
- "Clifton Parker Today Becomes Attorney General". The Burlington Free Press. Burlington, Vermont. Vermont Press Bureau. February 1, 1947. p. 2.
- "State's Attorney Deshaw Candidate to Succeed Parker as Atty. General". The Burlington Free Press. Burlington, Vermont. March 31, 1952. p. 9.
- "Parker Resigns Attorney-General Post as of Dec. 31; Elliott Barber Jr. Named to Office". The Burlington Free Press. Burlington, Vermont. December 27, 1952. p. 2.
- "It's Official Now: GOP Slate Victors in State Election". The Burlington Free Press. Burlington, Vermont. Vermont Press Bureau. January 5, 1953. p. 5.
- "Obituary, Clifton Parker". The Burlington Free Press. Burlington, Vermont. April 21, 1988. p. 18.
- "Obituary, Florence Simmons Parker". The Burlington Free Press. Burlington, Vermont. February 2, 1989. p. 10.

=== Internet ===
- "List of Clerks of the Vermont House of Representatives". Montpelier, VT: Clerk of the Vermont House of Representatives.
- "Past Presidents of the Vermont Bar Association" (PDF). vtbar.org. Vermont Bar Association. 2014. p. 1. Archived from the original (PDF) on 2015-01-18.
- "Vermont Death Records, 1909-2008, Entry for Clifton Goodrich Parker". Ancestry.com. Lehi, Utah: Ancestry.com, LLC. 1988.

Party political offices
Preceded by Alban J. Parker	Republican nominee for Vermont Attorney General; 1946, 1948, 1950	Succeeded by F. Elliott Barber Jr.
Political offices
Preceded by Alban J. Parker	Vermont Attorney General; 1947–1952	Succeeded by F. Elliott Barber, Jr.
