= Mortimer R. Proctor =

American politician

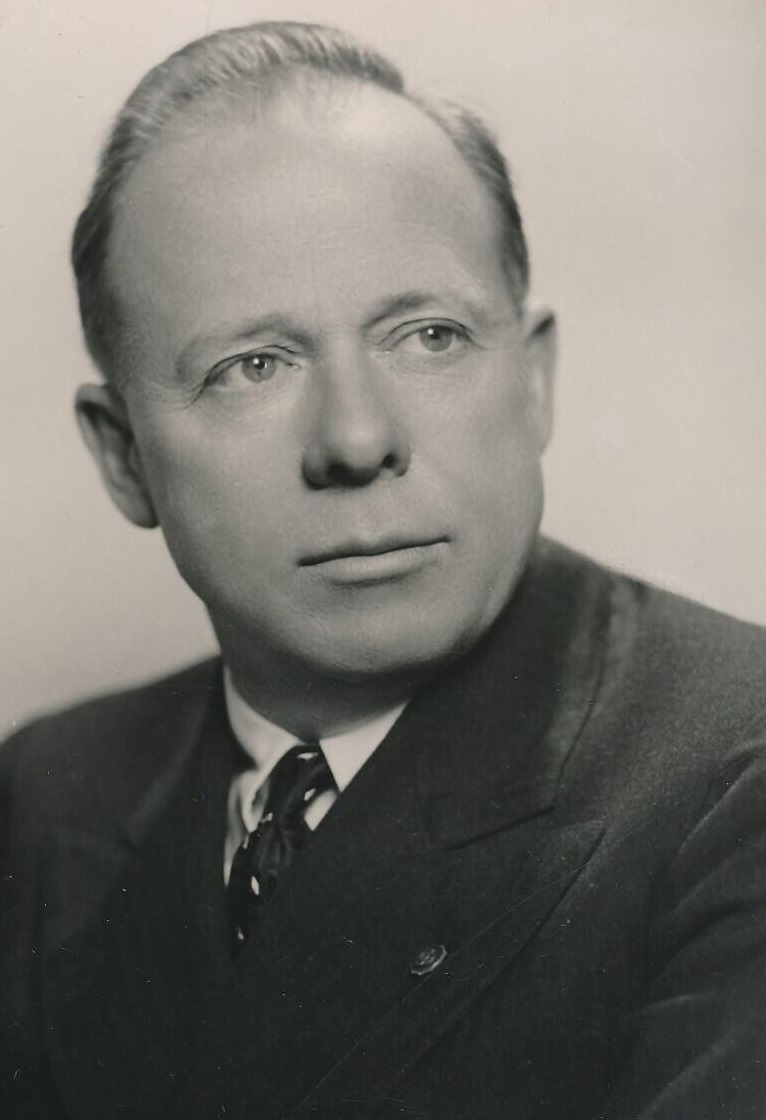

66th Governor of Vermont
- In office January 4, 1945 – January 9, 1947
- Lieutenant: Lee E. Emerson
- Preceded by: William H. Wills
- Succeeded by: Ernest William Gibson Jr.

62nd Lieutenant Governor of Vermont
- In office January 9, 1941 – January 4, 1945
- Governor: William H. Wills
- Preceded by: William H. Wills
- Succeeded by: Lee E. Emerson

President pro tempore of the Vermont Senate
- In office 1939–1941
- Preceded by: Ernest W. Dunklee
- Succeeded by: Joseph H. Denny

Member of the Vermont Senate from Rutland County
- In office 1939–1941 Serving with Henry H. Branchaud; Henry B. Carpenter; Willard H. Smith
- Preceded by: Ernest E. Aldrich; William G. Gipson; Leigh Hunt; Richard T. Jones
- Succeeded by: Henry B. Carpenter; Paul F. Douglass; Arthur C. Grover; Hollis I. Loveland

Speaker of the Vermont House of Representatives
- In office 1937–1939
- Preceded by: Ernest E. Moore
- Succeeded by: Oscar L. Shepard

Member of the Vermont House of Representatives from Proctor
- In office 1933–1939
- Preceded by: Guy H. Boyce
- Succeeded by: Wallace M. Fay

Personal details
- Born: May 30, 1889 Proctor, Vermont, U.S.
- Died: April 28, 1968 (aged 78) Proctor, Vermont, U.S.
- Party: Republican
- Spouse(s): Margaret Chisholm (m. 1917; ann. 1924) Dorothy Chisholm (m. 1924; div. 1931) Lillian Washburn Bryan (m. 1942; died 1961) Geraldine Gates (m. 1966)
- Children: Mortimer Robinson Proctor, Jr.
- Education: Yale University
- Profession: President and Chairman of the Board, Vermont Marble Company

Military service
- Allegiance: United States
- Branch/service: United States Army
- Years of service: 1917-1919
- Rank: Second Lieutenant
- Unit: 71st Infantry Regiment
- Battles/wars: World War I

Mortimer Robinson Proctor (May 30, 1889 – April 28, 1968) was an American politician from Vermont. He served as the 62nd lieutenant governor of Vermont from 1941 to 1945, and as the 66th governor of Vermont from 1945 to 1947.

== Biography ==
Proctor was born in Proctor, Vermont, to Fletcher Dutton Proctor, the fifty-first Governor of Vermont, and Minnie Euretta Robinson Proctor. He studied at The Hill School. He graduated from Yale University in 1912. He married first Margaret Cynthia Chisholm on May 30, 1916, in Proctor. He married second Dorothy Chisholm, the sister of his first wife, on March 8, 1924. They divorced. He married third Lillian Washburn Bryan on November 14, 1942, in Proctor. Lillian died in 1961. At the time of his death he was married to Geraldine Gates Proctor.

== Career ==
Proctor was president of the Village of Proctor in 1930, and chairman of the Town of Proctor Republican Committee in 1932. He spent his entire career in the private sector as an executive of the Vermont Marble Company, the family-owned business. He was president from 1952 to 1958 and chairman from 1958 to 1967.

Proctor enlisted in the US Army for World War I in 1917, completed officer training and was commissioned as a second lieutenant in the 71st Regiment, serving in France throughout the war.

Proctor represented the town of Proctor, Vermont in the Vermont House of Representatives from 1933 to 1939 and was Speaker of the Vermont House of Representatives from 1937 to 1939. He served in the Vermont State Senate from 1939 to 1941, and was Senate President for his entire term.

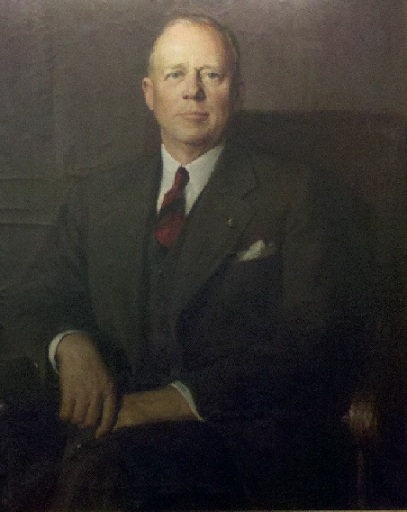
Vermont State House portrait

Proctor was Lieutenant Governor of Vermont from 1941 to 1945. He was elected Governor of Vermont in 1944 and served from 1945 to 1947. During his tenure, the state debt was reduced, state aid to education, old age assistance payments, and teacher's minimum salaries were increased.

Proctor ran for reelection in 1946 but lost the Republican Primary to Ernest W. Gibson Jr., the first governor of Vermont to be denied renomination. He returned to private business and established the Mortimer R. Proctor Trust which supports non profit activities in arts, culture, education, and religion in Proctor, Vermont.

== Death and legacy ==
Proctor died on April 28, 1968, and is interred at South Street Cemetery, Proctor, Vermont.

Proctor was the grandson of Redfield Proctor, the son of Fletcher D. Proctor, and the nephew of Redfield Proctor Jr., who all previously served as Governor of Vermont. He had one son, Mortimer Robinson Proctor Jr. (1916–1977). He was a president of the Green Mountain Club which built and maintains the Long Trail, America's first long-distance hiking trail.

He provided funds for the state of Vermont to build a steel Aermotor LS-40 fire tower on the summit of Pico Peak.

== Published works ==
- "Pleasant Memories From Public Life, 1932-1952"
- "Vermont, The Unspoiled Land"

== See also ==
- List of members of the American Legion

Party political offices
Preceded by William Henry Wills	Republican nominee for Lieutenant Governor of Vermont; 1940, 1942	Succeeded by Lee E. Emerson
Preceded by William Henry Wills	Republican nominee for Governor of Vermont; 1944	Succeeded by Ernest W. Gibson Jr.
Political offices
Preceded by Ernest E. Moore	Speaker of the Vermont House of Representatives; 1937 – 1939	Succeeded by Oscar L. Shepard
Preceded by Ernest W. Dunklee	President pro tempore of the Vermont State Senate; 1939 – 1941	Succeeded by Joseph H. Denny
Preceded by William H. Wills	Lieutenant Governor of Vermont; 1941 – 1945	Succeeded by Lee E. Emerson
Preceded by William H. Wills	Governor of Vermont; 1945–1947	Succeeded by Ernest W. Gibson Jr.
