= Oscar L. Shepard =

American politician

Chairman of the Vermont Public Service Commission
- In office 1953–1959
- Preceded by: N. Henry Press
- Succeeded by: Charles R. Ross

Speaker of the Vermont House of Representatives
- In office 1939–1941
- Preceded by: Mortimer R. Proctor
- Succeeded by: Lee E. Emerson

Member of the Vermont House of Representatives from Hardwick
- In office 1937–1941
- Preceded by: Martin K. Judd
- Succeeded by: Melvin G. Morse

State's Attorney of Caledonia County, Vermont
- In office 1925–1933
- Preceded by: Jutten A. Longmoore
- Succeeded by: Sterry R. Waterman

Personal details
- Born: March 24, 1894 Albany, Vermont, U.S.
- Died: November 23, 1980 (aged 86) Morrisville, Vermont, U.S.
- Resting place: Pleasant View Cemetery, Morrisville, Vermont, U.S.
- Party: Republican
- Spouse: Ethyl Harriet (Wilbur) Shepard (m. 1917)
- Children: 1
- Education: Lowell Commercial College, Lowell, Massachusetts
- Profession: Attorney

Military service
- Service: United States Army
- Years of service: 1918–1919
- Rank: Corporal
- Unit: Procurement Division, United States Army Ordnance Corps
- Wars: World War I

Oscar Leslie Shepard (March 24, 1894 – November 23, 1980) was a politician and lawyer in Hardwick, Vermont, who served as Speaker of the Vermont House of Representatives.

== Biography ==
Oscar Leslie Shepard was born in Albany, Vermont, on March 24, 1894, and was raised in Hardwick. Shepard graduated from Hardwick Academy and attended Lowell Commercial College in Lowell, Massachusetts. After his 1914 graduation, Shepard became employed by a Hardwick law firm.

He enlisted in the Army for World War I. Shepard served at the United States Department of War in Procurement Division of the Ordnance Corps from his February, 1918 enlistment until his January, 1919 discharge, and attained the rank of Corporal.

After returning from his military service Shepard studied law with his employer, attained admission to the bar, and became a lawyer in Hardwick. From 1925 to 1933 Shepard served as Caledonia County State's Attorney.

Shepard was a Hardwick Village Trustee from 1933 to 1952 and Town Meeting Moderator from 1934 to 1955.

In 1936 Shepard was elected to the Vermont House of Representatives and served two terms. He was Speaker from 1939 to 1941.

In 1940, Shepard was an unsuccessful candidate for lieutenant governor, losing the Republican primary to Mortimer R. Proctor. From 1941 to 1945 he served on the Vermont Banking Board. When Proctor became governor in 1945 he appointed Shepard as his executive assistant.

In the 1950s Shepard served as chairman of the Vermont Public Service Commission.

Shepard died in Morrisville, Vermont, aged 86, on November 23, 1980, and was buried in Morrisville's Pleasant View Cemetery.

Political offices
Preceded by Mortimer R. Proctor	Speaker of the Vermont House of Representatives; 1939–1941	Succeeded by Lee Earl Emerson
