= William Henry Wills (politician) =

American businessman and politician from Vermont

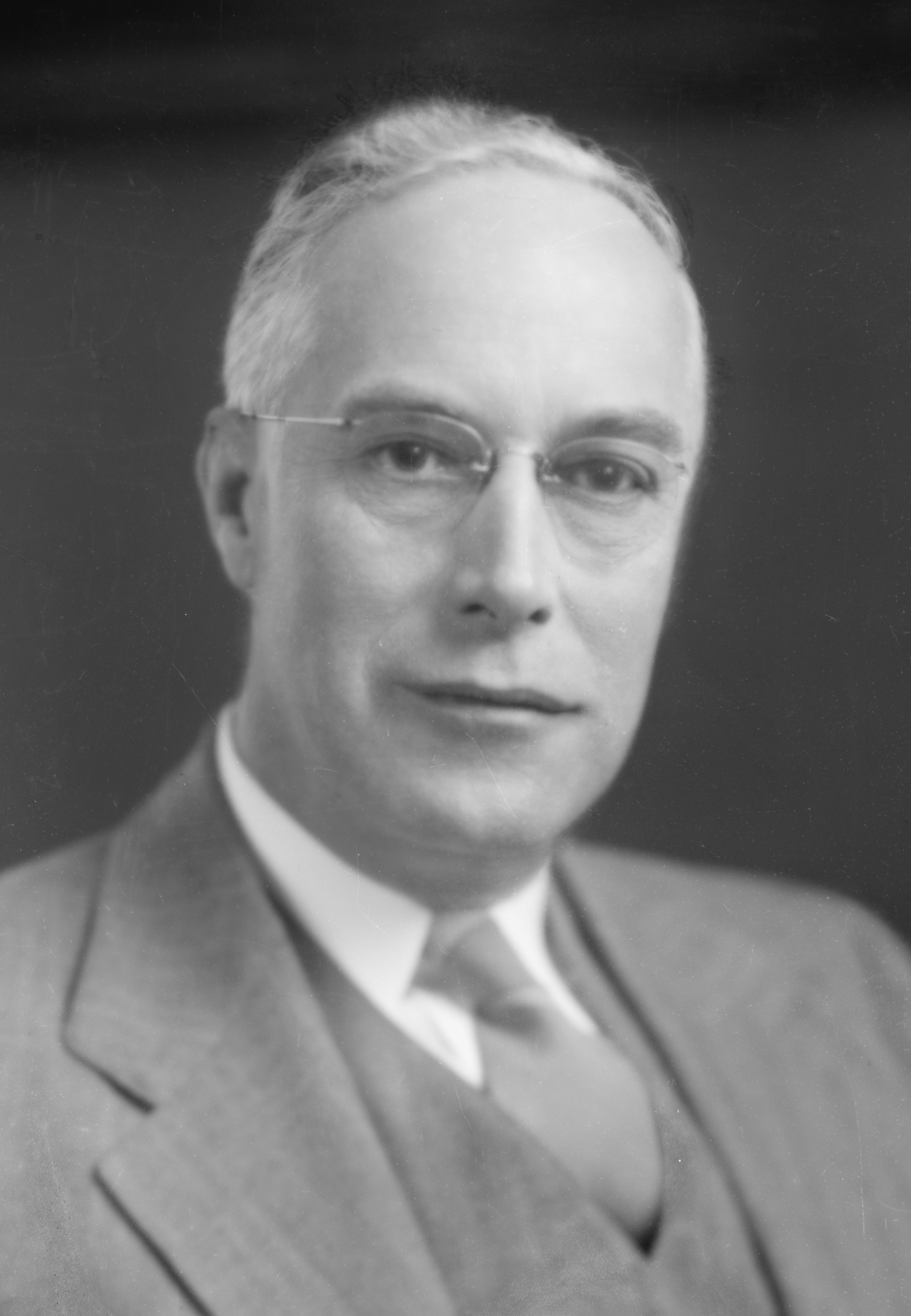
- William H. Wills in 1944

Member, Federal Communications Commission
- In office July 23, 1945 – March 6, 1946
- Preceded by: Norman S. Case
- Succeeded by: Rosel H. Hyde

65th Governor of Vermont
- In office January 9, 1941 – January 4, 1945
- Lieutenant: Mortimer R. Proctor
- Preceded by: George Aiken
- Succeeded by: Mortimer R. Proctor

61st Lieutenant Governor of Vermont
- In office January 7, 1937 – January 9, 1941
- Governor: George Aiken
- Preceded by: George Aiken
- Succeeded by: Mortimer R. Proctor

Member of the Vermont Senate from the Bennington County district
- In office January 9, 1935 – January 7, 1937 Serving with Harry C. Beebe
- Preceded by: Frank C. Archibald, Cebra Q. Graves
- Succeeded by: Leon M. Cole, Edward A. Tobin
- In office January 7, 1931 – January 4, 1933 Serving with Richard M. Campbell
- Preceded by: William B. Edgerton, Daniel F. Gardner
- Succeeded by: Frank C. Archibald, Cebra Q. Graves

Member of the Vermont House of Representatives from the Bennington district
- In office January 9, 1929 – January 7, 1931
- Preceded by: Cyrus S. Estes
- Succeeded by: Edward F. Horst

Personal details
- Born: October 26, 1882 Chicago, Illinois, U.S.
- Died: March 6, 1946 (aged 63) Brockton, Massachusetts, U.S.
- Resting place: Park Lawn Cemetery, Bennington, Vermont, U.S.
- Party: Republican
- Spouse: Hazel McLeod (m. 1914-1946, his death)
- Relations: James Henry Wills (father); Alzina Brown Wills (mother)
- Children: 1
- Occupation: Insurance agent, real estate broker, politician

William Henry Wills (October 26, 1882 – March 6, 1946) was an American politician from the U.S. state of Vermont. He was the 61st lieutenant governor of Vermont from 1937 to 1941 and the 65th governor of Vermont from 1941 to 1945. In 1944, Wills was a delegate to the Republican National Convention.

== Early life ==
Wills was born in Chicago, Illinois, where his family lived for the first ten years of his life. When his father, James Henry Wills, died, his mother Alzina moved to Vergennes, Vermont, to live near relatives, and he lived there for eight years. At eighteen, he moved to Bennington, where he worked at several occupations, including selling shoes. He was married to Hazel McLeod and they had one child.

== Career ==
Wills started an insurance company in 1915, and was also involved in other financial services. He got into electoral politics in the 1920s, winning election to the Vermont House of Representatives in 1928, representing Bennington; he won a Bennington County Senate seat in the following election (1930), and was chosen president pro tempore of that body. Wills chose to run for lieutenant governor in 1932, but lost the nomination to Charles Manley Smith. Returning to the Senate in the 1934 election, Wills was again elected president pro tempore of the Vermont State Senate. In 1936, Wills again ran for lieutenant governor, this time winning the election to succeed George Aiken (who was elected governor), and won again in 1938.

Wills was elected governor in 1940, succeeding Aiken, who chose to run for the United States Senate. He won again in 1942, but chose not to seek a third term, citing poor health. Among the policies he successfully championed as governor were the institution of a merit system for state employees and a minimum wage for teachers. He was succeeded by Lieutenant Governor Mortimer R. Proctor. By the time he left office, Wills had received honorary LL.D. degrees from Norwich University, Middlebury College and the University of Vermont. He was president of the board of trustees of the Episcopal Diocese of Vermont. He was also on the board of a number of other charities, and was a Freemason, an Elk, and an Odd Fellow. He was a delegate to the 1944 Republican National Convention.

Wills was nominated by President Harry Truman to replace Federal Communications Commission member Norman S. Case on June 13, 1945, for the seven-year term beginning July 1, 1945. He was confirmed on unanimous consent by the Senate on July 12, a few hours after a brief hearing before the Senate Interstate Commerce Committee. He took the oath of office on July 23, 1945.

== Death ==
Wills served until his death on March 6, 1946. He died while presiding over an FCC hearing in Brockton, Massachusetts. He is interred at Park Lawn Cemetery in Bennington.

Party political offices
Preceded by George Aiken	Republican nominee for Lieutenant Governor of Vermont; 1936, 1938	Succeeded by Mortimer R. Proctor
Preceded by George Aiken	Republican nominee for Governor of Vermont; 1940, 1942	Succeeded by Mortimer R. Proctor
Political offices
Preceded by Levi P. Smith	President pro tempore of the Vermont State Senate; 1931 – 1933	Succeeded by Charles B. Adams
Preceded by Charles B. Adams	President pro tempore of the Vermont State Senate; 1935 – 1937	Succeeded by Ernest W. Dunklee
Preceded by George Aiken	Lieutenant Governor of Vermont; 1937 –1941	Succeeded by Mortimer R. Proctor
Preceded by George Aiken	Governor of Vermont; 1941–1945	Succeeded by Mortimer R. Proctor
