= Herbert G. Barber =

American politician and lawyer

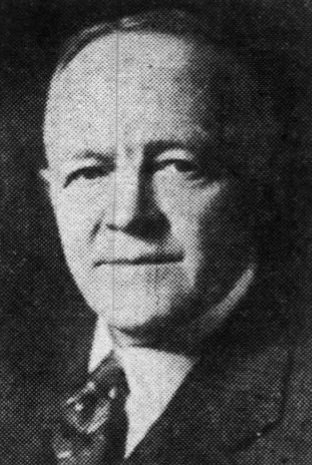
- Rutland Herald, May 11, 1940

Attorney General of Vermont
- In office December 1914 – January 1919
- Governor: Allen M. Fletcher; Charles W. Gates; Horace F. Graham
- Preceded by: Rufus E. Brown
- Succeeded by: Frank C. Archibald

Member of the Vermont Senate from Windham County
- In office 1912–1914 Serving with Frederick H. Babbitt
- Preceded by: Edwin P. Adams, Edgar M. Butler
- Succeeded by: Natt L. Divoll, Adelbert A. Dunklee

Member of the Vermont House of Representatives from Brattleboro
- In office 1935–1937
- Preceded by: Howard C. Rice
- Succeeded by: Howard C. Rice
- In office 1908–1910
- Preceded by: Ernest Willard Gibson
- Succeeded by: J. Gilbert Strafford

State's Attorney of Windham County, Vermont
- In office 1899–1900
- Preceded by: Charles Henry Robb
- Succeeded by: George A. Weston

Personal details
- Born: Herbert Goodell Barber; August 14, 1870 Wardsboro, Vermont, U.S.
- Died: October 5, 1947 (aged 77) Brattleboro, Vermont, U.S.
- Party: Republican
- Spouse: Florence Whittier (m. 1909)
- Children: 3
- Profession: Attorney

Herbert Goodell Barber (August 14, 1870 – October 5, 1947) was an American politician and lawyer. A Republican, he served in both chambers of the Vermont General Assembly and as Vermont Attorney General.

== Biography ==
Herbert G. Barber was born in Wardsboro, Vermont on August 14, 1870. He was educated in Wardsboro and Brattleboro, studied law at the Brattleboro firm of Eleazer L. Waterman and James Loren Martin, and was admitted to the bar in 1893. He practiced in Brattleboro, and established a firm with his brother Frank, H. G. and F. E. Barber. Both Barbers were active in politics as Republicans, and served in local offices including Justice of the Peace, and party positions including member of the Republican State Committee. In addition, Frank Barber served as state's attorney for Windham County from 1910 to 1912, and as judge of Brattleboro's municipal court.

Herbert Barber served as state's attorney from 1898 to 1900, a member of the Vermont House of Representatives from 1908 to 1910, and a member of the Vermont State Senate from 1912 to 1914.

In 1914, Barber ran successfully for Vermont Attorney General. Vermont's law changing the start of terms of office from December to January took effect in 1914, so Governor Allen M. Fletcher appointed Barber to serve for the month of December 1914, bridging the gap between the end of Rufus E. Brown's term in November 1914 and the start of Barber's in January 1915. Barber was reelected in 1916, and served from December 1914 to January 1919. He did not run for reelection in 1918. In 1935, Barber served another term in the Vermont House of Representatives.

Barber died in Brattleboro on October 5, 1947. He was buried at Meeting House Hill Cemetery in Brattleboro.

== Family ==
In 1909, Barber married Florence Whittier of Montpelier. They were the parents of three children: Wendell, Elizabeth, and Clarence.

== Sources ==
=== Books ===
- Fifield, James Clark (1918). The American Bar: Contemporary Lawyers of the United States and Canada. Minneapolis, MN: James C. Fifield Company. p. 670.

=== Internet ===
- Vermont Archives and Records Administration (2014). "Vermont General Election Results: Attorney General, 1906-2014" (PDF). www.sec.state.vt.us. Montpelier, VT: Office of the Vermont Secretary of State. pp. 1–2.

=== Newspapers ===
- "Wedding Announcement, Barber-Whittier". Vermont Watchman. Montpelier, VT. October 21, 1909. p. 1.
- "To Vermont Voters: Statement of Issues from Republican State Committee". Vermont Phoenix. Brattleboro, VT. August 19, 1910. p. 4.
- "The Local Caucuses". Vermont Phoenix. Brattleboro, VT. August 23, 1912. p. 2.
- "Barber's Appointment". Burlington Free Press. Burlington, VT. December 1, 1914. p. 5.
- "Barber Not to Run Again". Burlington Free Press. Burlington, VT. May 15, 1918. p. 10.
- "Herbert G. Barber, 77, Former Atty-Gen. for Vermont, Dies". Burlington Free Press. Burlington, VT. October 6, 1947. p. 10.
- "H. G. Barber Dies". Brattleboro Reformer. Brattleboro, VT. October 6, 1947. p. 1 – via Newspapers.com.

Party political offices
Preceded by Rufus E. Brown	Republican nominee for Vermont Attorney General; 1914, 1916	Succeeded by Frank C. Archibald
Political offices
Preceded by Rufus E. Brown	Vermont Attorney General; 1914–1919	Succeeded by Frank C. Archibald
