= Frank C. Archibald (Vermont politician) =

American politician

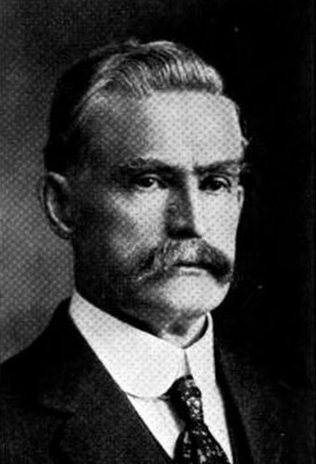

7th Vermont Attorney General
- In office 1918–1925
- Governor: Percival W. Clement; James Hartness; Redfield Proctor Jr.
- Preceded by: Herbert G. Barber
- Succeeded by: J. Ward Carver

Member of the Vermont Senate from Bennington County
- In office 1932–1935 Serving with Cebra Q. Graves
- Preceded by: Richard M. Campbell
- Succeeded by: William Henry Wills; Harry C. Beebe
- In office 1910–1912 Serving with Henry Theodore Cushman
- Preceded by: Edward Church Orvis; Everett Eli Potter
- Succeeded by: James Kendrick Batchelder; Norman L. Mattison

Member of the Vermont House of Representatives from Manchester
- In office 1904–1908
- Preceded by: Joseph W. Fowler
- Succeeded by: J. Henry Hicks

Personal details
- Born: December 31, 1857 Exeter, New Hampshire, US
- Died: April 9, 1935 (aged 77) Manchester, Vermont, US
- Resting place: Greenwood Cemetery, Bristol, Vermont
- Party: Republican
- Spouse(s): Elizabeth A. Phalen (? – 1908; her death] Stella May Chase (m. 1912–1914; divorced)
- Profession: Attorney

Frank C. Archibald (December 31, 1857 – April 9, 1935) was a Vermont attorney and politician who served as Vermont Attorney General for six years.

== Biography ==
Frank Carey Archibald was born in Exeter, New Hampshire on December 31, 1857, the son of Reverend Thomas H. (1821-1900) and Susan W. (Tuck) Archibald (1823-1899). He graduated from Middlebury Union High School in 1876, and later graduated from the Vermont Academy. He subsequently studied law, was admitted to the bar in 1886, and became an attorney in Manchester, Vermont in 1886. He resided in Manchester for the rest of his life, and was the moderator of the Manchester town meeting for nearly 50 years.

Active in politics as a Republican, Archibald served as state's attorney of Bennington County from 1892 to 1894. He served in the Vermont House of Representatives from 1904 to 1908, and the Vermont Senate from 1910 to 1912. In 1912 he was an unsuccessful candidate for the Republican nomination for attorney general. He served again as Bennington County's state's attorney from 1914 to 1918.

In 1918, Archibald was elected Vermont Attorney General. He was reelected in 1920, 1922, and 1924, and served from January 1919 until resigning in May 1925.

In 1920, Archibald was the temporary chairman and keynote speaker at the Vermont Republican State Convention.

After leaving office, Archibald resumed practicing law in Manchester, Vermont. He served again in the Vermont Senate from 1933 to 1935. He died in Manchester on April 9, 1935, and was buried at Greenwood Cemetery in Bristol, Vermont.

== Family ==
Archibald was married first to Elizabeth A "Lizzie" Phalen, who died in 1908. Archibald was the stepfather of his wife's two daughters, Eva and Olivia. On October 30, 1912, Archibald married Stella May Chase of Burlington, Vermont. They divorced in 1914, and had no children. Stella May Chase remarried in 1915.

== Sources ==
=== Books ===
- Bigelow, Walter J. (1919). Vermont, Its Government 1919-1920. Montpelier, VT: Historical Publishing Company. p. 23.
- Dodge, Prentiss C. (1912). Encyclopedia of Vermont Biography. Brattleboro, VT: Ullery Publishing Company. p. 101.

=== Internet ===
- Vermont Archives and Records Administration (2014). "Vermont General Election Results: Attorney General, 1906-2014" (PDF). www.sec.state.vt.us/. Montpelier, VT: Office of the Vermont Secretary of State. pp. 2–3. Archived from the original (PDF) on 2015-09-06.

=== Newspapers ===
- "Fletcher and Howe Republican Ticket: Brown Defeats Archibald for Attorney General and Deavitt Wins from Scott for Treasurer". Burlington Free Press. Burlington, VT. July 4, 1912. p. 14.
- "Archibald-Chase: Manchester Lawyer Came to Burlington for Bride". Burlington Free Press. Burlington, VT. October 31, 1912. p. 7.
- "Home Wedding: Charles E. Thompson and Miss Stella May Chase Married Saturday". Burlington Free Press. Burlington, VT. September 13, 1915. p. 8.
- "Republican State Convention Today". Burlington Free Press. Burlington, VT. September 28, 1920. p. 9.
- "Former Vermont Atty. Gen. Dies". North Adams Transcript. North Adams, MA. Associated Press. April 9, 1935. p. 3.
- "Frank Archibald Buried in Bristol". Bristol Herald. Bristol, VT. April 12, 1935. p. 1 – via newspapers.com.

Party political offices
Preceded by Herbert G. Barber	Republican nominee for Vermont Attorney General; 1918, 1920, 1922, 1924	Succeeded by J. Ward Carver
Political offices
Preceded by Herbert G. Barber	Vermont Attorney General; 1919–1925	Succeeded by J. Ward Carver
