= Waterman (surname) =

Waterman is a surname. Notable people with the surname include:

== Persons ==
- Alan T. Waterman (1892–1967), American physicist
- Alma May Waterman (1893–1977), American botanist
- Andrew Waterman (disambiguation), multiple people
- Boy Waterman (born 1984), Dutch footballer
- Carol Lee Scott (1942–2017), birth name Carol Waterman, British actress
- Charles Waterman (disambiguation), multiple people
- Cecilio Waterman (born 1991), Panamanian footballer
- Dennis Waterman (disambiguation), multiple people
- Don Waterman (born 1950), NASCAR Cup Series driver
- Clyde Waterman (fl. early/mid 20th C), manager of Ozone Theatres, Australian cinema chain, son of Hugh and brother of Ewen
- Sir Ewen McIntyre Waterman (1901–1982), Australian businessman in the cinema and wool industries, son of Hugh and brother of Clyde
- Fanny Waterman (1920–2020), British pianist and piano teacher
- Hannah Waterman (born 1975), British actress
- Hazel Wood Waterman (1865–1948), American architect
- Hugh Waterman (fl. early 20th C), Australian cinema entrepreneur, owner of Ozone Theatres, father of Clyde and Ewen
- Joel Waterman (born 1996), Canadian soccer player
- John Waterman (born 1952), American politician
- Jonathan Waterman (born 1956), American writer and adventurer
- Laura Waterman Wittstock (1937–2021), Seneca journalist, writer and radio producer
- Lewis Waterman (1837–1901), American inventor and businessman
- Louise Waterman, maiden name of Louise Waterman Wise (1874–1947), American social worker and artist
- Michael Waterman (born 1942), American computational biologist
- Nixon Waterman (1859–1944), American poet and newspaper writer
- Pete Waterman (born 1947), English record producer, songwriter and businessman
- Peter C. Waterman (1928–2012), American mathematician and physicist
- Peter Waterman (cricketer) (born 1961), English cricketer
- Robert Waterman (disambiguation), multiple people
- Ron Waterman (born 1965), American mixed martial artist and professional wrestler
- Sterry R. Waterman (1901–1984), American judge
- Steve Waterman (disambiguation), multiple people
- Thomas Waterman (disambiguation), multiple people
- Waldo Waterman (1894–1976), American inventor and aviation pioneer
- William Waterman (disambiguation), multiple people
- Zenas Waterman, Nova Scotian farmer and politician

== Fictional characters ==
- Adam Waterman, alter-ego of Golden Age Aquaman

== See also ==
- Justice Waterman (disambiguation) or Judge Waterman
- Senator Waterman (disambiguation)
- Waterman (disambiguation)
