= Waterman =

Waterman may refer to:

== People ==
- Waterman (occupation), a river worker who transferred passengers across and along the city centre rivers in Britain
- The Chesapeake Bay term for commercial fishermen, particularly those who seek oysters and the blue crab
- Waterman (surname)
- Justice Waterman (disambiguation)
- Senator Waterman (disambiguation)

== Places ==
- 1822 Waterman, a stony asteroid from the inner regions of the asteroid belt.
- Waterman (crater), a lunar impact crater
- Waterman, Illinois, USA; a village
- Waterman Place, Waterman Place-Kingsbury Place-Washington Terrace Historic District, St. Louis, Missouri, USA; NRHP-listed
- Waterman, Oregon, USA; a former town amid cattle ranches
- Waterman Covered Bridge, Johnson, Vermont, USA; NRHP-listed
- Waterman, Washington, USA
- Waterman, Western Australia, Australia; now known as Watermans Bay, Western Australia
- Waterman Building (disambiguation)
- Waterman House (disambiguation)

== Media, arts, entertainment ==
- Waterman (film), a documentary about the life of Hawaiian athlete Duke Kahanamoku
- The Water Man (film), a 2020 American drama film
- Water Man (novel), a 1993 novel by Roger McDonald
- Waterman (web series), an online animated feature
- "Waterman" (song), the Eurovision Song Contest 1970 song by Hearts of Soul
- "The Water Man", an 1826 Slovene ballad

== Brands, companies, organizations, groups ==
- Waterman pens, a luxury pen company
- Waterman Philéas, a series of writing pens
- Waterman Steamship Corporation

== Other uses ==
- Alan T. Waterman Award, a prize awarded by the US National Science Foundation
- Smith–Waterman algorithm
- Waterman butterfly projection
- USS Waterman, a 1943 Cannon-class destroyer escort

== See also ==
- Watermans (disambiguation), including "Waterman's"
- Wassermann (disambiguation)
