= Waterman Building =

Waterman Building may refer to:

- The Waterman Building (Chicago), Illinois, USA; a historic building on State Street in Chicago's Loop
- The Waterman–Smith Building, a high-rise in Mobile, Alabama, USA
- The first permanent home for the Rhode Island School of Design in College Hill, Providence, Rhode Island, USA

== See also ==
- Waterman House (disambiguation)
- Waterman (disambiguation)
