= Waterman House =

Waterman House may refer to:

in the United Kingdom

- Waterman House, London

in the United States

- Waterman-Archer House, Fayetteville, Arkansas, listed on the National Register of Historic Places (NRHP)
- Long-Waterman House, San Diego, California, NRHP-listed in San Diego County
- Ball-Waterman House, Davenport, Iowa, NRHP-listed
- Wallace W. Waterman Sod House, Big Springs, Nebraska, NRHP-listed
- Waterman-Gramps House, Nelliston, New York, NRHP-listed
- William Waterman House, Coventry, Rhode Island, NRHP-listed
- Waterman-Winsor Farm, Smithfield, Rhode Island, NRHP-listed
- John Waterman Arnold House, Warwick, Rhode Island, NRHP-listed
- S.H. Waterman House, Oshkosh, WI, NRHP-listed in Winnebago County

== See also ==
- Waterman Tavern, Coventry, Rhode Island, NRHP-listed
- John Waterman Arnold House, Warwick, Rhode Island, NRHP-listed
- John and Mary Waterman Jarves House, Sandwich, Massachusetts, NRHP-listed
- Waterman Place-Kingsbury Place-Washington Terrace Historic District, St. Louis, Missouri, NRHP-listed
- Waterman Service Building, Cleveland, Ohio, NRHP-listed
- Waterman Covered Bridge, Johnson, Vermont, NRHP-listed
- Waterman (surname)
- Waterman Building (disambiguation)
- Waterman (disambiguation)
