= 1946 United States Senate election in Vermont =

- November 5, 1946
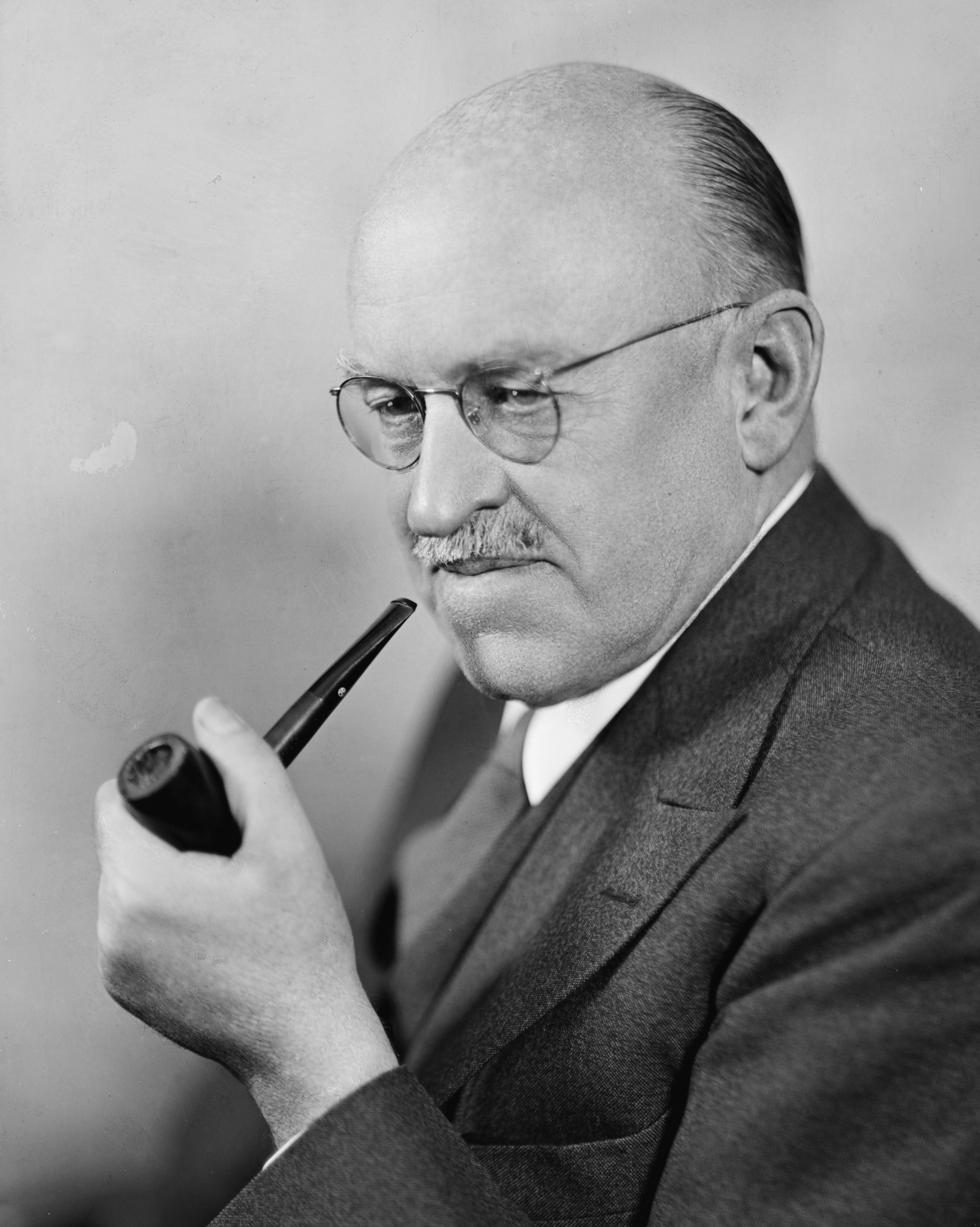

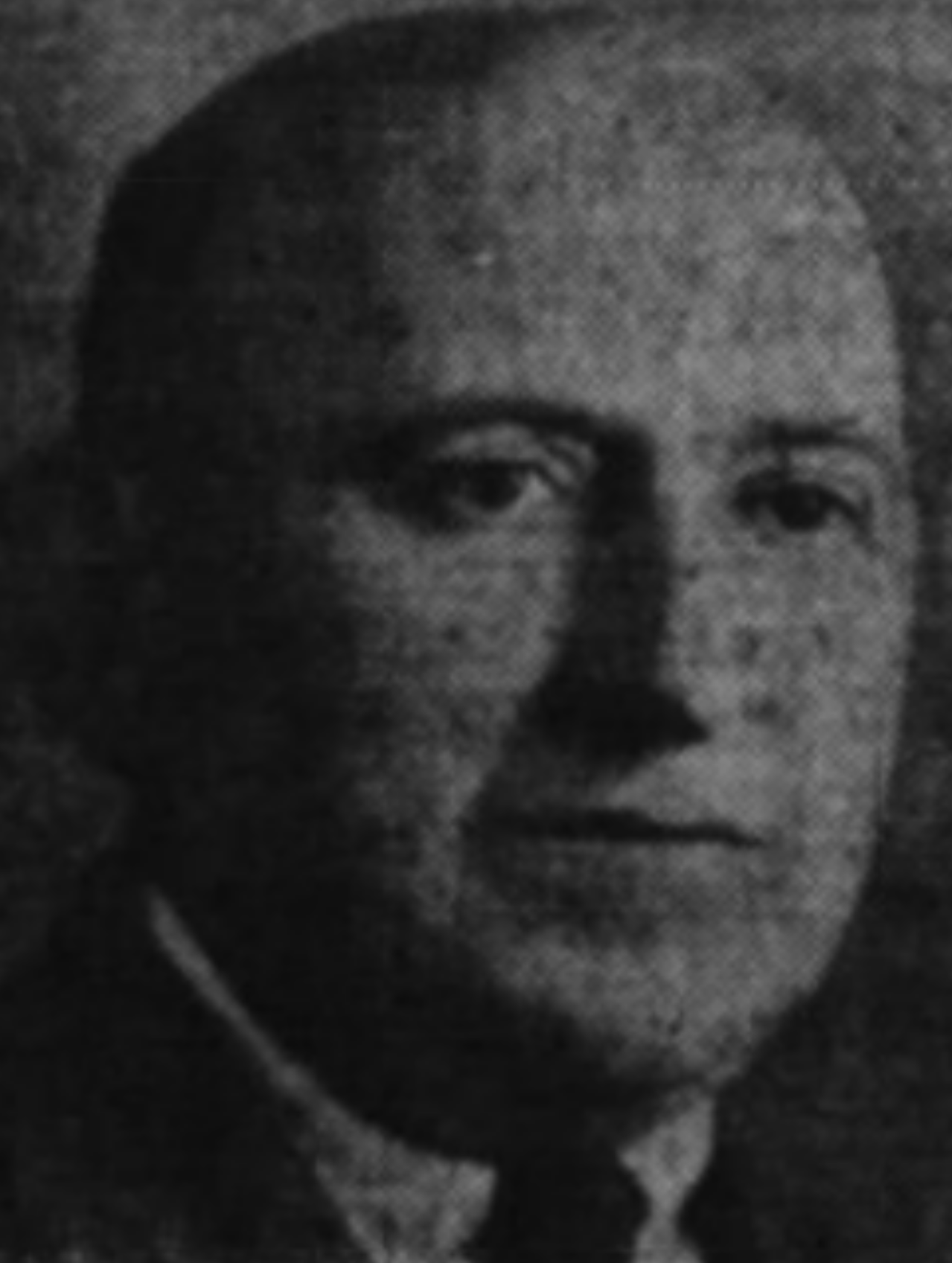
Nominee	Ralph Flanders	Charles McDevitt
Party	Republican	Democratic
Popular vote	54,729	18,594
Percentage	74.64%	25.36%
- Flanders: 50–60% 60–70% 70–80% 80–90% >90% McDevitt: 50–60% 60–70%
U.S. senator before election
Ralph Flanders
Republican
Elected U.S. Senator
Ralph Flanders
Republican

The 1946 United States Senate election in Vermont took place on November 5, 1946. Incumbent Republican Ralph Flanders successfully ran for re-election to a full term in the United States Senate, defeating Democratic candidate Charles P. McDevitt.

== Republican primary ==
=== Results ===
Republican primary results
Party	Candidate	Votes	%	±%
Republican	Ralph Flanders (inc.)	30,843	55.4	
Republican	Sterry R. Waterman	24,853	44.6	
Total votes		55,697	100	

== Democratic primary ==
=== Results ===
Democratic primary results
Party	Candidate	Votes	%	±%
Democratic	Charles P. McDevitt	2,494	98.7	
Democratic	Other	32	1.3	
Total votes		2,526	100	

== General election ==
=== Candidates ===
- Ralph Flanders (Republican), incumbent U.S. Senator
- Charles P. McDevitt, former chair of the Democratic Party of Vermont and former State Senator

=== Results ===
United States Senate election in Vermont, 1946
Party	Candidate	Votes	%	±%
Republican	Ralph Flanders (inc.)	54,729	74.64%	+8.19%
Democratic	Charles P. McDevitt	18,594	25.36%	−8.19%
Total votes		73,323	100.00%	
