= William Waterman =

William Waterman may refer to:

- William Waterman, see Thomas Churchyard
- William Waterman (MP), MP for Guildford
- William H. Waterman of the Waterman family

== See also ==
- William Waterman House, Rhode Island
