= 1952 United States Senate election in Vermont =

- November 4, 1952
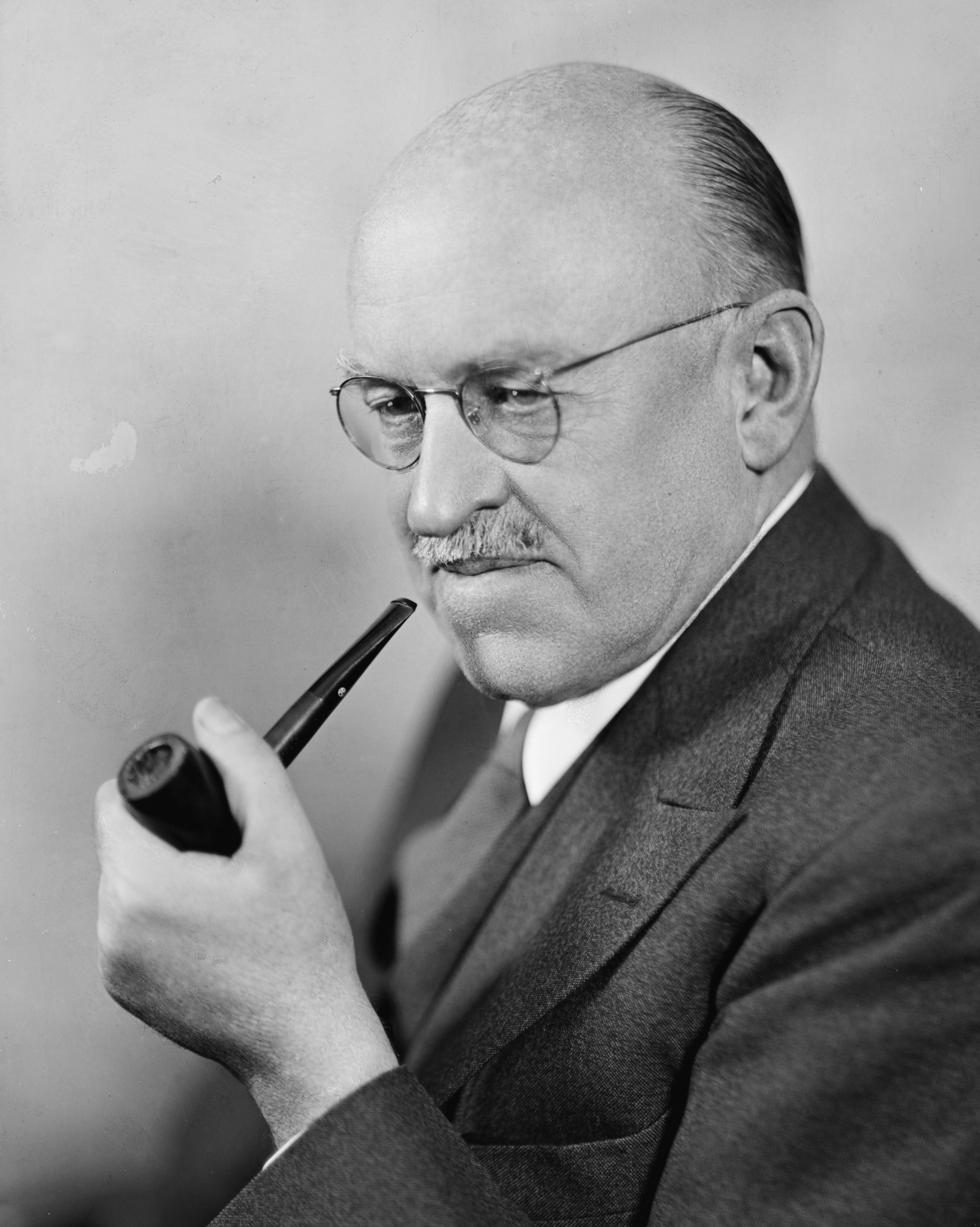

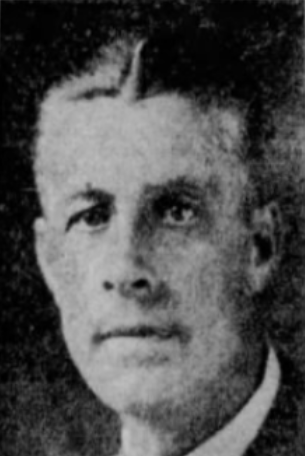
Nominee	Ralph Flanders	Allan Johnston
Party	Republican	Democratic
Popular vote	111,406	42,630
Percentage	72.32%	27.67%
U.S. senator before election
Ralph Flanders
Republican
Elected U.S. Senator
Ralph Flanders
Republican

The 1952 United States Senate election in Vermont took place on November 4, 1952. Incumbent Republican Ralph Flanders successfully ran for re-election to another term in the United States Senate, defeating Democratic candidate Allan R. Johnston.

== Republican primary ==
=== Results ===
Republican primary results
Party	Candidate	Votes	%	±%
Republican	Ralph Flanders (inc.)	58,860	87.2	
Republican	William Semeraro	8,627	12.8	
Republican	Other	11	0.0	
Total votes		67,498	100.0	

== Democratic primary ==
=== Results ===
Democratic primary results
Party	Candidate	Votes	%	±%
Democratic	Allan R. Johnston	5,460	99.7	
Democratic	Other	15	0.3	
Total votes		5,475	100.0	

== General election ==
=== Results ===
United States Senate election in Vermont, 1952
Party	Candidate	Votes	%
Republican	Ralph Flanders (Incumbent)	111,406	72.32%
Democratic	Allan R. Johnston	42,630	27.67%
N/A	Other	16	0.01%
Total votes		154,052	100.00%
