= Waterman Hémisphère =

Pen created by Waterman

The Waterman Hémisphère is a pen introduced in 1994 by the French pen company, Waterman.

The Hémisphère is a light pen that has a cigar shaped barrel with a beveled top and usual Waterman clip. It comes in many colours (metallic, blue, green, red, cognac), a lacquer finish, or a brushed chrome or gold finish. The clip comes in chrome or 24-karat gold finish.

In Japan, this model is known as the Waterman Metropolitan.

The pen is famous for being used by American horror writer, Stephen King, who has publicly stated that he handwrites his first drafts, using the Waterman Hemisphere.

== Images ==
Images of a Waterman Hémisphère

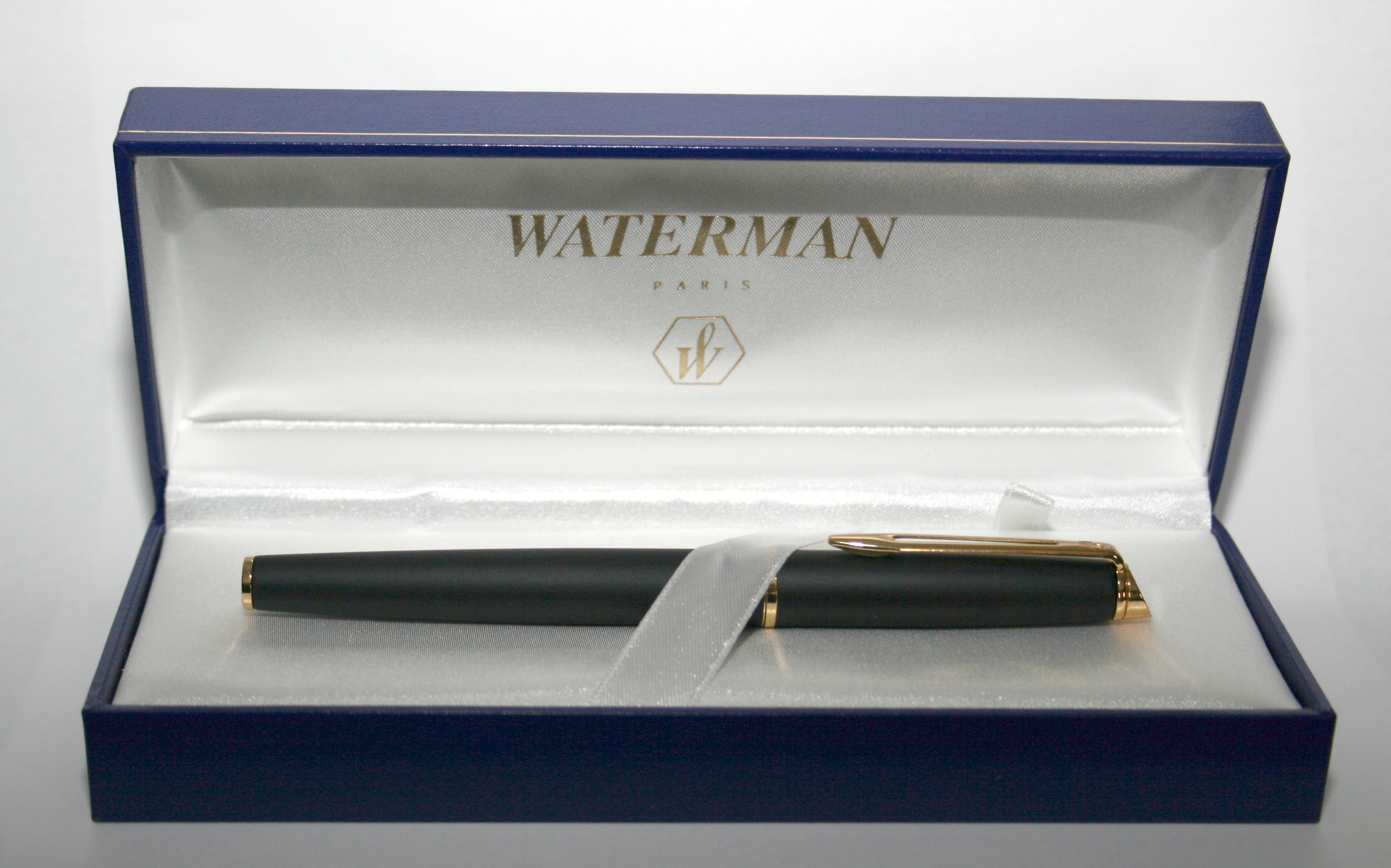
A Waterman Hemisphere in Matte Black with Gold Trim, shown here in its presentation case.

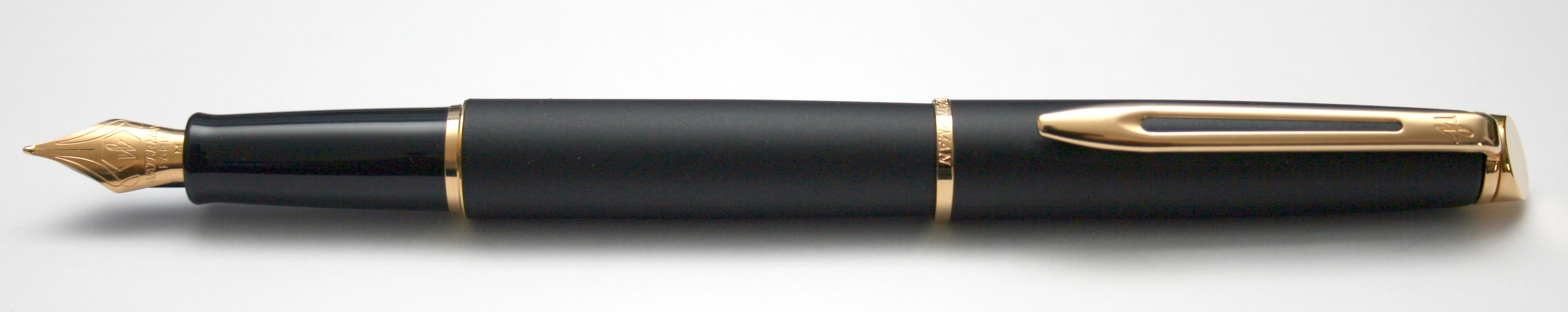
A Waterman Hemisphere in Matte Black with Gold Trim, shown here with the cap removed.

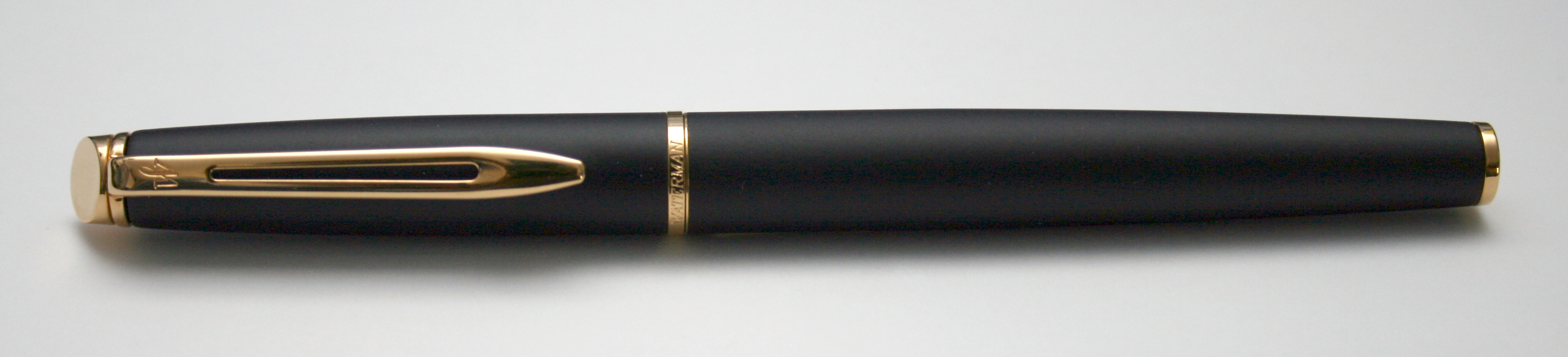
A Waterman Hemisphere in Matte Black with Gold Trim.
