= Watermans =

Watermans or Waterman's may refer to:

- Watermans Arts Centre, arts centre in London, England, UK
- Watermans Bay, Western Australia, suburb of Perth, Australia
- Waterman’s Museum, Yorktown, Virginia, USA

== See also ==
- Waterman (disambiguation)
- Waterman's knot
