= Waterman family =

American family of politicians

The Watermans are a family of politicians from the United States. Below is a list of members:

- David Waterman, Connecticut State Representative 1794 1800. Brother of Luther Waterman.
- Luther Waterman (1753–1807), New York Assemblyman 1804–1805. Brother of David Waterman.
  - Elisha Waterman (1777–1857), Connecticut State Representative 1824 1827, Connecticut State Senator 1837. Second cousin once removed of David Waterman and Luther Waterman.
  - Thomas G. Waterman (1787–1862), District Attorney of Broome County, New York 1822–1823; New York Assemblyman 1824; New York State Senator 1827–1830. Son of David Waterman.
    - William H. Waterman (1813–1867), Mayor of Racine, Wisconsin 1851. Second cousin twice removed of David Waterman and Luther Waterman.
    - Charles M. Waterman, Mayor of New Orleans, Louisiana 1856–1858. Third cousin twice removed of David Waterman and Luther Waterman.
      - Alexander H. Waterman (1825–1856), U.S. Consul in Curaçao 1856. Second cousin thrice removed of David Waterman and Luther Waterman.
      - Robert W. Waterman (1826–1891), Lieutenant Governor of California 1887, Governor of California 1887–1891. Second cousin thrice removed of David Waterman and Luther Waterman.
        - Sterry R. Waterman (1901–1984), delegate to the Republican National Convention 1936, Judge of the U.S. Court of Appeals 1955–1970. Second cousin four times removed of David Waterman and Luther Waterman.
        - Herbert Martin Waterman, Maine State Representative 1925–1926. Third cousin twice removed of Charles M. Waterman.
        - Jennifer Waterman (1923-1987) Family moves to Hammersmith, London
        - Henrietta II Waterman (1955-2010) married to Phillip Derham (1947-2013)

== See also ==
- List of United States political families
