= Justice Waterman =

Justice Waterman or Judge Waterman, may refer to:

- Charles M. Waterman (judge) (1847–1924), associate justice of the Iowa Supreme Court
- Sterry R. Waterman (1901–1984), American judge
- Thomas D. Waterman (born 1959), associate justice of the Iowa Supreme Court

== See also ==
- Waterman (disambiguation)
