= Waterman Building (Chicago) =

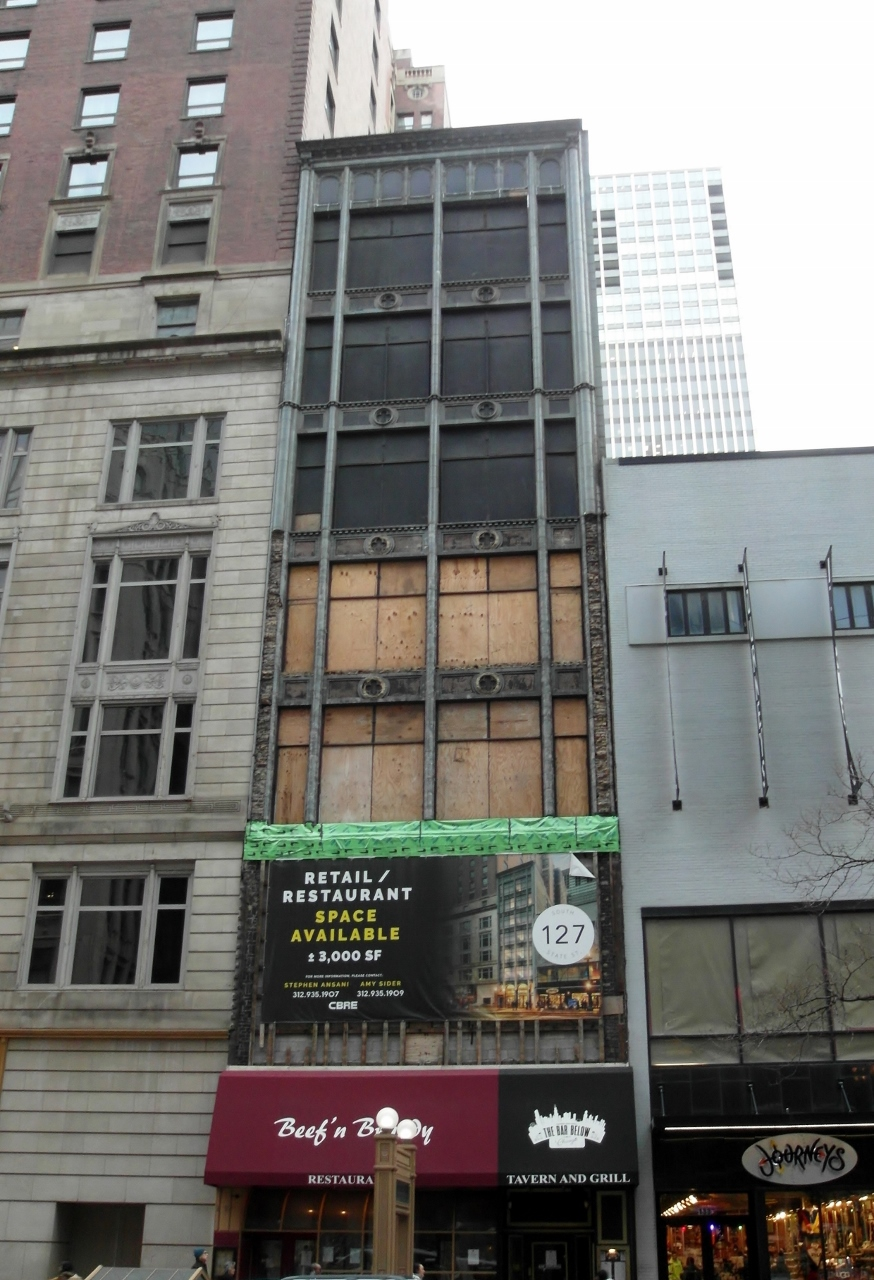
- Interactive map of the Waterman Building area

General information
- Location: 127 S. State Street, Chicago, Illinois
- Coordinates: 41°52′48.65″N 87°37′39.11″W
- Completed: 1920

Technical details
- Floor count: 7
- Floor area: 30,000 square feet (2,800 m^{2})

Design and construction
- Architect: Holabird and Roche

The Waterman Building is a historic building on State Street in Chicago's Loop. Designed by Holabird and Roche, construction began in 1919 was completed in 1920. The first floor originally housed the Waterman Pen Company's Chicago store, while Waterman's offices were located on upper floors.

== History ==
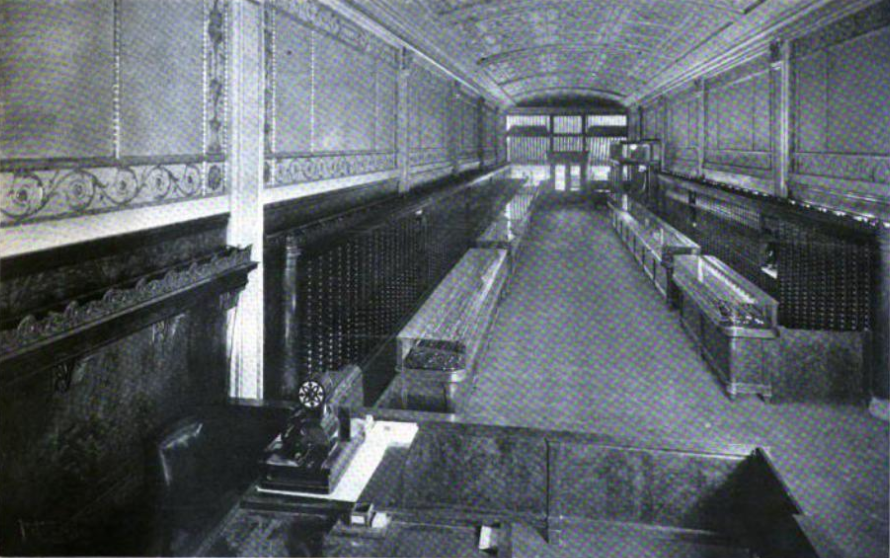
Sales room of the Waterman Building, 1920

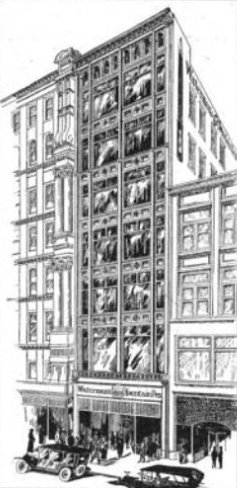
Illustration of the Waterman Building, 1920

In 1918, the Waterman Pen Company began leasing the property and initially announced plans to renovate the existing building and replace its facade, at an estimated cost of $100,000. However, Waterman instead built an entirely new building, at a cost of $225,000. Designed by Holabird and Roche, it was the first new building to be built in Chicago's Loop following the start of World War I. The exterior was clad in blue terra cotta and encaustic mosaic panels, while the interior featured black walnut furnishing and fixtures, a vaulted ceiling decorated in silver and gray, and cork tile flooring. Waterman moved into the building on May 10, 1920.

In 1922, the Chicago Business College began leasing the sixth floor of the building. In 1923, the White Star Line began leasing the building's second floor for $10,000 a year. On October 20, 1938, Three Sisters, a woman's apparel shop, opened its fifth Chicago-area store in the Waterman Building. On February 21, 1952, Mary Jane Shoes opened its store in the building.

In the 1960s, the building was home to Stanley Green's, a kosher cafeteria and buffet. The cafeteria was located on the ground floor, while the lower floor featured the dining room and cocktail lounge. From 1967 to 2018, the restaurant Beef and Brandy was located on the ground floor, while its bar, the Bar Below, was located on the lower floor. In 2018, the building was sold and Sonder Corp. intended to renovate it and open a 41 room hotel in the top four stories, with retail on the first two floors. However, this plan did not come to fruition, and the building has been again listed for sale.
