= Lewis Waterman =

American inventor (1836-1901)

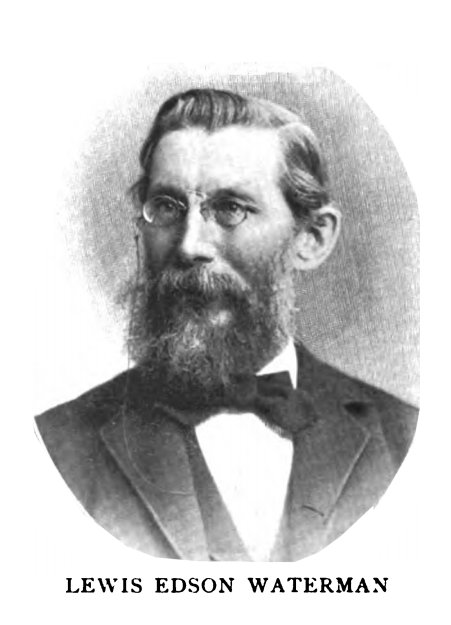
- Born: Lewis Edson Waterman; 20 November 1836; Decatur, New York, U.S.
- Died: 1 May 1901 (aged 64); New York City, U.S.
- Burial place: Forest Hills Cemetery
- Occupation: Inventor

Lewis Edson Waterman (November 20, 1836 – May 1, 1901) was an American inventor. He held multiple fountain pen patents and was the founder of the Waterman Pen Company.

His entry into fountain pen manufacturing has only recently been properly researched. Waterman was working as a pen salesman in New York for a new company founded in the spring of 1883 by a volatile inventor named Frank Holland. Holland abandoned his company after only six weeks; Waterman stepped in and took over, fitting the pens with a simplified feed of his own design. It was for this "three fissure feed" which his first pen-related patent was granted in 1884.

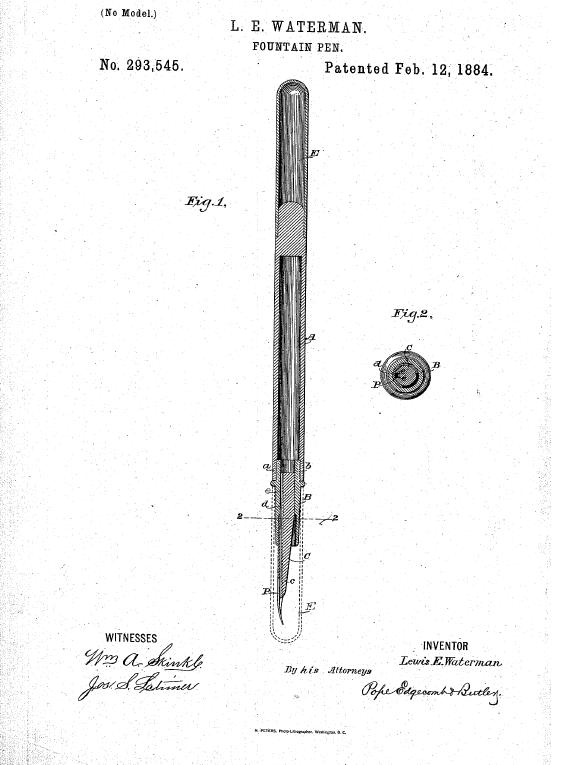
Waterman's fountain pen, patented February 12, 1884

Waterman was inducted into the National Inventors Hall of Fame in 2006.

== Early life ==
Waterman was born in Decatur, New York on November 20, 1836. His father was a wagon maker who died when Lewis was three. The boy grew up on his stepfather's farm, attending the district school until he was fifteen, then attending the seminary at Charlotteville, New York for some three months. Still fifteen, he began teaching, supplementing his income by carpentry work. Waterman chiefly taught Pitman shorthand ("stenography"), which took him to Illinois and Virginia.

== Other career paths ==
Waterman began selling insurance in 1862, starting in Michigan but relocating to Boston in 1864. In the late 1860s Waterman and his wife Sara Ann Roberts were converted to Spiritualism; his wife gained some fame (and income) as a medium, only to be unmasked and publicly pilloried as a charlatan. In the wake of this and the death of an infant daughter in the summer of 1870, Waterman left his wife and remaining children and moved to New York. In New York, Waterman attended lectures at the American Institute of Phrenology, from which he graduated that same year. Waterman remained keen on phrenology until the end of his life. By 1871 he was promoting the "Reactionary Lifter", a form of weight training machine. Waterman remarried in 1872, and was back in the insurance business in Boston from 1875 to 1877. A few years later he was on the move again, working as editor for railroad journals The Railroad Gazette and National Car Builder. It appears that it was during this period that Waterman began to sell fountain pens, not of his manufacture. Near the end of his life, Waterman started the Waterman Condensing Company to make fruit extracts, but this venture lasted only a few years.

Waterman died in Brooklyn on May 1, 1901, and was buried in Forest Hills Cemetery, Jamaica Plain, MA. Following his death, his nephew Frank D. Waterman took the business overseas and increased sales to 350,000 pens per year.

== The ink blot myth ==
There has been a great deal of mythologizing of Waterman's life and career. The tale that he was prompted to invent a better fountain pen upon losing an insurance sale after the contract was spoiled by an ink blot left by a balky fountain pen has been widely repeated, but is completely unfounded.
