= Waterman Pen Company =

Writing instrument manufacturer in France

Waterman S.A.
- Company type: Subsidiary
- Industry: Writing instruments
- Founded: 1884; 142 years ago in New York, U.S.
- Founder: Lewis Waterman
- Headquarters: Paris, France
- Area served: Worldwide
- Products: Fountain pens, inks
- Owner: Newell Brands
- Parent: Sanford L.P.
- Website: waterman.com

The Waterman Pen Company is a major French manufacturing company of luxury fountain pens and inks, based in Paris, France. The firm was established in 1884 in New York City by Lewis Waterman, being one of the few remaining first-generation fountain pen companies, as "Waterman S.A."

Since 2000 Waterman has been owned by the American group Newell Brands, through its subsidiary, Sanford L.P.

== History ==
Lewis Waterman, an insurance salesman in New York City, invented the first truly functional fountain pen in the early 1880s. An apocryphal story is that a typical pen of the day leaked all over a contract he had prepared for a large policy, and by the time Waterman returned with a new document, his client had signed with someone else. Later, Waterman was working as a pen salesman in New York for a new company founded in the spring of 1883 by a volatile inventor named Frank Holland. Holland abandoned his company after only six weeks; Waterman stepped in and took over, fitting the pens with a simplified feed of his own design. It was for this "three fissure feed" that his first pen-related patent was granted in 1884.

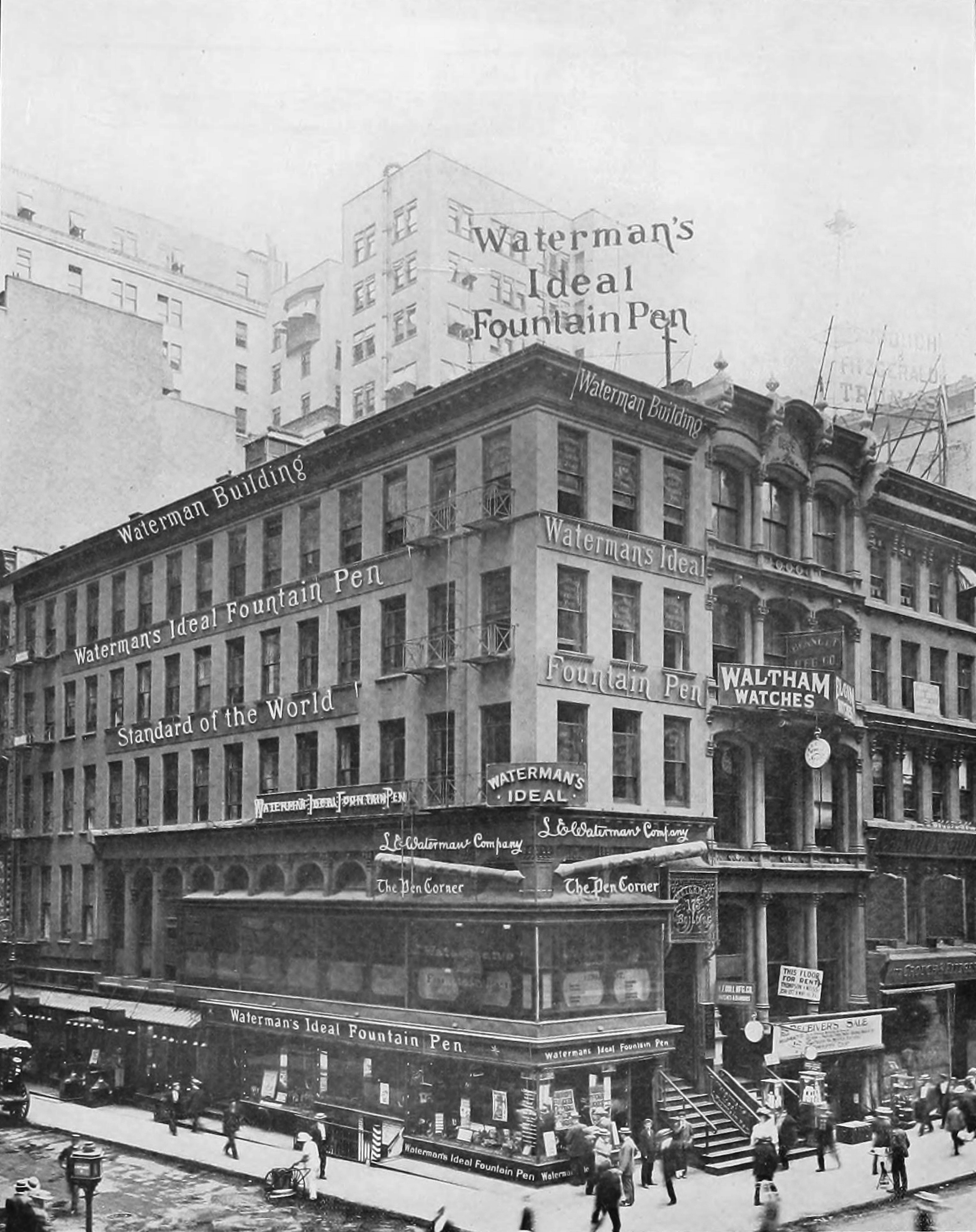
Waterman Building in Manhattan, c. 1906

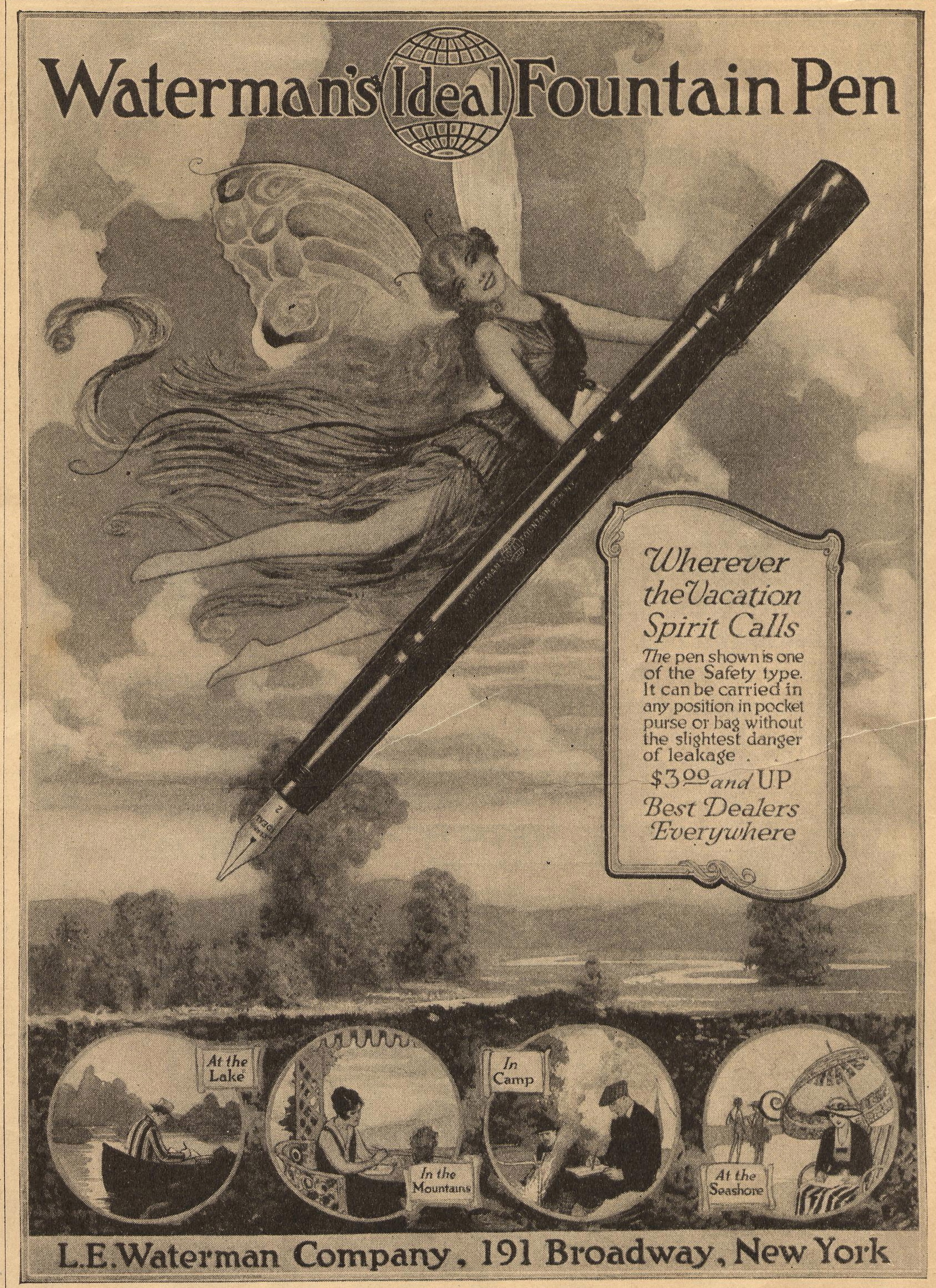
Illustrated advertisement in Life Magazine, 1919

From the beginning, competition in the fountain pen industry was fierce, both in the marketplace and the courtroom. Despite later company literature that depicts Lewis E. Waterman as a golden-hearted innocent, all evidence indicates that he was a tough, savvy, and innovative businessman. In 1899 the L.E. Waterman Company developed the "spoon Feed" system which prevented the overflow of ink, which also led to the company receiving the gold medal of excellence at the "Exposition Universelle" in Paris in 1900.

Nonetheless, it was after L.E. Waterman's death in 1901 that the company took off. Under the leadership of Waterman's nephew, Frank D. Waterman, the Waterman Pen Company expanded aggressively worldwide. While Waterman introduced its share of innovations, the company's main selling point was always quality and reliability.

In 1905 Waterman patented their first permanently attached pen clip, allowing a pen to be held directly in a pocket. In 1908 Waterman released their first retractable nib "safety" pen.

As the 20th century wore on, Waterman's conservatism allowed its younger and more innovative competitors to gain market share—Parker, Sheaffer, and Wahl-Eversharp in particular. By the later 1920s, Waterman was attempting to catch up; it continued to struggle through and beyond World War II before finally shutting down in 1954.

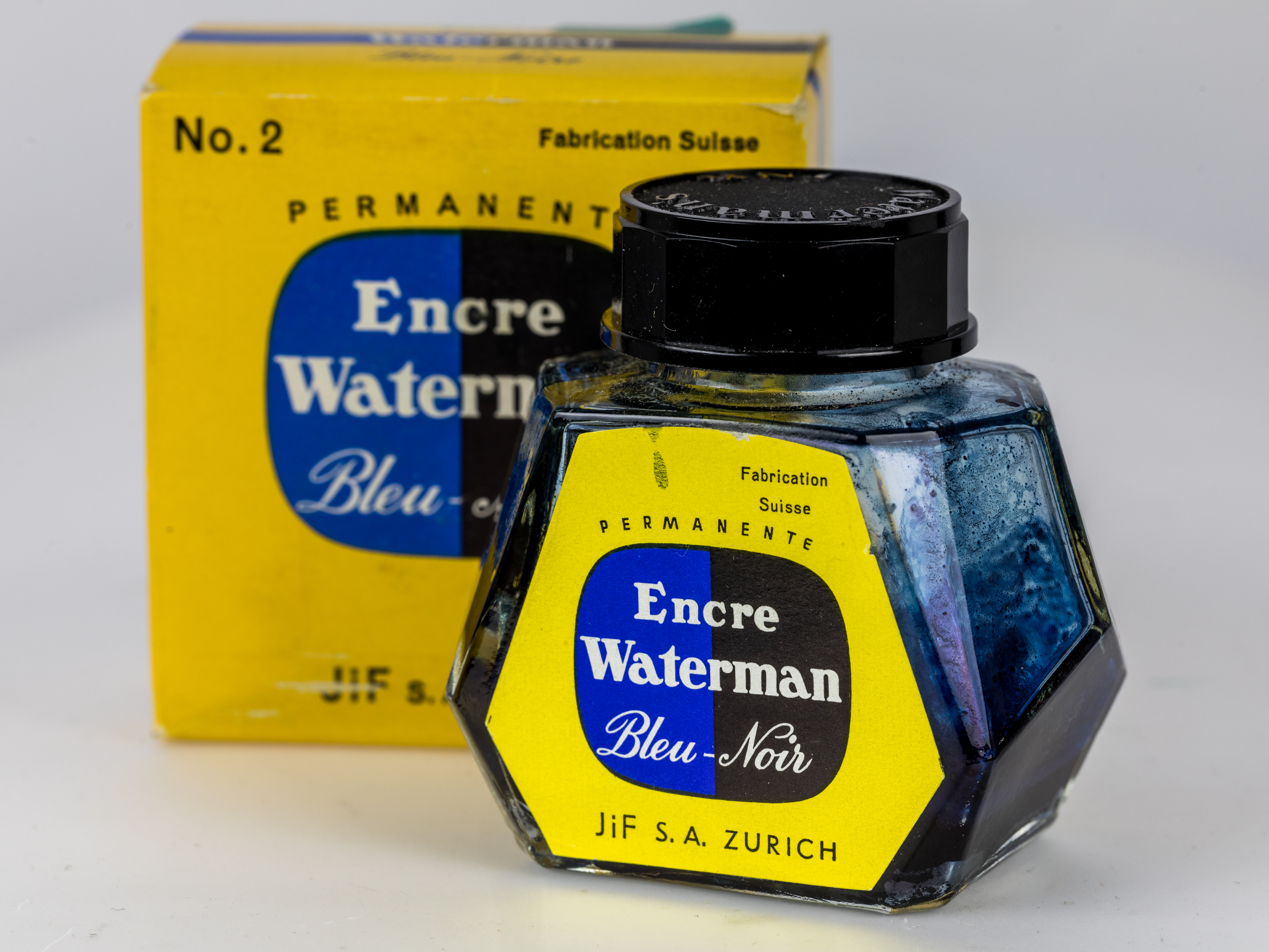
Waterman ink "Bleu-Noire", made in Switzerland by JiF S.A., Zurich, 1977

Waterman's French subsidiary, Waterman-JiF (Jules-Isidore Fagard) later Waterman S.A., continued to prosper and eventually absorbed what remained of the American company and its British arm.

The Waterman company was acquired by the Bic company which went public in 1958 with a reverse merger; Bic would later sell off the Waterman division.

Successfully weathering the challenge of the ballpoint pen, it was acquired by The Gillette Company in March 1987 which grew overall sales by 40% with its aggressive North American sales and later sold to Sanford, a division of Newell Rubbermaid (now known as Newell Brands), along with the Parker Pen Division, which Gillette acquired in 1993.

== Pens ==
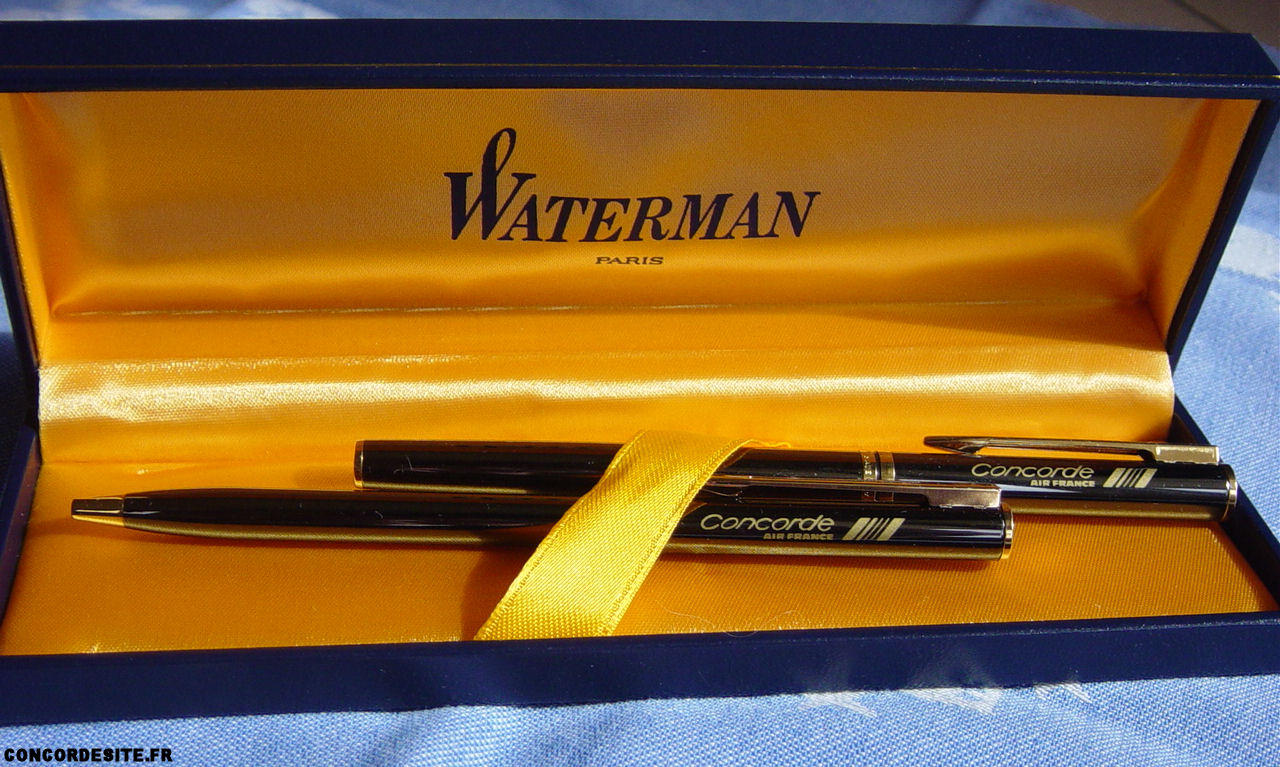
Waterman pens made for Air France's Concorde

Early Waterman pens were made of hard rubber and were equipped with 14K gold nibs. From early on, precious metal trim and overlays were offered. Many are still in use today, and their nibs are prized for their smoothness and flexibility.

Waterman's high production volume from c. 1900 on means that vintage examples are comparatively easy to find today. The most common models from the hard rubber era are the #12 slip-cap eyedropper, the #52 screw-cap lever-filler, and the #42 retracting-nib safety pen. Though largely ignored by present-day collectors, the Waterman C/F of 1953 introduced the modern plastic ink cartridge.

In 1983 and celebrating the company's 100th anniversary, Waterman created the Le Man 100, aiming its products at the luxury writing market. Former French President François Mitterrand was known for carrying two wherever he went.

As Waterman progressed into the modern era, it produced many of the pens that are still available today including the Edson, the Exception, the Philéas, the Hémisphère, the Expert, the Harmonie, the Charleston, the Ici et Là, the Audace, the Sérénité, the Liaison, and the Carène.

== See also ==
- Waterman Hémisphère
- Waterman Philéas
- Waterman Building (Chicago)
- Marcel Bich
