= L. D. Warren =

American cartoonist

L.D. Warren at his drawing board ca. 1974. Photograph by Julianne Warren.

Leonard Deakyn "L.D." Warren (December 27, 1906 Wilmington, Delaware - May 14, 1992) was an American editorial cartoonist. Warren graduated from Camden High School in Camden, New Jersey, where his family eventually moved.

== Career ==
Warren worked at the New Jersey Courier Post, before joining the Philadelphia Record in 1927. At the Record, Warren drew feature, editorial and sports cartoons. In the 1930s, he also worked on a comic strip featuring Penny Penguin, a character for the Gulf Oil Corporation and contributed to Gulf Funny Weekly.

After twenty years with the Philadelphia Record, Warren moved to the Cincinnati Enquirer in 1947. While working as the Enquirer's editorial cartoonist, Warren's work was also syndicated through the McNaught Syndicate (1951–1974).

In 1973, Warren officially retired from the Cincinnati Enquirer, but continued to draw a weekly cartoon to the newspaper. He was also able to recommend his replacement, cartoonist Jim Borgman.

His work was shown at Ohio State University.

== Awards ==
Cartoon by L. D. Warren.

Warren received numerous awards from the Freedoms Foundation. He also won the National Headliner award in 1961. He was also nominated for the National Cartoonists Society Reuben award three times during his career. He received the American Legion 4th Estate award for his patriotic themes in 1974.

== Books ==
The World and Warren's Cartoons was published in 1977.
