= Waterman Philéas =

Series of writing instruments

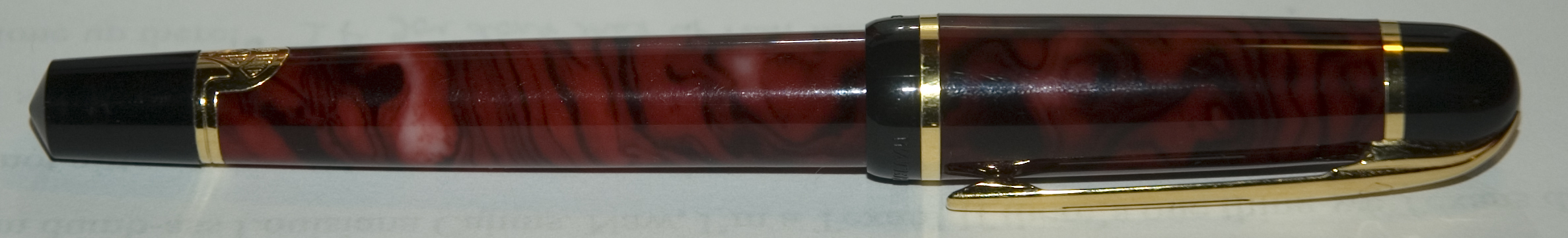
Waterman Philéas fountain pen

Waterman Philéas is a series of writing instruments including fountain pens, rollerballs, ballpoints and pencils produced by the Waterman pen company. It is well-known because of its good price-quality ratio and is therefore often recommended for novice fountain pen users and collectors. This series is now discontinued.

The Waterman company named this line of writing instruments after the character Phileas Fogg in Around the World in Eighty Days by the French novelist Jules Verne. The design reflects an Art Deco look of the 1930s. However, neither the Art Deco movement nor the modern fountain pen existed when Verne penned Eighty Days.

The fountain pens have a wide, two toned gold-plated and steel nib that fans out at the base and tapers to a fine point, decorated with an Art Deco styled engraving. The gold plated pen-clip carries the Waterman hexagon seal and flows from the top of the cap. The ebony black crown contrasts with the gold-plated ring around the barrel which resembles an engraved cigar band. There are three other bands on the barrel and cap as vestiges of traditional fountain pen design, which used these rings to limit cracking.

In addition to the Philéas, Waterman produced the Kultur pen, which is a less expensive version whose fountain pens have plain steel nibs and is minus a weight-adding brass insert common to the Philéas, but otherwise carry the same design as the Philéas. The Kultur is available in a number of transparent demonstrator colors.

The fountain pens are supplied with a convertible system for filling with either bottled ink or an ink cartridge. They are manufactured in several different colors and nib widths.
