= Robert Waterman =

Robert Waterman may refer to:

- Robert Waterman (bishop) (1894–1984), Anglican bishop in Canada
- Robert Waterman (governor) (1826–1891), governor of California
- Robert Waterman (sea captain) (1808–1884), clipper ship captain
- Robert H. Waterman Jr., author and expert on management practices
