= Steve Waterman =

Steve Waterman may refer to:

- Steve Waterman (producer), film and television producer
- Steve Waterman (musician) (born 1960), British jazz trumpeter, composer and educator
- Steve Waterman (mathematician), inventor of Waterman polyhedra and the Waterman butterfly projection
