= Charles Waterman (disambiguation) =

Charles Waterman (1861–1932) was a Colorado attorney and politician.

Charles Waterman may also refer to:

- Charles M. Waterman (judge), Justice of the Iowa Supreme Court
- Charles M. Waterman (politician), 17th mayor of New Orleans
