= Thomas Waterman =

Thomas Waterman may refer to:

- Thomas G. Waterman (1788–1862), American lawyer and politician from New York
- Thomas D. Waterman (born 1959), justice on the Iowa Supreme Court
- Thomas Waterman (MP), Member of Parliament (MP) for Yorkshire

== See also ==
- Thomas Waterman Wood (1823–1903), American painter
