= Dennis Waterman (disambiguation) =

Dennis Waterman (1948–2022) was a British actor.

Dennis Waterman may also refer to:

- Dennis Waterman (Little Britain), a caricature of Waterman
- Dennis Waterman (poker player) (1948–2022), American poker player and author
