= Andrew Waterman =

Andrew Waterman may refer to:

- Andrew Waterman (poet) (born 1940), British poet
- Andrew J. Waterman (1825–1900), lawyer and Attorney General of Massachusetts
- Andrew Kenneth Waterman (1913–1941), US Navy sailor
