= Senator Waterman (disambiguation) =

Charles W. Waterman (1861–1932) was a U.S. Senator from Colorado from 1927 to 1932. Senator Waterman may also refer to:

- Eleazer L. Waterman (1839–1929), Vermont State Senate
- Harrison Lyman Waterman (1840–1918), Iowa State Senate
- John Waterman (born 1952), Indiana State Senate
- Thomas G. Waterman (1788–1862), New York State Senate
