= Sterry R. Waterman =

American judge (1901–1984)

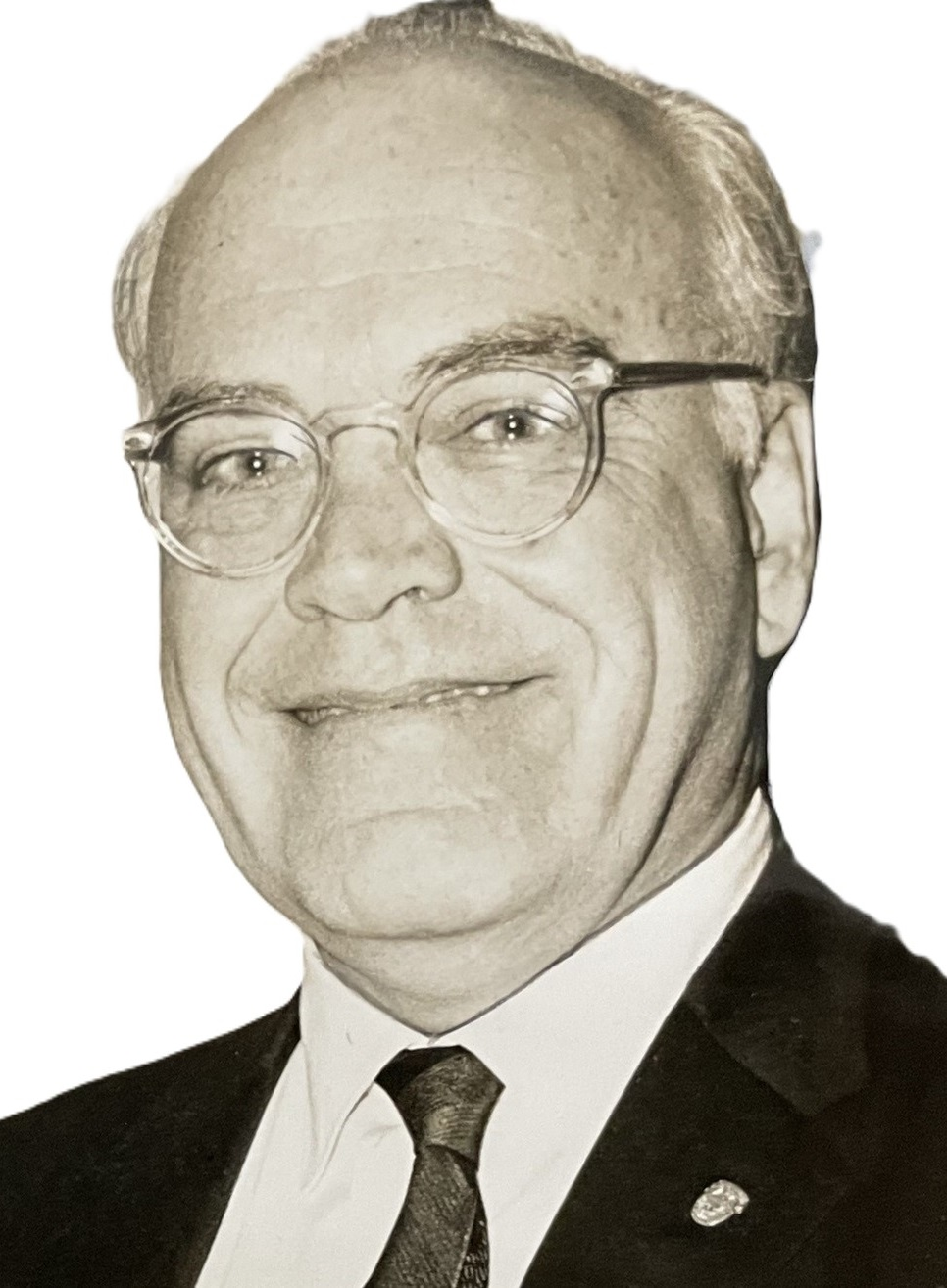
- Waterman in 1963. Cropped from original.

Senior Judge of the United States Court of Appeals for the Second Circuit
- In office November 13, 1970 – February 6, 1984

Judge of the United States Court of Appeals for the Second Circuit
- In office July 13, 1955 – November 13, 1970
- Appointed by: Dwight D. Eisenhower
- Preceded by: Harrie B. Chase
- Succeeded by: James L. Oakes

President of the Vermont Law School Board of Trustees
- In office 1974–1983
- Preceded by: Thomas M. Debevoise
- Succeeded by: Hilton Wick

President of the American Judicature Society
- In office 1962–1964
- Preceded by: Cecil E. Burney
- Succeeded by: Henry L. Woolfenden

President of the Vermont Bar Association
- In office 1957–1958
- Preceded by: Henry F. Black
- Succeeded by: Clifton G. Parker

State's Attorney of Caledonia County, Vermont
- In office 1933–1937
- Preceded by: Oscar L. Shepard
- Succeeded by: H. Stanwood Brooks

Personal details
- Born: Sterry Robinson Waterman; June 12, 1901 Taunton, Massachusetts, U.S.
- Died: February 6, 1984 (aged 82) St. Johnsbury, Vermont, U.S.
- Resting place: Mount Pleasant Cemetery; St. Johnsbury, Vermont
- Party: Republican
- Spouse: Frances Knight (m. 1932-1975, her death)
- Children: 2
- Education: Dartmouth College (AB); Harvard Law School; George Washington University Law School; Vermont Law School (JD)
- Occupation: Attorney

Sterry Robinson Waterman (June 12, 1901 – February 6, 1984) was a Vermont lawyer and a United States circuit judge of the United States Court of Appeals for the Second Circuit.

== Early life ==
Waterman was born in Taunton, Massachusetts on June 12, 1901, the son of Zeno Sterry Waterman and Sarah (Robinson) Waterman. He graduated from St. Johnsbury Academy and received his Bachelor of Arts degree from Dartmouth College in 1922. He attended Harvard Law School and then moved to Washington, D.C. to accept a position with the federal Commissioner of Immigration while continuing his studies at George Washington University Law School. He read law and passed the bar exam in 1926 needing to complete one course before graduating. He then ended his studies and began to practice, first in Washington, D.C. and later in St. Johnsbury, Vermont, from 1926 to 1955.

== Legal career ==
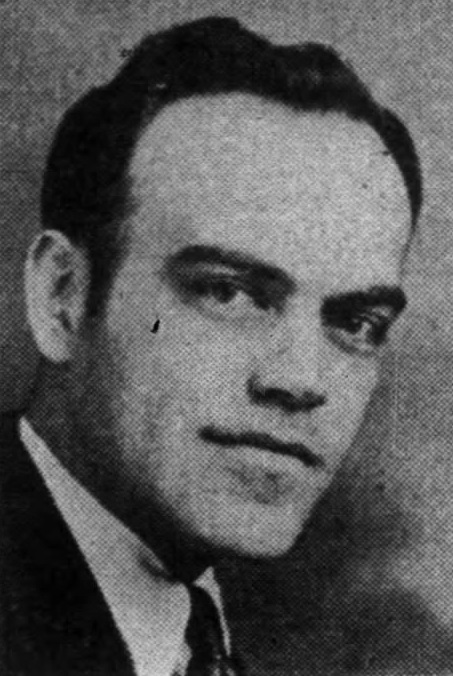
Waterman in 1933 as Assistant Secretary of the Vermont Senate

Active in Republican politics, he was State's Attorney for Caledonia County, Vermont from 1933 to 1937 and Assistant Secretary of the Vermont Senate from 1933 to 1940. He served as general counsel of the Vermont Unemployment Compensation Commission for four years, a delegate to the 1936 Republican National Convention, a member of the commission to investigate the Vermont Court System from 1935 to 1937, and a member of the Vermont Uniform State Laws Commission from 1938 to 1958.

In the 1930s and 1940s Waterman was a founder and leader of the Vermont Young Republicans, and was recognized as a leader of the progressive wing of Vermont's Republican party, which included George Aiken and Ernest W. Gibson Jr. (Gibson and Waterman had attended law school together, and Gibson was Secretary of the Vermont Senate when Waterman was Assistant Secretary.) Waterman managed Aiken's successful 1936 campaign for governor, and in 1946 was an unsuccessful candidate for the United States Senate, losing the Republican primary to Ralph E. Flanders, who went on to win the general election. As a member of the Uniform State Laws Commission during the 1940s and early 1950s, Waterman was an author and promoter of the Uniform Commercial Code, which was adopted in 1952. From 1957 to 1958, Waterman served as president of the Vermont Bar Association. He was president of the American Judicature Society from 1962 to 1964.

== Federal judicial service ==
Waterman was nominated by President Dwight D. Eisenhower on May 13, 1955, to a seat on the United States Court of Appeals for the Second Circuit vacated by Judge Harrie B. Chase. Vermont's Senators, Aiken and Flanders, had initially been willing to recommend Gibson, but Gibson preferred to remain on the United States District Court for the District of Vermont so that he would not have to leave Vermont. They then recommended Waterman, who was opposed by conservative Republicans, which caused Eisenhower to request that they submit another recommendation. Aiken and Flanders persisted until Waterman was confirmed. He was confirmed by the United States Senate on July 11, 1955, and received his commission on July 13, 1955. He assumed senior status on November 13, 1970, and took inactive senior status in 1983. His service was terminated on February 6, 1984, due to his death. Among the law clerks Waterman employed during his judicial career was William B. Gray, who later served as United States Attorney for Vermont.

=== Notable cases ===
Once confirmed, Waterman authored or assisted in authoring more than 600 judicial opinions. Waterman's opinions included the one that upheld the prosecution and sentencing of Soviet spy Rudolf Abel. He also wrote the opinion that reaffirmed the order for a special New York legislative election in 1965, which the state Court of Appeals had canceled.

== Other activities ==
Waterman was a longtime trustee of both St. Johnsbury Academy and served as president of the board. Despite the fact that he had spoken against the creation of Vermont Law School, he served as a trustee after the school was founded, and also served as president of the board.

=== Belated law school completion ===
Waterman received his Juris Doctor from Vermont Law School school in 1977. The degree was conferred after the trustees, faculty and administration agreed that his writings while serving as a judge satisfied the requirements for the course he had not completed before passing the bar exam in 1926.

== Death and burial ==
Waterman died in St. Johnsbury on February 6, 1984, aged 82, and was buried at Mount Pleasant Cemetery in St. Johnsbury.

== Awards and honors ==
Waterman received several honorary degrees, including: Dartmouth College (LL.D., 1963); Harvard Law School (LL.D., 1969); George Washington University Law School (LL.D., 1969); University of Vermont (LL.D., 1972); and New York University School of Law (LL.D., 1979). His personal and official papers are archived at the University of Vermont. Vermont Law School maintains a scholarship and lecture series in Waterman's name, and the school's Waterman Hall is named for him.

== Family ==
In 1932, Waterman married Frances Knight (1906–1975). They were the parents of two sons, Robert and Thomas.

Legal offices
Preceded by Harrie B. Chase	Judge of the United States Court of Appeals for the Second Circuit; 1955–1970	Succeeded by James L. Oakes
